= Gamera =

Fictional monster, or kaiju

- Gamera film series character
- Gamera, as portrayed in Gamera, the Giant Monster (1965)
- First appearance: Gamera, the Giant Monster (1965)
- Created by: Noriaki Yuasa; Niisan Takahashi; Masaichi Nagata; Hidemasa Nagata; Yonejiro Saito; Yonesaburo Tsukiji; Akira Inoue; Masao Yagi; Tomio Sagisu
- Portrayed by: Teruo Aragaki; Umenosuke Izumi; Naoaki Manabe; Jun Suzuki; Akira Ohashi; Hirofumi Fukuzawa; Toshinori Sasaki

In-universe information
- Aliases: Avant Gamera; Toto; Black Tortoise
- Species: Giant turtle-like creature; Artificial lifeform; Deity

Gamera (Japanese: ガメラ, Hepburn: Gamera) is a giant monster, or kaiju, (Note: The term "daikaiju" (Japanese: 大怪獣, Hepburn: daikaijū), which signifies "great kaiju", has been sporadically used for the Japanese titles of the franchise's productions ever since the first film Gamera, the Giant Monster (1965), and the character has been viewed as one.) that debuted in the 1965 film Gamera, the Giant Monster by Daiei Film. The character and the first film were intended to follow the success of Toho's Godzilla film series, while various staffs have participated in both and related franchises, and the two franchises have influenced each other. The Daiei franchise has become a Japanese icon in its own right and one of the many representatives of Japanese cinema, appearing in a total of 12 films produced by Daiei Film and later by Tokuma Shoten and Kadokawa Daiei Studio (Kadokawa Corporation) respectively, and various other mediums such as novels, anime, videos, manga and cartoons, magazines, video games, television programs, shows, other merchandises, and so on.

Gamera is depicted as a giant, flying, fire-breathing, prehistoric turtle. In the series' first film, Gamera is portrayed as an aggressive and destructive monster, though he also saved a child's life. As the films progressed, Gamera took on a more benevolent role, becoming a protector of humanity, especially children, nature, and the Earth from extraterrestrial races and other giant monsters.

The Gamera franchise has been (both directly and indirectly) very influential in Japan and internationally. This is seen notably in the productions of the Daimajin and Yokai Monsters film franchises and influences on the entire tokusatsu genre, including the Godzilla franchise, and the domestic television industry. The franchise directly and indirectly contributed in starting of two influential social phenomena (the two "Kaiju Booms" (jp)(jp) and their successor "Yōkai / Kaiki Boom"), and Gamera and Daimajin franchises were part of the "Kaiju Booms". Gamera and Daimajin and other related characters have been referenced and used in various topics, such as the naming of prehistoric turtles (Sinemys gamera (jp) and Gamerabaena), an algorithm to study plasma bubbles, and many others. 27 November is publicly referred to as the "Gamera Day" (Japanese: ガメラの日, Hepburn: Gamera no Hi) in Japan, and Gamera and related characters are used as mascots by the city of Chōfu.

Despite its popularity and influence, expansion of the franchise and public recognition of the character were severely hindered by Daiei Film and its successors' (Tokuma Shoten (Note: Tokuma Shoten's debt reached ¥130 billion in 2001 due to the bursting of the Japanese asset price bubble, and the death of the founder Yasuyoshi Tokuma (also the executive producer of the Heisei trilogy) in 2000 resulted in disposals of business rights of various properties afterward including Daiei Film (2002) and Studio Ghibli to rehabilitate the company.) (Note: Tokuma Shoten couldn't afford entire budgets for the Heisei trilogy since the beginning (despite being considerably cheaper than Godzilla films at that time), where the company originally presented ¥500 million for the 1995 film, however Shusuke Kaneko strongly demanded to rise it to at least ¥600 million, therefore Nippon TV and Hakuhodo co-funded the production and revenues for Tokuma Shoten was further restricted due to this treaty.) and Kadokawa Corporation) precarious financial conditions and distribution weaknesses, facing repeated copyright transfers of Daiei properties, failed global expansions despite featuring foreign casts, diminished media attentions, and cancellations of various projects escalated by controversial aspects of the highly acclaimed Heisei trilogy, and the competition against the Godzilla franchise. On the other hand, both franchises bear connections in productions and distributions, and there have been failed attempts to produce a direct crossover.

Despite being a major film studio and Masaichi Nagata being a highly influential figure, (Note: Nagata was entitled as the "Father of the cinema" due to his contributions and achievements for the domestic film industry, including the releases and distributions of King Kong and The Beast from 20,000 Fathoms, and his efforts to save the declining industry contributed in the prosperity of kaiju and tokusatsu genres and their exporting to the global markets.) Daiei Film was already at the brink of bankruptcy due to multiple factors, including the decline of the film industry itself (even including Toho and its Godzilla franchise) from the competition against the rising television industry, which was boosted by the 1964 Summer Olympics, a recession, and the aforementioned "Kaiju Booms" most notably Ultra Q and Ultraman where Nagata's attempt to save the film industry resulted in the governmental supports for productions and exports of kaiju and tokusatsu genres, and the booms were ironically shaped. Consequently, both The Whale God (1962), Daiei's first kaiju film, and Gamera, the Giant Monster (1965) became black-and-white despite having Warning from Space (1956), the first colored tokusatsu film in Japan.

Daiei Film's situation improved thanks to the Gamera franchise, (Note: For example, Daiei's entire annual (1996) box office revenue was doubled due to the success of the double featuring of Gamera vs. Barugon and Daimajin. Daimajin and Yokai Monsters franchises were launched due to the success of Gamera. Wages for a number of workers from Daiei and its subcontractors were unpaid back then, forcing them to struggle to manage living expenses including tuition fees for their children. Payments to them were restarted after the success of the Gamera franchise.) which solely supported the company and its subcontractors until Daiei's bankruptcy in December 1971, about four months after the theatrical release of Gamera vs. Zigra. On the other hand, not only budgets, schedules, ideas, (Note: Budgetary and schedule constraints, inadequate equipment, and labor shortages resulted in limitations on designs and abilities of kaiju and items and options for settings and locations, cancellations of a new monster, decreased kaiju battles and city destructions, qualities of plots, and so on. Sequels after the second film Gamera vs. Barugon suffered continuously declining budgets, with an exception of Gamera vs. Jiger.) and (both physical and human) resources, but also labor conditions continuously declined and impoverished remaining employees, (Note: Salaries for employees, which were resumed thanks to the Gamera series, again became unstable where even Noriaki Yuasa and Niisan Takahashi weren't paid legitimately, and Yuasa became a contract director without overtime pay for Gamera vs. Jiger (1970) and Gamera vs. Zigra (1971).) leading to deteriorations of the franchise, and to deaths and suicide attempts of employees, including stakeholders of the Gamera series such as Taro Marui, (Note: Marui participated in If You're Happy, Clap Your Hands (1964), Return of Daimajin (1966), and Gamera vs. Gyaos (1967) six months prior to his death. The 1964 film was Noriaki Yuasa's debut work as a director, and its commercial failure affected Yuasa's appointment for the Gamera franchise.) an unnamed staff of Gamera vs. Jiger (1970), and Mari Atsumi. A riot, losses of various materials and expertises, and disputes over the legal rights of the franchise (and Niisan Takahashi's isolation from all stakeholders) were evoked as the company was officially declared bankrupt, triggering further issues on subsequent situations in the Tokuma Shoten era.

== Overview ==
=== Conception ===
The name Gamera (ガメラ) derives from the Japanese kame ("turtle"), and the suffix -ra, a suffix shared by such other kaiju characters as Godzilla (Gojira) and Mothra. Gamera's name was spelled Gamela on a French newspaper in the 1965 film, and Gammera in the title of Gammera the Invincible, the re-titled American release of the first film in the franchise, Gamera, the Giant Monster. The character was named by Masaichi Nagata, who pushed ahead both of the production and the name to contend Godzilla, while other executives were against it for its resemblance to Godzilla, however others eventually didn't come up with any sufficient names for the turtle kaiju, along with their reluctances to resist the autocratic president.

The original idea for Gamera was developed by Yonejiro Saito, Masaichi Nagata, Hidemasa Nagata, Niisan Takahashi, and Noriaki Yuasa. The character was created as a property of the production company Daiei Film, and was intended to follow the Godzilla film series, owned by rival studio Toho. Prior to the idea of the flying turtle monster, there existed preceding concepts of a mole kaiju Moguran (Japanese: モグラン), octopus monsters Giant Octopus (Japanese: 大ダコ, Hepburn: Ōdako) and Dagora (Japanese: ダゴラ), and Nezura (Japanese: ネズラ) the rat monsters. These pre-Gamera projects resulted in failures by using live animals for filming, presumably due to the efforts to avoid the Toho-based tokusatsu techniques under the constraints from the Six-Company Agreement (Five-Company Agreement), which was led by Masaichi Nagata himself. In 2020 and 2021, Hiroto Yokokawa directed Nezura 1964 and Yatsuashi, a short film based on "Dagora".

There had been contradicting testimonies regarding the original conceptor and models of Gamera. Noriaki Yuasa believed it was Niisan Takahashi's idea, while Takahashi noted that he heard Masaichi Nagata came up with the idea of a "giant, flying turtle". (Note: Allegedly, Nagata witnessed either a turtle-shaped cloud on a small island, or a turtle-shaped small island, or he had a hallucination of a "flying turtle", during the flight to United States. This is comparable to the anecdote of Tomoyuki Tanaka to come up with the idea of Godzilla by watching the Pacific ocean during the flight from Indonesia after the failure of a co-production movie, which was one of preceding projects of Godzilla, although Tanaka's episode was later confirmed as a fabrication added later.) There had also been rumors of "lewd turtles" as the model(s) of Gamera, either true stories or jokes, among Daiei staffs including Yonejiro Saito. (Note: One inhabited a pond of a shinto shrine nearby a Daiei studio, and the other along the beach in Nagasaki Prefecture. The former was nicknamed as the "Lewd Turtle" (Japanese: スケベガメ, Hepburn: Sukebe Game). These turtles often rotated on the water-surface, and were regarded "salacious" as they showed affinities to young women. According to the rumors, the turtle in the pond usually appeared when there were female visitors, while the one in Nagasaki approached female beachgoers when they were swimming. Some of Daiei staffs believed the former as the model of Gamera, while Saito commented that a hostess from Nagasaki shared the story of the latter, possibly as a joke, and it became Gamera's model. Therefore, there had been another rumors among Daiei staffs that Gamera was originally intended to be a protector of women rather than children.) Alternatively, Tomio Sagisu, a student of Eiji Tsuburaya and had repeatedly associated with Daiei Film and crews of the Gamera and other Daiei tokusatsu productions, claimed that the concept of Gamera originates in his demo reel, while Yonesaburo Tsukiji, another student of Tsuburaya, declared it was Hidemasa Nagata's idea.

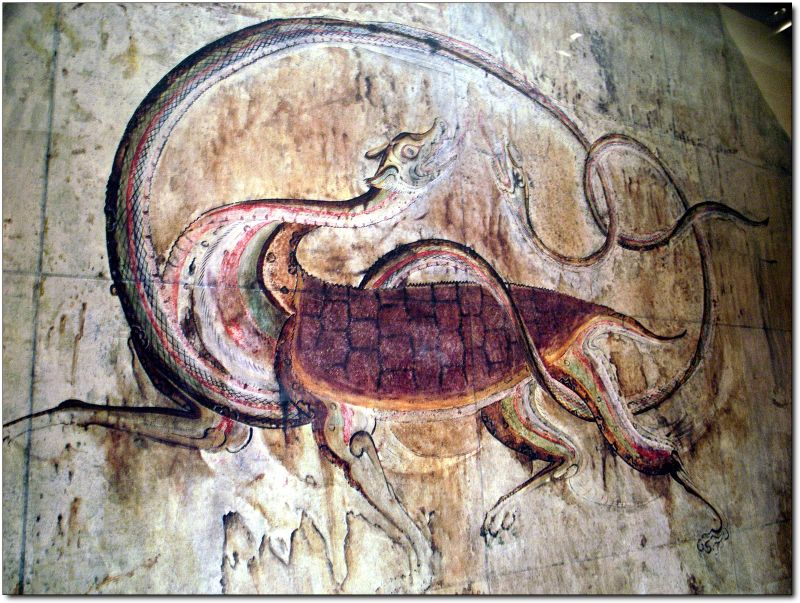
The Black Tortoise, a possible source of inspiration for Gamera.

Gamera's turtle-like design may have been inspired by the Black Tortoise, one of the Four Symbols of the Chinese constellations in East Asian mythology. The Black Tortoise is known as Genbu in Japanese, and is usually depicted as a turtle entwined together with a snake. Each of the Four Symbols are said to act as guardians over each of the four cardinal directions: with the dragon Seiryu in the east, the tiger Byakko in the west, the bird Suzaku in the south, and the tortoise Genbu in the north. In Gamera, the Giant Monster, the first film in the franchise, Gamera is depicted as awakening in the Arctic, the northernmost region on Earth. Gamera 3: Revenge of Iris, the 11th film in the franchise, contains a scene featuring a book describing the Four Symbols, including Genbu. Before the character was officially referenced to the Black Tortoise in the 1999 film, designs and background stories of Gamera and Gyaos (jp) were also inspired by ancient Chinese aspects during the production of Gamera: Guardian of the Universe while the original script of the film, so-called "Konaka Gamera" focused more on the ancient India.

- Prior to Kazunori Ito's appointment, there existed two scripts for Gamera: Guardian of the Universe, one by Chiaki and Kazuya Konaka, the other by Yoshikazu Okada. The former has been expediently referred to as "Konaka Gamera", and later served as the basis for Gamera the Brave and Gamera Rebirth, and Toei Animation's Digimon Tamers and Tsuburaya Productions's Ultraman Tiga. These plots had introduced ideas to refer kaiju to both ancient civilizations and deities.

Masaichi Nagata set the policy to make Gamera as the hero of children. Gamera's characteristics as a hero who protects humanity and animals, his energy-only diet predating Godzilla, his emerging from the north, and his liking of light and nuclear explosions were also designed to differ from Godzilla having a hatred for humanity, man-made lights, and nuclear explosions. While Godzilla may represent a terror of nuclear war, Gamera was aimed to be a contrasting character, whom children can always believe in, as an antithesis to adults trying to manipulate children with nationalism and propaganda, based on Noriaki Yuasa's own traumatic experiences of pre and post-war situations as a child. Hidemasa Nagata's intention to make the franchise child-friendly was also due to his desire to create positive emotional influences on child developments. In addition, while a nuclear explosion played roles in both Godzilla and Gamera, the Giant Monster, the latter didn't symbolize it to illustrate negative aspects of the humanity unlike the Godzilla film; while Godzilla was a victim of nuclear energy and explosion, Gamera represents such energy itself and its circulation and predated the Toho kaiju to feed on nuclear energies.

- As below-mentioned, all domestic film studios were forced to produce war propaganda films by the order of the Imperial Japanese Armed Forces, and most of Noriaki Yuasa's career as a child actor were his uncle Koji Shima's war propaganda films. A number of filmmakers, including Masaichi Nagata and Eiji Tsuburaya, who attempted to join Daiei because of Nagata prior to Godzilla (1954), were temporary purged after the World War II. The Cold War, which affected film productions such as both of Gamera and Godzilla franchises, Dr. Strangelove, and Fail Safe, used innocence of children as political tools.
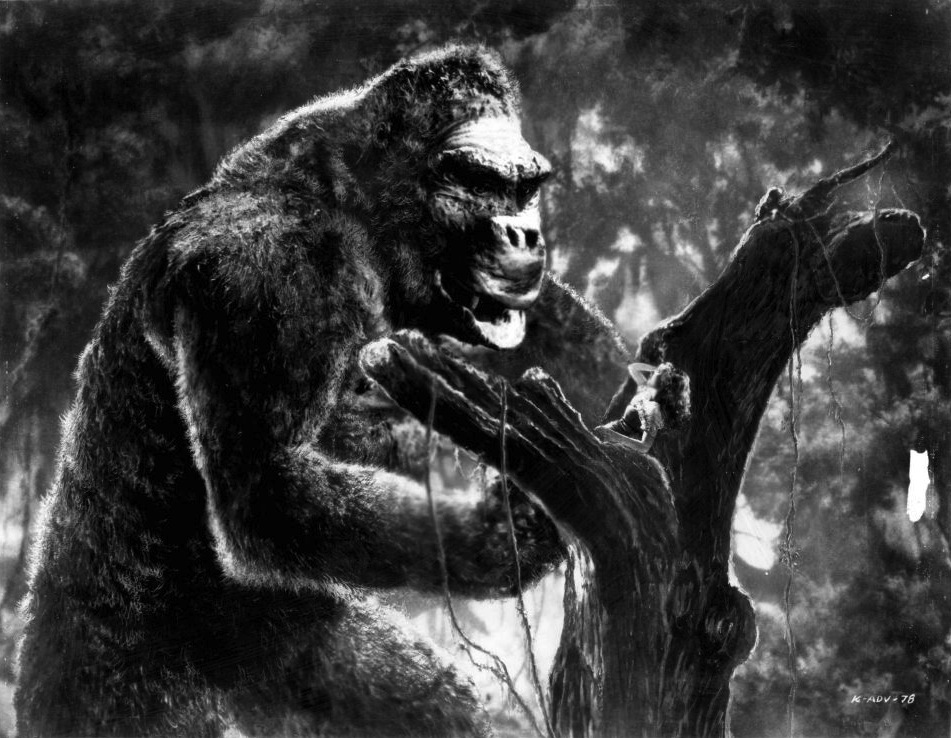
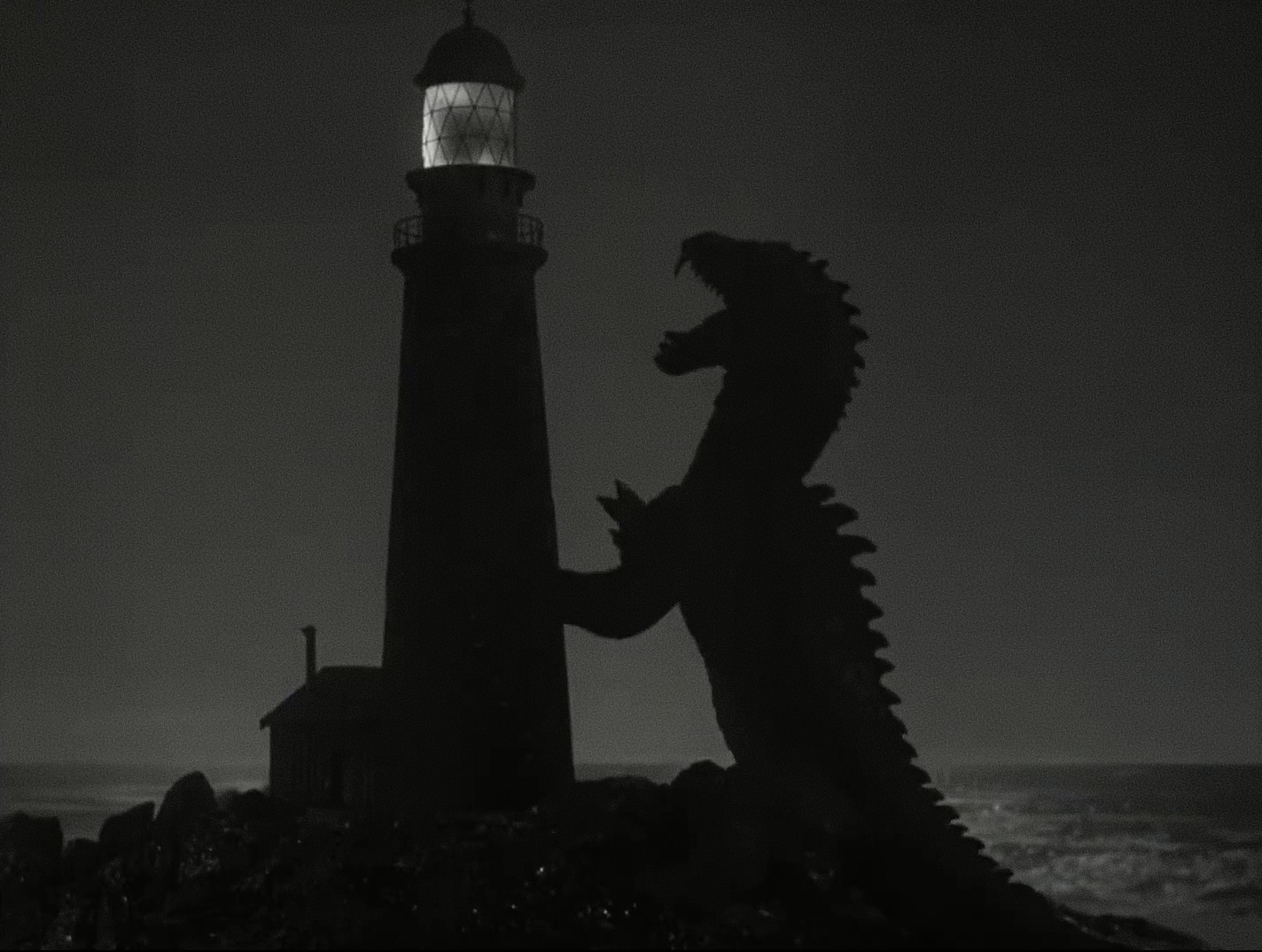
Masaichi Nagata decieded to distribute the re-released edition of King Kong in 1952 and The Beast from 20,000 Fathoms in 1954, with potential impacts both on Godzilla (1954) and the Gamera franchise. The distribution of the 1933 RKO film was the first post-war release of monster films in Japan.

Under influences from Masaichi Nagata's friend Walt Disney, Daiei Film established a foreign film department, and subsequently distributed the re-released edition of King Kong and The Beast from 20,000 Fathoms in 1952 and 1954 respectively. The former was the first post-war release of monster films in Japan, and these distributions might have influenced productions of Godzilla (1954) and the Gamera franchise. Gamera, the Giant Monster depicted the titular monster to being awoken with a nuclear explosion in the Arctic who later destroys a lighthouse, akin to The Beast from 20,000 Fathoms. There also exist minor references to the novelization of King Kong, such as relationships between titular monsters and humans and pets of the same or related motif with the titular monsters. Subsequent Gamera films in Showa and Heisei eras also bear remembrances in plot to King Kong.

In contrast to Godzilla representing a "god of destruction", Daiei's filmmakers paid attentions to zoom in on Gamera to feature him as a character with personality, and his roars were designed to be emotional with several variations to depict his emotions. During the production of the 1965 film, Noriaki Yuasa and others "became fond of" Gamera, therefore they decided not to kill him and developed a friendly side of him. A number of crews and audiences initially did not favor the idea of Gamera becoming a hero, as kaiju were generally regarded to be fearsome beings at that time.

In response to the unpopularity of Gamera vs. Barugon among children and financial and distribution weaknesses of the company (and to avoid similar directions with Toho's Godzilla series especially under the Six (Five)-Company Agreement's constraints led by Nagata himself), Gamera staffs particularly Yuasa didn't intend to make their films to be "good in quality", but being "good in performances", by appealing to young audiences to aim for additional revenues; unlike today where sales of video and DVD also contribute, theater attendances were more important at that time, therefore child-friendly films were effective to attract additional audiences (accompanying adults), and margins between tickets for children and adults were recoverable with sales of merchandise and snacks and drinks. Filmmakers focused on how not to bore child audiences, and scenes depicting Gamera performing bizarre behaviors such as acrobatic (due to the popularity of the 1964 Summer Olympics) and musical acts (to play Gamera March with Zigra's dorsal fins), and daily life of people, such as people having meals, were also inserted to attract attentions of children.

Masaichi Nagata, who pushed ahead the production of Gamera, the Giant Monster, all alone complimented the film, and rather compulsively overturned overall negative pre-release reviews of it within Daiei. Despite others, including Noriaki Yuasa himself, anticipated it to flop since the beginning, they couldn't resist Masaichi's authority and unwillingly changed their reviews. However, the film was unexpectedly successful, and even Yuasa was baffled with this.

=== Characteristics ===
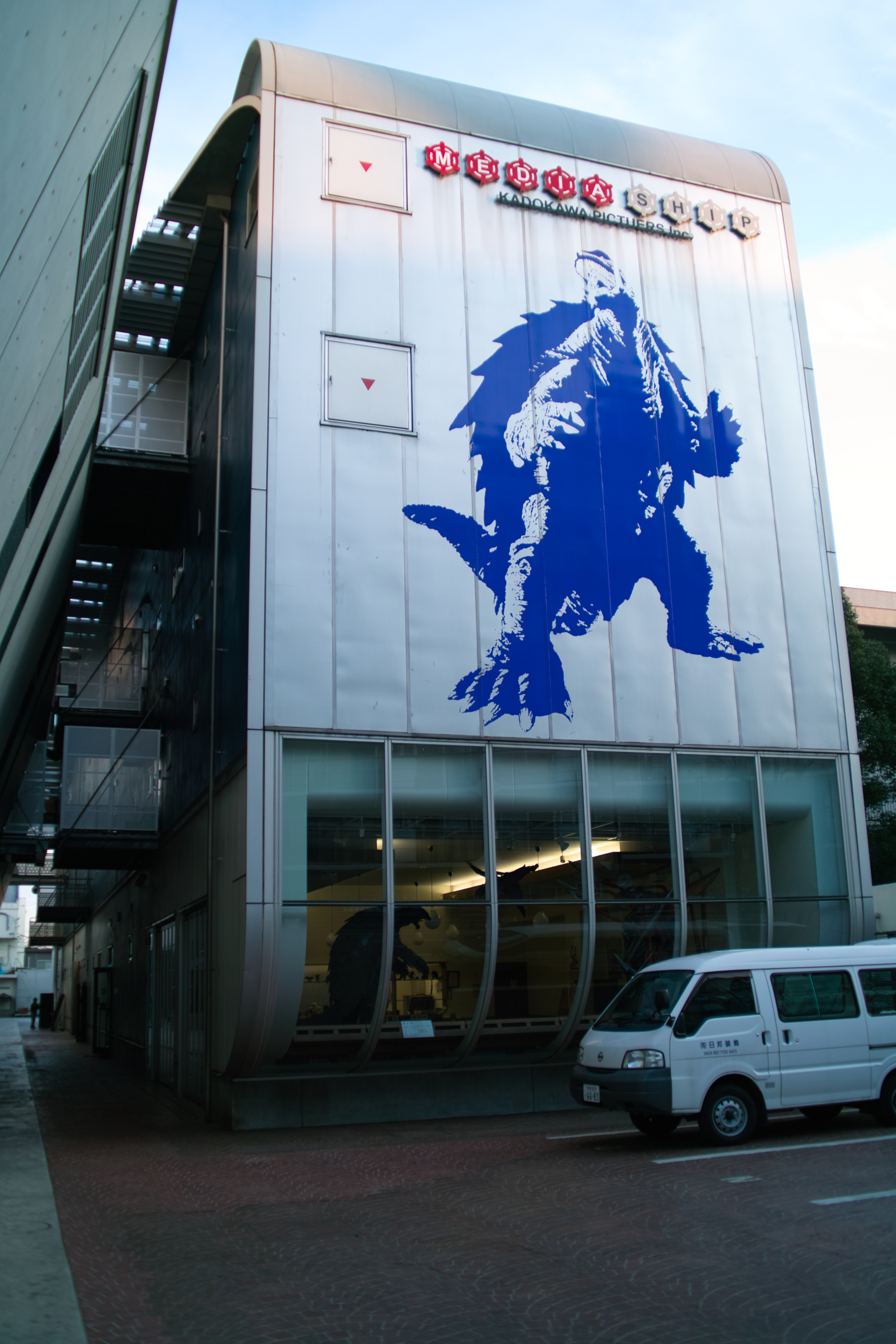
Gamera's illustration and items on display at the Kadokawa Daiei Studio office in Chōfu; the city features Gamera and related characters (Note: Daimajin and the Gamera-based character "Gachora".) and characters from (indirectly related) GeGeGe no Kitarō as mascots.

Gamera resembles an enormous prehistoric turtle, and is capable of both bipedal movement and flight. He occasionally walks on all four legs in Showa films and Gamera the Brave in 2006. He has a pronounced crest on his head, his mouth contains rows of teeth, and two tusks protrude upward from each side of his lower jaw.

He can fly by means of "jets" which can be ignited out of his limb holes when he retracts into his shell. The jets allow Gamera to rise into the air and spin, propelling him forward. In later films, he is shown to be able to fly with only his rear legs drawn inside his shell, allowing his front limbs more freedom.

Gamera's shell is presented as being incredibly resilient and strong (only ever being damaged by Guiron, Legion, Iris, and Zedus), and can deflect projectiles such as missiles. His plastron (lower shell) is more vulnerable than his carapace (upper shell).

Gamera never feeds on any fauna or plant organisms, and exclusively relies on thermal energy, electricity, radiation, and other energy sources. (Note: In the official collaborated short anime between Gamera Rebirth and Odekake Kozame, Gamera, Kozame-chan, the titular character of the manga series, and a pigeon enjoyed rice balls.) Using conventional weapons, even including nuclear weapons, against Gamera may also empower him instead, although his durability may change on occasions. (Note: Conventional weapons may disrupt Gamera's activities in the Heisei trilogy and Gamera Rebirth, and the former incarnation fell into a state of suspended animation after the annihilation of Sendai by Legion. Gamera in Gamera Rebirth himself possesses affinities to electricity and electromagnetic waves, however Jjger's electromagnetic pulse disturbed Gamera's energy shield, and Viras' electric discharges were effective on the turtle kaiju when he was on the brink of death after the battle against Guiron.)

All incarnations of the character have an affinity for humans (especially children) and nature, and protect them at all costs even by sacrificing themselves. They may also save animals, wildlife, yokai, and innocent kaiju even if they are offspring of antagonists. (Note: It was speculated that Gamera might have tried to save the baby Jiger within his body, and Gamera potentially didn't kill but sealed the adult Jiger and carried her back to her island to reseal. It was presumably an experimental attempt by film makers to highlight Gamera's benevolence, and the 1991 short film Gamera vs. Garasharp, which was based on the cancelled film project following Gamera vs. Zigra due to the bankruptcy of Daiei Film in 1971, depicted Gamera to save two hatchlings of Garasharp.) On the other hand, they may get mistaken by the humanity as a threat, and may face hostilities despite their intentions to protect and befriend with the humanity.

All incarnations of the character possess several supernatural abilities, most notably telepathy, and others such as healing and reviving humans, understanding human speech, sensing antagonistic kaiju and extraterrestrial races from afar, sharing ancient memories with humans, using life forces (mana in the Heisei trilogy) for offensive and supplemental usages, and potential reincarnation. Mystic depictions of monsters increased after the Heisei trilogy, and there have been additional powers exclusively performed in literatures by respective divine incarnations such as materialization and time manipulation. The lore of Gamera the Brave also loosely connects Gamera to a deity with supernatural depictions, however his exact origin remains unclear with the sequels of the 2006 film being cancelled.

In canonical productions, the character has never been depicted to die precisely unlike fan fictions, such as GAMERA 4-TRUTH and Gamera: The Last Hope; Gamera from Gamera: Super Monster was artificially revived in the 1994 manga Giant Monster Gamera, the "Gamera graveyard" represented in Gamera 3: Revenge of Iris was regarded as the disposal site for defective flops to create the living Gamera, and Toto is speculated to be the reincarnation of Avant Gamera in Gamera the Brave.

"Fake Gamera" (Japanese: 偽ガメラ, Hepburn: Nise Gamera), as transformations of other kaiju, had appeared in several medias as antagonists, and the cancelled 2006 anime by Yoshitomo Yonetani intended to introduce a corps of "Mechanic Gamera" (Japanese: メカニックガメラ, Hepburn: Mekanikku Gamera), a robotic imitation of the kaiju where such idea has been previously introduced in exoteric examples. (Note: Especially in tokusatsu publications from Showa and Heisei eras, "Mecha Gamera" (Japanese: メカガメラ, Hepburn: Meka Gamera) had been a concept recurringly introduced. There have been toy merchandises such as "Machine Tortoise: Mecha Game" (Japanese: マシントータス・メカガメ, Hepburn: Mashīn Tōtasu Mekagame) by Akihiko Iguchi, and several others. Additionally, the manga Gun Kid introduced Toshio Tanigami (jp)'s story of "Cannon Gamera" (Japanese: キャノンガメラ, Hepburn: Kyanon Gamera), who is an actual Gamera being armed with weapons, to fight against "Skeleton Gamera" (Japanese: スケルトンガメラ, Hepburn: Sukeruton Gamera), a villainous robot modeled after Gamera. The manga also involved Godzilla and related characters while the two kaiju didn't directly interact. Additionally, similar references have been made in Megas XLR and Voltes V and Voltes V: Legacy, and the antagonist "Gillvalis" in Ultraman Geed The Movie (2018) was originally designed with the concept of "Mecha Gamera". A social game Social Wars has also introduced respective units titled "Gamera Mech", "Fire Gamera", and "Gamera Drone".)

==== Showa ====
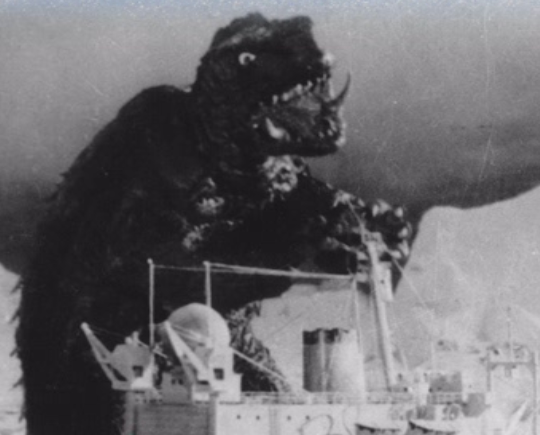
Gamera's inconsistent rampages in the first two films, where the protagonist boy from the first film was the sole defender of the misunderstood monster, might have been due to 8,000 years of starvation and confusion after the entrapment by the Atlanteans, and he intentionally attacked humanity and lured military operations to feed on their thermal energies and electricity.

During the franchise's Shōwa era, Gamera was depicted as feeding on flammable substances, such as oil and fire. According to notes by frequent series director Noriaki Yuasa, Gamera's internal anatomy includes sacs which allow him to store oil, lava, coal, and uranium. In Gamera, the Giant Monster and Gamera vs. Barugon, extreme cold temperatures are shown to weaken Gamera, although he is capable of being active in the outer space and the deep ocean. Gamera is also capable of performing additional feats including supernatural ones such as emitting electricity and electromagnetic waves, telepathy, and remote sensing. Additionally, he has a high intelligence which is used to outsmart antagonists, to tactically use artificial objects, to behave cautiously to mind humans, and to repair an alien spaceship. Gamera's intention behind bizarre displays including acrobatic and musical acts in later films (Note: Performing on a horizontal bar in Gamera vs. Guiron and playing Gamera March in Gamera vs. Zigra.) was presumably to calm and entertain children.

The original 1965 film, Gamera, the Giant Monster, depicts Gamera's origins as being a result of United States military fighters launching an attack on enemy bombers (presumably belonging to the Soviet Union), which causes the detonation of an atomic bomb on board one of the aircraft. The nuclear blast releases Gamera from a state of suspended animation in the ice. Meanwhile, a Japanese research team stumbles upon an Inuit tribe in possession of an ancient stone etching that depicts a giant turtle, which the tribe refers to as "Gamera".

His exact origin was not verified aside from his association with the ancient civilization of the Atlantis, while he was potentially known to the inhabitants on the Mu continent because of his fights against Jiger back then, as the civilization had been troubled by the parasitic monster. The Inuit fear of Gamera and his confinement in the Arctic, contrary to his heroic personality and favor of thermal energy, was presumably due to his entrapment by the Atlanteans and inherited memories of their ancestors to mistake him as a threat, along with the loss of records by Atlanteans after the demise of the ancient civilization.

His incongruous ferocity in Gamera, the Giant Monster and the beginning of Gamera vs. Barugon was presumably due to an uncontrollable starvation and confusion after 8,000 years of hibernation caused by the entrapment by the Atlanteans, (Note: Humanity feared and mistook Gamera as a threat for several factors; his tremendous size and intimidating appearance and fighting capabilities, supernatural biology, his approach to humanity because of his affinity for children and his intention to save humans in dangers, and his appetite for thermal and electric energies which are also vital for humanity. At one point, Gamera visited the Arctic to save children in danger, and he tried to feed on energy sources of the Arctic section of the Atlantis because of his disfavor of coldness and lack of volcanoes nearby, however the civilization took him as a threat for their energy sources, but failed to drive him away because of his abilities and his fondness of thermal energy of weapons. Therefore the civilization instead made him to forcefully hibernate by luring him to an ice field and entrapped him underneath an ice sheet, and imminent cooling of the planet also functioned to confine him. Demonization of Gamera by Inuit was escalated due to the loss of his information by Atlanteans after the demise of the Atlantis.) and Gamera's rampage against humanity was only to feed on thermal energy and electricity. He learned of modern human technology through the atomic bomb explosion, and his attacks on cities were also to lure military operations so that he could feed more on thermal energy of weapons. The protagonist boy (Toshio) in the 1965 film kept claiming that Gamera was not villainous but had been misunderstood by the humanity because of his hunger and loneliness. Gamera's uncontrollable appetite was gradually satisfied, and he regained his natural calmness as the films progressed, and began saving the humanity voluntarily.

- Gamera in the first film was originally planned to "cry" to cause child audiences to feel pity, sorrow, and sympathy towards the kaiju. The second and the exceptional Showa installment, Gamera vs. Barugon depicted Gamera as an antihero in general, however it was originally planned to insert a scene for Gamera to save people from Barugon's freezing breath. Additionally, the film's soundsheet had Gamera, who acts heroic and was in a cooperative relationship with the protagonist boy from the first film.

The incarnation of the character appeared in Gamera: Super Monster (1980) was depicted to be potentially a different individual from the previous films where the film itself is a new story, and a normal pond slider was magically turned into a kaiju by the spacewomen, a group of supernatural female aliens. At the end of the film, Gamera sacrificed himself to destroy the Zanon, the spaceship of the antagonists. While the 1994 manga Giant Monster Gamera depicted this as Gamera's fate, Gamera was resurrected by the descendants of Atlanteans with ancient technology of Atlantis, gaining characteristics of the Heisei trilogy Gamera, and was sent back to the ancient period to change the history to prevent his own demise, as well as to save and monitor humanity.

==== Heisei trilogy ====
Gamera, as portrayed in Gamera: Guardian of the Universe (1995)

In the franchise's Heisei period, which began with the 1995 reboot film Gamera: Guardian of the Universe, Gamera's in-universe origins were changed. In the Heisei films, Gamera is portrayed as an ancient, bio-engineered creature from Atlantis, created for the purpose of defending the people of Atlantis from Gyaos (ギャオス), a bat-like creature which breathes a destructive supersonic beam to attack. Human researchers find Gamera floating in the Pacific Ocean, encased in rock, and mistaking him for an atoll. Within the rock, they discover a large monolith explaining Gamera's origins, along with dozens of magatama made from orichalcum, which allow for a psychic link between Gamera and humans. In Gamera 3: Revenge of Iris, an undersea graveyard containing numerous Gamera-like fossils is shown. While this may suggest that the Gamera was not the only one of his kind, one character in the film refers to these fossils as "beta versions" of Gamera, possible failures in Atlantis' attempts to create the final version.

This iteration of Gamera has retractable claws within his elbows, and is shown to be able to shoot plasma fireballs from his mouth. Gamera has also been shown as being able to absorb mana from the Earth, to fire a plasma beam from his chest, and to manipulate energy to create a pseudo arm composed of fire to destroy a foe. Within the first and the third films of the trilogy, Gamera magically healed harmed humans including reviving temporarily deceased or nearly dead individuals, although he was unable to revive humans whose corpses were physically destroyed. In the 2003 comic, he was depicted to be supernaturally capable of triggering eruptions in volcanoes. Within the comic book adaptation of the 1999 film by Kazunori Ito and Moo. Nenpei, who had also published another Gamera manga Gamera vs. Morphos in 1999, Gamera performed extreme regeneration to restore his head from mimicked plasma fireballs by Iris, and defeated the antagonist with either an empowered fire blast or fireball instead of the "vanishing fist". In Gamera vs. Morphos, Gamera performed additional abilities including telepathy without a magatama, an earthquake, and a powerful fireball with himself glowing red, akin to the "Toto impact" in Gamera the Brave.

==== Gamera the Brave ====
The franchise was rebooted a second time with the 2006 film Gamera the Brave, the 12th entry in the film series. This incarnation was modeled after the African spurred tortoise, and also possesses supernatural traits such as instant growth, telepathy, comprehending human speech, sensing and foreseeing emerging evil monsters from afar, and reincarnation. Gamera's origin is unclear, while a top scientist was utterly shocked with the virtual replica of Gamera's cells and consequently committed a suicide, and Gamera has been referred to sacred entities; one of scientists described the kaiju as a deity, and some of villagers saved by Avant Gamera kept the red pearls (Note: These pearls were yielded as molluscs nearby absorbed energy from Avant Gamera after his self-destruction, and was later used as nutritional sources for Gamera himself (Toto) along with the red stone. Pearl is a specialty of the Ise-Shima region, which was previously featured in Gamera vs. Gyaos as a battleground between Gamera and Gyaos, and Gamera: Guardian of the Universe and Gamera 3: Revenge of Iris also attempted to insert battles between Gamera and Gyaos in the vicinity during their productions.) as amulets and called the objects as "fragments of the guardian angel"; the items became a center of public attentions and brought economic effects, and significantly contributed in the reconstruction of the region. Stranger children were driven by incomprehensible instincts to carry the red stone to Gamera; they somehow knew the term "Toto" and the importance of delivering it to Gamera. With the light from the stone, children also "recalled" and understood the ancient period before their births, and understood what Gamera is. Gamera (Toto) also somehow performed a judo technique which was a specialty of one of the protagonist boys presumably through telepathy. Governmental officials and scientists try to use him as a weapon against villainous kaiju while protagonists try to save him. Gamera and Gyaos were designed to be much smaller yet heavier than previous incarnations, corresponding with the "Konaka Gamera" concept. (Note: Both Gamera and Gyaos in the 2006 film are 30 to 35 meters in body heights. Within the Konaka script, Gamera and Gyaos were respective guardians of ancient civilizations that were in hostility, and they hatched from artifact-like eggs discovered from ancient underwater ruins, and instantly grew to 1 meters to 8 - 10 meters in lengths, and eventually became over 20 to 25 meters, akin to the size growth of Toto in the 2006 film.)

The opening scene of the film, set in 1973, depicts the original Gamera, called "Avant Gamera", sacrificing himself by means of self-destruction to save a coastal village from four Gyaos. 33 years later, a young boy named Toru Aizawa finds a glowing heart-shaped rock near his home, with a small egg lying on top of it. A baby turtle hatches from the egg, and begins to grow in size at an alarming rate. The turtle, dubbed "Toto" by Toru after his own nickname by his deceased mother, quickly forms a bond with the boy and develops the ability to breathe fire and fly. After consuming the glowing rock found with his egg, Toto fully transforms into the next incarnation of Gamera, gaining the power to defeat a lizard-like monster known as Zedus. Zedus was once a normal reptile, but turned into a kaiju by feeding on Gyaos' corpse, and was presumably controlled by the vengeful spirits of the villainous flying creatures.

In one of novelizations, additional mutants spawned from Gyaos cells made appearances, including Space Gyaos, Barugon, (Note: Depictions of Toto and Barugon from one of comics for the Heisei trilogy (jp) somewhat bear resemblances; both characters hatched from eggs and produced multiple jewel-like energy sources and grow rapidly by collecting them.) Viras, Guiron, Jiger and its offspring, and Zigra, and Toto fought against a legion of these kaiju.

==== Gamera Rebirth ====
Gamera Rebirth, the first installation in the Reiwa era introduced monsters' characteristics to represent not only homages to previous films but also some of unused ideas of previous films and scrapped projects. All kaiju in this series are artificial life forms created by ancient civilizations for warfare and to control the overpopulation of humanity. This incarnation of Gamera was also originally created for mass-massacres, however he was re-programmed by a rebellious figure to become the protector of civilians from other kaiju. During the downfalls of ancient civilizations, Gamera presumably stood against 24 different kaiju to protect the humanity.

While previous incarnations of the character possessed affinities to elements most notably fire, electricity, plasma energy, electromagnetic pulse, and jamming, Gamera in Gamera Rebirth further expanded combat attributes to include gravitation, an energy shield, and baryon. (Note: The Heisei trilogy originally planned to depict Gamera to perform an energy-shield-like ability.) This incarnation also possesses several supernatural traits such as telepathy, a psychic link with humans, interfering mental contact by other kaiju on humans, bestowing a power to sense presence of other kaiju on children, and his name itself contains a power to somehow encourage specific children and makes humans to feel that the name "Gamera" is the correct one.

Gamera appeared to protect children from other monsters trying to feed on children and other humans. Through battle, Gamera was severely damaged and nearly died. During the battle against S-Gyaos, an enormous Gyaos mutant who fed on Viras' corpse, Gamera was injected with specific RNA viruses to reprogram him for the original usage. However, Gamera managed to regain his consciousness by willpower and a telepathic link with a boy. To prevent himself from being enslaved for carnage, Gamera sacrificed himself to destroy the Moonbase of the antagonists, the descendants of nobles of an ancient civilization who were using kaiju. Using all of his remaining power for the planet-penetrating Charged Baryon Cannon, the "Moon Buster", Gamera dissolved into ashes, leaving behind an egg for the new incarnation of Gamera who strongly resembles Toto from the 2006 film.

==== Others ====
There have been multiple other incarnations of the character appeared in various other mediums from novelizations to manga and video games.

The origin of the Gamera appeared in the 1995 novel Gamera vs. Phoenix by Niisan Takahashi, which was redeveloped from a script for a cancelled film in 1994, is unclear. Showa era Gamera defeated villainous kaiju like in previous films while the "new" Gamera who emerged from underneath the Nazca Lines possessed characteristics of the 1995 film Gamera: Guardian of the Universe. This "new" Gamera initially attacked chemical plants all over the world, resulting in hostility from humanity, though his intention was to prevent an oncoming catastrophe caused by environmental degradations and to warn humanity. After sealing the Phoenix, an immortal but suicidal, fiery entity constantly suffering due to its immortality, the new Gamera sacrificed himself to save the Earth from further destruction caused by harmful sunlight triggered by air pollution, following a similar fate as the Phoenix where both monsters cannot die for the sake of the planet which was damaged by humanity.

The incarnation of the character, the "Black Tortoise", appeared in The Great Yokai War: Guardians Side Story: Heian Hundred Demon Tale (Japanese: 妖怪大戦争ガーディアンズ外伝 平安百鬼譚, Hepburn: Yōkai Daisensō Gādianzu Gaiden Heian Hyakkitan), a spin-off novelization of the 2021 film The Great Yokai War: Guardians by Takashi Miike, was uniquely portrayed to be an actual goddess. This incarnation was capable of various supernatural abilities such as materialization, human speech, and making yokai and humans they have known her since childhood even if it is their first encounter with her. In spirit-like form, she appeared from Mount Ooe and surrounding mountains north of Heian-kyō (Kyoto) and manifested a physical form and battled Nue, a gigantic yokai being empowered by vengeful Abe no Seimei to save the world from antagonistic humans and yokai. Gamera overwhelmed and severely weakened Nue with her fireballs and spinning jet, and left the rest to yokai and humans so they could fulfill their destiny, and secretly disappeared (dematerialized).

- While Gamera was previously mentioned in Miike's The Great Yokai War (2005), the 2021 film and its novels were the first direct appearances of Gamera and Daimajin in the Yokai Monsters franchise, where Miike's attempt to revive Daimajin was cancelled due to the box office result of Gamera the Brave, but was instead redeveloped as Daimajin Kanon. The settings of the novel were presumed references to classic Daiei films such as The Demon of Mount Oe (1960), and GeGeGe no Kitarō, and lyrics of Gamera March, Song of Gamera, The Myth, and GeGeGe no Kitarō's Song were used during the battle between Gamera and Nue.

The presence of the "Black Tortoise" was also confirmed in the 2015 novel Holy Beast War Chronicle: White Shadow (聖獣戦記 白い影, Seijū Senki – Shiroi Kage), a tribute to Masaichi Nagata and his Nichiren-themed films. The author Shinichiro Inoue has published literatures about Gamera and Daimajin, and has participated in both Daimajin Kanon and Gamera Rebirth; his attempt to revive the franchise was also redeveloped as the 2015 anniversary short film. In this novel, Barugon and Jiger directly appeared as the Azure Dragon and the White Tiger, respectively. Each monster is a spiritual and sacred entity, being regarded as deities with supernatural powers such as telepathy, weaponizing the weather, energy beams, levitation, and time manipulation. These monsters choose specific humans as summoners and form supernatural links with them through magatamas, and bestow them superpowers. The chosen ones can summon materialized monsters to perform tremendous feats, however, if summoners use monsters for destructive deeds, the world would be spiritually poisoned and requires other members of the Four Symbols (and their chosen ones) to purify. Nichiren, the current summoner of the Black Tortoise who was also bestowed abilities including a time manipulation, tried to restore the world after the battle of Barugon and Jiger during the Mongol invasions of Japan.

Gamera made several appearances in the two tokusatsu television series Sailor Fight! and Cosplay Warrior Cutie Knight series (Ver.1.0, Ver.1.3, 2: Revenge of the Empire) in 1995 and 1996 (as a "Capsule Monster" in the 1996 video, presumably based on similarly styled characters from Ultra Seven, which later inspired Pokémon. Noriaki Yuasa (Note: Yuasa directed Ultraman 80 which later influenced the Heisei Gamera trilogy along with Ultraman Powered. Yuasa was originally appointed for Mirrorman before Ultraman 80, and later participated in other related productions such as Anime-chan and Princess Comet.) directed a related 1996 video Cosplay Warrior Cutie Knight 2: Revenge of the Empire and appeared in it as the character "Dr. Yuasa", making it his posthumous work. Hurricane Ryu, who was also working for the 1994 manga Giant Monster Gamera, played Gamera in the video.

In the 2015 short film to commemorate the 50th anniversary of the franchise, Gamera saved a boy from a swarm of Gyaos attacking Tokyo and incinerated them with a powerful fire blast. A decade later, another monster appeared in Tokyo to cause havoc, and the boy again witnessed Gamera returns to fight it.

Within the USO Makoto Yōkai Hyaku Monogatari series by Natsuhiko Kyogoku, in which multiple Kadokawa stakeholders, Daiei (Kadokawa)-related characters, (Note: Gamera, Daimajin, Daimon the vampire, Sadako Yamamura, Yasunori Katō, Kayako Saeki, Toshio Saeki, and so on.) and characters from GeGeGe no Kitarō made cameo appearances as unsubstantial entities along with various other characters from multiple different franchises. (Note: From Godzilla franchise, Ultraman franchise, Gappa: The Triphibian Monster, Yo-kai Watch franchise, Inuyasha franchise, Ushio to Tora, Beyond Twilight, Natsume's Book of Friends, Hozuki's Coolheadedness, and so on.) (Note: Multiple other characters from many other franchises were also directly mentioned and appeared indirectly.)

== Relationship with Godzilla ==
=== Overview ===
Both Gamera and Godzilla franchises have played significant roles in expanding modern culture in Japan, affecting many other mediums, and have influenced each other on various occasions. Filmmakers and producers from the two franchises did not have particular senses of rivalry, and have paid respects to each other. Both along with other tokusatsu productions, most notably Daimajin and Tsuburaya's Ultra Q and Ultraman franchises, formed the First Kaiju Boom, which became the basis for the Second Kaiju Boom and the Yōkai / Kaiki Boom. Despite the restraints by the Six-Company Agreement, which was led by Masaichi Nagata himself, the success of Daiei Film's own Gamera prompted non-Toho kaiju productions. This, and Masaichi's contributions in the launching of the Japanese Film Export Promotion Association, encouraged the Japanese government to value kaiju and tokusatsu productions for exports, and the First Kaiju Boom became a social phenomenon with notable influences on modern popular cultures in Japan.

Daiei Film's objective was not to surpass the Godzilla franchise, but to coexist with it, and the Gamera franchise achieved differentiation from Toho productions, gained popularity notably among children, and rivaled the Godzilla franchise.

Daiei's bankruptcy and diminished public recognition of Gamera in comparison to Godzilla furtherly worsened the situation of the former franchise. Especially by global and post-Daiei domestic perspectives, Gamera has often been described as a cheap, uncool, and inferior rip-off of Godzilla, and such impressions along with declined public recognitions and limited advertisements and media attentions have negatively affected the franchise most notably on box office results of post-Daiei productions, furtherly hindering revival attempts by Tokuma Shoten and Kadokawa Corporation.

On the other hand, Masaichi Nagata's intention to explore potentials for giant monster films began with the releases of King Kong and The Beast from 20,000 Fathoms, and potentially influenced the production of Godzilla (1954), aside from Eiji Tsuburaya and others' early associations with Nagata and Daiei Film prior to their eventual returns to Toho; they participated in Japan's first post-war science fiction tokusatsu films by Daiei with their intentions to join the company, and Godzilla franchise was later launched. Following the Gamera-related Warning from Space (1956) which was the first-colored tokusatsu film in Japan, (Note: Warning from Space might have influenced Toho productions such as Invasion of Astro-Monster and Gorath, where Toru Matoba joined Tsuburaya Production and participated in Eiji Tsuburaya's Ultra Q and Ultraman franchises. The director Koji Shima is both the uncle and a teacher of Noriaki Yuasa and Yuasa participated in the film as an extra, and expertise and sound effects from Warning from Space were used for Gamera films. A script based on a scrapped Gamera film to feature both Gamera and Pairan was published on the book, which was advised by Yuasa and others, and an extraterrestrial race based on Pairan appeared in the 1994 comic series Giant Monster Gamera.) Daiei produced its first kaiju film The Whale God in 1962, (Note: The Whale God was written by Kōichirō Uno, and Kōichirō Uno's Wet and Swinging was the first career of Shusuke Kaneko as a film director. Fuminori Ohashi and Ryosaku Takayama co-participated in The Whale God, and Ohashi lessoned Takayama for Tsuburaya Productions's Ultra Q after The Whale God.) (Note: Gamera 3: Revenge of Iris had presumably tried to insert a reference to the 1962 film for Gamera to briefly interact with a cow-calf pair of North Pacific right whales. Additionally, the 1995 book, in which Noriaki Yuasa and Niisan Takahashi and Masao Yagi participated, features a scenario based on a scrapped film due to the bankruptcy of Daiei Film for Gamera and Whale God along with Pairan and Nezura and some resurrected kaiju to protect the Earth.) and the company's attempt to create its own monster franchises resulted in the failures of the aforementioned Dagora and Nezura presumably to avoid using Toho-based techniques and styles for the Six-Company Agreement led by Masaichi Nagata himself; its aftermath triggered additional issues on the near-bankrupt company, and "Gamera" was instead produced eventually. As below-mentioned, both franchises various stakeholders in productions, and Toho has distributed Daiei productions including the Heisei Gamera trilogy.

Godzilla films including later Showa films, (Note: The 1956 film Warning from Space might have influenced Toho productions such as Invasion of Astro-Monster and Gorath, where its director Koji Shima is the uncle and a teacher of Noriaki Yuasa and Yuasa participated in the film as an extra, and expertise and sound effects from Warning from Space were used for Gamera films. A script based on a scrapped Gamera film to feature both Gamera and Pairan was published on the book, which was advised by Yuasa and others, and an extraterrestrial race based on Pairan appeared in the 1994 comic series Giant Monster Gamera.) Godzilla vs. SpaceGodzilla (1994), Godzilla vs. Destoroyah (1995), Godzilla 2000 (1999), Godzilla vs. Megaguirus (2000), Godzilla, Mothra and King Ghidorah: Giant Monsters All-Out Attack (GMK) (2001), Shin Godzilla (2016), Godzilla Minus One (2023), and MonsterVerse series by Legendary Pictures which involved Ken Watanabe, have been pointed out to be influenced by Showa Gamera films and Shusuke Kaneko's Heisei Gamera trilogy and GMK. Gamera was represented within a concept art of Godzilla: King of the Monsters, and Kaneko himself acknowledges similarities between his films and MonsterVerse films where the scrapped 2011 project Gamera 3D by Yoshimitsu Banno served as one of predecessors of the 2014 film Godzilla. According to Jared Krichevsky, "Shimo" appeared in Godzilla x Kong: The New Empire was partially inspired by Barugon. Shusuke Kaneko used some aspects of Showa Gamera and his Heisei Gamera trilogy for GMK such as "submarine within kaiju's body" from Gamera vs. Jiger, and Kaneko reused ideas which he originally wanted for the Heisei trilogy and its cancelled sequel(s).

Eiji Tsuburaya depicted Godzilla to be more heroic and to bleed in later Showa films despite disliking bleeding kaiju, and having avoided this in previous Showa films due to his belief in Christianity. Later Showa Godzilla films featured more child-friendly aspects, emotional interactions between kaiju and children, introducing theme songs, (Note: Particularly, the Kaiju March by Shinichi Sekizawa was influenced by the Gamera March where Noriaki Yuasa and Sekizawa were students of Hiroshi Shimizu, and both favored child-friendly directions. Titles of these songs were also presumed references to the "Kaiju Daisenso March" by Akira Ifukube where Ifukube participated in The Whale God and the Daimajin franchise, and Ifukube's students such as Tadashi Yamanouchi worked for Gamera and other Daiei Film productions.) depicting kaiju as characters than monsters with increased scenes to zoom in on kaiju, increasing the number of scenes involving kaiju, and adding more fancifully designed kaiju. Yoshimitsu Banno, who later planned to direct Gamera 3D, made Godzilla to fly (Note: Godzilla vs. Hedorah was Banno's debut as a film director, and Banno devised the idea for Godzilla to fly. However, Tomoyuki Tanaka was suddenly hospitalized when Banno was about to ask Tanaka to get permission to use that idea. Therefore chief director Kazuo Baba was instead delegated, and Baba permitted Banno's idea. However, Tanaka was dissatisfied with both Banno and his idea, and Banno was left out from directing Toho tokusatsu films, where his next Godzilla film was also scrapped due to this.) in his Godzilla vs. Hedorah. (Note: The film was released a week after Gamera vs. Zigra where both films focused on environmental affairs.) These later Showa Godzilla films were presumably influenced by Gamera. The creations of Minilla (a child-friendly son of Godzilla) and Kamoebas (jp), Toho's own turtle kaiju, were also possibly influenced by the Gamera franchise where possible references between the two turtle kaiju had been made in later Godzilla productions. Feeding behaviors relying on nuclear energy by titular kaiju was also initially introduced in the Gamera franchise. On the other hand, Toto in the 2006 film Gamera the Brave in return bears physical and conceptual similarities to Minilla, Godzilla Junior in the 1994 film Godzilla vs. SpaceGodzilla, and Daigoro vs. Goliath (1972) by Toho and Tsuburaya Productions, where the 1972 film was instead influenced by Gamera. While Gamera the Brave re-used the original script of Gamera: Guardian of the Universe, which also affected productions of Digimon Tamers and Ultraman Tiga, the plot of the 2006 film was also influenced by the Heisei Mothra trilogy where crews such as Nippon Eizo Creative had participated in both productions.

Ishiro Honda highly praised the 1967 film Gamera vs. Gyaos, pleasing Niisan Takahashi greatly and freeing him from his feeling of inferiority towards the Godzilla franchise, and Honda suggested Takahashi to work together in the future. There was a failed attempt to produce a Daimajin film involving Honda in the 1980s, and Takahashi later sent his script for the cancelled 1994 film, which later became the basis of the novel Gamera vs. Phoenix, to several tokusatsu film makers including Honda; however, despite Honda's encouragement, Takahashi's attempt failed to materialize.

- On the other hand, Honda himself was among those (such as Yukiko Takayama) who were concerned with Godzilla's transition into a heroic and child-friendly character and emphasized the importance to stay loyal to its original concept to represent fears and destructions, where the franchise also faced financial difficulties to continue destructions of urban areas by Godzilla and other monsters. As aforementioned, the Japanese film industry itself was declining and resulted in bankruptcies of major companies most notably Daiei Film and Shintoho (which originated in Toho), and this was also due to the recession of Japanese economy at that time, and the competition against the rising television industry, which was ironically boosted by the two "Kaiju Booms" (jp)(jp) involving Eiji Tsuburaya and other stakeholders from both Gamera and Godzilla franchises, while the two franchises had significant influences on these television productions. Following the temporal hiatus of the Toho franchise after Terror of Mechagodzilla (1975) for decreased box office results, its Heisei era installments beginning with The Return of Godzilla (1984) rebooted the monster with more original-esque characterizations.

The Six-Company Agreement led by Masaichi Nagata prevented other companies from easily chasing after the success of Toho, and the Godzilla franchise didn't have notable competitors until the Gamera franchise; the agreement ironically made Daiei Film's own Dagora and Nezura to fail by using live animals (octopuses and rats) to avoid the Toho-style, and Daiei Film changed the direction for Gamera, the Giant Monster. As below mentioned, non-Toho kaiju productions suddenly increased after Daiei's The Whale God and early Gamera films, which were produced under Masaichi Nagata, and the aforementioned First Kaiju Boom became an influential social phenomenon among post-war Japanese popular cultures.

- Masaichi Nagata's intentions to save the declining domestic film industry including the Godzilla franchise, and to export "kaiju" and "tokusatsu" productions for global markets also influenced the castings of later Showa Gamera films. Involvements of foreign cast members and enhanced childish direction began in Gamera vs. Viras due to requests from global buyers, because of governmental attempt to acquire foreign currencies (as a result of Nagata's attempts) and to support struggling Japanese film industries of that time, (Nagata had previously tried to export Japanese films to support the post-war reconstruction of the Japanese economy in the early 1950s), partially due to the recession of Japanese economy and the prosperity of television including Tsuburaya's Ultraman by increasing film exports to global market; ironically the success of the Gamera franchise indirectly contributed in this situation and the arise of the "Yokai Boom" for cost-effectiveness. The Japanese Film Export Promotion Association (Japanese: 日本映画輸出振興協会, Hepburn: Nihon Eiga Yusyutsu Shinkō Kyōkai) was established, and Gamera vs. Gyaos obtained a loan from the association. The establishment of the association was largely influenced by Masaichi, who was also called as the "Fixer of the political world" (Japanese: 政界の黒幕, Hepburn: Seikai no Kuromaku) for his connections with political circles. Subsequent kaiju and tokusatsu films, not only Gamera vs. Gyaos and Wrath of Daimajin and other Daiei Film productions such as critically acclaimed Botan Dōrō and The Snow Woman, but also various others such as Gappa: The Triphibian Monster and The X from Outer Space by Eiji Tsuburaya's team, obtained tax-based loans from the association.
  - Despite positive reviews and domestic popularities of these (tokusatsu and non-tokusatsu) films, many of their exports, even including tokusatsu productions, ended up in deficits mostly due to culturally unfamiliar themes (even yokai) akin to the previous situations of Daiei's acclaimed literary movies such as Nagata's Rashomon. However, while Nagata's intention to save the industry wasn't rewarded in a broad perspective, kaiju and kaijin productions were among few exceptions and succeeded to gain global fan bases. Nagata was later entitled as the "Father of the cinema" (Japanese: 映画界の父, Hepburn: Eigakai no Chichi) for his contributions to the domestic film industry. On the other hand, Nagata's efforts also contributed in the launching of the "Kaiju Booms", which itself involved participants from Gamera and Godzilla franchises. The booms played important roles in the rise of the television industry, and this new industry became the biggest competitor of the film industry and caused its decline, including Daiei itself.

=== Joint appearances ===
Although the two franchises have often influenced and referenced each other and there existed attempts to conduct direct crossovers, Gamera and Godzilla have never met onscreen officially as of 2026.

During the production of Gamera: Guardian of the Universe in 1995, Yasuyoshi Tokuma, the founder of Tokuma Shoten and the executive producer of the Heisei trilogy, expressed his interest in producing Godzilla vs. Gamera and proposed a crossover to Toho, however this attempt failed to materialize, and Yasuyoshi's death in 2000 and the financial situation of Tokuma Shoten eventually resulted in the disposal of Daiei Film properties, along with the cancellation of "Gamera 4" due to box office results and limited revenues of the trilogy that were caused by multiple factors, the destruction scenes by Gamera in Gamera 3: Revenge of Iris, and the planned plot of the scrapped sequel.

In 2002, Kadokawa acquired the copyrights of Daiei Film properties from Tokuma Shoten, and Kazuo Kuroi announced a crossover plan between Gamera and Godzilla, along with a plan to reboot Daimajin. The company approached Toho to achieve it, however the latter turned down the offer and Kadokawa therefore produced Gamera the Brave instead as Toho temporary ceased Godzilla productions after Godzilla: Final Wars (Note: Gamera the Brave Heisei Mothra trilogy (which affected Gamera the Brave) and Godzilla: Final Wars share crews such as Nippon Eizo Creative.). Zedus, the main antagonist of the 2006 film was intentionally designed to resemble Toho monsters such as Varan and Gorosaurus, TriStar Pictures' Godzilla, and it notably resembles both Toho's Godzilla and Jirahs, the Godzilla-based kaiju from Ultraman. (Note: Both Gamera the Brave and the cancelled sequel of the 1998 film Godzilla by TriStar Pictures feature the titular monsters to be raised by human protagonists, and civilians protecting the titular monsters from military forces at the end of each respective film. According to Tomoo Haraguchi, many of early designs of Zedus coincidentally resembled MUTO in MonsterVerse series by Legendary Pictures which made its debut in 2014.) Shogo Tomiyama was aware of the demand for the crossover, however he questioned the concept's captivation for differentiated characteristics of both monsters, and clarified the crossover lacking merits for filmmakers, Additionally, Shusuke Kaneko has also expressed his interest in producing a crossover.

In 2023, the Netflix series Gamera Rebirth was directed by Hiroyuki Seshita who previously directed the anime Godzilla trilogy. This time, Toho instead proposed an offer for a crossover due to a large number of requests from players of the mobile game Godzilla Battle Line, and an official collaboration between the Netflix series and the mobile game was made where Seshita's incarnation of Godzilla was chosen for the key art, followed by additional contents.

Additionally, Masaaki Tezuka once suggested using Gamera instead of the aforementioned Kamoebas (jp) for the 2003 film Godzilla: Tokyo S.O.S., and the novelization of the anime Godzilla trilogy by Hiroyuki Seshita, who later directed Gamera Rebirth, made a possible reference to Kamoebas in the 2003 film and Gamera as the "Kamoebas IV" who was slain by Godzilla. Additionally. Gamera was at one point considered to appear in the 2007 video game Godzilla: Unleashed while the 1999 video game Gamera Dream Battle was able to connect to Mothra Dream Battle in which Mothra and King Ghidorah appeared as playable characters.

Gamera's voice effect was used in Godzilla vs. King Ghidorah, and Gamera was represented within a concept art of Godzilla: King of the Monsters, and additional Godzilla productions, such as Godzilla: The Series, aforementioned series (the anime Godzilla trilogy and MonsterVerse), Godzilla: Final Wars, and Godzilla Movie Studio Tour have presumed references to Gamera. Atelier Koganemushi, who had produced a puppetry show which involved Gamera, Godzilla, King Ghidorah, Ultraman, Kamen Rider, and additional characters from different franchises, later produced the Godziban series, and had sporadically introduced Gamera references into the series. On the other hand, Gamera: Super Monster had a brief parody to Godzilla.

==== References and parodies ====
Gamera and Godzilla and other characters from respective and related franchises (including Daimajin and Yokai) co-appeared in several exoteric productions and events, and some of them directly involved stakeholders from both franchises. In Showa, these characters had been featured together and interacted each other on multiple occasions on magazines. Additional cases include Dr. Slump and Dragon Ball, The Simpsons, Urusei Yatsura, (Note: As below mentioned, Gamera and Gyaos and Daimajin made cameo appearances in Urusei Yatsura which also had influences on the productions of the Heisei Gamera trilogy, and a minor crossover with Inuyasha was also made in USO Makoto Yōkai Hyaku Monogatari.) Daicon III and IV Opening Animations, (Note: Later mentioned Hideaki Anno was involved in Daicon III, and Daicon Films (Gainax) produced the 1985 fan film Yamata no Orochi no Gyakushū, the first kaiju career of Shinji Higuchi.) MegaTokyo, City Shrouded in Shadow, GigaBash, Robot Chicken, The Slammie Brothers vs. Godzilla and Gamera, USO Makoto Yōkai Hyaku Monogatari, miscellaneous comics, stage and puppetry shows, and television shows (jp)(jp)(jp).

Several franchises and merchandises, such as the aforementioned Dr. Slump, Detective Conan, Sailor Moon SuperS, and Jumbo Monster GOMERA have characters with the names "Gamera" and "Godzilla". In response to the bankruptcy of Daiei, a novel The Flute of Gomera was published, with its title referencing to both Gamera and Godzilla. It situated Yonesaburo Tsukiji as the protagonist, and featured the difficulties that Daiei's tokusatsu crews had faced. There had also been various toy merchandises, generally refereed as "Pachimon" (Japanese: パチモン, Hepburn: Pachimon), literally meaning "counterfeit" (jp), based on various tokusatsu characters by major studios including Gamera and Godzilla and Ultraman franchises.

In 2005, Shusuke Kaneko directed the 11th episode on Ultraman Max, choosing to include a scene of children playing with toys of Gamera and Godzilla as a reference to the films he had directed in both franchises. (Note: Kaneko received permission from both Kadokawa and Shōgo Tomiyama for this scene; however, due to copyright issues, the scene was removed from the DVD release.) Ayako Fujitani also made an appearance as a guest in the episode.

On the other hand, Kaneko's attempt to make Gamera to appear in his live-film adaptation of Minna Agechau (1985), which originally intended to involve Kazunori Ito and use the aforementioned Gappa, and Shinji Higuchi indirectly participated in. The film included various vulgar references to classic characters such as Godzilla, King Ghidorah, Mother of Ultra, Indiana Jones, and below-mentioned Bruce Lee, however Tokuma Shoten turned this down while using Mother of Ultra eventually resulted in Kaneko's connections with Tsuburaya Production, and influenced productions of The Samurai (jp), and the below-mentioned scrapped Ultra Q project and Ultraman Max, whose productions are related to the Heisei Gamera trilogy. (Note: As it was a Nikkatsu film, Kaneko originally intended to use Gappa, however Gappa's suits were already nonexistent. Then a stakeholder of Tokuma Shoten (Daiei) instead suggested to use Gamera and negotiate with Daiei for two reasons; the close intercompany relationship since the Dainichi Eihai and its distributions of Gamera vs. Zigra and other films and their studios in Chōfu were nearby. Masaichi Nagata and Eiji Tsuburaya had also associated with Nikkatsu before Daiei Film since the early 1930s. However, Daiei was dissatisfied with Chiho Katsura's idea to introduce sexual interactions to involve Gamera to protect the images of the character. Therefore, they picked one of rental kaiju suits by Ex Productions, who have participated in Gamera and Daiei productions, and changed Gamera (Daiei)-related aspects and appointed a voice actor of The Monster Kid.) (Note: Akio Jissoji's Ultraman video film (jp) influenced the direction of Gamera: Super Monster, and the two films were double featured in Nagoya. Jissoji later directed the 1990 Ultra Q movie (jp) based on the scrapped project by Shusuke Kaneko and Kazunori Ito and Shinji Higuchi; it was one of predecessors of the Heisei Gamera trilogy that Kaneko and Ito reused some of their ideas of the Ultra Q project for the Heisei Gamera trilogy. Jissoji also participated in Ultraman Max, and Tokyo: The Last Megalopolis; Yasunori Katō later formed minor connections with Gamera and Daimajin, and Tomoo Haraguchi and Toshio Miike and Shinji Higuchi gained expertise from the 1988 film and used them for the Heisei Gamera trilogy.)

- Minna Agechau is an installment of the "Nikkatsu Roman Porno" series, which was conceived as a breakthrough for Nikkatsu to overcome the company's own financial difficulties amid the entire decline of the domestic cinema. The roman series became an important career for Kaneko.

The 1998 Shochiku film Giant Monsters Appear in Tokyo represented off-screen appearances of two battling kaiju, the "jet-flying turtle appeared on Fukuoka" and the "80 meters tall, fire-breathing, bipedal, carnivorous dinosaur-like lizard appeared on the port of Tokyo Bay", clearly referencing Gamera in Gamera: Guardian of the Universe and Godzilla in The Return of Godzilla where several casts from the Heisei Gamera Trilogy such as Hirotarō Honda and Tomorowo Taguchi appeared in the film.

- Shochiku distributed Gamera the Brave in 2006. Simultaneously, the initial concepts for What to Do with the Dead Kaiju? (2022) was proposed in the same year to use Gamera's corpse instead.

Shinpei Hayashiya, known for his independent kaiju films including Godzilla vs. Deathgilas (2001) and GAMERA 4-TRUTH (2003), produced War of the Ninja Monsters: Jaron Vs. Goura (Japanese: 忍獣大戦記 蛇龍対號羅, Hepburn: Ninjū Taisenki Jaron tai Gōra) in 2023 as a presumed reference to both Gamera and Godzilla. Its production involved stakeholders including suit actors Mizuho Yoshida and Akira Ohashi, (Note: Additional notable participants include Shinji Nishikawa, Hirokatsu Kihara, Masayuki Nagata, Yasuhiro Ueda, Makoto Inamiya, Akihiko Nawashima, Kenji Tanokura, and so on.) and Shusuke Kaneko supported its crowdfunding.

=== Productions ===
Daiei Film produced and distributed films that played major roles in forming tokusatsu and kaiju genre under Masaichi Nagata, one of creators of Gamera. After the dissolution of the Dai Nippon Film following the end of the World War II, Nagata, who was the chief founder and the vice president of Dai Nippon Film, instead launched a new company Daiei Film. Since then, Nagata emphasized to develop diverse tokusatsu productions as one of core strategies, ranging from historical drama to disaster, thriller, classic novels, romance, horror, fantasy, science fiction, and so on. These films especially themed wars, historical events, natural and animal disasters, extraterrestrial life, yōkai, ghost, kaijin such as Tetsu no tsume (1951), and kaiju.

Nagata's intentions made the company to distribute foreign films, such as Disney productions due to Masaichi's connections with Walt Disney, and to produce innovative productions, resulting in the productions of the first post-war science fiction tokusatsu films in Japan; The Rainbow Man and The Invisible Man Appears in 1949. Eiji Tsuburaya, who had repeatedly associated with Masaichi Nagata since the early 1930s, (Note: In 1930, Masaichi Nagata from Nikkatsu suggested Eiji Tsuburaya and Minoru Inuzuka from Shochiku to Nikkatsu. However, they eventually quit Nikkatsu due to various troubles. In 1948, Nagata from Daiei Film again approached Tsuburaya, who was exiled from Toho due to the purge. and suggested that if it goes well, Tsuburaya will be able to join Daiei Film.) and Sadamasa Arikawa and Shuzaburo Araki participated in these and other Daiei productions before the signing of the Six-Company Agreement in 1953 (which was also led by Masaichi), (Note: Tsuburaya's other Daiei careers include Kakute kamikaze wa fuku in 1944, Ikeru Isu in 1945, Ghost Train in 1949, and so on.) and they intended to join Daiei Film with the 1949 films after Tsuburaya's exile from Toho because of the 1948 purge due to his involvements in war propaganda, and Arikawa and Araki's voluntary resignations after Toho strikes. However, Tsuburaya was rather dissatisfied with the tokusatsu production (or effects) in The Invisible Man Appears (or their attempts to join the company didn't materialize), and eventually didn't join Daiei Film. The three later participated in Godzilla and various other Toho tokusatsu productions. The 2020 biopic Nezura 1964 ambiguously portrayed Tsuburaya's association with Daiei Film before Gamera. Additionally, various members among Tsuburaya's coworkers and students from Godzilla and other productions later participated in Gamera and Daimajin and other Daiei productions.

- Akin to Tsuburaya, Masaichi Nagata was also purged for a brief period; all domestic film production companies including Dai Nippon Film and Toho and Nikkatsu (Nagata was once a Nikkatsu employee) were forced to produce war propaganda films due to the commands from the Imperial Japanese Armed Forces. These propaganda films eventually became the starting point of the post-war tokusatsu genre (and Daiei Film's war movies), and Nagata with his Daiei Film had played significant roles in the expansion and exporting of the tokusatsu genre which itself ignited the prosperity of the post-war popular cultures in Japan. As aforementioned, Nagata's decision along with Noriaki Yuasa's view towards war and political propagandas and nationalisms were one of factors shaped the process to make Gamera becoming a friendly and heroic figure.

Daiei Film, along with its own productions of various tokusatsu films, including Gamera-related Warning from Space (1956) and the first Daiei kaiju film The Whale God (1962), also distributed the re-released edition of King Kong in 1952, making it the first post-war release of monster movies in Japan, and also distributed The Beast from 20,000 Fathoms in Japan in 1954, and these presumably influenced the productions of the 1954 film Godzilla by Toho and Daiei Film's own tokusatsu productions including the Gamera franchise. (Note: The term "appear" (現わる, arawaru) were repeatedly used by Daiei Film at that time, for the Japanese title of The Beast from 20,000 Fathoms and aforementioned The Invisible Man Appears and Warning from Space, Shinji Higuchi's Giant God Warrior Appears in Tokyo which had a slight connections with the Heisei Gamera trilogy in its production, and the aforementioned Giant Monsters Appear in Tokyo.)

Due to the Six-Company Agreement, other companies, including Masaichi's Daiei Film itself, could not "openly" use tokusatsu techniques and staffs and actors of Toho. However, according to Keizō Murase, Eiji Tsuburaya's teams were secretly appointed for Gappa: The Triphibian Monster by Nikkatsu and The X from Outer Space by Shochiku, (Note: Eiji Tsuburaya and Minoru Inuzuka once joined Nikkatsu due to the invitation from Masaichi Nagata, when they were in Shochiku. These two films also received financial assistances thanks to Masaichi Nagata's efforts.) and other subsequent productions, and Toho's techniques were secretly used in these films. For Gamera, the Giant Monster, some crews who had previously participated in Godzilla and other Toho kaiju films (Note: Such as Keizō Murase, Masao Yagi and his father Kanju, Fuminori Ohashi, Toru Suzuki, and Michio Mikami.) joined its production despite the agreement, and Eiji Tsuburaya gave a tacit approval to their actions. However, while there had been suggestions to seek Tsuburaya's help, even by an executive who is a friend of the father of Yonejiro Saito and Tsuburaya, filmmakers intentionally avoided receiving any technological assistances from Tsuburaya for the Gamera franchise to differentiate their productions from Toho, and produced Gamera and other tokusatsu films without Toho-based techniques, choices of materials, direction, and so on.

Successes of Gamera, the Giant Monster and Gamera vs. Barugon resulted in sudden increases of non-Toho kaiju productions, such as afroementioned Gappa: The Triphibian Monster and The X from Outer Space. Film makers were suspicious of Tsuburaya's involvements to these non-Daiei productions (Note: Aside from Tsuburaya, Fuminori Ohashi, who has participated in various Daiei Film tokusatsu productions, and Shinichi Sekizawa participated in Giant Phantom Monster Agon by Nippon Television, and Toho withdrew a complaint against the tv series regarding close resemblances of Godzilla and Agon the titular monster, due to the involvements of the two. Agon was presumably a reused idea of the kaiju Aron from Ambassador Magma by Ohashi himself; these two productions involved Sekizawa and Ohashi and Tomio Sagisu and others, who had direct and indirect connections with Gamera and Daimajin and The Whale God and other Daiei Film productions.) despite the Six-Company Agreement because of sudden increases in non-Toho kaiju productions after Gamera films, despite the only non-Toho tokusatsu film of that time before the 1965 Gamera film to feature gigantic creature was Daiei Film's The Whale God (Killer Whale) in 1962.

Showa Gamera films, especially since Gamera vs. Gyaos, were intended to appeal to children. This was to deal with budgetary problems and the Six-Company Agreement to differentiate from the Godzilla franchise. Due to the agreement and the direction to differentiate from Toho, Gamera's characteristics such as to breathe traditional non-atomic fire, occasional quadrupedalism along with his foes and brutal and animalistic fight scenes, (Note: Showa Gamera films intentionally featured quadruped antagonists; Barugon, Guiron, and Jiger. Noriaki Yuasa also prioritized these aspects so as not to personify monsters easily.) his personality as both a friendly creature and a hero rather than Godzilla's theme to represent a "god of destruction". Material choices for suits and miniature models were devised to avoid duplicates with the Toho productions. Plots of Showa Gamera films intentionally avoided to focus on "standards" of kaiju films by Toho, such as the JSDF and other military forces, weapons, scientific explanations, destructions of urban areas, and so on. Instead, subsequent films since Gamera vs. Viras featured simple, childish, and eccentric plots for young audiences. In the Showa films, children play significant roles with the eccentric ideas presented, and children, unlike adults, always believe in Gamera, partially due to Noriaki Yuasa's antithesis against war and political propaganda and nationalism. This direction was initially decided because a number of children watching Gamera vs. Barugon (Note: The only Showa Gamera film being not directed by Noriaki Yuasa, and the only Showa film not specifically involving children.) got bored with the plot and left their seats, and also to deal with drastically decreased budgets due to the financial situation of Daiei Film; the budget of Gamera vs. Viras was ¥24 million compared to budgets of Gamera vs. Barugon (¥80 million) and Gamera vs. Gyaos (¥60 million), with limitations of further elements such as designs and abilities of monsters, amounts of special effects, destructions of urban areas, a recurred scenario to have Gamera being incapacitated, cancellations of new monsters and battle scenes, limited locations, and so on.

A number of new tokusatsu expertise were obtained through productions of Showa Gamera films to compensate for lack of resources and avoiding Toho-based techniques and materials, however those were lost due to the bankruptcy of the company. The production of the Heisei trilogy relied on expertise from various other tokusatsu productions, especially Tsuburaya Production's Ultraman franchise, while Ultraman 80 by Noriaki Yuasa himself was the most influential of those, and some of Gamera expertises were used for aforementioned Daigoro vs. Goliath (1972) and Fireman (1973) by Tsuburaya.

As below mentioned, diminished public recognition of the franchise due to repeated hiatuses in productions and limited marketing, limited productions of associated products and their revenues, and limited media attentions, along with misconceptions among new audience segments, such as Gamera being a cheap, "corny", and inferior imitation of Godzilla and Gamera belonging to the Toho franchise, might have negatively affected box office results of the post-Daiei productions by Tokuma Shoten and Kadokawa Corporation. Additionally, negative reactions by global audiences towards the franchise in comparison to the Toho franchise were also presumably influenced by the Mystery Science Theater 3000.

Shusuke Kaneko, and Shinji Higuchi (who have previously participated in The Return of Godzilla) respectively directed GMK and Shin Godzilla where Kaneko and Kazunori Ito originally wanted to take the 1992 film Godzilla vs. Mothra (the relationship between Mothra and Shobijin might have influenced the depictions of Gamera and Asagi Kusanagi in the Heisei Gamera trilogy), however Kaneko and Ito and Higuchi's preferences of Godzilla and other Toho productions, along with their disfavor of Gamera (Showa Gamera) and dissatisfactions for the Heisei Godzilla continuity resulted in controversial outcomes of the Heisei trilogy, while Kaneko had expressed his concern and unpleasantness towards tokusatsu fans who criticize the Godzilla continuity in comparison to the Heisei Gamera trilogy.

=== Distributions and releases ===
One of factors restricted revenues from Daiei Film productions was its weak distribution systems including limited theater chains, and theatrical releases of Daiei productions relied on movie theatres by other rivaling studios, including Toho, Shochiku, (Note: Masaichi Nagata was once a Shochiku employee, and Eiji Tsuburaya and Minoru Inuzuka temporarily joined Shochiku because of Nagata. Gamera the Brave was distributed by Shochiku in 2006.) and Toei Company.

Ever since the last Daiei Film installment Gamera vs. Zigra was distributed by Dainichi Eihai for financial reasons, Daiei productions by Tokuma Shoten and Kadokawa Corporation have always relied on other companies to distribute, further restricting their productions and revenues. The Heisei trilogy was distributed by Toho as Daiei Film lost its theater chains after its bankruptcy. However, the trilogy was distributed by Toho Western Films unlike Godzilla films, and the number of movie theatres for the trilogy was much smaller than Godzilla films (presumably to avoid the competitions with the eisei Godzilla continuity which was supposed to end with Godzilla vs. Mechagodzilla II), further reducing potential box office results. However, Shōgo Tomiyama noted that he did not perceive the Gamera franchise as a rival, but was instead happy to see its revival along with the Godzilla franchise which was the sole support the kaiju genre received for years. Filming of Gamera: Guardian of the Universe was also affected by the 1994 film Godzilla vs. SpaceGodzilla as both films were filmed in Fukuoka.

Global distributions of videos of the franchise was also affected by the Godzilla franchise. For financial reasons, Daiei avoided the market in the United States and instead focused more on European countries to decrease competition with Toho productions. Foreign cast members became increasingly well-represented due to requests from European buyers; however, these buyers also requested to avoid hiring black cast members. Daiei Film obliged, though some criticized Daiei Film for this decision. Additionally, unlike for the Godzilla franchise, the buyers for Gamera were rather obscure, and stakeholders including Yuasa were not aware of the actual situation of European distributions. On the other hand, its increasingly childish direction along with involving foreign cast members were also prompted by the Japanese Film Export Promotion Association under the Japanese government where Daiei Film's Masaichi Nagata contributed in its establishment, and governmental policy to export tokusatsu films to the global market also boosted serializations of Gamera and Daimajin franchises. Gamera franchise's child-friendly directions, limited productions, and much smaller global expansions than the Godzilla franchise, presumably restricted public recognition of the Daiei franchise and established inferior public impressions on it globally to the Toho productions.

After the bankruptcy of Daiei Film, the franchise increased its efforts avoid direct competition against the Godzilla franchise, including the Heisei trilogy, and Gamera: Super Monster by Tokuma Shoten and Gamera the Brave by Kadokawa were released in 1980 and 2006 respectively because Toho temporary ceased producing Godzilla films due to declined box office results. While the franchise was not rebooted after the 1980 film, there also existed scrapped projects in early 1990s prior to the Heisei trilogy (Note: A V-cinema project in 1991, and Niisan Takahashi's script which was later redeveloped as the 1995 novel Gamera vs. Phoenix.), where the Heisei Godzilla continuity had been continuously developed since Godzilla vs. Biollante (1989). After the commercial failure of the 2006 film, which was originally launched as a proposal for a crossover with Godzilla in 2002, Kadokawa cancelled various projects, including its sequels, anime production(s), Gamera 3D, and reboot attempts in the 2010s, and instead released a short film for the 50th anniversary of the franchise in 2015; MonsterVerse by Legendary Pictures (which was at one point a Gamera project Gamera 3D) began in 2014, and subsequent Godzilla productions were continuously developed among theatrical releases and streaming media. Shin Godzilla and the anime Godzilla trilogy were directed by filmmakers who have either previously or subsequently participated in Gamera productions. Gamera Rebirth was released on Netflix in 2023 after Godzilla Singular Point in 2021.

- The Heisei Godzilla continuity was originally scheduled to end with Godzilla vs. Mechagodzilla II in 1993, corresponding with the timing of launch of Gamera: Guardian of the Universe. The Godzilla continuity was further continued up to Godzilla vs. Destoroyah (1995) due to the postponement of the American film by TriStar Pictures. Additionally, box office results of Gamera: Super Monster, Gamera 3: Revenge of Iris, and Gamera the Brave might have also been negatively affected by the timings of their releases, so-called "winters" of the kaiju genre when the popularity of kaiju genre itself stagnated so as the Godzilla franchise.

=== Participants ===
While Eiji Tsuburaya and Sadamasa Arikawa and Shuzaburo Araki eventually didn't join Daiei Film, a number of Tsuburaya's coworkers and students, who had previously participated in Godzilla and various other Toho productions, participated in Gamera and Daimajin and other Daiei productions, and a number of staffs involved in Gamera productions later participated in various Godzilla and Ultraman productions, including Gamera the Brave and Ultraman Tiga (and Digimon Tamers) reusing the same early script for Gamera: Guardian of the Universe.

A number of crews and filmmakers, (Note: Such as Noriaki Yuasa, Shusuke Kaneko, Shinji Higuchi, Hiroyuki Seshita, Keizō Murase, Akira Ifukube, Shunsuke Kikuchi, Fuminori Ohashi, Ryosaku Takayama, Toshio Miike, Michio Mikami, Toru Suzuki, Makoto Kamiya, Eizo Kaimai, Toru Matoba, Yoshiyuki Kuroda, Tomoo Haraguchi and other crews from the Heisei Gamera trilogy, Isao Kaneko, Shinichi Wakasa, Yuji Tsuzuki, Sadao Iizuka, Ex Productions, Monster's, Nippon Eizo Creative, HIRUMA MODEL CRAFT Production, Stealthworks, and so on. Additionally, Yonesaburo Tsukiji and Yoshio Watanabe were also Eiji Tsuburaya's students.) actors, voice actors, extras, and suit actors (Note: Such as Eizo Kaimai, Hurricane Ryu, Teruo Aragaki, Umenosuke Izumi, Hirofumi Fukuzawa, Toshinori Sasaki, Tomohiko Akiyama, Masaki Onishi, Mizuho Yoshida, Toru Kawai, and Akira Ohashi.) have participated in both and related franchises (including other Tsuburaya works). Keizō Murase, Masao Yagi and his father Kanju (Note: Kanju and his brother Yasuei participated in various Godzilla and Mothra films. Masao sought assistances from Kanju to make Gamera's suit for Gamera, the Giant Monster, however Kanju declined the plea due to the restraints from the Six-Company Agreement. In response to this, Kanju requested Keizō Murase to help his son, and Kanju and Murase assisted Masao at Masao's house, after their works at Toho. Masao's sons Tsutomu and Hiroshi have also joined the Ex Productions and participated in Gamera and Godzilla productions.) and Toru Suzuki and Michio Mikami, who have previously participated in Godzilla and other Toho kaiju films and worked with Eiji Tsuburaya, and Akira Takahashi and Nori Maezawa founded the tokusatsu modelling company the Ex Productions after Gamera, the Giant Monster. Murase also founded another company 20Twenty afterward. (Note: Keizō Murase's sons Fumitsugu and Naoto have also participated in the 20Twenty, and Fumitsugu later founded another tokusatsu company named Frees.) These companies contributed in various tokusatsu productions including Gamera and Daimajin, and non-Daiei franchises by Tsuburaya such as Godzilla and its related Zone Fighter, Ultraman, Kamen Rider, (Note: There exist several crossovers between Ultraman and Kamen Rider(jp)(jp), including a puppet show which involved Gamera.) and so on.

=== P Productions ===
As aforementioned, there have been contradicting theories regards the original conceptor of Gamera where even Noriaki Yuasa and Niisan Takahashi and Yonejiro Saito weren't truly aware of. Tomio Sagisu, the founder of P Productions, had repeatedly participated in Daiei Film productions most notably The Whale God and Buddha. Sagisu claimed that his 1962 demo reel (Note: About "a giant, monstrous turtle which flies by emitting flames from its retracted limbs".) for the project STOP Series, could be the original idea of Daiei's Gamera. Sagisu initially showed the demo reel to his teacher Eiji Tsuburaya, who had repeatedly associated with Masaichi Nagata and Daiei Film before Gamera. In response to this, Toho paid attention to Sagisu's idea, and the company later brought the project to Fuji Television, however STOP Series was eventually cancelled. Later, Sagisu instead brought the reel to Daiei Film to launch a project, and believed that this eventually became the prototype of Gamera. Sagisu once inquired Yonesaburo Tsukiji, another student of Tsuburaya and participated in both Nezura and Gamera, however Tsukiji didn't agree with Sagisu's claim and instead noted Hidemasa Nagata as the inventor.

There is also a testimony about the development of Gamera by the designer Akira Inoue, which might not entirely correspond with Sagisu's claim; Inoue designed over 50 different designs of Gamera for the 1965 film, including drastically different ones from the final version, such as a limb-less monster to crawl on the ground like a centipede.

Despite this, P Productions and Daiei Film retained a tie and shared various crews from productions including the Gamera franchise (Note: Such as Noriaki Yuasa, Niisan Takahashi, Shunsuke Kikuchi, Tomoo Haraguchi, Nippon Eizo Creative, HIRUMA MODEL CRAFT Production, Fuminori Ohashi, Ryosaku Takayama, Yoshio Watanabe, Eizo Kaimai, Toru Matoba, Tamotsu Taga, and so on.) where Eiji Tsuburaya's co-woker and student from Daiei Film (Ryosaku Takayama and Yoshio Watanabe) were two of founders of P Productions. Additionally, Shinsuke Kojima and Tamotsu Taga and others abandoned Daiei Film, which was already at the brink of bankruptcy and was in a chaotic state, and joined P Production after the failure and the aftermaths of Nezura. These troubles were caused by using live rats (akin to Dagora which used a live octopus) presumably due to the restraints from the Six-Company Agreement led by Masaichi Nagata himself; as aforementioned, Daiei Film used live animals for these pre-Gamera projects, presumably to avoid Toho-based styles and techniques to deal with the inter-company agreement, forcing them to change the direction to the more traditional, suit-acting character (Gamera).

Thanks to the success of the Gamera franchise, which was the successor of Dagora and Nezura, Daiei Film's fiscal condition was temporary improved, and the turtle kaiju solely supported the company and its subcontractors. Crews of Gamera and other Daiei productions, even including Noriaki Yuasa and Niisan Takahashi and Shunsuke Kikuchi and Toru Matoba, later participated in projects by P Productions (Note: Such as Denjin Zaborger, Kaiju ouji, Ambassador Magma, Spectreman, and so on.) since before the 1968 incidents on P Productions, and increased their involvements afterward where P Productions was no longer able to produce tokusatsu productions by itself and was forced to make its staffs as contract employees, (Note: In 1968, P Productions was forced to sell its main studio due to a labor dispute, and its entire office building was lost because of an accidental fire. Afterward, the company focused on subcontract tokusatsu productions by other companies.) and crews from P Productions projects later joined Gamera films.

The Daiei-based P Productions founders, Ryosaku Takayama and Yoshio Watanabe, continuously worked for both Daiei Film and P Productions including Gamera, Daimajin, Yokai Monsters, and Sagisu-related productions such as The Whale God and Buddha. Additionally, aforementioned former Daiei Film crews, who once abandoned the near-bankrupt and disoriented Daiei Film for P Productions because of Nezura, later participated in Gamera and other Daiei productions. For instance, Tamotsu Taga, along with Noriaki Yuasa and other Gamera staffs and crews from P Productions such as Shigeru Shinohara and Hirochika Muraishi, co-participated in projects such as ones by Daiei TV-Film (jp), (Note: Such as The Fiend with Twenty Faces (jp) and GO!GO Skyer (jp) and White Fang (jp).) and Gamera: Super Monster after the bankruptcy of Daiei Film.

Shirō Sagisu, the son of Tomio and the current owner of the company, has also participated in several Daiei TV-Film dramas after the bankruptcy of Daiei Film, (Note: Such as Aoi Hitomi no Sei Life (jp) and Tears of Swan (jp).) and Shirō, Hideaki Anno, (Note: He has directed the GAMERA 1999 and below-mentioned Shiki-Jitsu, and Gamera appeared in Daicon III and IV Opening Animations.) and Shinji Higuchi co-participated in Toho and Tsuburaya Production projects, which have been influenced by the Gamera franchise; Shin Godzilla, Shin Ultraman, Attack on Titan, the Neon Genesis Evangelion franchise, and the Gridman franchise. Shirō also introduced Higuchi to the pianist Junko Miyagi (jp) during the production of Evangelion: 3.0 You Can (Not) Redo because Miyagi is also a fan of the Heisei Gamera trilogy.

== History ==
The Gamera film series is broken into three different eras, each reflecting a characteristic style and corresponding to the same eras used to classify all kaiju eiga (monster movies) in Japan. The names of the three eras refer to the Japanese emperor during production: the Shōwa era, the Heisei era, and the Reiwa era.

Since original 1965 film production and merchandising budgets of each film have been confined due to financial situations of Daiei Film, Tokuma Shoten, and Kadokawa Corporation respectively, resulting in repeated copyright transfers of Daiei properties and limited productions and distributions overall, including cancellations of various projects and failed global expansions despite frequently featuring foreign casts in Shōwa films and Nagata's own contributions to the prosperity of the genre by its export. Because of further declining public recognition of the character due to years of inactivity of the franchise and limited advertising expenses and media attentions, Gamera's heroic concept and irrelevance from Godzilla franchise were "forgotten", and new audience segments often viewed him as a mere, "corny" (as a turtle) and "childish" imitation of Godzilla. (Note: In comparison to Godzilla and other Toho monsters, Gamera's motif itself (turtle) was often viewed "corny" by a number of new audience segments including children, and this tendency didn't help the recovery of the franchise.) This, along with other factors such as the loss of Daiei theater chains, has negatively affected on box office results and made it more difficult for Tokuma Shoten and Kadokawa Corporation to restore the series along with other Daiei tokusatsu franchises such as Daimajin and Yokai Monsters, especially the Daimajin which requires more budgets due to life-sized props.

There have been several major hiatus in productions: one between Gamera vs. Zigra in 1971 and Gamera: Super Monster in 1980, followed by Gamera: Guardian of the Universe in 1995, Gamera 3: Revenge of Iris in 1999 followed by Gamera the Brave in 2006 and Gamera Rebirth in 2023.

The Daimajin, another iconic tokusatsu character by Daiei Film, was originally designed to be an antagonist for the second film, and its concept was fed back into both Daimajin and Barugon, the foe in the 1966 film Gamera vs. Barugon, and Daimon the vampire was instead yielded through Daimajin. Gamera vs. Barugon was also an exception among the Showa films; not being directed by Noriaki Yuasa while it was the only installment to appoint his father Hikaru Hoshi, didn't involve child actors, and didn't target child audiences. After the success of the first film, it became the first colored and the most expensive Showa installment, yet its plot made young audiences got bored and shaped the subsequent direction of the franchise.

Daiei's yōkai films most notably the Yokai Monsters were also launched due to the success of the Gamera franchise, and productions of them and related later films such as Sakuya: Yôkaiden were largely influenced by Gamera and Daimajin series. Collaborations of the Daiei films with Shigeru Mizuki and Kazuo Umezu started because of Daiei's yōkai films and formed the "Yōkai Boom" together, resulted in minor crossovers between Gamera and Daimajin and Shigeru Mizuki's GeGeGe no Kitarō series and Hiroshi Aramata's Yasunori Katō from Teito Monogatari.

Daiei Film, which was already at the brink of bankruptcy, somewhat recovered due to the unexpected success of the 1965 film, which was considered to be "a mere rehash of Godzilla", "cheap" (Note: The Whale God and Gamera, the Giant Monster were black-and-white films due to budgetary problems; the 1956 film Warning from Space, which bears connections with Noriaki Yuasa and the Gamera franchise, was the first colored tokusatsu film in Japan.), "being forced on Noriaki Yuasa as no one wanted" (Note: Other filmmakers concerned Gamera to damage their careers, and some indeed regarded the 1965 Gamera film to spoil Yuasa's career.) (Note: Yuasa was the youngest employee director of Daiei Film at that time, and he was in need to make up for the commercial failure of his debut film If You're Happy, Clap Your Hands (1964). While other Daiei Film productions such as Daimajin and Zatoichi and Nemuri Kyōshirō were produced under the policy to interchange directors in rotations, the Gamera franchise was done by Yuasa and Niisan Takahashi. Yuasa was also driven to associate with the tokusatsu genre after resignations of experienced crews such as aforementioned Yonesaburo Tsukiji, and Toru Matoba's transfer to Tsuburaya Productions. This was also accelerated as employee directors of the company were required to promote notable actors and new actresses, and tokusatsu productions especially Gamera and Daimajin were considered useful for this purpose, while Kojiro Hongo initially didn't favor to participate in tokusatsu films and tried to avoid doing so.), and "destined to flop", (Note: General pre-release interviews were rather negative among Daiei staffs, and even Noriaki Yuasa believed it would fail since the beginning. However, Masaichi Nagata, unlike others, complimented the film, and his dictatorial authority made others to follow him against their wills, and Yuasa was indeed confused with the success of the film.) and launched the Daimajin and the Yokai Monsters, and these tokusatsu franchises gained popularity despite limited and continuously decreasing budgets and the declines of the First Kaiju Boom and domestic film industries (partially due to the success of the Gamera franchise) (Note: Depletions of budgets and ideas were inescapable after all major film companies committed in the kaiju genre both on films and television programs in response to the successes of Gamera and Godzilla and Ultraman and Ultra Q. The tokusatsu genre also contributed in the popularity of the television industries and the decline of domestic film industries, and Masaichi Nagata devoted in the establishment of the aforementioned Japanese Film Export Promotion Association to support the film industries.) and the arise of the more affordable "Yokai Boom". Serializations of Gamera and Daimajin franchises were also promoted as the Japanese government valued exportations of tokusatsu productions (because of influences from Nagata) to the global markets to acquire foreign currencies. Gamera vs. Viras was originally considered as the last Showa production, however the franchise was further continued in response to its popularity.

There had been several failed attempts to reboot the franchise since the 1970s, and the Heisei trilogy originally started as an attempt to revive either (or both of) the Daimajin and the Yokai Monsters by Tokuma Shoten, however the projects faced budgetary problems, and surveys revealed higher popularity of Gamera instead, while Tokuma Shoten and Kadokawa Corporation also aimed to revive the Daimajin along with the Gamera franchise respectively; (Note: According to Takashi Miike, Daimajin is more difficult to revive due to his size; unlike gigantic kaiju and Ultraman, Daimajin is designed to directly interact with humans, therefore requiring expensive, large-scaled, life-sized models and props.) one in the late 1990s along with the Heisei Gamera Trilogy by starring Steven Seagal, the father of Ayako Fujitani who played Asagi Kusanagi, the human protagonist of the trilogy, (Note: The script was written by Yasutaka Tsutsui and Katsuhiro Otomo, and was later published as a novelization. Several clips from Gamera: Guardian of the Universe, including scenes with Ayako Fujitani, were inserted in the 2005 film Into the Sun.) and another by Takashi Miike in late 2000s along with Gamera the Brave which was eventually cancelled and was redeveloped into Daimajin Kanon, (Note: Daimajin Kanon was originally intended to be directed by Noriaki Yuasa and Mamoru Sasaki; the two had previously co-participated in Princess Comet and Okusama wa 18-sai in Daiei Film, and were also appointed for a cancelled television series of Daimajin in the 1960s.) and Miike made the Daimajin to appear in the 2018 film The Great Yokai War: Guardians where Gamera also made a cameo appearance within its spin-off novelization.

=== Daiei Film's decay ===
Despite Daiei and its president Masaichi Nagata's achievements in the golden era of the Japanese cinema, at the time when Gamera, the Giant Monster was released, the entire domestic cinema was already significantly declining, so as Daiei's economic clout itself. The original Gamera film and Daiei Film's first kaiju production The Whale God (1962) were forced to be produced as black-and-white films for budgetary constraints, despite having Warning from Space in 1956.

These resulted in major weaknesses of the company and stagnations of its productions, such as its weak distribution systems. On the other hand, the Japanese film industry itself (even including the Godzilla franchise) was declining in general. This was mostly due to the competition against the television industry, which was boosted by several factors such as the aforementioned "Kaiju Booms" (jp)(jp) itself ironically (especially Ultra Q and Ultraman franchises by below-mentioned Eiji Tsuburaya himself and other figures related to Gamera and Godzilla and related productions), (Note: For example, Toru Matoba left Daiei Film after the Gamera-related Warning from Space and joined Tsuburaya Productions, and participated in these franchises, and transfers of veterans shaped the production structure of the Gamera franchise by Noriaki Yuasa and Niisan Takahashi.) the 1964 Summer Olympics, and an economic stagnation of the nation. Additionally, Nagata's intention to explore monster films, and his attempt to save the film industry resulted in expansions of "kaiju" and "tokusatsu" genres, however this also contributed in the launching of the "Kaiju Booms" which ironically supported the television industry. As a background of these social phenomena (booms), a governmental association was established as the result of Nagata's efforts for the sake of the film industry, and the Japanese government encouraged and supported productions of kaiju and tokusatsu works to export to the global markets to obtain foreign currencies.

However, while Daiei and Toho were leading the genres (kaiju and tokusatsu), increased competitions, and depletions of ideas and resources were inevitable because of abrupt entries of other major film studios into the genres, and the two "Kaiju Booms" including the Godzilla series didn't last long also due to the shortage of ideas, repercussions from receiving tax-based funds from the association (this resulted in the arise of the aforementioned, more cost-effective "Yokai Boom"), and additional factors such as declines of the nation's economy and the film industry, 1970s energy crisis, and so on. Gamera and Daimajin didn't play major roles for the Second Kaiju Boom, as the company faced the bankruptcy shortly after Gamera vs. Zigra in 1971, at the beginning of the boom.

There had been additional factors that damaged Daiei Film back then, such as its excessively rushed tokusatsu productions, resignations of experienced staffs (this also influenced productions of subsequent films especially the Gamera franchise), losing leading stars particularly Nagata's son-in-law Ichikawa Raizō VIII (Note: The 2023 Netflix series Gamera Rebirth cited the 1962 film Destiny's Son, which was produced by Masaichi and Raizō starred the protagonist, for the title of the episode 4.) from a colorectal cancer, and so on. Furthermore, the aforementioned Six-Company Agreement (Five-Company Agreement) led by Nagata himself presumably affected the productions of Dagora and Nezura to avoid Toho-based tokusatsu techniques, and the latter caused further resignations of employees due to serious hygiene and health and animal welfare issues. The agreement also restrained careers of various actors and actresses, and Taro Marui eventually committed a suicide six months after his appearance in Gamera vs. Gyaos.

- With the two studios in Tokyo and Kyoto, Daiei simultaneously producing successful tokusatsu films especially Gamera, Daimajin, and Yokai Monsters, and even exceeded the Toho - Tsuburaya Productions cooperation in production rates. On the other hand, Daiei requested Noriaki Yuasa to produce two or three Gamera films annually following the release of Gamera vs. Guiron, however Yuasa immediately turned down the idea due to insufficient budgets evidently afflicting the film productions. In comparison, releases of three Daimajin films within the same year (1966) consequently damaged the company and hindered the franchise.

In 1971, Daiei Film was disintegrated on 27 November (which later became "Gamera Day"), about four months after the release of Gamera vs. Zigra. The company was officially declared bankrupt on 21 December, where Akira Kurosawa, who had participated in Daiei productions such as the aforementioned Rashomon, attempted a suicide on the following day. Other notable suicide victims include Jirō Tamiya, Shirō Ōtsuji, and Tarō Yuge. Mari Atsumi, who debuted in Gamera vs. Viras, retired from acting and attempted a suicide in 1978, due to her career being tossed around because of the financial situation of Daiei.

According to Noriaki Yuasa, Daiei Film "borrowed more money" from Niisan Takahashi than anyone else, but the company eventually couldn't reimburse to him, and Takahashi also didn't receive some of his wages due to his nonparticipation in the Writers Guild of Japan. After the company's bankruptcy, Takahashi visited Masaichi Nagata and received all rights to Gamera. However, Tokuma Shoten didn't inform the production of the 1995 film Gamera: Guardian of the Universe to Takahashi, and the company reneged the agreement between Takahashi and Nagata regards the rights to Gamera, declaring that the company is independent from Daiei Film and thus doesn't accept Nagata's treaty. Takahashi was highly dissatisfied with this decision, and he severed ties with all stakeholders, damaging the friendship with Yuasa in the aftermath. Takahashi independently developed a script to produce a new film, which later became the basis of the novel Gamera vs. Phoenix (1995).

The Gamera franchise solely supported Daiei Film and its subcontractors until 1971. However, when the bankruptcy was officially announced, various important materials and equipments were destroyed through a riot by either Noriaki Yuasa himself or others. This has resulted in the poor production of Gamera: Super Monster (1980), the first installment by Tokuma Shoten released during a stagnation of the genre, and limited amounts of publications and exhibitions afterward. The demise of the company also triggered confusions and losses of negative prints and other materials, resulting in changes in the running time of Gamera vs. Viras for video and DVD releases.

All villainous monsters since Gamera vs. Viras (Viras, Guiron, Jiger, Zigra) received their names from public submissions, and this was to draw public attention to compensate for limited advertising expenses. Concepts for monsters' designs and abilities were also restricted due to budgets, (Note: Kaiju were designed to reduce staffs for practical effect unlike some of Toho kaiju such as King Ghidorah. Offensive abilities of kaiju, such as electricity and gravity and levitation and acidic mucus of Viras were scrapped. Gamera's spinning jet was originally aimed to rotate at high speed akin to the Heisei trilogy, however this was not achievable due to the lack of computers, and his non-spinning flight style was instead invented to reduce filming costs.) cancellations of new monsters, (Note: For example, a mammalian kaiju "Monga" was originally developed for Gamera vs. Guiron, however it was eventually scrapped and was replaced by Space Gyaos due to budgetary problems.) decreased destructions of urban areas, and film crews focused more on brutal melee fights to compensate for limited amounts of special effects, although the franchise occasionally received global compliments for its brutalness, such as Guiron beheading a Space Gyaos in Gamera vs. Guiron. In the 1992 Gamera-themed television special, its presenter commented as "Gamera was not enduring his enemies but budgets".

The plot of Gamera vs. Zigra, the last film of the Showa continuity, was particularly poor in consistency and logics due to the confusion of the company prior to its bankruptcy. Since the previous film Gamera vs. Jiger (1970), Noriaki Yuasa was forced to become a contract director without overtime pay, impoverishments of employees and resources became evident, and production systems were disrupted due to increased labor negotiations. Niisan Takahashi also didn't receive some of his wages, and the company couldn't pay back debts to him. One of kaiju battles for the 1971 film was also eventually scrapped due to budgetary and schedule limitations. According to Yuasa, all staffs were stressed out for their fears of bankruptcy, and one of lighting staffs died from an intracranial hemorrhage shortly after the completion of Gamera vs. Jiger; Yuasa believed the abrupt change of the staff's health condition was due to critical psychological stress.

The Heisei trilogy had greatly affected the entire tokusatsu genre afterward, while various other tokusatsu productions significantly influenced its production to compensate for the loss of tokusatsu expertise obtained from Showa Gamera films due to the collapse of Daiei Film, especially Noriaki Yuasa himself's Ultraman 80 (1980) after his Gamera career in Daiei, along with other Ultraman and Ultra Q series, Kamen Rider, Choujyu Sentai Liveman, Gridman the Hyper Agent, Gunhed, and many others. Some of Showa Gamera expertises were instead used for Tsuburaya Production's Daigoro vs. Goliath (1972) and Fireman (1973), while the plot of the former bears similarities to the aforementioned "Konaka Gamera" script.

Revenues of Daiei Film productions were repeatedly restricted due to lack of exclusive movie theaters, and ever since Gamera vs. Zigra which was co-distributed with Nikkatsu due to the financial problems and was released several months prior to the bankrupt, the franchise has always relied on co-distributions as Daiei Film lost its theater chains after its bankruptcy; the Heisei trilogy was done so by Toho, so as Gamera the Brave by Shochiku, and Gamera Rebirth by Netflix. The Great Yokai War and The Great Yokai War: Guardians were also co-distributed by Shochiku and Toho. Heisei trilogy was distributed by Toho Western Films with much fewer theatres than Godzilla films, further declining box office results.

- The box office returns of Gamera: Guardian of the Universe, the first installation of the reboot by Tokuma Shoten in 1995, were also negatively affected by the Great Hanshin earthquake (and the Tokyo subway sarin attack for a lesser extent) as the numbers of film theaters further reduced and the scenes of destructions of buildings triggered PTSD among the earthquake victims. (Note: Some audiences left the theaters during the battle scene between Gamera and a Super Gyaos in Tokyo. Staffs from Toho also took Kaneko to some of damaged areas by the earthquake before the release of G1. On the other hand, panic scenes in G2 and G3 were inspired by the two events.)
- While the Kadokawa films once became prominent among the Japanese cinema and even changed the direction of the industry, the brand's major weakness was also the distribution system. Some time after the theatrical release of Nausicaä of the Valley of the Wind (1984), the aforementioned Yasuyoshi Tokuma supported Kadokawa by matchmaking Haruki Kadokawa and Toho (and its distributors), however the Japanese cinema was again in a period of decline, and the brand (Kadokawa films) demised with its last film, Rex: A Dinosaur's Story (1993), which influenced the production of Gamera the Brave (2006), and Hiroyuki Seshita, the later director of Gamera Rebirth, participated in it.

Financial vulnerability resulted in repeated avoidances from direct competitions against the Godzilla franchise, although there had been failed attempts to make a crossover in the 1990s and 2002, leading to the production of Gamera the Brave in 2006 due to Toho's temporal pause of Godzilla film productions since Godzilla: Final Wars while both films shared some of crews.

=== Influences of the Heisei Trilogy ===
The Heisei Trilogy by Shusuke Kaneko, despite its limited budgets less than half of Godzilla films at that time, (Note: Budgets of Gamera: Guardian of the Universe in 1995 was $4.5 million, followed by Gamera 2: Attack of Legion ($5 million) in 1996 and Gamera 3: Revenge of Iris ($7 million) in 1999. Budgets of Godzilla vs. SpaceGodzilla in 1994 and Godzilla vs. Destoroyah in 1995 were $10 million.) distributions, marketing, media attentions, and revenues, was highly acclaimed among audiences, partially because a number of hardcore kaiju (tokusatsu) fans at that time, including Kaneko and other crews themselves, were dissatisfied with the Heisei Godzilla continuity (although Kaneko instead condemned fans who unjustly treat those Godzilla films by comparing with the Gamera trilogy,) and filmmakers that they are often considered as a pinnacle of Japanese tokusasu, and was highly appreciated by critics and received various awards. (Note: The trilogy and its participants received a number of awards, and Gamera: Guardian of the Universe and Gamera 2: Attack of Legion were first kaiju films to win the Seiun Award, and the latter was the first film to win the Nihon SF Taisho Award. Gamera: Guardian of the Universe was also the first kaiju film to win the Kinema Junpo Best Ten followed by the aforementioned Shin Godzilla, while "G2" and "G3" also won the "readers' choices". "G1" was also included in "Best 100 Japanese films" by Kinema Junpo.) and it greatly influenced entire tokusatsu genre afterward, including the Godzilla franchise but most notably on Ultraman and Kamen Rider franchises. (Note: Several important tokusatsu techniques were developed during the productions of the Heisei trilogy, and these techniques have been repeatedly used in subsequent tokusatsu productions.) It was also the first tokusatsu productions to secure full cooperation from the JSDF. However, there are pros and cons regarding the outcomes of the trilogy.

- The production of the trilogy faced obsracles, such as the financial situation of Tokuma Shoten and the intercompany treaty for co-funding to grant Kaneko's demand to increase budgets, losses of Daiei theater chains and its tokusatsu expertise, and the Great Hanshin earthquake and the Tokyo subway sarin attack. Additionally, as aforementioned, the trilogy might have originally tried to avoid a direct competition against the Heisei Godzilla continuity, which was originally supposed to end with Godzilla vs. Mechagodzilla II. Distribution by Toho Western Films unlike Godzilla films potentially restricted box office results of the trilogy.

Continuation of the series after Gamera 3: Revenge of Iris was cancelled due to the overall box office results of the trilogy, partially due to diminished public recognition of the franchise and limited advertising expenses and limited distributions, and the struggle to produce sequels after depicting the titular heroic character as an unintentional threat to humanity in the 1999 film where the film plot such as a girl (child) to detest Gamera, and depictions of human casualties in the battles of Shibuya and Kyoto largely displeased Noriaki Yuasa and Niisan Takahashi and others; Yuasa criticized the trilogy and emphasized the importance to differentiate from Godzilla and had desired to revive "Showa Gamera", and the draft by Shusuke Kaneko and Kazunori Itō for "Gamera 4" to portray Gamera as a further threat was immediately turned down. According to Kazunori Ito, Daiei (Tokuma Shoten) absolutely disapproves a story beyond G3, and the concepts of the cancelled G4 was later reused for the 2003 independent film GAMERA 4-TRUTH by Shinpei Hayashiya.

Kaneko noted that he was at one point almost dismissed during the production of the 1995 film (and its production was at the brink of cancellation and was significantly delayed) due to considerable disagreements between the duo (Kaneko and Itō) against executives and Showa staffs to depict Gamera as an intimidating-looking character being both an artificial and mechanical "living robot" and a threat to humanity without caring at all for humans, not even children, partially because Kaneko and Ito originally wanted to make the 1992 film Godzilla vs. Mothra instead of Gamera, and wanted to "take revenge on with Gamera" while the two were not delighted with the offer to produce Gamera films as they and Shinji Higuchi have always preferred Toho productions since their childhoods, and disliked and regarded the concept of Gamera being rather absurd and "childish", especially his ability to fly, his heroic concept as a protector of the humanity and affinity to children, child protagonists, and being a turtle.

- Kazunori Itō described their original concept of Gamera (his design and personality) for the 1995 film was even more indifferent than in Gamera 3: Revenge of Iris; Gamera doesn't care damaging humanity like "how humans see ants", and they originally intended Gamera to emit mechanical sounds and bioluminescence, and to perform machine-like abilities such as shapeshifting and energy shield. Kaneko also questioned the logic of the gigantic monster to distinguish human children and adults, and this also shaped their depictions of Gamera.
- According to Kaneko, he had never watched Showa Gamera films in theaters in his youth, and even wondered he would be made a fool by others if he says he is interested in Gamera, and had a tendency to view Gamera fans coldly. He, as a child, had never asked his parents for pocket money to watch Gamera films as he thought it is embarrassing to watch the "lame turtle kaiju". Kaneko and Ito also revealed that they were not delighted with the offer for Gamera: Guardian of the Universe, as they actually wanted to produce Godzilla films. All of Kaneko and Ito and Highuchi didn't feel attached to Gamera and saw the franchise as childish and absurd and not rich in "property values". However, they were indeed startled by the popularity of Showa Gamera among their own film crews (and their oppositions against disrespecting Showa Gamera), who applied for the productions of the trilogy for their affinities to Showa Gamera. Kaneko and Ito and Higuchi were repeatedly troubled with this, and secretly called those film crews and employees "Secret Gamera" (隠れガメラ Kakure Gamera). Aside from their own aversions of turtle as a motif, Kaneko and Ito also thought that human characters calling Gamera a "turtle" may disrupt seriousness, where Gamera's name is directly delivered from Japanese word "kame" to represent turtles, and turtle as a motif has also negatively affected for the popularity of the character. They decided to set up an interpretation of the trilogy that either turtles and tortoises don't exist at all or went extinct along with dinosaurs, to prevent human characters to call Gamera a "turtle".

During the trilogy, Kaneko and Ito tried to exclude children completely from the plot, and also tried to depict human casualties by Gamera from the start, however executives and Showa staff didn't approve such ideas, and scenes to involve children were briefly inserted as an "excuse" to convince stakeholders although such scenes mostly depicted children to be helpless "burdens" unlike Showa films, and human casualties were not featured until Gamera 3: Revenge of Iris. The 1999 film instead situated a girl (child) named Ayana Hirasaka as one of central antagonists to detest Gamera, however she was again portrayed as a "burden" that her parents and pet cat named "Iris" were accidentally killed by Gamera because their evacuation from the battle between Gamera and a Gyaos was delayed due to Ayana's hospitalization, and she brings a mass destruction with her misdirected hatred for Gamera, and Gamera loses his right arm to save her. (Note: Gamera to sacrifice his arm for Ayana was intended as an atonement for killing her parents and Iris the cat. The idea of Gamera to lose his arm was originally inspired by the 1972 film One-Armed Boxer.) Especially the 1999 film intentionally avoided to appeal to child audiences, and the trilogy in general didn't contribute in increasing young audiences due to the difficulty of the plot, lack of points that children can empathize, and fearsome and gruesome scenes especially the destruction of Shibuya by Gamera caused family audiences to exit theaters because children started crying, while Kazunori Ito claimed that he dislikes to depict Gamera as the hero of children, and advocated that he refuses to make Gamera as a child-friendly hero, and making child audiences crying in fears is correct for kaiju films. The trilogy also triggered a misconception amongs new audience segments; Gamera as the character exclusively originates artificially, would sacrifice humans for the sake of the planet and nature, and turtles and tortoises (as normal organisms) don't exist (or went extinct) in the universes of the franchise. On the other hand, production of Gamera 3: Revenge of Iris was delayed and was intentionally designed as a horror because of box office results of 1995 and 1996 films, declined popularity of kaiju genre, and contrasting popularity of horror films among children at that time, including Ring and Ghosts at School franchises which possess indirect connections with the Gamera franchise. (Note: As aforementioned, Gamera, due to diminished public recognition, has often been viewed as a "corny" (for being a turtle) and "childish" imitation of Godzilla even among children, and the kaiju genre itself was considered childish among many children at that time, and there had been multiple other factors to restrict box office results of the Heisei trilogy. Ironically, this direction for the 1999 film instead shunned children who originally loved Gamera.) (Note: For the popularity of horror films, Ring and Ghosts at School and Honto ni Atta Kowai Hanashi series directly influenced the production of "G3"; Kaneko directed the 1997 film Ghosts at School 3 in which various staffs and actors of Heisei Gamera trilogy also participated in (Kaneko later noted that if he was not appointed for Gamera: Guardian of the Universe, he would have directed the Ghosts at School franchise since the beginning), and the Ring franchise is also a Kadokawa property where Yukie Nakama who appeared in the 1999 Gamera film (as a victim of Iris to turn into a mummy) has also played Sadako Yamamura in Ring 0: Birthday in 2000, Gamera and Daimajin and Kitarō (GeGeGe no Kitarō) and Sadako and Kayako Saeki and Toshio Saeki co-appeared in USO Makoto Yōkai Hyaku Monogatari where Iris was also directly mentioned, and the 2022 film Sadako DX by Hisashi Kimura (jp) was instead influenced by "G2" where Kimura has participated in both films, and a VHS of "G2" was briefly represented in the Sadako film. A Gamera mobile game conducted a collaboration with Sadako 3D in 2012, along with occasional joint exhibitions of sculptures of Gamera and Daimajin and Kitarō and Sadako in Chōfu, and crews such as Tomoo Haraguchi and Kenji Kawai and Nippon Eizo Creative have participated in both franchises.)

These aspects resulted in controversies, even among film crews of the Heisei trilogy, and a disapproval of the films, especially Gamera 3: Revenge of Iris, by a number of executives and Showa staffs. Additionally, Tokuma Shoten's revenues were also reduced due to the intercompany treaty with Nippon TV and Hakuhodo to achieve Kaneko's demand to increase budgets. (Note: A budget of over ¥1500 million would have needed if they faithfully adapt Kaneko's conceptions. Kaneko jokingly noted that if the budget for Gamera: Guardian of the Universe stayed at ¥500 million, he would have made it a comedy as a "25th anniversary project for Daiei's bankruptcy".) Parts of two previous films in the trilogy, such as Gamera's origin as an artificial lifeform, the depiction of Gamera doing damage to Fukuoka in the 1995 film, and the "Ultimate Plasma" technique in Gamera 2: Attack of Legion, were also controversial, but were eventually approved. The plot of Gamera 3: Revenge of Iris and Gamera's depictions within the film partially followed those original ideas by Kaneko and Itō and Shinji Higuchi, while some of the originally cancelled depictions of Gamera for the 1995 film, such as his intimidating appearance and the ability to transform his arms into flippers during flights, were partially approved in Gamera 2: Attack of Legion. As aforementioned, the 2003 independent film GAMERA 4-TRUTH partially re-used the plot of cancelled "G4" in which Gamera no longer protects humanity and causes tremendous collateral damages to exterminate remnants of Gyaos.

- Disagreement regarding the design of Gamera for the 1995 film between executives against Kaneko's side was difficult to settle, where the latter intended to use even more intimidating one than Gamera 3: Revenge of Iris. In response, the producer Tsutomu Tsuchikawa (who at one point lost his temper and declared to resign because of multiple disagreements between Daiei and Kaneko's side) requested Tomoo Haraguchi and the designing team to deal with the situation, and they "adjusted" the suit design to be "intermediate" between the two sides, because the first press conference to reveal Gamera's design was approaching. The original intimidating design of Gamera for the trilogy was changed to appeal to children in the 1995 film, however Shusuke Kaneko was also disappointed with children's subtle reactions with Gamera's 1995 design unlike Toho's Godzilla Junior. Later, Toto (Gamera) in Gamera the Brave was intentionally designed to be contrasting to the design of Gamera in the 1999 film.
- A number of executives and Showa staffs were strongly against the idea of kaiju as bioengineered weapons or "living robots" because they felt it would decline mystic aspects of kaiju, characters as creatures, and superiority as uncontrollable and powerful beings beyond humanity. However, Kaneko and Ito were dissatisfied with Gamera's illogical biology especially his flight capabilities. A number of disagreements including this resulted in Kaneko's near dismissal during the 1995 film production. On the contrary, Kaneko and Higuchi actually hesitated to use the non-biological "Ultimate Plasma" technique for "G2", however they prioritized the necessity to introduce new special attacks therefore "Ultimate Plasma" and "Vanishing Fist" were introduced respectively in "G2" and "G3".

The 1999 documentary film GAMERA 1999 by Hideaki Anno focused on ruptures among film crews, even between Kaneko and Higuchi. Kaneko described that the documentary film was a harassment by one of producers to target Kaneko by using Anno.

Ironically, the popularity of the Heisei trilogy indirectly triggered another setback for the franchise. While the box office returns of the trilogy and their revenues for Tokuma Shoten along with proceeds of merchandises targeting maniac audiences weren't particularly excellent due to aforementioned factors, the company was already struggling financially and it eventually disposed the copyrights of Daiei Film properties after the death of Yasuyoshi Tokuma in 2000. Sequels after Gamera 3: Revenge of Iris, potentially up to "G5" or more, were cancelled also due to the plot of "G3" for Gamera to act hazardous, and the plot of "G4" in which Gamera becomes a further threat.

The 2006 film Gamera the Brave, which was released shortly after the death of Noriaki Yuasa and during a "winter" of kaiju genre (akin to the situations of Gamera: Super Monster and Gamera 3: Revenge of Iris) since Godzilla: Final Wars in 2004, was the first reboot attempt by Kadokawa Corporation reusing the "Konaka Gamera" concept. Gamera the Brave aimed to restore the basis of the franchise. This decision was made despite knowing the obvious popularity of the Heisei trilogy, and financial vulnerability of Kadokawa Daiei (and risks to fail by changing the direction); Kadokawa carefully considered to expand the continuity of the trilogy, and many recommended to make either sequels, prequels, or side stories, or trilogy-esque different series. However, in response to the increasingly unbalanced and maniac direction of the trilogy which deviated from the original ideology of the franchise, and losses of stable and diverse fanbases and merchandise proceeds, correcting the course of the franchise and its survival among changing markets were more prioritized, and Shusuke Kaneko's continuity was terminated to restart with a new series.

- Additionally, Gamera the Brave also avoided criterions of kaiju films due to temporal stagnation of the kaiju genre itself particularly after Godzilla: Final Wars, positive reviews of the Heisei Mothra trilogy (Note: These Gamera and Godzilla and Mothra films shared some of crews such as Nippon Eizo Creative in productions.), and influences from other films including ones related to Gamera and Kadokawa (Daigoro vs. Goliath, Helen the Baby Fox, Rex: A Dinosaur's Story) .

However the 2006 film was generally not well-accepted by fans of the Heisei trilogy, but it was more welcomed by children and female audiences who were not specially targeted for the Heisei trilogy, resulting in the commercial failure of the film and cancellation of its sequels and other subsequent productions such as (one or two) anime(s) by Cartoon Network and Yoshitomo Yonetani, Gamera 3D by Yoshimitsu Banno, and one or more presumed reboot attempts in the 2010s, and the franchise was again in a period of inactivity until the 2023 Netflix series Gamera Rebirth. Takashi Miike's Daimajin project was presumably cancelled due to the aftermath of Gamera the Brave, while it resulted in the production of Daimajin Kanon, and Daimajin appeared in Miike's The Great Yokai War: Guardians (2021), along with Gamera in its spin-off novelization; Miike's The Great Yokai War (2005) also made brief references to Gamera.

- As aforementioned, the franchise after the bankruptcy of Daiei Film may have always tried to avoid direct competitions against Godzilla franchise, while Tokuma Shoten and Kadokawa's offers for a crossover were turned down in the 1990s and 2002. Godzilla productions have been continuously released since 2014 where Gamera 3D was one of predecessors of MonsterVerse series by Legendary Pictures.

According to Shusuke Kaneko, Kadokawa "doesn't offer" him a new production despite him having new ideas for either "G4" or a new production. Naoki Sato notified Kaneko that the franchise will be rebooted by differentiating from the trilogy and reminded him not to interfere with Gamera the Brave. Kaneko subsequently brought new ideas to Kadokawa at one point, however Gamera Rebirth was already in production. Kaneko prefers villainous characters (by comparing Gamera and Godzilla), and one of his new ideas is Gamera's attack on the Pearl Harbor.

Shusuke Kaneko, who dislikes the concepts of Gamera (Showa Gamera), is aware both of criticisms against him and the intention of Gamera the Brave (to recover the ideology of the franchise from the Heisei trilogy), however he in return openly disfavored the 2006 film and criticized its concept, describing it a commercial failure and a failed serialization, and instead advocated the superiority of his direction and the Heisei trilogy. Kaneko also believes Gamera the Brave and the aforementioned Godzilla: Final Wars were responsible for the decline of the genre afterwards. On the other hand, Kazunori Ito, who also doesn't favor Showa Gamera films but prefers Toho productions, instead suggested to free the franchise from the "curse" of the Heisei trilogy after he watched the anniversary short film in 2015.

Gamera Rebirth, being a tribute particularly to Noriaki Yuasa (and his Showa era films) and another remake of the "Konaka Gamera" plot, was produced with several policies about Gamera-human relationship, such as a reciprocal relationship between Gamera and children to protect each other, and to avoid human casualties by Gamera.

As aforementioned, artificial origins of kaiju in Gamera: Guardian of the Universe was highly controversial among Daiei (where the Showa films slightly utilized mythological concepts, and the initial ideas for Gamera's identity in the Heisei trilogy were divided mostly between a creature and a deity), and caused a misconception among audiences that the kaiju in the franchise has always been bioengineered creatures. This disagreement almost resulted in either a cancellation of the project or dismiss of Shusuke Kaneko while such setting was introduced by Kaneko and Kazunori Ito to rationalize illogical biology (flight capability) of Gamera. (Note: The idea itself was either initially developed during the original scripts by Chiaki J. Konaka and Kazuya Konaka and Yoshikazu Okada and was reused by Kaneko and Ito (in the plot, one of scientists had an impression that the biology of Gyaos evokes biomechanical rather than natural), or Kaneko and Ito instead developed by themselves. According to Kaneko, he originally intended to depict humanity to weaponize monsters in the trilogy akin to Pacific Rim.) While the lore of the trilogy itself possessed supernatural aspects and introduced souls and a ghost in a manga side story, the franchise, along with Niisan Takahashi's 1995 novel Gamera vs. Phoenix, subsequently increased supernatural depictions, including Gamera the Brave which was redeveloped from the "Konaka Gamera" script, such as mystic identities of kaiju, and to involve entities such as deities, spirits, yokai, souls, and ghosts. Within the aforementioned spinoff prequel of The Great Yokai War: Guardians, Gamera was emphasized as a divine beast based on her capabilities to fly and to breathe fire.

- Nagata's Daiei was already prominent in horror and yokai and fantasy genres prior to the Gamera franchise, and Daimajin and Yokai Monsters were launched thanks to the kaiju series. Yoshimitsu Banno's Gamera 3D also intended to introduce mythological characters most notably Sun Wukong, where the Journey to the West trilogy (jp) was among the popular Daiei tokusatsu productions before Gamera. While Gamera in Gamera Rebirth is a bioengineered weapon, Kadokawa conducted a collaboration with the sake brand Shinkame because the latter represents "turtles as the servants of deities".

Additional controversies of Gamera 2: Attack of Legion include its uneasy ending regards the relationship between Gamera and humanity, and the depictions of the JSDF which were reviewed "excessively praising"; Shusuke Kaneko described the difficulty to depict the JSDF as a war metaphor in subsequent kaiju films in the 2020s. (Note: During the production of the trilogy, Kaneko believed that "kaiju films are metaphors of wars and the JSDF was protecting the Constitution of Japan". However, the use of the Right of Collective Self-defense was adopted as of 2021, and to depict an "enjoyable Exclusively Defense", the JSDF became a metaphor of natural disasters like within Shinji Higuchi's Shin Godzilla. Kaneko instead depicted a "fictional enemy" (Legion) for G2, and a "fictional defense force" for Godzilla, Mothra and King Ghidorah: Giant Monsters All-Out Attack.)

As aforementioned, there had been a number of hardcore kaiju and tokusatsu fans with their dissatisfactions with the Heisei Godzilla series back then, including Kaneko and Ito and Higuchi and some of the crews of the trilogy, and their demands for realistic and serious kaiju productions contributed in the direction of the trilogy and its positive receptions. However, this indirectly triggered an atmosphere among inconsiderate fans to use the Gamera trilogy to deny those Godzilla films, discomforting Kaneko instead.

Additionally, Tokuma Shoten's dispute with Niisan Takahashi regarding Gamera's legal rights and the production of Gamera: Guardian of the Universe indirectly damaged relationships between Takahashi and all other Daiei and Gamera stakeholders even including Noriaki Yuasa.

=== Shōwa era (1965–1980) ===
==== Daiei film ====
The film series began in 1965 with Gamera, the Giant Monster, directed by Noriaki Yuasa, which is the first and only entry in the entire series to be shot in black-and-white due to budgetary constraints.

A total of seven Gamera films were produced between 1965 and 1971, with one being released in Japan each year, while Noriaki Yuasa rejected Daiei's request to produce two or three films annually because of deteriorated conditions with insufficient budgets. These films, several of which were also directed by Yuasa, became popular with child audiences. During this time, five of the seven films were picked up for television distribution in the United States by American International Television. Just as Gamera, the Giant Monster becoming Gammera the Invincible, each film (except for Gamera vs. Zigra) was dubbed into English and re-titled for American viewers—Gamera vs. Barugon became War of the Monsters; Gamera vs. Gyaos became Return of the Giant Monsters; Gamera vs. Viras became Destroy All Planets; Gamera vs. Guiron became Attack of the Monsters; and Gamera vs. Jiger became Gamera vs. Monster X.

Despite several sources stating that a monster called Garasharp was to appear in the eighth entry in the Gamera series slated for a 1972 release, director Noriaki Yuasa stated that Garasharp was created specifically for the short film Gamera vs. Garasharp featured on the 1991 LD set, Gamera Permanent Preservation Plan, and that a new two-headed monster was planned for the next film, which was canceled because Daiei Film went into bankruptcy in 1971 and the Gamera films ceased production as a result.

Niisan Takahashi later published a revised graphic novel of Gamera vs. Garasharp illustrated by Yutaka Kondo, known for his illustrations of kaiju and other fictional characters for the Kūsō Kagaku Dokuhon series (which has featured both Gamera and Godzilla franchises and theoretical battles between the two titular characters), and it was recorded in the 1995 CD-ROM of Gamera, the Giant Monster. This edition depicted Garasharp with a different appearance and the ability to emit electricity.

==== Tokuma Shoten ====
After Daiei was purchased by Tokuma Shoten in 1974, the new management wanted to produce another Gamera film, resulting in Gamera: Super Monster (also known as Space Monster Gamera), released in 1980. The filmmakers were forced to make the movie because of the contract for one more Gamera film that they owed to Daiei. Approximately one-third of Gamera: Super Monster is composed of stock footage from six of the previous seven films. Yuasa had Takahashi end the film by having Gamera be presumably killed by sacrificing his life to save Earth, while the later-published manga by Hurricane Ryu depicted that Gamera was artificially resurrected.

In 1985, the American distribution rights to the Gamera films were bought by producer Sandy Frank, who distributed five of the eight films with new English dubbing. In 1988 and 1989, Frank's versions of Gamera, the Giant Monster (simply re-titled Gamera), Gamera vs. Barugon, Gamera vs. Gyaos (re-titled Gamera vs. Gaos), Gamera vs. Guiron, and Gamera vs. Zigra were each used in episodes of the television program Mystery Science Theater 3000, during the show's first season, which aired on KTMA-TV.

Rebooting attempts, like a television series project in 1970s, and an intention to resurrect the franchise starting with Gamera: Super Monster (1980) didn't materialize.

=== Heisei era (1995–2015) ===
==== Tokuma Shoten ====
In the 1995 series reboot by Tokuma Shoten, Gamera: Guardian of the Universe, three Gyaos are discovered on a remote island. The Japanese government discovers that they are all female and decides that since they are the last of their kind, they should be captured and studied. Meanwhile, scientists search for a moving atoll in the Pacific. When the atoll is located, small gems made of an unknown metal are discovered on it, as well as a stone that protrudes from the center of the island. The scientists take pictures and collect some of the strange gems, but the stone crumbles and the atoll moves off towards Japan at high speeds. The atoll is found to be an ancient monster of Atlantean origin called Gamera. He attacks the Gyaos; two are killed, but one escapes. The remaining Gyaos grows to Gamera-like proportions and returns to resume the battle. Gamera defeats this foe and heads out to sea.

In Gamera 2: Attack of Legion, released in 1996, Gamera defends the Earth from attacks by an alien force known as Legion.

In Gamera 3: Revenge of Iris, released in 1999, Gamera has to face hordes of Gyaos Hyper and a new foe known as Iris which is a subspecies of Gyaos. Shusuke Kaneko originally wanted to end the film with Gamera's victory against the swarms of Gyaos, however his idea was cancelled partially due to budgetary problems.

Yasuyoshi Tokuma's proposal for a crossover with Godzilla didn't materialize, and "G4" was cancelled, and Tokuma Shoten eventually disposed Daiei Film properties due to Yasuyoshi's death in 2000 and the financial condition of the company.

The 2003 independent film, GAMERA 4-TRUTH, which presumably reused a part of the scrapped plot of "G4", was produced by Shinpei Hayashiya with featuring Yukijirō Hotaru. (Note: His teacher, Yukitarō Hotaru's appearance in Gamera vs. Gyaos was the main reason for Yukijirō's involvements in the Heisei Gamera trilogy.) Tokuma Shoten gave permission to it under the condition to not take fees, and it has been repeatedly co-screened with canonical Gamera films on occasions.

In the early 1990s, there existed attempts to produce new productions which were different from the Heisei trilogy. Prior to the actual development of the trilogy, Niisan Takahashi independently developed an idea for a new film in 1994 and sent its script to several filmmakers including Ishiro Honda, and this later became the basis of the 1995 novel Gamera vs. Phoenix; Takahashi had experienced a discord against Tokuma Shoten for the production of Gamera: Guardian of the Universe and severed ties with all stakeholders. Additionally, there was another scrapped project to produce a new V-cinema around 1991 according to Tomoo Haraguchi, where a stakeholder from Tokuma Shoten revealed to Haraguchi after the release of Mikadroid.

Prior to the production of Gamera 3: Revenge of Iris, there existed a film project "Gamera 2.5" (Note: Two subsequent Heisei-trilogy-based manga, Gamera vs. Barugon: Comic Version and Gamera Side Story: Version 2.5 (Japanese: ガメラ外伝 Ver 2.5, Hepburn: Gamera Gaiden Bājon 2.5), instead had the number "2.5" in their titles.) by Shusuke Kaneko and Kazunori Ito and others due to Shinji Higuchi's reluctance to participate in the 1999 film. Its plot never involved Gamera directly, and instead focused on a juvenile Gyaos attacking on a depopulated, mountainous village, and aged villagers resisting the monster. Higuchi eventually joined the 1999 film due to the cancellation of the project by Mamoru Oshii (Note: Oshii and various members of the Heisei Gamera trilogy, including Kaneko and Ito and Higuchi, have had connections since before the production of the Heisei trilogy. Oshii's works, such as Urusei Yatsura, which have had occasional associations with the Gamera and Daimajin franchises, and other scrapped projects, influenced the production of the Heisei trilogy, and Oshii was at one point supposed to join the trilogy.), which was the preceding project of Garm Wars: The Last Druid (2014).

==== Kadokawa Corporation ====
In Gamera the Brave, the first reboot attempt by Kadokawa Corporation released in 2006 two years after the death of Noriaki Yuasa, Gamera (Avant Gamera, later as Toto) battles a flock of Original Gyaos and Zedus, a mutant kaiju under the influence of Gyaos. It was initially intended to be either a related story of the Heisei trilogy (either a sequel or prequel or side story, or a similar production), or a crossover with Godzilla, and the company also initiated reboot attempts of Daimajin and Yokai Monsters, and the 2005 film The Great Yokai War was produced and Gamera was briefly mentioned in this film. Afterward the 2006 film, various subsequent productions including its sequels, along with a Daimajin project were cancelled, and Daimajin Kanon was instead produced, while Miike's wish to revive Daimajin was eventually granted in 2021 as The Great Yokai War: Guardians, along with the appearance of Gamera in its spinoff prequel novel.

In March 2014, Anime News Network reported that a new Gamera production was planned, with no release date specified.

At the New York Comic Con held in October 2015, Kadokawa Daiei Studio's senior managing director Tsuyoshi Kikuchi and producer Shinichiro Inoue screened a full proof-of-concept film in honor of the franchise's 50th anniversary; the short was directed by Katsuhito Ishii and its music was composed by Kenji Kawai. The proof-of-concept film featured a newly designed Gamera, a swarm of newly designed Gyaos and a new, as yet unnamed monster, all of which were created and rendered through the use of computer-generated imagery. It has been rumored since the film's showing at New York Comic Con that it was never completed. However, the film's official website and an interview with the director both state that it was only a short proof of concept film.

On the other hand, Inoue was actually trying to reboot the franchise with a new film for five years, and the director Ishii implied a potential film production. However, as a budget insufficiency prevented from producing a full-length film, no new developments followed the short film, making it the franchise's last notable movement in the Heisei era.

=== Reiwa era (2023) ===
An anime series, titled Gamera Rebirth, was released globally on Netflix in 2023. A number of references to previous films and scrapped projects were made, including the reuse of the iconic Gamera March, and the 2015 short film served as the basis for designs of Gamera and Gyaos and the scene for Gamera to shoot down a flock of smaller Gyaos with his fireball in the first episode (Katsuhito Ishii was credited as the designer of Gamera).

It yet again suffers insufficiency in budget and schedule; it features poorly done 3D models for humans, and lacks an opening animation which is a common feature of Japanese anime. The battle scenes were also cut in half or even less (20%) from what was originally intended to be, including cancellations of a number of monsters' abilities and characteristics, and the director Hiroyuki Seshita noted that inserting kaiju battles in every episode was very difficult for budgetary problems.

While crews are willing to produce additional seasons (potentially up to 5) with more budgets and increased fighting scenes, the future of the series is uncertain. Seshita also pointed a possibility of the series to be adapted into live-action productions, and expressed his wish for the series to contribute to the recovery of public recognition of the character and the revival of the franchise.

== Filmography ==
=== Films ===
| No. | Title | Year | Director(s) | Monster co-star(s) | Licenses |
Shōwa era (1965–1980)
| 1 | Gamera, the Giant Monster | 1965 | Noriaki Yuasa | None | Arrow Video |
| 2 | Gamera vs. Barugon | 1966 | Shigeo Tanaka | Barugon | Arrow Video |
| 3 | Gamera vs. Gyaos | 1967 | Noriaki Yuasa | Gyaos (jp) | Arrow Video |
| 4 | Gamera vs. Viras | 1968 | Noriaki Yuasa | Viras | Arrow Video |
| 5 | Gamera vs. Guiron | 1969 | Noriaki Yuasa | Guiron, Space Gyaos | Arrow Video |
| 6 | Gamera vs. Jiger | 1970 | Noriaki Yuasa | Jiger, Jiger's baby | Arrow Video |
| 7 | Gamera vs. Zigra | 1971 | Noriaki Yuasa | Zigra | Arrow Video |
| 8 | Gamera: Super Monster | 1980 | Noriaki Yuasa | Gyaos, Zigra, Viras, Jiger, Guiron, and Barugon | Arrow Video |
Heisei era (1995–2006)
| 9 | Gamera: Guardian of the Universe | 1995 | Shusuke Kaneko | Gyaos | Arrow Video |
| 10 | Gamera 2: Attack of Legion | 1996 | Shusuke Kaneko | Legion | Arrow Video |
| 11 | Gamera 3: Revenge of Iris | 1999 | Shusuke Kaneko | Iris, Gyaos Hyper | Arrow Video |
| 12 | Gamera the Brave | 2006 | Ryuta Tasaki | Original Gyaos, Zedus | Arrow Video |

=== Original net animation ===
| Title | Year | Director(s) | Monster co-star(s) | Eps | Ref(s) |
|---|---|---|---|---|---|
| Gamera Rebirth | 2023 | Hiroyuki Seshita | Gyaos, Jiger, Zigra, Guiron, Viras, and S-Gyaos | 6 (Netflix); 12 (NHK G) | |

=== Short film ===
| Title | Year | Director(s) | Ref(s) |
|---|---|---|---|
| Gamera | 2015 | Katsuhito Ishii | |

=== Documentary ===
| Title | Year | Director(s) | Ref(s) |
|---|---|---|---|
| GAMERA 1999 | 1999 | Hideaki Anno, Masayuki | |

=== Drama ===
| Title | Year | Director(s) | Ref(s) |
|---|---|---|---|
| Gamera – Council for gigantic organisms - (Note: Gamera – Council for gigantic organisms – (Japanese: ガメラ－巨大生物審議会－, Hepburn: Gamera Kyodai Seibutsu Shingikai)) | 1999 | Shusuke Kaneko | |

== Other media ==
=== Home media ===
In 2003, Alpha Video released the American versions of four Shōwa films on pan and scan DVDs: Gammera the Invincible, Gamera vs. Barugon (as War of the Monsters), Gamera vs. Viras (as Destroy All Planets) and Gamera vs. Guiron (as Attack of the Monsters).

In 2010, Shout! Factory acquired the rights from Kadokawa Pictures for all eight of the Showa Gamera films to release the uncut Japanese versions on DVD for the first time ever in North America. These "Special Edition" DVDs were released in sequential order, starting with Gamera, the Giant Monster on 18 May 2010, followed by Gamera vs. Barugon and two double features: Gamera vs. Gyaos with Gamera vs. Viras, and Gamera vs. Guiron with Gamera vs. Jiger. On 15 March 2011, Shout! Factory released the last two films of the Showa series in a double feature of Gamera vs. Zigra with Gamera: Super Monster. Shout! Factory later released MST3K vs. Gamera, a special 21st volume of Mystery Science Theater 3000 containing the episodes featuring all five Gamera movies from the show's third season.

On 29 April 2014, Mill Creek Entertainment released the eight Showa Gamera films (1965–1980) on Blu-ray in two volumes, Gamera: The Ultimate Collection Volume 1 and Gamera: The Ultimate Collection Volume 2, featuring the original widescreen video and original Japanese audio only with English subtitles, and also the first 11 films (1965–1999) on DVD again as The Gamera Legacy Collection: 1965 – 1999, also featuring the original widescreen video and original Japanese audio only with English subtitles. The Heisei trilogy was re-released on Blu-ray earlier from Mill Creek Entertainment on 27 September 2011, once again featuring the original widescreen video and original Japanese audio only with English subtitles.

On 17 August 2020, Arrow Video released a Blu-ray box set titled Gamera: The Complete Collection. The set features the original Japanese cuts for all 12 films, with English audio options; the Blu-ray debut of Gammera the Invincible and War of the Monsters; digital HD transfers and 4K restorations of the Heisei trilogy; case artwork by Matt Frank; audio commentaries by August Ragone, David Kalat, Steve Ryfle, Ed Godziszewski, Sean Rhoads, and Brooke McCorkle; a full color hardcover reprint of Dark Horse Comics' four-issue comic book miniseries Gamera the Guardian of the Universe; the English-language printing debut of the comic book story Gamera: The Last Hope by Matt Frank and Joshua Bugosh, which was originally published as a fan fiction; and an 80-page book featuring a retrospective on the series by Patrick Macias with illustrations by Jolyon Yates.

=== Comics ===
The first issue of the comic book miniseries Gamera the Guardian of the Universe by Dark Horse Comics

Aside from movie and anime based manga, there have been supplemental manga productions to expand lore of film and anime productions, such as Giant Monster Gamera (1994), Gamera 2: Attack of Legion (1996) by Takashi Teshirogi, Gamera Side Story: Version 2.5 (1999), Gamera vs. Morphos (1999), Gamera vs. Barugon: Comic Version (2003), Gamera 2006: Hard Link (2006), and Gamera Rebirth Code Thyrsos (2023).

Dark Horse Comics, which had previously involved Gamera and other characters including King Kong and Godzilla and Mothra and additional Toho monsters within a 1988 comic, published a four-issue miniseries based on Gamera called Gamera the Guardian of the Universe in 1996. The miniseries features Gamera, Gyaos, Zigra, and Viras. The manga series Dr. Slump, written and illustrated by Akira Toriyama, depicts several individuals of Gamera, along with Guiron and a human named Gyaos, and a Daimajin parody as appearing in the land of Penguin Village. Gajira "Gatchan" Norimaki's name is also a reference to Gamera. In the manga series Dragon Ball, also by Toriyama, a flying turtle which resembles a smaller version of Gamera is summoned by Master Roshi to carry him to Fire Mountain. There are references to Gamera and Daimajin franchises in chapters of the manga series KochiKame: Tokyo Beat Cops, written and illustrated by Osamu Akimoto, and Kinnikuman, created by Yudetamago. These chapters appear in Gamera: Super Monster, the eighth film in the franchise.

=== Novels ===
Aside from novelizations based on film and anime of the series, Gamera, Daimajin, and adversaries made appearances in several exoteric novels, such as the one by Shinichiro Inoue, the spin-off novelization of The Great Yokai War: Guardians, the USO Makoto Yōkai Hyaku Monogatari series by Natsuhiko Kyogoku, and several others by Kō Machida and Yoshiki Shibata.

=== Television ===
An attempt to produce a television Gamera series existed in 1970s. Gamera repeatedly appeared in the two television series Sailor Fight! and Cosplay Warrior Cutie Knight in 1990s. A re-edited edition of the 2023 Netflix series Gamera Rebirth was broadcast on NHK General TV in 2025.

The first, local TV season of Mystery Science Theater 3000 includes five episodes which each feature a film from the Gamera franchise's Shōwa period: Gamera, the Giant Monster, Gamera vs. Barugon, Gamera vs. Gyaos, Gamera vs. Guiron, and Gamera vs. Zigra. The same five films were re-used in the show's third national season. The thirteenth season of the show also contains an episode that features Gamera vs. Jiger.

There have been numerous references to the franchise, and Gamera along with his foes and Daimajin have appeared in various television programs and anime such as Dr. Slump and Dragon Ball, Urusei Yatsura, The Simpsons, Franklin, the 1979 show Godzilla, Gamera, Ultraman! Assemble for Kaiju Quiz!!, several popular variety shows (jp)(jp), and so on. Gamera has also been featured in respective television advertisements for Calbee (1989) and Mitsui Sumitomo Insurance Group (2010); the latter featured actors including Maki Horikita, and was filmed by Shinichi Wakasa, Wakasa's company Monster's, and Jun Kawanishi. Akira Ohashi again played Gamera.

=== Video games ===
Gamera appeared in several video games released in 1995, including Gamera: Daikaiju Kuchu Kessen for the Game Boy, Gamera: Gyaosu Gekimetsu Sakusen for the Super Famicom, and Gamera: The Time Adventure for the Bandai Playdia. In 1997, Gamera 2000 was released exclusively in Japan for the PlayStation. In 2017, Gamera, Legion (soldiers and plant only), and Gyaos appeared in the video game City Shrouded in Shadow, released for the PlayStation 4, alongside characters from Godzilla, Ultraman, Rebuild of Evangelion, and Patlabor, though characters of different franchises never appear in the same level together. As of 2025, the Rebirth versions of Gamera and Guiron were also featured as playable combatants in the kaiju fighting game GigaBash, along with six monsters from the Godzilla franchise, and five characters (plus one assistant monster) from the Ultraman franchise.

Additional collaborations have been made with The Tower II, Monster Gear, Symphogear XD Unlimited, Godzilla Battle Line, Ao Oni Online, Mothra Dream Battle, The Ants: Underground Kingdom, and so on.

Additionally, there was a cancelled project for a Gamera-themed video game.

== Reception ==
=== Box office performance and critical response ===
Many of the Gamera films were commercially successful in Japan, rivaling the Godzilla franchise at the box office during the 1960s. However, they were commonly regarded as being inferior to the Godzilla films, with criticism being aimed at the derivative and absurd nature of the series. Despite this, the 1995 reboot Gamera: Guardian of the Universe was both a critical and financial success, remaining in the top 10 films in Japan for its first six weeks of release and grossing more than Godzilla vs. SpaceGodzilla, which was also playing in Japanese theaters at that time.

To date, the first film Gamera, the Giant Monster is the only Showa Gamera film to be released theatrically in the United States; however, it was heavily edited, dubbed and retitled Gammera the Invincible. While Masaichi Nagata and his Daiei (and the launching of the franchise) were related to Walt Disney, no Gamera films had been actually distributed by The Walt Disney Company, even including Gamera 2: Attack of Legion whose global distribution right was temporarily acquired by Disney due to the 1996 deal with Tokuma Shoten.

In the United States, Gamera attained prominence during the 1970s due to the burgeoning popularity of UHF television stations featuring Saturday afternoon matinée showcases such as Creature Double Feature, and later in the 1990s, when five Gamera films were featured on the television series Mystery Science Theater 3000.

- Aspects of the Showa films with child-friendly direction, limited productions and distributions, and a rather ridiculing atmosphere created through the Mystery Science Theater 3000 series presumably enhanced global impressions towards the franchise as a cheap and inferior competitor to the Godzilla franchise.

=== Legacy ===
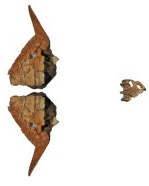
Sinemys gamera (jp) and Gamerabaena were named after Gamera.

The Gamera franchise has been prominent in expanding post-war popular cultures in Japan, such as contributions in the creations of Daimajin and Yokai Monsters, and the launches of the two "Kaiju Booms" (jp)(jp) and the "Yōkai/Kaiki Boom". These booms became influential social phenomenons, and were pushed by Masaichi Nagata's efforts to save the declining Japanese film industry and to appeal the significances of "kaiju" and "tokusatsu" genres globally. The franchise's direct and indirect influences extend among not only "kaiju" and "tokusatsu" genres, but also other entertainment industries; aside from the kaiju and yokai booms, Noriaki Yuasa also became one of the best hitmakers for domestic television industries at that time through his experiences of Gamera and other Daiei Film productions. Additionally, Yuasa and Niisan Takahashi and others had also engaged in non-Daiei tokusatsu productions including ones by the aforementioned P Productions, and contributed in the expansion of the "Kaiju Booms". In 2006, the franchise was chosen for special stamps (jp) as one of representative properties among Japanese cinema.

27 November is publicly referred to as the "Gamera Day" (Japanese: ガメラの日, Hepburn: Gamera no Hi) in Japan as the first film was released on the day in 1965. Akira Ohashi, who played Gamera and Iris in the Heisei Trilogy and also participated in related works including GMK and Nezura 1964, noted the coincidence that the day is also the birthday of Bruce Lee (Note: Chikara Hashimoto, who portrayed the Daimajin and Daimon the vampiric demon in Yokai Monsters and participated in Gamera vs. Viras and The Whale God, co-acted with Bruce Lee in the 1972 film Fist of Fury.) where Ohashi was inspired by Bruce Lee for his acting of Gamera in the Heisei Trilogy. On the other hand, Daiei Film was disintegrated on the same day several months after the release of Gamera vs. Zigra.

The city of Chōfu features Gamera and Daimajin along with characters from Shigeru Mizuki's GeGeGe no Kitarō and Akuma-kun as symbols where there have been several minor-crossovers between these franchises, and an official mascot character Gachora (Japanese: ガチョラ, Hepburn: Gachora) was designed and named after Gamera.

Todd McCarthy, in his review of Gamera: Guardian of the Universe for Variety, wrote that "Despite its horrific countenance and plated shell, Gamera remains one of the most likable of all movie monsters". Brian Solomon of the website Bloody Disgusting ranked Gamera eighth on his list of "Most Kick-Ass Giant Monsters in Movie History". Gamera was also ranked eighth on Rick Mele of Sharp's list of "Greatest Giant Monsters in Movie History". Chris Coffel of Film School Rejects wrote that "I would argue that the Gamera franchise is better than the Godzilla franchise", complimenting Gamera's turtle-like design and his affinity for children. Ken Watanabe, who played a major role in the aforementioned MonsterVerse series, noted that he preferred Gamera to Godzilla during his youth. Guillermo del Toro has noted that both Gamera and Gamera, the Giant Monster are one of favorite kaiju characters and kaiju films, and he as a child often created his own kaiju and robots based on classic characters including Gamera and Barugon.

Various authors and producers, such as Shotaro Ishinomori, Shinya Tsukamoto, Riku Sanjo, Risaku Kiridoshi, Takeshi Nakazawa, Hiro Arikawa Jeremy Robinson, Sophie Campbell, Hideaki Anno who directed GAMERA 1999, Hajime Isayama, Atsuji Yamamoto, Kōhei Horikoshi, Shunji Iwai, and Tadahisa Fujimura have acknowledged influences from the franchise on their productions, such as Nemesis Saga, Teenage Mutant Ninja Turtles, Dragon Quest: The Adventure of Dai, My Hero Academia, Nadia: The Secret of Blue Water, Neon Genesis Evangelion, Attack on Titan where its live-action film adaptation was directed by Shinji Higuchi, and How Do You Like Wednesday?, and so on.

Several authors such as Kō Machida and Yoshiki Shibata have also published original stories of Gyaos. Shinichiro Inoue and Toshio Miike participated in the 2020 disaster film Fukushima 50, and Inoue clarified its style to insert a number of telops is an homage to the Heisei Gamera trilogy. Higuchi used expertise from the Gamera trilogy for his later works such as Lorelei: The Witch of the Pacific Ocean, Sinking of Japan, Shin Godzilla, and so on.

Participants and resources from Showa Gamera films contributed in productions of kaiju productions by other film stuidios and companies, such as the 1967 South Korean-Japanese film Yongary, Monster from the Deep, and the aforementioned Daigoro vs. Goliath (1972) and Fireman (1973) by Tsuburaya Productions.

The Heisei Gamera Trilogy is widely applauded both by film makers and audiences, and has often been commended as the best tokusatsu productions in Japan. Keiichi Hasegawa remarked that the trilogy had a great impact on the entire tokusatsu genre afterwards, especially the Ultraman and the Kamen Rider franchises, (Note: According to Hasegawa, subsequent Ultraman and Kamen Rider productions would have been different if it were not for the Heisei Gamera trilogy.) including various references, and several important tokusatsu techniques were created by the trilogy while expertise and connections from previous Ultraman works including a scrapped Ultra Q project by Kaneko and Kazunori Itō and Shinji Higuchi, Ultraman 80, and Ultraman Powered and various other productions such as Gridman the Hyper Agent in return influenced the Heisei Gamera Trilogy where Showa staffs such as Noriaki Yuasa participated in the production of Ultraman 80. Digimon Tamers by Toei Animation and Ultraman Tiga by Tsuburaya Productions were re-developed from the aforementioned "Konaka Gamera" script which also became the basis for Gamera the Brave and Gamera Rebirth. As aforementioned, several Godzilla films have been pointed out to be influenced by Heisei Gamera Trilogy, and GMK and Shin Godzilla were directed by Shusuke Kaneko and Shinji Higuchi. Kaneko acknowledges the similarities between Heisei Gamera Trilogy and MonsterVerse series, and the scrapped Gamera project "Gamera 3D" which was the successor of "Godzilla 3D" by Yoshimitsu Banno served as one of predecessors of MonsterVerse. Higuchi also adapted his experiences and miniature models from the Heisei Gamera Trilogy for his 2012 short film Giant God Warrior Appears in Tokyo where Daiei franchises and Studio Ghibli were owned by Tokuma Shoten at that time, (Note: For an interview on Tokuma Shoten's Animage, which also published the aforementioned manga Gamera vs. Morphos, Hayao Miyazaki noted that he watched Gamera vs. Viras in a theater in his childhood, and was skeptical towards its eccentric plot for the entire humanity to surrender to Viras for the sake of two boys, and this experience was one of factors for him to build logical stories for his works. However, Gamera vs. Viras and Miyazaki's Future Boy Conan bear remembrances in plots as both productions were based on The Adventures of Tom Sawyer.) (Note: As aforementioned, Yasuyoshi Tokuma approached to Toho to produce Godzilla vs. Gamera before his death, based on his careers including Ghibli productions distributed by Toho, such as Princess Mononoke.) and distributions of the trilogy were also affected by Studio Ghibli productions, while the production of the 2000 film Shiki-Jitsu by Ayako Fujitani and Hideaki Anno was instead influenced by the Heisei trilogy.

- Masaya Tokuyama had been producers for Gamera: Super Monster and various Ghibli movies, and character designs of Gamera Rebirth was also somewhat affected by Studio Ghibli due to involvements of Naoya Tanaka and Mitsunori Kataama.

==== References and parodies ====
- Numerous global mediums have references to the Gamera franchise, including Godzilla and Ultra Series and other representative tokusatsu productions, (Note: Such as Godzilla, Ultra Q and Ultraman, and Gridman, and Super Sentai.) additional films, (Note: Such as Sadako DX, Into the Sun, Monster X Strikes Back: Attack the G8 Summit, Giant Monsters Appear in Tokyo, Shusuke Kaneko's Crossfire, Love & Peace, Shinpei Hayashiya's War of the Ninja Monsters: Jaron Vs. Goura, Friday the 13th: The Final Chapter, Frankenweenie, The Death of "Superman Lives": What Happened?, The Darkness, Dedication, Pacific Rim and Pacific Rim Uprising, and so on.) comics and anime (Note: Such as Pokémon, Digimon Tamers, Mario series, Cobra, Dragon Ball and Dr. Slump franchizes, The Simpsons, a South Park episode "Mecha-Streisand", Teenage Mutant Ninja Turtles, Justice League Unlimited, Green Lantern, KochiKame: Tokyo Beat Cops, Kinnikuman, Crayon Shin-chan, Cow and Boy, Monty, Thatababy, Tokyo Storm Warning, Food Wars!: Shokugeki no Soma, Yakitate!! Japan, Sgt. Frog, Negima! Magister Negi Magi, Love Hina, Gunbuster, Devilman, Lucky Star, Voltes V, Megas XLR, Detective Conan, Welcome to My Life, Uzumaki, The Grim Adventures of Billy & Mandy, Sailor Moon SuperS, Gintama, My Hero Academia, Franklin, The Adventures of Sam & Max: Freelance Police, The League of Extraordinary Gentlemen, Volume IV: The Tempest, Combat Mecha Xabungle, Usagi Yojimbo, Manga Science, Kirin, Mikarun X, Amaenja Nēyo Aware! Meisaku-kun, The Red Ranger Becomes an Adventurer in Another World, Daicon III and IV Opening Animations, Megatokyo, Pani Poni, Nurse Witch Komugi, La Blue Girl) such as Inuyasha and Urusei Yatsura, (Note: Two Black Tortoise-based characters appeared in the Inuyasha franchise; Genbu performs a spinning attack akin to Gamera, and the fire-breathing turtle kaiju Gōra in Inuyasha the Movie: Fire on the Mystic Island. Inuyasha and Sesshōmaru (jp) made cameo appearances along with Gamera and Daimajin and Daimon the vampire in USO Makoto Yōkai Hyaku Monogatari. Gamera and Gyaos and Daimajin made cameo appearances in Urusei Yatsura where Shusuke Kaneko and Kazunori Ito had participated in its anime adaptation, and they reused their ideas from Urusei Yatsura to the Heisei Gamera trilogy; Mamoru Oshii invited Kaneko to join the production of Urusei Yatsura, and Oshii was originally supposed to join the production of Gamera 2: Attack of Legion.) video games, (Note: Such as Pokémon, Digimon, As aforementioned, Gamera the Brave and Digimon Tamers and Ultraman Tiga were redeveloped from one of the original scripts of Gamera: Guardian of the Universe. Super Smash Bros., The Legend of Zelda, Castlevania and Kid Dracula, Mega Man, Sonic the Hedgehog, World of Warcraft, Final Fantasy XIV, Dragon Quest, Xenoblade Chronicles X, Star Wars, Five Nights at Freddy's, Naruto: Ultimate Ninja, The Battle Cats, Adventure Island, Palworld, Dinosaur Simulator, Earth Atlantis, Social Wars, and many others.) collectible card games, (Note: Such as Dungeons & Dragons, Magic: The Gathering, Yu-Gi-Oh! Trading Card Game, King of Tokyo, and Monster Island.) television programs, (Note: Such as How Do You Like Wednesday?, Star Trek: Deep Space Nine, The Good News (Mad Men), Voltes V: Legacy, Jumbo Monster GOMERA, Robot Chicken, Mecha-Mecha Iketeru!, Takeshi's Castle, Tensai Takeshi No Genki Ga Deru Terebi!!, Vocabulary Heaven, Boogie Woogie, Ariyoshi's Wall, Downtown no Gottsu Ee Kanji, and so on.) novels, (Note: Such as Captain Underpants, Ready Player One, Loups=Garous, Daten no Inugami: Slash Døg from the High School DxD series, Lorien Legacies, Heaven by Kō Machida, Flame City by Yoshiki Shibata, and so on.), toy merchandises, artworks, and many others. Gamera and his foes' roars were used in various other productions including the Godzilla franchise. (Note: Such as Godzilla vs. King Ghidorah, Fireman, GeGeGe no Kitarō, Pokémon, Yu-Gi-Oh!, Aura Battler Dunbine which is related to the production of Gamera Rebirth, Reideen the Brave, Voltes V, Chargeman Ken!, and so on.) Other cases include companies, musicians and songs, (Note: Such as Gamera by Tortoise and additional eponymous works by other artists such as Varga, Adem Ilhan, Jim Guthrie, 2k5Jay, Disastroid, Societys Ugly Son Paragraph President by Blackalicious, A Book of Human Language by Aceyalone, Without a Doubt by Black Sheep, Dat's My Word by DJ Honda, Ichiro’s Dilemma by Goblin Cock, 400 calci by Nanowar of Steel, Godzilla and Gamera by DJ Nu-Mark and Slimkid3, A Million And 1 Buddah Spots by Redman, Liquid Bird by The Beta Band, N.W.O. by Ministry, Evil God Awakening by Kinzoku-Yebis, MOVE) by Seikima-II, Guardian of the Universe by Oxygen Destroyer, Pink Gamera, Gamera, "Gamera" by Disastroid, Gamera is missing by Buck Dharma, Nasty on Gamera by Joey Fatts and Mike Free and others, Gamera A Gas, and many others.) and miscellaneous items have Gamera in their names or lyrics.
- Mountain Dew Code Red utilized a Gamera-esque monster for one of design motifs, where Masaichi Nagata was the business delegate and the owner of Pepsi-Cola Company in Japan.
- The extinct Cretaceous sinemyidid turtle with long spines on its carapace, Sinemys gamera (jp), classified in 1993, was named after Gamera. The extinct Cretaceous baenid turtle Gamerabaena sonsalla, classified in 2010, was named after Gamera. A specimen of Nodosauridae was also nicknamed after the kaiju.
- A magnetosphere code to study plasma bubbles was named after the kaiju, and the Applied Physics Laboratory partnering with Johns Hopkins University launched an associated eponymous project.
- A Philadelphia-based company Gamera, Inc has developed "Gamera", an application software to analysis online inventories which was named after the kaiju.
- The University of Maryland Gamera I human-powered helicopter, along with its successor, was named after Gamera. Developed by University of Maryland engineering students in 2011 and 2012 respectively, the name was also chosen in reference to the university's mascot, the diamondback terrapin which also became the motif for the mascot character Testudo, as well as to flights undertaken by Japanese human-powered helicopters years prior.
- In July 2011, Washington State University veterinarians successfully fixed a prosthetic caster onto an African spurred tortoise who was a single amputee. The turtle was named after the kaiju, where Gamera in Gamera the Brave were designed after the turtle species.
- Variety of people and objects and other topics received their nicknames after Gamera and his enemies and Daimajin. Such examples are, notable figures, (Note: Such as baseball players including Hiroshi Yukamidani, Naoyuki Naitō, and numerous players with their nicknames based on Daimajin, most notably Kazuhiro Sasaki. Additional cases include comedians Denshamichi Tetyana Hamera-Shmyrko, and Gamera Wataru, the free climber Toshiyuki Kikuchi, and the esports player "Gamera".) a number of boulders publicly referred to as "Gamera Rock" (Japanese: ガメラ岩, Hepburn: Gamera Iwa), the Tokyo International Trade Fairgrounds, the early-warning radar J/FPS-5, the Nissan Laurel, meter data management systems, a project code name by Itochu to acquire BIGMOTOR, wrestling techniques, esports techniques, stage props, military drone, and so on.

== See also ==
- Godzilla
- Sinemys gamera (jp) and Gamerabaena
- Warning from Space
- The Whale God
- Daimajin
- Yokai Monsters
