= The Great Yokai War: Guardians =

2021 film directed by Takashi Miike

- Theatrical release poster

Japanese name
- Kanji: 妖怪大戦争 ガーディアンズ
Transcriptions
- Revised Hepburn: Yōkai Daisensō Gādianzu
- Directed by: Takashi Miike
- Screenplay by: Yūsuke Watanabe
- Produced by: Misako Saka; Norikazu Tsubaki
- Starring: Kokoro Terada; Hana Sugisaki; Sakura Ando; Takahiro Miura; Yuko Oshima; Eiji Akaso; Renji Ishibashi; Kenichi Endō; Akira Emoto; Nanako Matsushima; Kazuki Kitamura; Nao Ōmori; Takao Osawa
- Cinematography: Hideo Yamamoto
- Edited by: Naoichiro Sagara
- Music by: Kōji Endō
- Production company: OLM, Inc.
- Distributed by: Toho; Kadokawa
- Release date: August 13, 2021 (Japan)
- Running time: 118 minutes
- Country: Japan
- Language: Japanese
- Box office: ¥32,972,990

The Great Yokai War: Guardians (Japanese: 妖怪大戦争 ガーディアンズ, Hepburn: Yōkai Daisensō Gādianzu) is a 2021 Japanese fantasy adventure film directed by Takashi Miike.

== Overview ==
An indirect sequel to The Great Yokai War, the film is the first Reiwa era installment of the Yokai Monsters franchise, and was released in Japan on August 13, 2021, by Toho and Kadokawa.

Among the film's cast of entities is the title character from the 1966 Daiei film series Daimajin. The character's appearance in the film was presumably influenced by Miike's unmade reboot attempt, which subsequently became the precursor of the drama series Daimajin Kanon (2010) following the commercial failure of Gamera the Brave (2006).

Gamera, the iconic kaiju associating with the creations of both Daimajin and the Yokai Monsters series, also made a cameo appearance in the spinoff prequel, The Great Yokai War: Guardians Side Story Heian Hundred Demon Tale (Japanese: 妖怪大戦争ガーディアンズ外伝 平安百鬼譚, Hepburn: Yōkai Daisensō Gādianzu Gaiden Heian Hyakkitan), while the kaiju was also briefly mentioned in the 2005 film.

The monstrous entity "Yokaiju" and its association with Inugami Gyōbu are based on the corresponding characters from the GeGeGe no Kitarō series by Shigeru Mizuki, whose participations had affected the direction of the Yokai Monsters series.

While the 2005 film featured Mizuki's hometown Sakaiminato, Tottori, Guardians instead spotlighted Musashino, Tokyo. This is a presumbed reference to both Tokorozawa Sakura Town (opened in 2020) and My Neighbor Totoro (1988), where Daiei Film and Studio Ghibli were both under the umbrella of Tokuma Shoten, leading to the associations of the Heisei Gamera trilogy and the Ghibli movies in productions.

Additionally, the film had the Yokaiju to transform into a gigantic, cherry blossom-esque tree and to dissipate at the climax. This is potentially another reference to all of the Sakura Town, previous Daimajin projects, and Studio Ghibli; it is reminiscent of the endings of Wrath of Daimajin (1966) and the 1990s novel (Note: It was redeveloped from the scrapped film project by Yasutaka Tsutsui and Katsuhiro Otomo, which was supposed to feature Steven Seagal.), and the Nightwalker's fate from Princess Mononoke (1997).

Following the previous entry, the film involved a reappearance of the demonic villain Yasunori Kato, played by Ryūnosuke Kamiki who was the cast of Inao Tadashi, the 2005 protagonist.

== Plot ==
Ancient fossils sleeping in Fossa Magna have gathered together and transformed into a giant yōkai. The destination is Tokyo. Only the yōkai were aware of the truth about this invasion, which seems to modern humans to be a natural disaster. If nothing is done, the world will be destroyed. This can be stopped by Watanabe, an elementary school student in Tokorozawa, Saitama, who inherits the blood of the legendary monster hunter. Suddenly, the great adventure of the boy who was selected as the "hero who saves the world" and the yōkai who involved him begins now.

— Kadokawa

== Cast ==
- Kokoro Terada as Kei Watanabe
- Hana Sugisaki as Fox-Faced Woman
- Rei Inomata as Dai Watanabe
- Takao Osawa as Inugami Gyōbu
- Nao Ōmori as Nao Omori
- Sakura Ando as Ubume
- Yuko Oshima as Yukionna
- Eiji Akaso as Amanojaku
- Takahiro Miura as Tengu
- Renji Ishibashi as Ōkubi
- Kenichi Endō as Yadokai
- Hiroshi Aramata as Amefurikozō
- SUMIRE as Ibarakidoji
- Takashi Okamura as Azukiarai
- Koji Okura as Shojo
- Hikakin as "Yōtuber" Hikakin
- Ryūnosuke Kamiki as Professor Katō, Kei's Homeroom teacher and Yasunori Kato in disguise
- Akira Emoto as Old Man
- Kazuki Kitamura as Tsuna Watanabe
- Nanako Matsushima as Reika Watanabe
- Myra Arai as Rokurokubi
- Tiernan as Count Dracula
- Amon Ishida as Mummy (undead)
- Chris D. as Frankenstein's monster
- Daniel M. as Evil clown
- Takumi Kato as Zombie
- Takayuki Nishimura as Yeti

== Featured yōkai ==
- Yokaiju
- Daimajin
- Fox-Faced Woman
- Inugami Gyōbu
- Nurarihyon
- Ubume
- Shōjō
- Tengu
- Yuki-onna
- Amanojaku
- Ibarakidoji
- Azukiarai
- Yadokai
- Okubi
- Amefurikozo
- Kappa
- Karakasakozo
- Rokurokubi
- Yokai Hikakin
- Ittan-momen
- Bake-Danuki
- Ushi-oni motorcycle
- Count Dracula
- Frankenstein
- Yeti
- Xingtian
- A Merman
- A Mermaid
- Medusa
- A Cyclops
- A zombie
- A witch
- A troll
- A fish-man
- An Egyptian mummy
- A killer clown
- A haunted doll

== Production ==
Production credits

- Takashi Miike – director
- Raku Nagao – assistant director
- Tsuguhiko Kadokawa – executive producer
- Hiroshi Aramata – executive producer
- Shigeji Maeda – co-producer
- Tomoyuki Imai – line producer
- Tomonori Aoki – line producer
- Yuji Hayashida – art director
- Katsuya Terada – yōkai designer
- Junya Inoue – yōkai designer
- Hiromitsu Soma – yōkai designer
- Kaori Ohtagaki – visual effects supervisor

== Release ==
The film premiered in Japan on August 13 and internationally at the online event Fantasia International Film Festival on August 25, 2021.

Its U.S. premiere took place on August 28, 2021, as part of the Japan Cuts film festival held by the Japan Society in New York City.

== Manga adaptation ==
On December 26, 2020 a manga adaptation of the film began being serialized by Kadokawa in Monthly Shōnen Ace.

== Mobile game ==
A collaboration with the mobile game Ao Oni Online of the Ao Oni series was made, and Daimajin and Yōkaiju and Hikakin appeared as playable characters and an ornament where the game also collaborated with related figures and productions including Hikakin and Dekakin between 2021 and 2023, and the Netflix series Gamera Rebirth in 2023.

== See also ==
- List of Japanese films of 2021
- List of fantasy films of the 2020s
- List of monster movies
