= Daimajin =

1966 Japanese film trilogy

- 1984 poster for a screening of the trilogy.
- Created by: Daiei Film
- Original work: Daimajin (1966)
- Owner: Kadokawa Daiei Studio
- Years: 1966–2021

Daimajin (大魔神, Daimajin; lit. 'Giant Demon God') is a Japanese tokusatsu (Note: While Daimajin is often regarded as a kaiju by Western sources, it has been cited in Japan as not meeting the requirements to qualify as a kaiju.) series centering on an eponymous vengeful deity. It initially consisted of a film trilogy shot simultaneously and released in 1966 with three different directors and predominantly the same crew. The series was produced by Daiei Film and contained similar plot structures involving villages being oppressed by warlords, forcing them beseech Daimajin (the giant demon god) to save them.

While the franchise's expansion is limited, Daimajin became a leading tokusatsu mascot of Daiei after Gamera, and has establish himself as an icon of Japanese popular cultures, being recurringly referenced and parodied.

== Concepts ==
Haniwa Warrior in Keiko Armor is the major design motif for Daimajin.

Daimajin's prototype concept was originally designed as the "Space Iceman" (Japanese: 宇宙氷人, Hepburn: Uchū Hyōjin), an extraterrestrial humanoid monster and the first foe of Gamera. Its concept was redeveloped into both Daimajin and the ice-breathing kaiju Barugon in Gamera vs. Barugon (1966). The filmmakers were also inspired by Jötunn from the Norse mythology, the Giant of the Snows from the 1912 film The Conquest of the Pole, and the golem from the 1936 Czechoslovak film Le Golem, which was redistributed by Daiei Film in the post-war period.

Expertise obtained during the production of the 1964 film Flight from Ashiya, in which Noriaki Yuasa and others had also participated in, also contributed in the launch of the franchise. Riki Hoshimoto was hired as the suit performer for Daimajin.

Daimajin Kanon (2010) was produced under the influences from the Kamen Rider franchise, and the television drama series didn't follow the basic concept of the character originating in traditional images of western golems. This presumably stagnated both the receptions and the ratings of the show, and The Great Yokai War: Guardians (2021) was inferred as an attempt to fix the course. The film and its major objective "Yokaiju" (and its fate) are potential references to previous Daimajin projects in particular for the endings of Wrath of Daimajin (1966) and the below-mentioned reboot attempt by Yasutaka Tsutsui, GeGeGe no Kitarō series, and Studio Ghibli movies.

== History ==
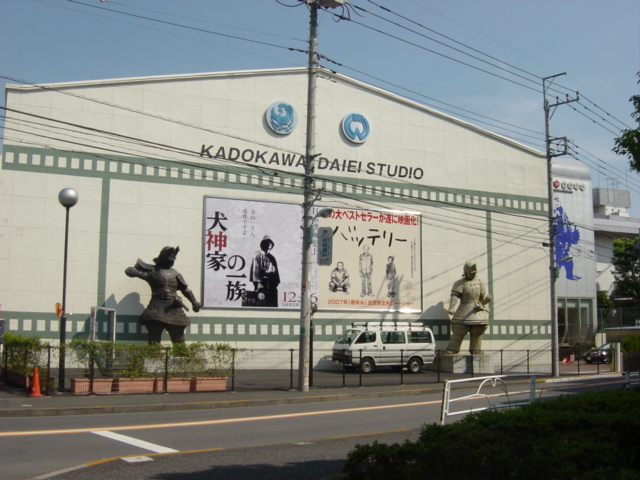
Sculptures of Daimajin along with an illustration of Gamera at Kadokawa Daiei Studio office in Chofu, in which the Daimajin Shrine is situated; They also serve as mascots of the city.

After the original film trilogy released in quick succession in 1966, the series was revived in 2010 as a television drama titled Daimajin Kanon, broadcast on TV Tokyo. The Daimajin character also made a cameo appearance in the 2021 film The Great Yokai War: Guardians.

Using two studios in Tokyo and Kyoto, Daiei succeeded in simultaneously producing Gamera, Daimajin, and Yokai Monsters franchises, exceeding Toho - Tsuburaya Productions cooperation in production rates. The double featuring of Gamera vs. Barugon and Daimajin in 1966 was highly successful beyond anticipations, increasing Daiei's entire annual box office revenue twofold.

However, as Daiei Film was already on the verge of bankruptcy, budgetary and staff shortages prevented the company from establishing a stable film production system, and producing three Daimajin films within the same year (1966) presumably accelerated its financial difficulties and resulted in the cancellation of subsequent Daimajin projects. Director Noriaki Yuasa turned down Daiei's request to produce two to three Gamera films annually due to production constraints (including stressed staffs) and budgetary concerns.

Following the bankruptcy of Daiei Film in 1971, all of its representative, post-Gamera tokusatsu franchises (Gamera and Daimajin and Yokai Monsters) have faced repeated inactivity in productions. There existed several revival attempts of Daimajin and Yokai Monsters along with the Gamera franchise, the most popular of the three, by Daiei Film's successors (Tokuma Shoten and Kadokawa Corporation). For example, (aside from previously cancelled Gamera projects after Gamera: Super Monster) the Heisei Gamera trilogy initially started as an attempt to revive Daimajin, and the company later launched another Daimajin project along with the Heisei Gamera trilogy. This was supposed to feature Steven Seagal, the father of Ayako Fujitani who played the human protagonist of the Gamera trilogy, (Note: Gamera: Guardian of the Universe was used as a background footage in Seagal's Into the Sun (2005), including scenes having Ayako Fujitani.) and the plot written by Yasutaka Tsutsui and Katsuhiro Otomo was later published as a novelization. There had been additional revival attempts, such as one by Ishiro Honda in 1980s an alleged 1990s project by Orange Sky Golden Harvest with starring Kevin Costner, and Kadokawa, after acquiring the copyrights of Daiei properties from Tokuma Shoten, announced a Daimajin project along with Godzilla vs. Gamera crossover in 2002, which followed Yasuyoshi Tokuma's attempts to produce a crossover between the two kaiju prior to his death in 2000, however Toho eventually turned down the proposals and Gamera the Brave was instead produced.

Among the three franchises, only the Daimajin has not received any new film productions, except for the television drama Daimajin Kanon and the 2021 Yokai Monsters installment The Great Yokai War: Guardians. Takashi Miike, who has directed The Great Yokai War and The Great Yokai War: Guardians, had also attempted to revive Daimajin in the late 2000s along with the 2006 film Gamera the Brave, which was allegedly cancelled due to the box office result of the 2006 Gamera film and was eventually redeveloped into Daimajin Kanon. The 2021 film was the first direct theatrical appearance of the character since 1966, and its prequel side story involved Gamera's cameo appearance. Miike described the difficulty to revive the Daimajin franchise based on budgetary problems; Daimajin (as a character) is physically much smaller than traditional kaiju and Ultraman and directly interacts with humans. This results in necessity of increase in Daimajin's size to act among modern buildings, and expensive (large-scaled, life-sized, and detailed) models and props for filming.

Along with the budgetary requirement, a rather predictable storyline of the franchise had also triggered the cancellation of the reboot attempt as a television series Majin Ikaruga (魔人斑鳩, Majin Ikaruga; lit. 'Demon Man of Ikaruga') in 1960s by Noriaki Yuasa, Mamoru Sasaki, and Yoji Hashimoto; Yuasa and Sasaki (Note: Yuasa and Sasaki had previously co-worked for various television dramas such as Princess Comet and Okusama wa 18-sai.) were also originally appointed for Daimajin Kanon.

Daimajin along with Gamera, Daimon (created under the significant influence of Daimajin), Sadako Yamamura, and characters from the GeGeGe no Kitarō series (Note: There have been occasions for models and suits of these characters to be exhibited alongside.) and multiple other characters from various franchises made cameo appearances in the novel series USO MAKOTO Yōkai Hyaku Monogatari by Natsuhiko Kyogoku. Additionally, Daimajin made an appearance in the 2015 novel Daimajin Denki, which is designated as a crossover with Osamu Tezuka's Majin Garon (the title robot Garon has also appeared in Astro Boy and Ambassador Magma).

Daimajin has appeared in several television advertisements such as ones by Toyota, Suntory, and Acecook.

In 1988, Masahiko Katto produced an independent film titled The Resurrection of Daimajin.

== Films and television ==
Films of the Monsterverse
| Film | Release date | Director | Screenwriter | Producer | Ref. |
|---|---|---|---|---|---|
| Daimajin (大魔神) | April 17, 1966 | Kimiyoshi Yasuda | Tetsuro Yoshida | Masaichi Nagata | |
| Return of Daimajin (大魔神怒る) | August 13, 1966 | Kenji Misumi | Tetsuro Yoshida | Masaichi Nagata | |
| Wrath of Daimajin (大魔神逆襲) | December 10, 1966 | Kazuo Mori | Tetsuro Yoshida | Masaichi Nagata | |
| The Great Yokai War: Guardians (妖怪大戦争 ガーディアンズ) | August 13, 2021 | Takashi Miike | Yūsuke Watanabe | Misako Saka and Norikazu Tsubaki | |

=== Daimajin ===
In Japan, a household of peasants cower during a series of earth tremors that are interpreted as the escape attempts of Daimajin, a spirit trapped within the mountain. These events are observed by Lord Hanabasa, and his chamberlain, Samanosuke, who are attempting to seize power in the area. As the villagers pray at a shrine, Samanosuke and his henchmen slaughter Hanabasa's family, with only his son and daughter escaping, who are assisted by the samurai Kogenta. Back at the shrine, Samanosuke's men begin to take over and forbid gatherings at the shrine. After failing to warn Samanosuke about his actions, the priestess Shinobu returns home, finding Kogenta and the two children. Shinobu takes them up the side of the mountain into forbidden territory, where the stone idol which is Daimajin stands, half-buried in the side of the mountain. The children grow to adulthood with the son, Tadafumi (Yoshihiko Aoyama) reaching his 18th birthday. Meanwhile, Samanosuke has enslaved the village. After several attempts to return peace and freedom to the village, Samanosuke's men travel up the mountain to smash Daimajin. Damaijin is asked by the daughter, Kozasa (Miwa Takada) to save her brother, with the idol removing a mask to reveal Daimajin's real face, leading it to rise from the mountain and exact its wrath on Samanosuke and his fortress. Daimajin's wrath begins to grow to attacking everything in sight, only stopping when Kozasa's tears land on Daimajin's feet.

The film was released in the United States by Daiei International with subtitles in an English-dubbed version by Bernard Lewis. The film has been released under many English alternative titles, such as The Devil Got Angry, The Vengeance of the Monster, and Majin, the Monster of Terror.

=== Return of Daimajin ===
In Japan, Daimajin is found on an island in the middle of a lake which is surrounded by two peaceful villages, Chigusa and Nagoshi. In a distant third village ruled by an evil lord, the citizens flee to Chigusa to take refuge. One day, the evil lord decides to take over the two villages and attempts to do so at an annual festival. After being pursued by the evil lord's army, the people of Chigusa and Nagoshi find themselves on the island with the Daimajin statue. The evil lord has his men shatter the statue with a large amount of gunpowder, and the pieces are thrown into the lake. Nevertheless, Daimajin awakens and attacks the lord and his men, destroying them, before being calmed once again.

Return of Daimajin was never released theatrically in the United States, but was released to television by AIP-TV in 1967. It also has been released under the alternate title Return of the Giant Majin

=== Wrath of Daimajin ===
In Japan, Daimajin is found at the top of a mountain. Fathers in a village have been captured by an evil lord and forced to work in labor camps. Four of their sons decide to go rescue them, even if it means crossing the mountain where Daimajin is. The four sons pay their respects to the statue when they pass it so that they do not incur its wrath. The evil lord eventually angers the statue, who comes to life and destroys all those who have not been paying respect to it. The children and their fathers are spared, while the work camp is destroyed.

Wrath of Daimajin was never released theatrically in the United States, but received the international English title of Majin Strikes Again.

=== The Great Yokai War: Guardians ===
Daimajin appears as a notable character in the 2021 film The Great Yokai War: Guardians, which is a sequel to The Great Yokai War and part of the Yokai Monsters series. Gamera also appeared in its side story novel.

=== Daimajin Kanon ===
| Title | Japanese release date | Ref(s) |
|---|---|---|
| Daimajin Kanon (大魔神カノン) | April 2, 2010 | |

The 2010 drama Daimajin Kanon is the sole television series of the franchise. Originally, Noriaki Yuasa from the Gamera franchise was appointed for the director along with Mamoru Sasaki as the writer and additional film crews from Toei's Kamen Rider franchise.

== Additional crew ==
| Occupation | Film | | |
| Occupation | Daimajin (1966) | Return of Daimajin (1966) | Wrath of Daimajin (1966) |
|---|---|---|---|
| Composer(s) | Akira Ifukube | Akira Ifukube | Akira Ifukube |
| Director of photography | Fujio Morita | Fujio Morita | Fujio Morita |
| Editor(s) | Hiroshi Yamada | Kanji Suganuma | Toshio Taniguchi |
| Special Effects | Yoshiyuki Kuroda | Yoshiyuki Kuroda | Yoshiyuki Kuroda |
| Ref(s) | | | |

== Home media ==
| Title | Format | Release date | Films | Reference |
|---|---|---|---|---|
| Daimajin Collection: Daimajin, Return of Daimajin, Wrath of Daimajin | DVD | October 22, 2002 | Daimajin, Return of Daimajin, Daimajin Strikes Again | |
| Daimajin | DVD | February 1, 2005 | Daimajin | |
| Daimajin: Return of Daimajin | DVD | April 12, 2005 | Return of The Giant Majin | |
| Daimajin: Wrath of Daimajin | DVD | May 3, 2005 | Daimajin Strikes Again | |
| Daimajin | Blu-ray | September 18, 2012 | Daimajin, Return of Daimajin, Daimajin Strikes Again | |
| The Daimajin Trilogy | Blu-ray | July 26, 2021 | Daimajin, Return of Daimajin, Wrath of Daimajin | |

== Legacy ==
Successes of Gamera and Daimajin franchises contributed in subtle improvements of financial situation of Daiei Film (while rushed productions of Daimajin films worsened the strength of the company), and resulted in the launching of the Yokai Monsters including the creation of Daimon the vampire. Kazunori Ito had presumably inserted references to Wrath of Daimajin within his Heisei Gamera trilogy; snowscapes in Gamera 2: Attack of Legion, and taboo breaking of a mountain village and its hazardous consequences in Gamera 3: Revenge of Iris.

The aforementioned GeGeGe no Kitarō and Akuma-kun series by Shigeru Mizuki, who had associated with Yokai Monsters, and Urusei Yatsura, introduced characters based on Gamera and Daimajin franchises. (Note: Gamera and Gyaos and Daimajin made cameo appearances in the Urusei Yatsura franchise, where Shusuke Kaneko and Kazunori Ito reused their ideas from Urusei Yatsura episodes for their Heisei Gamera trilogy; Kaneko participated in the anime due to an invitation from Mamoru Oshii, and Oshii was originally supposed to join the production of Gamera 2: Attack of Legion. Several references to Gamera has also been introduced in the Inuyasha franchise.) Kyogoku Natsuhiko made Gamera, Daimajin, GeGeGe no Kitarō characters, Sadako Yamamura Inuyasha and Sesshomaru (jp) to co-appear in his USO MAKOTO Yōkai Hyaku Monogatari series. Both Gamera and Daimajin also appeared briefly in Daicon III and IV Opening Animations (1981) by Hideaki Anno, who later directed both GAMERA 1999 and Shiki-Jitsu.

Along with Gamera, the Daimajin trilogy has gained popurarity and contributed in the First Kaiju Boom prior to the bankruptcy of Daiei in 1971. Despite the franchise's rather inactive history, the character and the term "Daimajin" became influential in Japan, and have appeared as references and parodies among numerous mediums (along with several direct cameo appearances), such as films, (Note: Such as Monster X Strikes Back: Attack the G8 Summit.) comics and anime, (Note: Numerous cases such as GeGeGe no Kitarō and Akuma-kun franchises, Dr.Slump, Godzilla comics, Urusei Yatsura, KochiKame: Tokyo Beat Cops, Sakigake!! Otokojuku series, Doraemon: Nobita and the Haunts of Evil (1982), The Monster Kid, High School! Kimengumi, Martian Successor Nadesico, Ramen Discovery series, Manga Nippon Mukashibanashi, and so on.) video games, (Note: Such as Dragon Quest, Genpei Tōma Den, War of the Monsters, Mega Man 8, Ginga Ninkyouden, Gekibo: Gekisha Boy series, Magic Sword: Heroic Fantasy, Final Fantasy Legend II.), variety shows, (Note: Such as Tensai Takeshi No Genki Ga Deru Terebi!!, Vocabulary Heaven, Waratte Pon!, Ken Shimura's Bakatonosama, Ken Shimura's Daijobuda, and WHAT A FANTASTIC NIGHT.) production varieties, and so on.

Daimajin's influences can be seen in many other productions (in particular ones involving gigantic humanoids and robots), such as the Ultraman series, the Kamen Rider series, the Super Sentai series, both the Mazinger Z and God Mazinger franchises, Giant Robo, and many others (Note: Such as the Patlabor series by the aforementioned Kazunori Ito and Mamoru Oshii, Majin Hunter Mitsurugi which was a redeveloped project from an attempt to make a live-action adaptation of the aforementioned Majin Garon, Majin Hunter Mitsurugi, Denjin Zaborger which involved Noriaki Yuasa and other stakeholders from Gamera and other Daiei films, Uchū Majin Daikengo, Giant Gorg, Orochi, the Eight-Headed Dragon and its related multimedia franchises, Chousei Kantai Sazer-X, and so on.), It! (1967), Pulgasari (1985) which itself was produced under the influences from Godzilla, Robin Hood: Prince of Thieves (1991) by aforementioned Kevin Costner, and so on.

Various figures were nicknamed after the character; such cases are a number of professional baseball players most notably Kazuhiro Sasaki, (Note: Various players were subsequently nicknamed "Daimajin" in accordance with Sasaki, and Sasaki has participated in collaborations and advertisements with the franchise.) a boat racer Masato Aki and a competition race related to him, professional mahjong player Masahito Iida, and several comedian groups.

In response to the repeated vandalisms targeting national treasures and important cultural properties of Nara Prefecture in 2010s (jp), the prefecture and its school committee (jp) and the Nara Prefectural Police designated Daimajin as the mascot character for crime prevention posters; Wrath of Daimajin has been designated as a film having an association with the prefecture.

== See also ==
- Gamera
- Yokai Monsters: Spook Warfare
- The Great Yokai War: Guardians
- Chikara Hashimoto
- Akira Ifukube

== Bibliography ==
- Galbraith IV, Stuart (1996). The Japanese Filmography: 1900 through 1994. McFarland. ISBN 0786400323.
- Oritz-Moya, Fernando (2016). Murguía, Salvador Jimenez (ed.). The Encyclopedia of Japanese Horror Films. Rowman & Littlefield. ISBN 9781442261679.
