= Yokai Monsters: 100 Monsters =

1968 film directed by Kimiyoshi Yasuda

- Theatrical release poster
- Directed by: Kimiyoshi Yasuda
- Screenplay by: Tetsurō Yoshida
- Produced by: Yamato Yashiro
- Starring: Shinobu Araki; Jun Fujimaki; Ryûtarô Gomi; Shozo Hayashiya
- Cinematography: Yasukazu Takemura
- Edited by: Kanji Suganuma
- Music by: Michiaki Watanabe (as Chumei Watanabe)
- Production company: Daiei Film
- Distributed by: Daiei International Films
- Release date: 20 March 1968
- Running time: 80 minutes
- Country: Japan
- Language: Japanese

Yokai Monsters: 100 Monsters (Japanese: 妖怪百物語, Hepburn: Yōkai Hyaku Monogatari; lit. One Hundred Yōkai Tales) is a 1968 Japanese fantasy horror film directed by Kimiyoshi Yasuda, with special effects by Yoshiyuki Kuroda. It is the first in a trilogy of films produced in the late 1960s, which focus around Japanese monsters known collectively as yōkai.

The films, produced by Daiei Film, all make extensive use of practical special effects known as tokusatsu. They largely make use of actors in costumes and puppetry. In some scenes, there are even examples of traditional animation.

Notably darker in tone than its more famous sequel, Yokai Monsters: 100 Monsters focuses much more on a traditional story than it does on its titular monsters. While monsters do appear throughout the film, they are relegated to antagonistic roles, more akin to their appearances in traditional kaidan.

== Plot ==
A rich landowner intends to tear down a local shrine and other houses to build a brothel. He holds a Hyakumonogatari Kaidankai ceremony during which various tales of yōkai are told, such as the tales of kasa-obake (an umbrella tsukumogami), and a long-necked rokurokubi. However, the landowner omits the purification ceremony at the end to ward off the evil spirit conjured up during the telling of tales, after which the landowner and his supporters are scared to death or driven mad by the angered spirits, who at the end of the movie are seen parading out of the town with barrels of sake.

== Production ==
- Yoshinobu Nishioka - Art direction

== Sequels ==
Yokai Monsters: 100 Monsters was followed by two sequels: Yokai Monsters: Spook Warfare, released later that same year in 1968, and Yokai Monsters: Along with Ghosts, released in 1969.
