= Yokai Monsters =

Trilogy of Japanese horror/fantasy films

Yokai Monsters (妖怪シリーズ) is a trilogy of Japanese horror/fantasy films written by Tetsuro Yoshida and released in the late 1960s. The films were produced by Daiei Film, and productions were largely influenced by Gamera and Daimajin franchises where Daimajin was also redeveloped from the Gamera franchise, and minor references among Gamera films and Daimajin and yōkai films to each other were inserted within respective franchises on various occasions.

== About ==
There were originally three movies made:

- Yokai Monsters: 100 Monsters (March 1968)
- Yokai Monsters: Spook Warfare (December 1968)
- Yokai Monsters: Along with Ghosts (March 1969)

While not canonically linked, all three were thematically joined by their inclusion of a group of creatures from Japanese mythology known as yōkai (妖怪, lit. "strange things").

== Influence and legacy ==
Receiving little attention outside Japan, the films are remembered mainly for their special effects, which include a lot of puppetry, suitmation, and even traditional animation. The films made use of yōkai ("strange apparition"), based on traditional illustrations from Japanese folklore. The puppet used for the Kasa-obake in particular has become a recognizable rendering of the creature.

Involvement of Shigeru Mizuki and Hiroshi Aramata and Natsuhiko Kyogoku resulted in crossovers most notably with Teito Monogatari series to feature Yasunori Katō as the main antagonist in the 2005 film, and with GeGeGe no Kitarō franchise and Tōfu-kozō series by Kyogoku and other franchises to a lesser extent.

Kazuo Umezu also associated with the franchise, and his manga-based 1968 film The Snake Girl and the Silver-Haired Witch was also influenced by the Gamera franchise and was distributed along with Yokai Monsters: Spook Warfare, while the following project to produce a live-action adaptation of Cat Eyed Boy was cancelled due to the financial situation of Daiei Film. The 2006 film God's Left Hand, Devil's Right Hand which was based on the manga of the same name by Umezu was also directed by Shusuke Kaneko.

== Reboot series ==
In 2005, Takashi Miike directed a remake of Yokai Monsters: Spook Warfare titled The Great Yokai War. The film is not officially related to the Yokai Monsters trilogy, but draws a lot of its influence from similar sources, notably the legend of Momotarō and Shigeru Mizuki's GeGeGe no Kitarō series of the same name. Mizuki himself appears in this version, though neither the remake nor the original films make use of his yōkai creations, preferring instead to feature more traditional creatures.

A sequel to The Great Yokai War, titled The Great Yokai War: Guardians, was released in Japan on August 13, 2021. Daimajin appeared in the film, and Gamera made a cameo appearance in its spinoff novelization where Takashi Miike attempted to reboot Daimajin in late 2000s along with the release of the 2006 Gamera film Gamera the Brave.

Yōkai Heaven and its sequel Yōkai Heaven Ghost Hero by Makoto Tezuka in 1986 and 1990, and Sakuya Yōkaiden in 2000 were released by different companies, however these films were redeveloped from reboot attempts of the Yokai Monsters by Daiei Films and Tokuma Shoten, also appointing staffs previously involved in the Gamera franchise including the director Tomoo Haraguchi and others such as Shinji Higuchi.

Production of the 2003 horror film One Missed Call, along with the 2004 film Install, was influenced by cancelled projects by Yoichi Arishige and Daiei Film.

== See also ==
- Gamera
- Daimajin
- Teito Monogatari
- Shigeru Mizuki
- Kazuo Umezu
- Hiroshi Aramata
- Kyogoku Natsuhiko
- Miyuki Miyabe
