= Yokai Monsters: Spook Warfare =

1968 film directed by Yoshiyuki Kuroda

- Theatrical release poster
- Directed by: Yoshiyuki Kuroda
- Screenplay by: Tetsurō Yoshida
- Based on: Folk tales of Momotarō, and The Great Yokai War by Shigeru Mizuki
- Produced by: Yamato Yashiro
- Starring: Chikara Hashimoto; Akane Kawasaki; Yoshihiko Aoyama; Takashi Kanda; Keiko Yukitomo; Ikuko Mori; Gen Kuroki
- Cinematography: Hiroshi Imai
- Edited by: Toshio Taniguchi
- Music by: Sei Ikeno
- Production company: Daiei Film
- Distributed by: Daiei
- Release date: 14 December 1968 (Japan)
- Running time: 79 minutes
- Country: Japan
- Language: Japanese

Yokai Monsters: Spook Warfare (Japanese: 妖怪大戦争, Hepburn: Yōkai Daisensō; lit. 'The Great Yokai War') (Note: Also known as Ghosts on Parade) is a 1968 Japanese fantasy horror film directed by Yoshiyuki Kuroda. It is the second in a trilogy of films produced in the late 1960s, all of which focus around traditional Japanese monsters known as yōkai. (It was preceded by Yokai Monsters: 100 Monsters (1968), and was followed by Yokai Monsters: Along with Ghosts (1969).)

Yokai Monsters: Spook Warfare, along with the other two films in the series, was produced by Daiei Film and makes extensive use of tokusatsu special effects, with the majority of the creatures being represented by actors in costumes or puppets. The film was made in Fujicolor and Daieiscope.

In 2005, director Takashi Miike released The Great Yokai War, a modern retelling of the story which borrows many elements from Spook Warfare.

== Plot ==
The film opens in the ruins of the Babylonian city of Ur, where a local legend tells of a great monster named Daimon, dormant beneath the rubble. Four thousand years later, two treasure hunters disturb the ruins, awakening Daimon, who kills them by causing a landslide. He then travels to Japan, where he encounters the samurai Lord Hyogo Isobe, kills him and drinks his blood. Assuming Isobe's form, Daimon returns to his house, where he is greeted by Isobe's daughter, Lady Chie, and fellow samurai Shinpachiro Mayama. After killing the family dog, Daimon destroys the household altars and orders his servants to burn them. An ornament he throws into a pond awakens a kappa, who witnesses Daimon drinking the blood of Isobe's steward, Saheiji Kawano. When Saheiji also displays Daimon's mannerisms and orders the altars burned, the kappa attacks Daimon but is defeated. He retreats to the woods to seek help from other yōkai.

The forest is home to the one-legged Kasa-obake, Futakuchi-onna, Rokurokubi, Nuppeppō and the wise Abura-sumashi. Initially, they dismiss the kappa's claims, noting that no such monster appears in their field guide or yōkai coloring book. Meanwhile, Lady Chie and Shinpachiro discover the maid Shinobu has fallen victim to Daimon's vampirism. Shinpachiro consults his priest uncle, who reveals that Lord Isobe is dead and that a demon has taken his form. The priest gives Shinpachiro three candles to place around Daimon while he performs destruction prayers, but Daimon reverses the magic and kills the priest.

Needing younger blood, Daimon and his retainers attack a local family. The parents are killed, but their children escape and encounter the kappa and other yōkai, who have gathered at a local "monster's shrine". Learning of the attack, the yōkai recognise their mistake and agree to fight Daimon. Their initial attacks fail, but Shinpachiro shoots Daimon in the eye, forcing him to abandon Isobe's body. Daimon then kills the new Magistrate, Lord Iori Ohdate, assumes his form and returns to the house, while Saheiji continues to resist him.

The yōkai are trapped in a warded jar after Shinpachiro's attempt to contain Daimon backfires. Futakuchi-onna and Kasa-obake, who escaped capture, discover the jar and warn Shinpachiro about Saheiji. They return to the house as Daimon, disguised as Ohdate, orders Shinpachiro's execution. The two yōkai persuade Lady Chie to release their companions. Daimon creates multiple clones to fight them, but Kasa-obake returns with a large army of yōkai from across Japan. Realising the original Daimon can be defeated only by destroying his remaining eye, they attack him as he grows to giant size. Nuppeppō carries Kasa-obake to Daimon's face, allowing him to stab the monster's eye and defeat him. With Daimon destroyed, Shinpachiro is freed and the yōkai return to their natural habitats, having defended Japan from the invading monster.

== Cast ==
- Chikara Hashimoto as Daimon
- Akane Kawasaki as Chie
- Yoshihiko Aoyama as Shinhachiro
- Takashi Kanda as Hyogo
- Osamu Okawa as Iori
- Keiko Yukitomo as Futakuchi-onna
- Ikuko Mori as Rokurokubi
- Gen Kuroki as Kappa
- Tomoo Uchida
- Gen Kimura
- Hanji Wakai
- Hideki Hanamura
- Tokio Oki
- Hiromi Inoue
- Mari Kanda

== References to Japanese culture ==
As the title suggests, the film is largely focused around yōkai (妖怪, "strange things", "goblins"): strange mythological beings from Japanese folklore. This is in contrast to the other two films in the series, which were adaptations of period dramas in which the yōkai took a backseat to human actors. The yōkai are represented as playful and heroic, which is true of many yōkai found throughout Japan's history. However, yōkai such as Futakuchi-onna and Rokurokubi in particular are normally seen to be frightening creatures who are more often found in creepy kaidan (怪談, "strange stories") tales than children's movies.

The story of Spook Warfare shares many similarities with Mizuki Shigeru's GeGeGe no Kitarō (ゲゲゲの鬼太郎, Scary Kitarou) manga and anime series of the same name which was released around the same time. Academics also point out the film's inherent similarities to the story of Momotarō, who in folklore leads a group of native animals to reclaim the island of Kikaigashima from a group of demons who have overtaken it. The winning cry of "Japanese yōkai have won!" (日本の妖怪勝ったんやぞ！ Nippon no yōkai ga kattan ya zo!) can also be taken as an affirmation of pride for Japan's native culture. Other films, such as Isao Takahata's Pom Poko similarly follow this story of native monsters driving out invading forces.

== Featured yōkai ==
Spook Warfare contains a significant roster of yōkai from many different sources. Some of the more notable ones are as follows:

Creature	Description	Artistic Renderings
=== Kappa ===	(Japanese: 河童, lit. "river-child".) With origins dating back to the year AD 379, Kappa are popular yōkai known to have appeared in print as early as 1713 in the Wakan Sansai Zue. Historically, these creatures were said to have been a significant threat to humans who went near their habitat, with author Terajima Ryōan stating that they had a particular liking for sumo and would often challenge people to wrestle. He also notes that the creature can be made immensely strong should any water be stored in its concave head, stating that this would make it "as strong as a warrior". These features are certainly shared by the kappa in the film, particularly when he attempts to bodily wrestle the physically intimidating Daimon towards the beginning of the film. The kappa also has a more threatening violent streak to its personality, folklorically being described as pulling children, adults, horses and cows into the water to drown them or even to consume their livers. However, the film's kappa is not as violent as his traditional counterpart, choosing only to act violently towards the invading monster. When confronted with the two orphaned children, the kappa is protective and ready to assist them in disbanding the retainers hunting them down.	The kappa as drawn by Toriyama Sekien in the Gazu Hyakkiyagyō. The kappa in the film is a faithful adaptation of renderings such as these.
=== Futakuchi-onna ===	(Japanese: 二口女, lit. "two-mouthed woman".) In Japanese mythology, Futakuchi-onna is a cursed woman who marries a local miser who is delighted by her apparent lack of appetite as it allows him to save money on food. Despite the woman's lack of appetite, the miser's food continues to deplete. Confused by this, he one day decides to stay at home after pretending to leave for work, that he may spy upon his wife. Following his apparent exit from the house, the woman's skull cracks open to reveal a second mouth, and her hair - once unbound - reaches out like tentacles and shovels rice into said orifice. In Spook Warfare, the more menacing aspects of Futakuchi-onna's origins are not addressed, and rather than a second mouth filled with sharp teeth there is instead a second face. In folklore, this yōkai is not known for its violence, but instead as a seemingly normal woman with a startling curse.	Futakuchi-onna by Takahara Shunsen in Ehon Hyaku Monogatari. In the film, there are notable differences in the design of the creature, including a permanently visible face with a vestigial arm as opposed to tendril-like hair feeding into a mouth.
=== Kasa-obake ===	(Japanese 付喪神, lit. "artefact spirit".) Often considered a tsukumogami, the Kasa-obake is a haunted umbrella usually depicted as having one large eye and one leg. Little is written about the Kasa-obake, but it continues to be used as a symbol of haunting. Like most other tsukumogami, the Kasa-obake is mostly harmless. However, there are examples of yōkai bearing similarities to the Kasa-obake being responsible for causing harm, such as one named Yūreigasa (Japanese: 幽霊傘, lit. "ghost umbrella"), who would blow people high into the sky on days of strong winds. The scene in which Kasa-obake floats up to Daimon's head while carrying Abura-sumashi could be seen as an echoing of this legend.	A Kasa-obake by Utagawa Yoshikazu in the Mukashi Banashi Bakemono Sugoroku. The film's design stays true to the physical appearance of renderings such as these.
=== Rokurokubi ===	(Japanese: 轆轤首, lit. "pulley neck" (referring to the pulley of a potter's wheel).) Like Futakuchi-onna, Rokurokubi is a cursed woman whose appearance is generally human, but whose curse causes disturbing distension of the neck. Rokurokubi is generally described as being harmless, but frightening: often a vengeful spirit seeking revenge for a discretion against them. The film stays relatively true to this depiction of Rokurokubi, keeping her a harmless character who uses her frightening neck-stretching as a humorous attack.	Toriyama Sekien's rendering of Rokurokubi in the Hyakki Yagyō. Note the generally normal human appearance despite the extended neck.
=== Abura-sumashi ===	(Japanese: 油すまし, lit. "oil presser".) A regionally specific yōkai found only in Amakusa in Kumamoto prefecture, the Abura-sumashi is thought to be a reincarnated spirit of oil thieves who went unpunished in life. Historically unabashed by the presence of humans, the Abura-sumashi is known to partake in call and response with people who call out its name.In the film, the Abura-sumashi is depicted as the wise leader of the yōkai group, despite these traits not being based in any mythology. Takes a lead role and uses its walking stick and the Kasa-bake to take out Daimon's eye.	An Abura-sumashi as depicted in its natural habitat. Most depictions of these creatures are consistent due to its relative modernity.
=== Nuppeppō ===	(Japanese: ぬっぺっぽう, roughly translated as "a corruption of the slang for wearing too much makeup".) The Nuppeppō is a foul-smelling, genderless mass of flesh with an outline of a face creased into the folds of its fatty exterior. Despite smelling of decaying flesh, Nuppeppō is entirely harmless. It is said that should a person consume the flesh of Nuppeppō, they will achieve eternal life.	Nuppeppō as rendered by Toriyama Sekien in the Gazu Hyakki Yagyō. The film stays relatively true to this depiction.

== Critical reception ==
The film has received positive reviews from critics and audiences. Critics praised the film's special effects, but noted with some concern that the violence and frightful nature of the film directly clashed with its supposedly child-friendly tone. Andrew Pragasam noted that while "[there] is plenty of humour and monster fun, [the] horrific elements are remarkably potent for a family film, with gory violence, chills and suspense." Reviewer Chris Sims downplayed the violent aspects of the film, however, stating that "[as] strange as the movie and its weird monsters might seem, when you get right down to it it’s no more bizarre than the fairy tales we’re all used to on this side of the Pacific, right down to our stories of cursed spinning wheels and hair-accessible towers, and really, the themes are just as universal."

== Influence and legacy ==
The costumes and puppets (many of which were produced for the first film) are some of the most recognisable realisations of traditional yōkai illustrations in cinema. The film has been the subject of numerous essays on the subject of yōkai and their role in modern media, with academics such as Zilia Papp and Michael Dylan Foster making reference to it in numerous publications.

In 2005, Takashi Miike remade the film as The Great Yokai War. The film borrowed numerous elements from the Yokai Monsters series as well as Mizuki Shigeru's Kitarō story of the same name. Mizuki himself even makes a cameo in the film.

== Home media ==
The three 1960s films were released on Region 1 DVD by ADV Films in 2003. Yokai Monsters: Spook Warfare, was released as a Region Free disc (although it says Region 3 on the cover) in Thailand by Lionheart Pictures with optional original Japanese audio and English subtitles. They are currently out of print.

In 2021 Arrow Films released a Blu-ray box set (available as both Region B and Region A) under their Arrow Video label containing the entirety of the Yokai Monsters trilogy in high definition (with Spook Warfare being newly restored in 4K by Kadokawa Pictures) as well as the 2005 Takashi Miike directed remake of Spook Warfare, The Great Yokai War.

== Bibliography ==
- Clayton, James (20 February 2010). "One Hundred Mythical Creatures in Haiku: Day LXXXII - Nuppeppo". hundredmythologyhaiku.blogspot.com.
- Foster, Michael Dylan (1998). "The Metamorphosis of the Kappa: Transformation of Folklore to Folklorism in Japan". Asian Folklore Studies. 57 (1): 1–24. doi:10.2307/1178994. JSTOR 1178994.
- Foster, Michael Dylan (2009). Pandemonium and Parade: Japanese Demonology and the Culture of Yōkai. Berkeley: University of California Press. ISBN 9780520253629.
- Foster, Michael Dylan (2014). Book of Yokai : Mysterious Creatures of Japanese Folklore. Los Angeles: University Of California Press. ISBN 978-0520271029.
- Galbraith, Stuart (1994). Japanese Science Fiction, Fantasy and Horror Films. McFarland.
- Meyer, Matthew (2013a). "Abura Sumashi". yokai.com.
- Meyer, Matthew (2013b). "Rokurokubi". yokai.com.
- Mizuki, Shigeru (1995). Gegege no Kitarō 3: Yōkai Daisensō (5. satsu. ed.). Tōkyō: Chikuma Shobō. ISBN 4-480-02883-8.
- Ortabasi, Melek (2013). "(Re)animating Folklore: Raccoon Dogs, Foxes, and Other Supernatural Japanese Citizens in Takahata Isao's Heisei Tanuki Gassen Pompoko". Marvels & Tales. 27 (2): 254–275. doi:10.13110/marvelstales.27.2.0254. S2CID 161311459.
- Papp, Zilia (11 November 2009). "Monsters at War: The Great Yōkai Wars, 1968-2005". Mechademia. 4 (War/Time): 225–239. doi:10.1353/mec.0.0073. JSTOR 41510938. S2CID 52229518.
- Pragasam, Andrew. "Yokai Monsters: Spook Warfare". The Spinning Image.
- Rolfe, James (14 February 2013). "Yokai Monsters: Spook Warfare (1968) Review". Cinemassacre. Archived from the original on 2015-10-31.
- Sims, Chris (19 April 2011). "'Yokai Monsters' Pits Japanese Umbrella Spirits Against Vampires… Sort Of". Comics Alliance. Archived from the original on 2015-09-06.
- Terajima, Ryōan (1994). Wakan Sansaizue. Tokyo: Nihon Zuihitsu Taisei Kankōkai.
- Yoda, Hiroko; Alt, Matt (2008). Yokai Attack! : the Japanese Monster Survival Guide. Illustrated by Tatsuya Morino (1st ed.). Tokyo: Kodansha International. ISBN 9784770030702.
