= The Invisible Swordsman =

- Japanese theatrical release poster

Japanese name
- Kanji: 透明剣士
Transcriptions
- Revised Hepburn: Tōmei Kenshi
- Directed by: Yoshiyuki Kuroda
- Written by: Tetsuro Yoshida
- Cinematography: Hiroshi Imai
- Edited by: Kanji Suganuma
- Music by: Takeo Watanabe
- Production company: Daiei Film
- Distributed by: Daiei
- Release date: 1970 (Japan)
- Running time: 78 minutes
- Country: Japan
- Language: Japanese

The Invisible Swordsman (Japanese: 透明剣士, Hepburn: Tōmei Kenshi) is a 1970 Japanese tokusatsu fantasy film directed by Yoshiyuki Kuroda.

== Plot ==
Sanshiro Yuzuki, the swordfighter's father, was killed by a phantom thief during the night watchman. Sanshiro, who was run away by death and ran to his father's side, was stopped by the yokai Shokera. The kind shokera, who does not resemble the strange appearance, said, "I will help you to avenge my father's death, and he taught me how to make a mysterious and effective elixir. Shokera claims that the effect lasts half an hour, and it is repeated three times before it wears off. Sanshiro was a bear from Nagaya and a childhood friend of mine. He gave me courage and confidence when I drank it. Those rogues who were violent in the bells with medicine surprised him. Sanshiro sneaked in to find the Gennoshin Dojo where the rogues had escaped, but he forgot the passage of time and was sneezed by his disciples. One day, I found that Sosuke, the father of Suzu, was attacked by a phantom thief and was seriously injured and collapsed. Sanshiro in the mysterious world saw a god of death beside Sosuke. Sanshiro sneezes away from the god of death. When Sosuke recovers his energy, Sanshiro is told that Gennoshin is the head of the phantom thief, and Gennoshin heads for the dojo. The movement made the crew go back and forth. However, Sanshiro began to appear when he chased Gennoshin, but Sanshiro's sword, which received Gennoshin's blade, pierced Gennoshin's chest. Sanshiro gained courage and confidence.

== Cast ==
- Osamu Sakai as Sanshiro Yuzuki, the Invisible Swordsman
- Yoko Atsuta as Orin
- Sanshi Katsura as Dekasuke
- Hachiro Oka as Kumasan
- Yasushi Yokoyama as Maruyoshi
- Kiyoshi Nishikawa as Kadayoshi
- Sonosuke Sawamura II
- Ryutaro Gomi
- Ryosuke Kagawa
- Gen Kimura
- Gen Kuroki
- Asao Uchida as Sosuke
- Ikkei Tamaki as Jubei
- Tokio Oki as Shokera

== Release ==
The Invisible Swordsman was released in Japan in 1970 on a double bill Gamera vs. Jiger.

== Bibliography ==
- Galbraith IV, Stuart (1996). The Japanese Filmography: 1900 through 1994. McFarland. ISBN 0786400323.
