= Hanatarō Jumon =

- Japanese movie poster
- Directed by: Kimiyoshi Yasuda
- Written by: Hajime Takaiwa
- Produced by: Shin Sakai
- Starring: Raizo Ichikawa; Narutoshi Hayashi; Mieko Kondo; Yōko Uraji
- Cinematography: Sōichi Aisaka
- Music by: Seiichi Suzuki
- Production company: Daiei Film
- Release date: February 5, 1958 (Japan)
- Running time: 86 minutes
- Country: Japan
- Language: Japanese

Hanatarō Jumon (Japanese: 花太郎呪文) is a 1958 Japanese black and white film directed by Kimiyoshi Yasuda.

== Cast ==
- Raizo Ichikawa
- Narutoshi Hayashi
- Mieko Kondo
- Yōko Uraji
