= Shūhei Izumi =

Japanese actor (born 1977)

- 和泉 宗兵
- Born: October 11, 1977 (age 49); Yokohama, Kanagawa Prefecture, Japan
- Occupation: Actor
- Years active: 2000-present
- Website: http://dehi.boy.jp/

Shūhei Izumi (和泉 宗兵, Izumi Shūhei; born October 11, 1977, in Yokohama, Kanagawa Prefecture, Japan) is a Japanese actor who has appeared in a number of television series and stage plays. He is affiliated with Seinenza Theater Company. His real name and former stage name was Tomohide Koizumi (小泉 朋英, Koizumi Tomohide). His nickname was Dehi (デヒ). He graduated from Tokai University.

== Filmography ==
=== TV series ===
Year	Title	Role	Network	Other notes
2000	Mirai Sentai Timeranger	Domon / Time Yellow	TV Asahi	Lead role
2002	Ninpuu Sentai Hurricaneger	Shurikenger / Teppei Sakaki	TV Asahi	Episode 39
2004	Akai Tsuki	Shoi Hotta	TV Tokyo	
2006	Saikai ~Yokota Megumi-san no Negai~	Hideo Kimu	NTV	
2010	Daimajin Kanon	Kaenji	TV Tokyo	
2011	Kaizoku Sentai Gokaiger	Domon	TV Asahi	Episode 40

== Stage ==
Year	Title	Role	Notes
2009	That Butler, Friendship	Undertaker	
2010/2013	Musical Black Butler: The Most Beautiful Death in The World – A Thousand Souls and The Fallen Grim Reaper	Undertaker	
2014/2015	Musical Black Butler: Lycoris that Blazes the Earth	Undertaker	
2016	Noragami: Gods and Wish	Tenjin	
2016	Musical Black Butler: Noah's Ark Circus	Undertaker	
2017	Noragami: Gods and Bonds	Tenjin	
2017	Yuugeki	Kamiue	
2017	Blue Exorcist Shimane Illuminati Arc	Mephisto Pheles	
2017	Musical Black Butler: Tango on the Campania	Undertaker	
2018	Juni Taisen: Zodiac War	Duedeculpe	
2018	Gekidan Shining from Uta no Prince-sama Polaris	Engelberg Ichinose	Original role
2018	Nil Admirari no Tenbin: Teito Genwaku Kitan	Shiginuma Takashi	
2019	Karakuri Circus	Dottore	
2019	K -RETURN OF KINGS-	Iwafune Tenkei	
2019	I-Chu the Stage: Rose Ecarlate	Kurono Makuo	Original role
2019	Bungo Stray Dogs on Stage: Three Companies Conflict	Fukuzawa Yukichi	
2019	I-Chu the Stage: Rose Ecarlate Duex	Kurono Makuo	Original role
2019	Tales of Vesperia	Alexei Dinoia	
2020	Fire Force	Joker	
2020	Bungo Stray Dogs on Stage: The Untold Origins of the Detective Agency・Osamu Dazai's Entrance Exam	Fukuzawa Yukichi	
2020	Musical The Prince of Tennis II The First Stage	Itaru Saito	
2022	Fire Force 2nd	Joker	
2025	Romeo's Blue Skies: Oath	Luini	
2025	Romeo's Blue Skies: Bond	Luini	
