= Daimajin Kanon =

- Genre: Fantasy, tokusatsu
- Written by: Shinji Ōishi; Ai Sumikawa; Naruhisa Arakawa; Shinsuke Ōnishi (jp); Miyuki Sekiguchi
- Directed by: Taro Sakamoto (jp); Nobuhiro Suzumura (jp); Atsushi Shimizu (jp)
- Starring: Yuka Rikuna (jp); Hidekazu Mashima (jp); Nao Nagasawa; Takashi Yamanaka (jp); Tsuyoshi Mori (jp); Serina Ogawa; Fuku Suzuki; Ken Maeda; Nao Kinomoto (jp); Shūhei Izumi; Sayuki Matsumoto (jp); Rie Shibata; Hiroyuki Nagato
- Voices of: Junko Minagawa; Nozomi Sasaki; Kiyoshi Kobayashi; Chō; Nobuo Tanaka (jp); Tsunehiko Kamijō
- Narrated by: Junko Minagawa
- Opening theme: "Sing Your Heart Out" by Ryoko Moriyama
- Ending theme: "Ashita Tenki ni Naare" (jp) and "Aruite Kaerou" by Lia
- Composer: Toshihiko Sahashi
- Country of origin: Japan
- Original language: Japanese
- No. of episodes: 26

Production
- Executive producer: Shinichiro Inoue (jp)
- Producer: Shigenori Takatera (jp)

Original release
- Network: TV Tokyo
- Release: April 2 – October 1, 2010

Related
- Daimajin

Daimajin Kanon (大魔神カノン) is a Japanese tokusatsu television drama produced by Kadokawa Pictures and broadcast on TV Tokyo. The series premiered on April 2, 2010. The series retells the story of the original Daimajin film in a modern Japanese setting. Consisting of 26 episodes, the series was prefaced by a manga by Seijuro Mizu (jp) in Young Ace magazine. Writing for the series is shared by Shinji Ōishi and Naruhisa Arakawa.

== Episodes ==
Each episode of the series has its own unique kanji, but they are all read as "Kanon".

1. Distant Song (歌遠) - April 2, 2010
2. His Sound (彼音) - April 9, 2010
3. Small Warmth (寡温) - April 16, 2010
4. Drunken Past (過飲) - April 23, 2010
5. Torturous Favor (苛恩) - April 30, 2010
6. Added Warmth (加温) - May 7, 2010
7. Hidden Song (歌隠) - May 14, 2010
8. Whirling Sound (渦音) - May 21, 2010
9. Summer Sound (夏音) - June 4, 2010
10. No Profit (稼無) - June 11, 2010
11. Regretted Warmth (憾温) - June 18, 2010
12. Grateful Change (化恩) - June 25, 2010
13. Misplaced Resentment (囮怨) - July 2, 2010
14. Obscured Sound (霞音) - July 9, 2010
15. Beautiful Sound (華音) - July 16, 2010
16. Valued Sound (価音) - July 23, 2010
17. Shackled Sound (枷音) - July 30, 2010
18. Distant Answer (叶遠) - August 6, 2010
19. Tragic Warmth (敢温) - August 13, 2010
20. Withered Sound (枯音) - August 20, 2010
21. Elevating Sound (佳音) - August 27, 2010
22. Penetrating Warmth (貫温) - September 3, 2010
23. Circular Origin (環因) - September 10, 2010
24. Fulfilled Destiny (果縁) - September 17, 2010
25. His Distance (彼遠) - September 24, 2010
26. Grateful Song (歌恩) - October 1, 2010

== Cast ==
- Kanon Mikazaki (巫崎 カノン, Mikazaki Kanon): Yuka Rikuna (里久鳴 祐果, Rikuna Yuka) (jp)
- Taihei (タイヘイ): Hidekazu Mashima (眞島 秀和, Mashima Hidekazu) (jp)
- Ikechiyo (イケチヨ): Nao Nagasawa (長澤 奈央, Nagasawa Nao)
- Tomosuke (トモスケ): Takashi Yamanaka (山中 崇, Yamanaka Takashi) (jp)
- Sawamori (サワモリ): Tsuyoshi Mori (森 豪士, Mori Tsuyoshi) (jp)
- Hashitaka (ハシタカ): Serina Ogawa (小川 瀬里奈, Ogawa Serina) (jp)
- Shota (ショウタ, Shōta): Fuku Suzuki (鈴木 福, Suzuki Fuku)
- Tamekichi (タメキチ): Ken Maeda (前田 健, Maeda Ken)
- Yumonji (ユモンジ): Nao Kinomoto (木野本 直, Kinomoto Nao) (jp)
- Kaenji (カエンジ): Shūhei Izumi (和泉 宗兵, Izumi Shūhei)
- Kirinoha (キリノハ): Sayuki Matsumoto (松本 さゆき, Matsumoto Sayuki) (jp)
- Otaki (オタキ): Rie Shibata (柴田 理恵, Shibata Rie)
- Jūzō (ジュウゾウ): Hiroyuki Nagato (長門 裕之, Nagato Hiroyuki)
- Buchinko (ブチンコ; Voice) & Narration: Junko Minagawa (皆川 純子, Minagawa Junko)
- Tamakko (タマッコ; Voice) & Kazahana (カザハナ; Voice): Nozomi Sasaki (ささき のぞみ, Sasaki Nozomi)
- Fukamatsu (フクマツ; Voice): Kiyoshi Kobayashi (小林 清志, Kobayashi Kiyoshi)
- Tōbee (トウベエ; Voice): Chō (チョー)
- Dōkan (ドウカン; Voice): Nobuo Tanaka (田中 信夫, Tanaka Nobuo) (jp)
- Bujin-sama (ブジンサマ; Voice): Tsunehiko Kamijō (上條 恒彦, Kamijō Tsunehiko)
- Ipadada (イパダダ): Naoki Taki (滝 直希, Taki Naoki) (jp)
- Kotaro Ushirone (後根 幸太郎, Ushirone Kōtarō): Enoku Shimegi (標 永久, Shimegi Enoku) (jp)
- Saki Uehara (上原 サキ, Uehara Saki): Natsuna (夏菜)
- Ikki (イッキ): Keisuke Watanabe (夛留見 啓助, Tarumi Keisuke) (jp)
- Shinya (シンヤ, Shin'ya): Dai Yoshimi (好美 大, Yoshimi Dai)

== Production ==
At the acquirement of Daiei Film properties from Tokuma Shoten, Kadokawa president Kazuo Kuroi (jp) originally announced to produce a Daimajin project along with Godzilla vs. Gamera, which followed Yasuyoshi Tokuma (jp)'s attempt to produce a crossover with Gamera and Godzilla before his death in 2000, however the proposals were eventually turned down by Toho. Gamera the Brave was instead produced in 2006, however its box office returns resulted in cancellation of subsequent Gamera productions and a Daimajin project by Takashi Miike. The scrapped Daimajin film by Miike was eventually redeveloped into Daimajin Kanon, while Miike made Daimajin to appear in his 2021 film The Great Yokai War: Guardians, along with Gamera appeared in its spinoff novel.

In the early stage of production of Daimajin Kanon, Noriaki Yuasa, known for his involvements in various tokusatsu productions especially the Gamera franchise, was appointed for the director of Daimajin Kanon. Other previously appointed staffs include Mamoru Sasaki as the writer, and multiple crews who have participated in Toei's Kamen Rider franchise. Yuasa and Sasaki, previously co-participated in various television dramas such as Princess Comet and Okusama wa 18-sai, along with Yoji Hashimoto (jp), once attempted to produce a television series of Daimajin in 1960s, however it was cancelled due to budgetary problem and predictable storyline of the franchise, where financial situation of Daiei Film was further cornered by producing three Daimajin films in 1966.

== Theme songs ==
All songs were written by Shoko Fujibayashi and composed by Toshihiko Sahashi.

Opening theme

- "Sing Your Heart Out"
  - Artist: Ryoko Moriyama

Closing themes
Both songs performed by Lia

- "Ashita Tenki ni Naare" (あした天気になぁれ; "Tomorrow the Weather Will Change") (jp)
  - Episodes: 1-13
- "Aruite Kaerou" (歩いて帰ろう; "Walk Back Home")
  - Episodes: 14-26
