= Zatoichi's Cane Sword =

Japanese name
- Kanji: 座頭市鉄火旅
Transcriptions
- Revised Hepburn: Zatōichi tekka-tabi
- Directed by: Kimiyoshi Yasuda
- Written by: Ryozo Kasahara
- Based on: Zatoichi by Kan Shimozawa
- Produced by: Ikuo Kubodera
- Starring: Shintaro Katsu; Shiho Fujimura; Eijirō Tōno
- Cinematography: Senkichiro Takeda
- Edited by: Toshio Taniguchi
- Music by: Ichirō Saitō
- Production company: Daiei Studios
- Release dates: 3 January 1967 (Japan); 16 August 1971 (New York)
- Running time: 93 minutes
- Country: Japan
- Language: Japanese

Zatoichi's Cane Sword (座頭市鉄火旅, Zatōichi tekka-tabi) is a 1967 Japanese chambara film directed by Kimiyoshi Yasuda and starring Shintaro Katsu as the blind masseur Zatoichi. It was originally released by the Daiei Motion Picture Company (later acquired by Kadokawa Pictures).

Zatoichi's Cane Sword is the fifteenth episode in the 26-part film series devoted to the character of Zatoichi.

== Plot ==
While travelling Zatoichi comes across a dying gangster boss called Shotaro. In a nearby town that has been overrun by gang belonging to Boss Iwagoro, Zatoichi disturbs the gangsters' gambling scam and hides away with the town's blacksmith Senzo. Senzo turns out to be the apprentice to the master swordsmith who forged Zatoichi's cane sword. Senzo spots a crack in the blade and warns that it will snap after one more kill.

At the inn where Zatoichi takes a job as a masseur, the innkeeper Gembei has taken in Shotaro's daughter Shizu and son Seikichi. Shizu wants her brother to take their father's place as the new boss and keep the evil Boss Iwagoro from taking over, but the scholarly Seikichi has no interest in the family business. During his stay at the inn Zatoichi discovers Iwagoro is in cahoots with a corrupt government official, Inspector Kuwayama.

== Cast ==
- Shintaro Katsu as Zatoichi
- Shiho Fujimura as Oshizu
- Eijirō Tōno as Senzo
- Yoshihiko Aoyama as Seikichi
- Tatsuo Endo as Boss Iwagoro
- Masumi Harukawa as Oryu
- Makoto Fujita as Umazo
- Kiyoko Suizenji as Oharu
- Masako Akeboshi as Matsu
- Fujio Suga as Kuwayama

== Production ==
- Yoshinobu Nishioka - Art director

== Reception ==
=== Critical response ===
Roger Greenspun, in a review for The New York Times, wrote that "[w]here it is quiet enough to allow Ichi his peaceful idiocyncrasies, Zato Ichi's Cane Sword is a pleasantly modest film, an amiable contrast to the fateful solemnities of the Toshiro Mifune samurai dramas. Ichi's very invulnerability makes for a certain relaxation, a few songs, a little buffoonery, and much of it to the good."
