= Sunekosuri =

Supernatural being in Japanese folklore

The sunekosuri (meaning "rub against lower legs") is a Japanese yōkai. Stories are told of it in Okayama Prefecture and is said to get in the way of people's paths as they walk.

== Mythology ==
According to the 1935 book Current Dictionary of Yōkai Nationwide (現行全国妖怪辞典) natural historian Satou Seimei they appear on nights when rain falls and rub against the crotches (space between the legs) of people who walk on roads at night. The victims have a little difficulty walking, but no other harm. According to Rin Adashino, this book is the oldest record of the sunekosuri.

According to folklore from Ibara in Nankaichi town within this city, sunekosuri would appear beside a shrine called Iryō-dō, and it would move through the space between the legs of pedestrians and would take the shape of a dog.

In Yoshii, Shitsuki District, Okayama Prefecture, there are stories of a similar spirit called sunekkorogashi (meaning "make lower legs fall over"). A legend states that it would slip into darkness at night and pull on people's legs, making them fall over. Children were made to fall over and hurt their noses.

== In Media ==
They have been given various appearances in fictional works. In Mizuki Shigeru's manga GeGeGe no Kitarō, it takes on the appearance of a cat rolled into a ball. People who claimed to have actually witnessed one often claim that "it was like a cat". Yōkai researcher Yamaguchi Binatarō claimed that this was because of Mizuki Shigeru's influence. Some netsuke resemble Mizuki's design, creating the possibility that they referred to Mizuki's design.

In the movie The Great Yokai War sunekosuri appeared as yellow and white lumps of hair with cute eyes.

In the 2018 anime adaptation of GeGeGe no Kitarō, the sunekosuri takes the appearance of a small, chubby, tabby cat, having forgotten his true form. It appears as a bakeneko creature feeding on human lifeforce, forced to leave his dwelling. While the village was thriving he could easily feed from many people and never harm anyone, but with the massive population decline in rural Japan he ended up unwillingly stealing too much lifeforce from the remaining, elderly citizens.

In the 2020 video game Nioh 2, the sunekosuri- localized as "Scampuss"- appears as a helpful yokai that looks like a chubby cat and aids the player.

In the 2026 video games Nioh 3 the sunekosuri make their reappearance as the aforementioned Scampuss from the previous entry. This time they appear in variety of colors and fur patterns.

== See also ==
- List of legendary creatures from Japan
