= Chikara Hashimoto =

Japanese baseball player and actor (1933–2017)

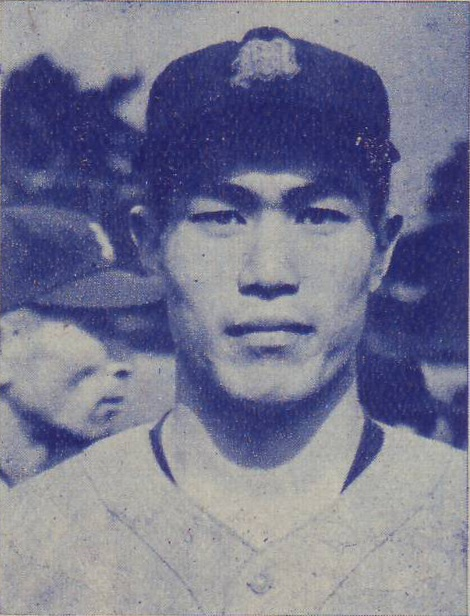
- Born: October 20, 1933; Hokkaido, Japan
- Died: October 11, 2017 (aged 83)

Teams
- Mainichi Orions, 1950s

Chikara Hashimoto (橋本 力, Hashimoto Chikara; 20 October 1933 – 11 October 2017), also erroneously called Riki Hashimoto (はしもと りき, Hashimoto Riki), was a Japanese professional baseball player and actor. Hashimoto played baseball for Mainichi Orions in the 1950s. He was forced to retire in 1958 following an injury, and then joined Daiei Studios. As an actor, he is known for his roles as Daimajin in the 1966 film trilogy and as Hiroshi Suzuki in the 1972 Bruce Lee film, Fist of Fury.

== Partial filmography ==
- San'nin no kaoyaku (1960)
- Sutekina yaro (1960)
- Ginza no dora-neko (1960)
- Ginzakko monogatari (1961)
- Tsuma wa kokuhaku suru (1961)
- The Whale God (1962)
- Ken ni kakeru (1962)
- Jigoku no shikyaku (1962)
- Yoru no haitô (1963) - Blue collar guy
- Kyojin Ôkuma Shigenobu (1963)
- Kuro no kirifuda (1964)
- Fight, Zatoichi, Fight (1964) - Inozo
- Mushuku mono (1964) - Bishamon (uncredited)
- Nemuri Kyôshirô: Mashôken (1965)
- Fukushû no kiba (1965) - Kurayami's henchman
- Kumo o yobu kôdôkan (1965)
- Daimajin (1966) - Daimajin (uncredited)
- Daimajin ikaru (1966) - Shunpei Ikenaga / Daimajin
- Gontakure (1966) - Port superintendent
- Wrath of Daimajin (1966) - Daimajin
- A Certain Killer (1967)
- Gamera vs. Viras (1968) - Doctor A
- Kaidan otoshiana (1968) - Udegawa
- Zoku hiroku onna ro (1968) - The Inspector
- Yokai Monsters: Spook Warfare (1968) - Daimon
- Shin Yotarô senki (1969) - Private First Class Hashimoto
- Yakuza Zessyō (1970) - Toyama
- Mona Riza okyo (1971)
- Zatoichi and the One-Armed Swordsman (1971) - Samurai
- Fist of Fury (1972) - Hiroshi Suzuki
- Shin heitai yakuza: Kasen (1972)
- Twinkle, Twinkle, Lucky Stars (1986) - Japanese Fighter (final film role)
