= Yokai Monsters: Along with Ghosts =

1969 film by Kimiyoshi Yasuda and Yoshiyuki Kuroda

- Theatrical release poster

Japanese name
- Kanji: 東海道お化け道中
Transcriptions
- Revised Hepburn: Tōkaidō Obake Dōchū
- Directed by: Kimiyoshi Yasuda; Yoshiyuki Kuroda
- Screenplay by: Tetsurō Yoshida
- Based on: Folk tales of Momotarō, and The Great Yokai War by Shigeru Mizuki
- Starring: Kojiro Hongo; Pepe Hozumi; Masami Burukido
- Cinematography: Hiroshi Imai
- Edited by: Toshio Taniguchi
- Music by: Chumei Watanabe
- Production company: Daiei Film
- Distributed by: Daiei International Films
- Release date: 1969
- Running time: 78 minutes
- Country: Japan
- Language: Japanese

Yokai Monsters: Along with Ghosts (Japanese: 東海道お化け道中, Hepburn: Tōkaidō Obake Dōchū; lit. The Haunted Journey Along Tokaido) is a 1969 Japanese fantasy horror film directed by Kimiyoshi Yasuda and Yoshiyuki Kuroda. It is the third in a trilogy of films produced in the late 1960s, all of which focus around traditional Japanese monsters known as yōkai.

== Plot ==
When a criminal boss Higuruma kills his rival and a witness, an old man who tried to protect a sacred site, he believes a young girl in the old man's care, Miyo, was also a witness and escaped with the evidence of his criminal activity. Higuruma and his men hunt down Miyo as she tries to find her missing father with the help of a swordsman, Hyakasuro, while the boss and his men are haunted by the curse of the yokai of the land they desecrated.

== Release ==
Yokai Monsters: Along with Ghosts was released in Japan on March 21, 1969. It was released in the United States by Daiei International Films with English subtitles in 1969. The film set for a 4K DVD and Blu-ray release by Kadokawa in August 18. The Blu-ray will also be packaged with Yokai Monsters: 100 Monsters and Yokai Monsters: Spook Warfare in a box set due on September 24.

== Bibliography ==
- Galbraith IV, Stuart (1996). The Japanese Filmography: 1900 through 1994. McFarland. ISBN 0786400323.
- Papp, Zilia (2009-11-11). "Monsters at War: The Great Yōkai Wars, 1968-2005". Mechademia. 4 (War/Time): 225–239. doi:10.1353/mec.0.0073. JSTOR 41510938. S2CID 52229518.
