= Daimajin (film) =

- Theatrical release poster
- Directed by: Kimiyoshi Yasuda
- Screenplay by: Tetsuro Yoshida
- Produced by: Masaichi Nagata
- Starring: Miwa Takada; Yoshihiko Aoyama; Jun Fujimaki; Ryutaro Gomi
- Cinematography: Fujio Morita
- Edited by: Hiroshi Yamada
- Music by: Akira Ifukube
- Production company: Daiei Film
- Distributed by: Daiei Film
- Release date: April 17, 1966 (Japan)
- Running time: 84 minutes
- Country: Japan
- Language: Japanese
- Budget: ¥60 million

Daimajin (Japanese: 大魔神, Hepburn: Daimajin; lit. 'Giant Demon God') is a 1966 Japanese tokusatsu film (Note: Per Performing Arts (1966; vol. 8): "[Daiei] released a tokusatsu double-feature, Gamera vs. Barugon and Daimajin; the latter movie does not depict a kaiju but had similar themes and was another big hit.") directed by Kimiyoshi Yasuda. Produced and distributed by Daiei Film, it is the first film in the Daimajin trilogy. The plot centers around a wrathful spirit (the eponymous Daimajin) sealed inside an ancient statue, which comes to life to help the surviving children of the slain lord of Tanba Province (Miwa Takada and Yoshihiko Aoyama).

== Plot ==
In a remote village in the province of Tanba, a household of peasants cowers during a series of earth tremors that are interpreted as the escape attempts of Arakatsuma (阿羅羯磨), also known as Daimajin, a violent divine spirit said to be trapped within the nearby mountain held in fear and reverence by the locals.

As the village gathers at the local shrine to perform an ancient ritual to pacify Daimajin, Ōdate Samanosuke (Ryūtarō Gomi), chamberlain to the local lord Hanabusa Tadakiyo (Ryūzō Shimada), stages a coup d'état. He and his henchmen slaughter Hanabusa and his wife, but their son and daughter escape, aided by the heroic samurai Kogenta (Jun Fujimaki). Back at the shrine, Samanosuke's men break up the ceremony, forbidding all such gatherings in the future. The elderly priestess, Shinobu (Otome Tsukimiya), issues a dire warning, but the men ignore her.

Kogenta takes the two children to his aunt Shinobu's house. The priestess takes them up the mountain, into forbidden territory, where a gigantic stone idol of the mountain god who had sealed Daimajin long ago stands half-buried atop a waterfall. Near this idol is an ancient temple - safe as only Shinobu knows of its existence.

The children grow to adulthood. The son, Tadafumi (Yoshihiko Aoyama) reaches his 18th birthday. The years have been miserable for the villagers. Samanosuke is a brutal leader (in one scene, he gouges out an old woman's eye with a red-hot iron hook) who is using every man in the starving village as slave labor. The place is ripe for revolution, and surviving Hanabusa retainers are starting to return.

Kogenta journeys to the village to try to gather the old retainers but gets himself captured. A boy, Take-bō, gets word to Tadafumi and his sister, Kozasa (Miwa Takada) that their friend is a prisoner. Tadafumi tries to rescue him, only to discover it is a trap. With both awaiting executions, Shinobu tries to talk to the tyrant, warning him that the god of the mountain's curse will befall him should he continue his evildoing ways. Samanosuke, refusing to heed Shinobu's words, kills her and orders the idol demolished. With her dying breath, Shinobu curses Samanosuke to die a harsh, merciless death and declares that if he attempts to destroy the idol, the wrathful Arakatsuma sealed inside it will come out.

The crew that travels up the mountain to smash the idol accidentally discovers Kozasa and Take-bō and forces them to take them to the statue. The soldiers bring out an enormous chisel and proceed to hammer it into the idol's head, they stop when they see blood beginning to drip from it. Horrified, the men attempt to flee, but the earth cracks open and swallows them.

Kozasa begs the god of the mountain to save her brother and Kogenta and punish the wicked Samanosuke. At the fortress, Tadafumi and Kogenta are tied to large crosses, awaiting their fates. Kozasa offers her life to the god and attempts to throw herself over the nearby waterfall, but the rock and earth covering the lower half of the idol fall away, and it comes to life. As it walks out into the clearing, Kozasa prostrates herself before it; the idol, animated by the reawakened Daimajin Arakatsuma, assumes a terrifying appearance and goes to Samanosuke's stronghold.

Daimajin rescues both Kogenta and Tadafumi and proceeds to utterly destroy the fortress. After impaling Samanosuke with the chisel on its forehead, Daimajin now turns its wrath upon everyone in sight. Take-bō unsuccessfully begs Daimajin to stop; as the boy was about to get trampled on by the idol, Kozasa steps in and saves him. Kozasa tearfully pleads with Daimajin to cease its rampage, letting her tears fall on its stone feet. Its anger now quelled, Daimajin's spirit leaves the idol, restoring it to its former appearance before it collapses into a heap of rubble.

== Cast ==
- Miwa Takada as Hanabusa Kozasa (花房小笹)
- Masako Morishita as Young Kozasa
- Yoshihiko Aoyama as Hanabusa Tadafumi (青山良彦)
- Hideki Ninomiya as Young Tadafumi
- Jun Fujimaki as Sarumaru Kogenta (猿丸小源太)
- Otome Tsukimiya as Shinobu (信夫)
- Ryūtarō Gomi as Ōdate Samanosuke (大舘左馬之助)
- Ryūzō Shimada as Hanabusa Tadakiyo (花房忠清)
- Tatsuo Endō as Inugami Gunjūrō (犬上軍十郎)
- Saburō Date as Chūma Ippei (中馬逸平)
- Shosaku Sugiyama as Kajiura Yūsuke (梶浦有助)
- Hideo Kuroki as Harada Magojūrō (原田孫十郎)
- Shizuhiro Izoguchi as Take-bō (竹坊) aka The Boy
- Gen Kimura as Mosuke (茂助), Take-bō's father
- Keiko Kayama as Haruno (悠乃)
- Eigorō Onoe as Gosaku (吾作)
- Chikara Hashimoto as Daimajin (uncredited)

== Production ==
The proposal for this film was submitted to Daiei headquarters in 1965 at the 124th planning meeting in the first week of November. Hisashi Okuda, who was the deputy director of planning, decided to use the golem legend depicted in the Czechoslovak movie Le Golem (1936) and utilize the special effects technology of Daiei Kyoto Studio. The cinematographer on Daimajin is sometimes credited to Yoshiyuki Kuroda and sometimes to Fujio Morita.

== Release ==
=== Theatrical ===
Daimajin was released theatrically in Japan on April 17, 1966, as a double feature with Gamera vs. Barugon. The film did not receive a theatrical release in the United States, instead being released directly to television by American International Television in 1968 under the title Majin the Monster of Terror.

== Home media ==
Mill Creek released the trilogy on Blu-ray in 2012, with each film including a half-hour interview with Fujio Morita discussing the making of that film.

Boutique label Arrow Video released the trilogy in 2021, in a Blu-Ray set featuring new commentaries on all three films and other special features.

== Bibliography ==
- Galbraith IV, Stuart (1994). Japanese Science Fiction, Fantasy and Horror Films. McFarland. ISBN 0899508537.
- Fischer, Dennis (2011). Science Fiction Film Directors, 1895-1998. McFarland. ISBN 9780786485055.
