= The Young Lord =

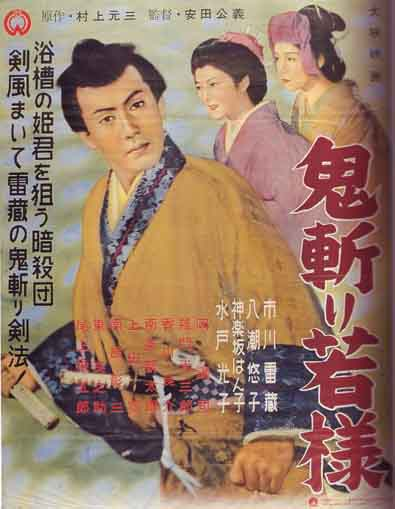
- Japanese movie poster
- Directed by: Kimiyoshi Yasuda
- Produced by: Daiei
- Release date: April 19, 1955
- Running time: 83 minutes
- Country: Japan
- Language: Japanese

The Young Lord (鬼斬り若様, Onikiri Wakasama) is a 1955 black-and-white Japanese film directed by Kimiyoshi Yasuda.

== Cast ==
- Ichikawa Raizō VIII
