= The Dancer and Two Warriors =

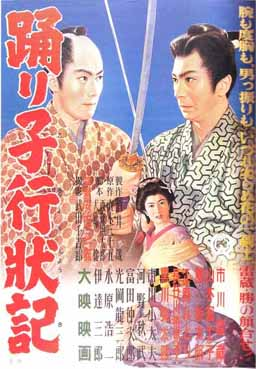
- Japanese movie poster
- Directed by: Kimiyoshi Yasuda
- Distributed by: Daiei Film
- Release date: June 26, 1955
- Running time: 89 minutes
- Country: Japan
- Language: Japanese

The Dancer and Two Warriors (踊り子行状記, Odoriko Gyōjōki) is a 1955 black-and-white Japanese film directed by Kimiyoshi Yasuda.

== Cast ==
- Ichikawa Raizō VIII
- Shintaro Katsu
