= Kimiyoshi Yasuda =

Japanese film director (1911–1983)

- 安田公義
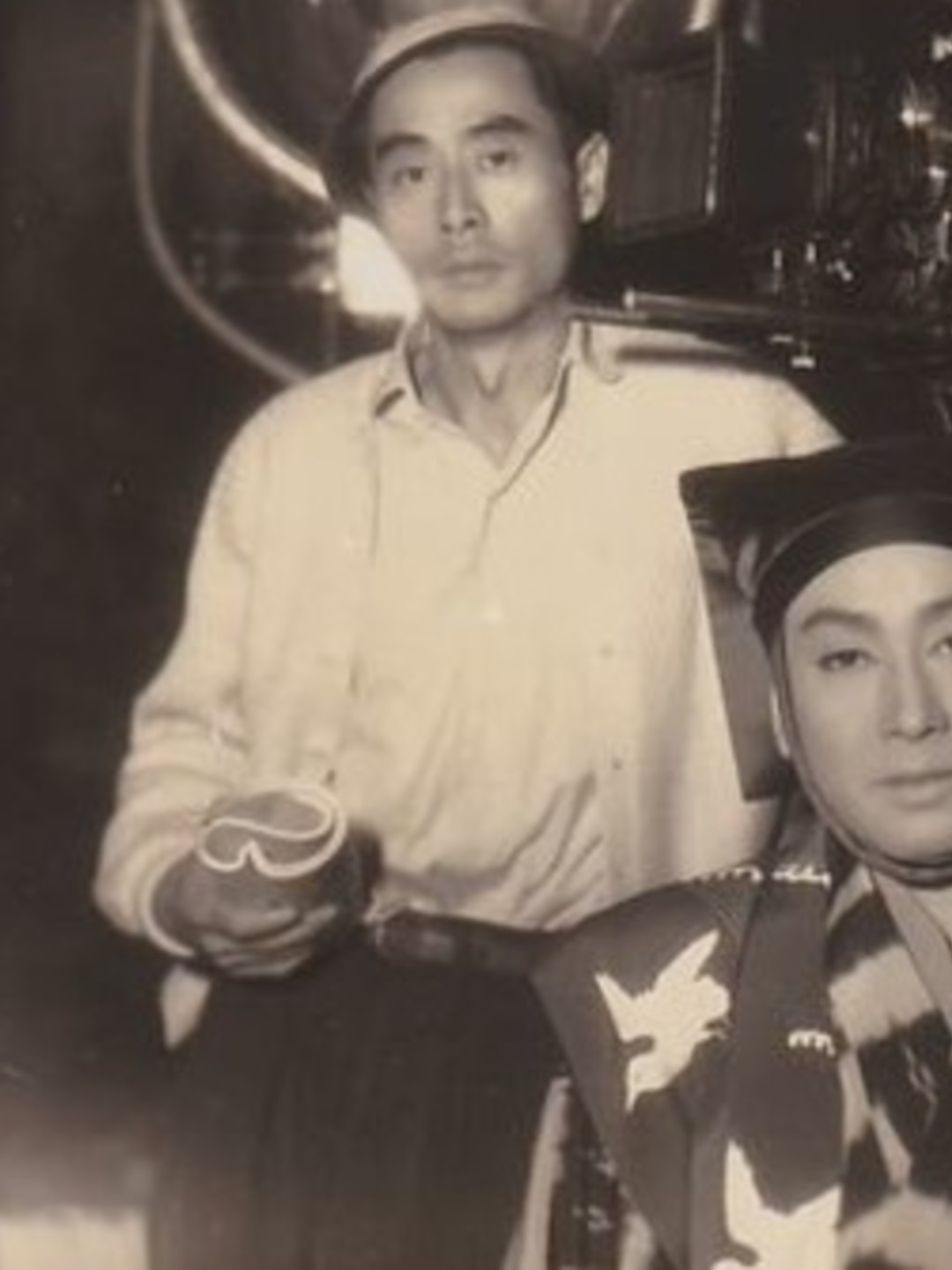
- Yasuda in 1952
- Born: February 15, 1911; Tokyo, Japan
- Died: July 26, 1983 (aged 72); Japan
- Years active: 1935-1979

Kimiyoshi Yasuda (安田公義, Yasuda Kimiyoshi) (born February 15, 1911 Tokyo, Japan, died July 26, 1983) was a Japanese film director from the 1930s to 1970s. He directed six films about Zatoichi, the Blind Swordsman.

He signed with Nikkatsu Kyoto studio as an assistant director and started working as an assistant director under Sadao Yamanaka and Hiroshi Inagaki etc. He made his directorial debut with Ouma wa Nanajyunana-mangoku in 1944.

== Filmography ==
=== Assistant director ===
- The Million Ryo Pot (1935)

=== Director ===
- The Young Swordsman (潮出来島 美男剣法 Itako Dejima Binan Kenpo) (1954)
- The Dancer and Two Warriors (踊り子行状記 Odoriko Gyōjōki) (1955)
- The Young Lord (鬼斬り若様 Onikiri Wakasama) (1955)
- Suzunosuke Akado: Defeat the Demon-Faced Gang (1957)
- Fighting Letter for 29 People 29-nin no Kenka-jō (二十九人の喧嘩状, Nijūkunin no kenkajō) (1957)
- Suzunosuke Akado: The Vacuum Slash of Asuka (1957)
- Suzunosuke Akado: The One-Legged Demon (1957)
- (花太郎呪文 Hanataro Jumon ) (1958)
- Kaidan Kasane-ga-fuchi (1960) not shown in U.S. (remade in 1970 as The Masseur's Curse )
- Zatoichi on the Road (座頭市喧嘩旅 Zatōichi kenka-tabi) (1963)
- Adventures of Zatoichi (座頭市関所破り Zatōichi sekisho-yaburi) (1964)
- Daimajin (1966)
- Zatoichi's Cane Sword (座頭市鉄火旅 Zatōichi tekka-tabi) (1967)
- Yokai Monsters: 100 Monsters (妖怪百物語) (1968)
- Zatoichi and the Fugitives (座頭市果し状 Zatōichi hatashijō) (1968)
- Lady Sazen and the Drenched Swallow Sword (女左膳 濡れ燕片手斬り On'na hidarizen nuretsubame katate kiri) (1969)
- Yokai Monsters: Along with Ghosts (1969) [with Yoshiyuki Kuroda]
- The Masseur's Curse (1970) the 3rd version of Kaidan Kasane-ga-fuchi
- Zatoichi and the One Armed Swordsman (新座頭市・破れ！唐人剣 Shin Zatōichi: Yabure! Tōjin-ken) (1971)
- Zatoichi's Conspiracy (新座頭市物語・笠間の血祭り Shin Zatōichi monogatari: Kasama no chimatsuri) (1973)

=== Television ===
- Kogarashi Monjirō (TV series) (1972-73)
- Nemuri Kyōshirō (TV series) (1972-73) ep,3,9)
- Oshizamurai Kiichihōgan (TV series) (1973-74 ep,2,4,16,23)
- Tsūkai! Kōchiyama Sōshun (TV series) (1975-76 ep,16,24)
