= Shōjō =

Japanese folkloric ape-like or humanoid creature

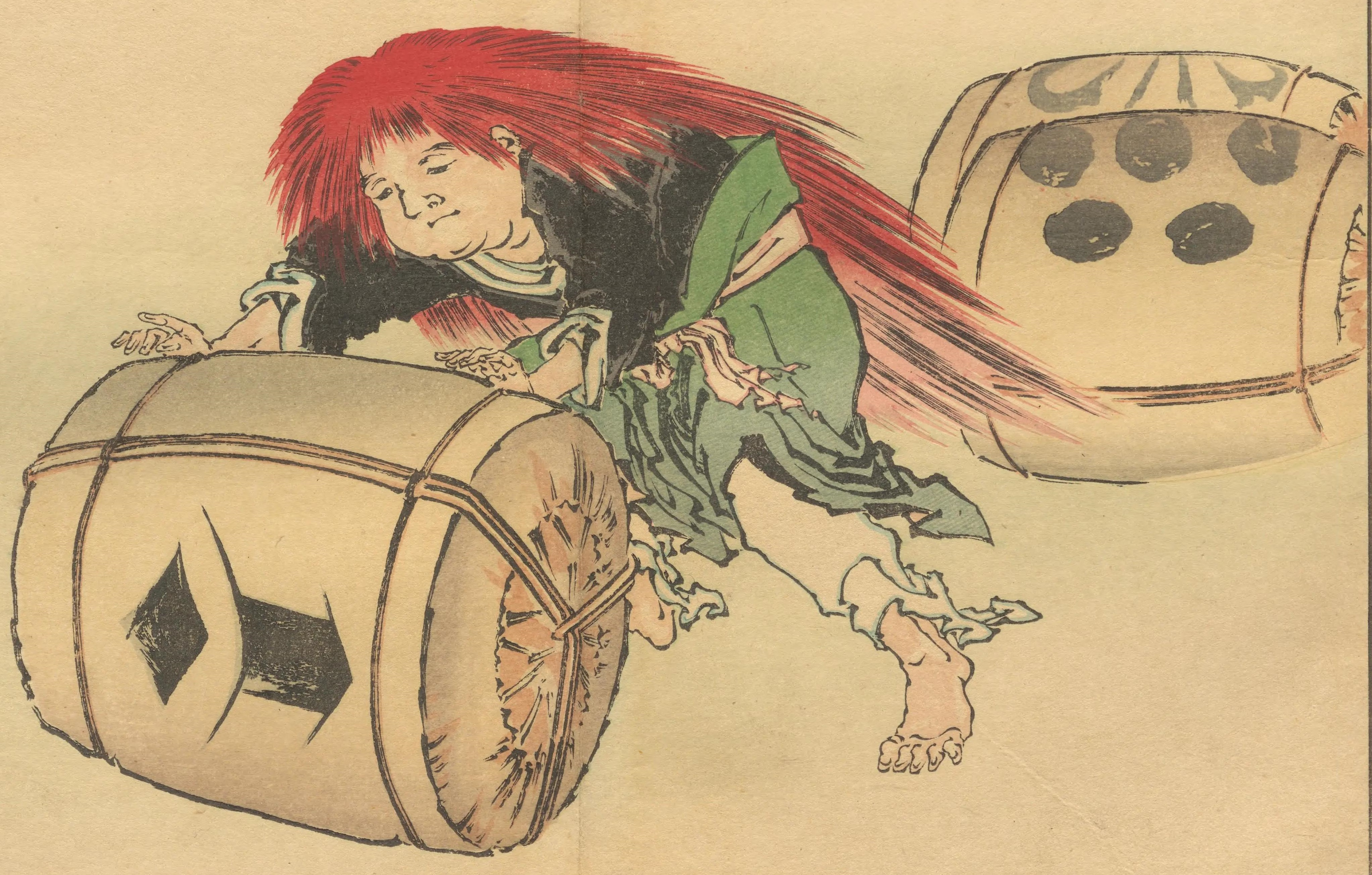
A shōjō rolling a komodaru ( barrel of sake). —from Katsushika shinsō gafu (1890) by Ichikawa Kansai (市川甘斎 aka Ichikawa Raijirō after Katsushika Hokusai.

A shōjō (猩々 or 猩猩) is the Japanese reading of Chinese xing-xing (猩猩) or its older form sheng sheng (狌狌, translated as "live-lively"), which is a mythical ape, though it has been tentatively identified as an (unknown) orangutan species. (Note: The problem is that xing-xing were supposedly caught in places like Vietnam (accord. to Chinese sources), while all known species of orangutan occur in Borneo or other islands of Indonesia, not on the Chinese or Southeast Asian mainland.)

Some commentators have regarded the shōjō sea spirit with a red face and hair and a fondness for alcohol as part of native Japanese folklore. However, shōjō as sea-dwelling spirit was a fictional setting in the Noh play Shōjō, a possible embellishment of the Shan Hai Jing ("Classic of Mountains and Seas") stating this orangutan could be found on a particular seaside mountain. And liquor-drinking was always associated with this beast in China since antiquity.

== Nomenclature ==
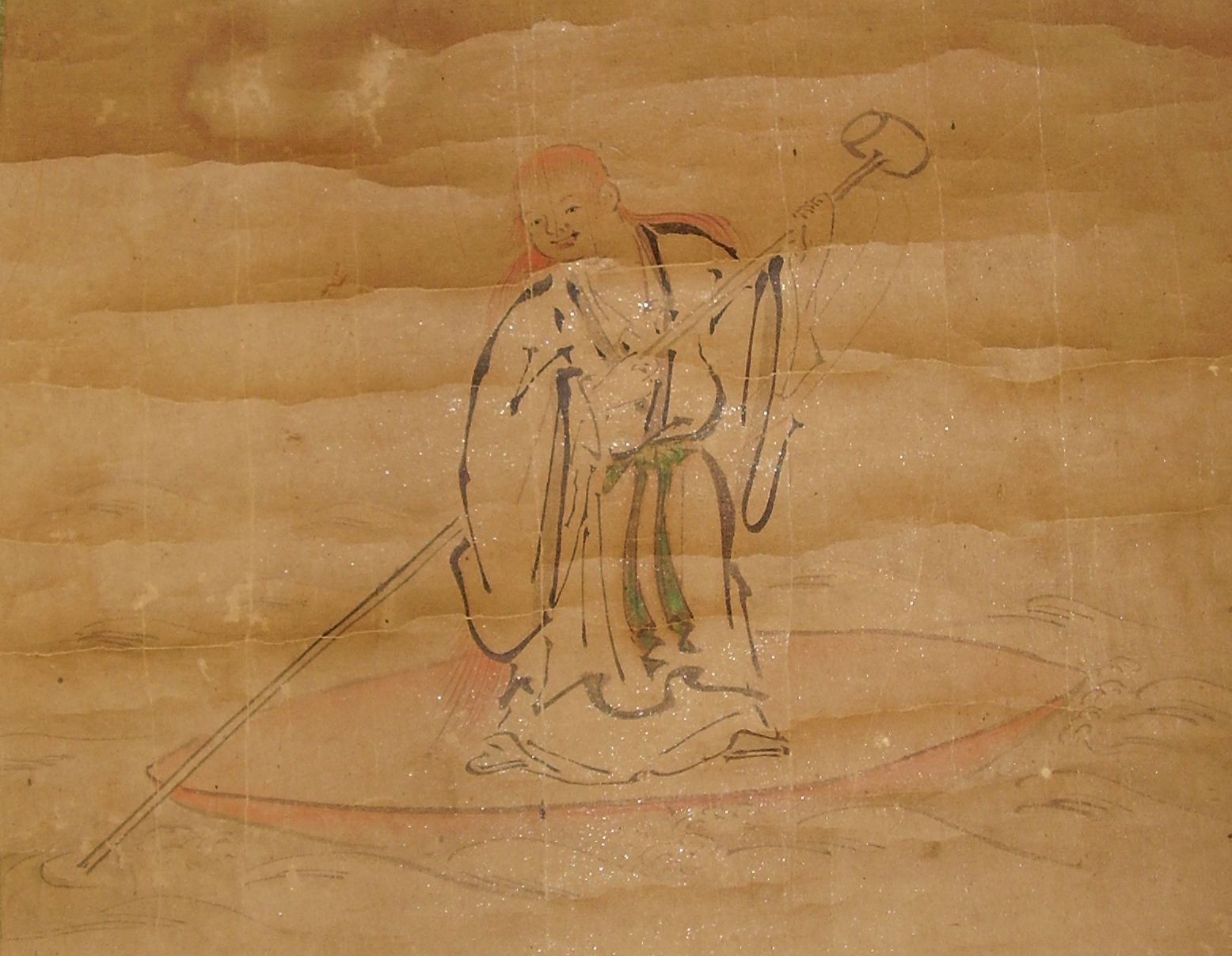
A shōjō standing on a giant sake cup, and using a long-handled sake ladle to pole through a sea of water or sake —Detail from a whimsical Edo-period painting.

The Chinese characters are also a Japanese (and Chinese) word for orangutan, and can also be used in Japanese to refer to someone who is particularly fond of alcohol.

A Noh mask called the shōjō exists (cf. §Noh); also, in Kabuki, a type of stage makeup (kumadori) is called the shōjō.

== Development of lore ==
The shōjō has been represented as a sea spirit with a red face and hair and a fondness for alcohol as part of Japanese folktale tradition.

It has sometimes been misconceived as purely native Japanese folklore and superstition, particularly by commentators of the netsuke craft art, since the shōjō is a popular subject for these carvings. Though the conception of the shōjō as an alcohol-loving fairy living in the sea may have passed into folklore, it has its antecedent in medieval Noh play bearing the title Shōjō, set in Ancient China, which in turn derives from the Chinese counterpart, xingxing:

There is no question whatsoever that shōjō's love of liquor derives from the xingxing of Chinese literature, and a number of ancient sources can be listed. (Note: On the tract where Huainanzi, Lecture 13. Fanlun (氾論訓 "Boundless Discourses") states that xingxing (orangutan) "knows the past but does not know the future 猩猩知往而不知来", and Gao You (高誘)'s annotation (212 AD) here provides that "The xingxing is the name of a beast in the north (recté 'south'), with a human face and beastly body of yellow color. [Confucius] Book of Rites says the xingxing is able to speak yet not separate from beasts and birds, seems to walk and run like humans, knows the names of humans, and has a taste for liquor 猩猩北方獣名、人面獣身黄色、禮記曰、猩猩能言不離禽獣、見人往走、則知人姓字、又嗜酒".) The aspect of dwelling in the sea is a uniquely Japanese adaptation, but it might have been inspired by the statement in the Shan Hai Jing that the creature is found on a southern mountain bordering the sea.

== Xingxing ==
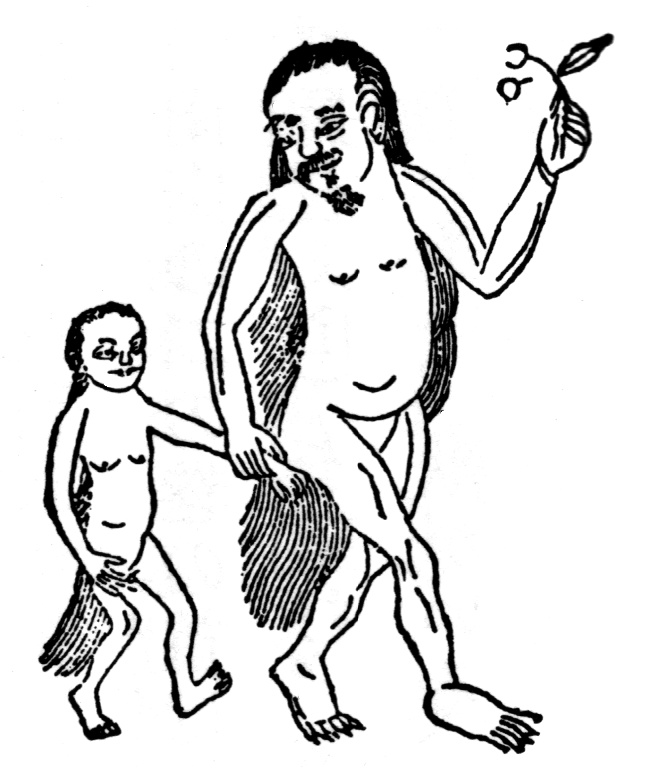
A drawing of a shēng shēng father and child from a 1596 edition of the Shan Hai Jing.

The xingxing (xīng xīng; 猩猩) written shengsheng (shēng shēng; 狌狌) in older writings is found in a number of pieces of Chinese literature, dating back to several centuries B.C.

=== Shan hai jing ===
The shengsheng or xingxing (狌狌), also given the English-translated name of "live-lively" are mentioned in three passages of the Shan Hai Jing ("Classic of Mountains and Seas").

According to Book One, or Classic of the Southern Mountains the shengsheng resembles a yu (禺) or long-tailed monkey, but has white ears. It is said to crouch while walking, but to be able to run like humans, and eating it imparts quick-running ability. (Note: Birrel tr. "There is an animal on the mountain which looks like a long-tailed ape, but it has white ears. It crouches as it moves along and it runs like a human. Its name is the live-lively. If you eat it, you'll be a good runner".) It is said to inhabit Mount Zhaoyao 招摇之山 or "Mt. Raiseshake", which is the first peak of Queshan 鵲山 or Mount Magpie [range].

Elsewhere:

Drift Forest is 300 leagues square. It lies east of the land of the live-lively apes. The live-lively apes know the names of humans. These animals are like hogs, but they have a human face.

— Book Ten--The Classic of Regions Within the Seas: The South (p. 135)

There is a green animal with a human face. Its name is live-lively.

— Book Eighteen--The Classic of Regions Within the Seas (p. 192)

The Chinese character Birrell translates as "green" (青, qīng) is also used to refer to colors that in English would be considered "blue," (see Distinguishing blue from green in language) and that illustrator Sun Xiao-qin (孫暁琴, Sūn Xiǎo-qín), in Illustrated Classics: Classic of Mountains and Seas (经典图读山海经, Jīng Diǎn Tú Dú Shān Hǎi Jīng) chose to portray the xīng xīng from this same passage as having blue fur.

=== Bencao Gangmu ===
The xingxing (猩猩) is mentioned in the Bencao Gangmu ("Compendium of Materia Medica", 1596), and identified as referring to the orangutan by modern editors/translators. The work's compiler Li Shizhen remarked that xing-xing (猩猩) was formerly written sheng sheng (狌狌), hence, Unschuld emends the authentic pronunciation of "猩猩" to be "sheng sheng". Curiously, Strassberg did the opposite, and rendered "狌狌" as xingxing.

The Bencao Gangmu describes it as resembling a dog or rhesus macaque (獼猴), having golden fur like a gibbon (yuan; 猨), and white ears like a pig.

It cites Ruan Qian (阮汧) from the Tang dynasty period regarding the method the Vietnamese locals in Fengxi (封溪) county used to capture the xingxing. They would leave straw sandals and liquor by the roadside to lure them; the creatures examine these goods but go away at first, but they return to try on the sandals and drink the wine, at which point they can be captured. When it comes time for the humans to butcher one of them for food, they would push the fattest one among them forward, and weep. (Note: "lower-alpha")

== Japanese literature and art ==
=== Noh play ===
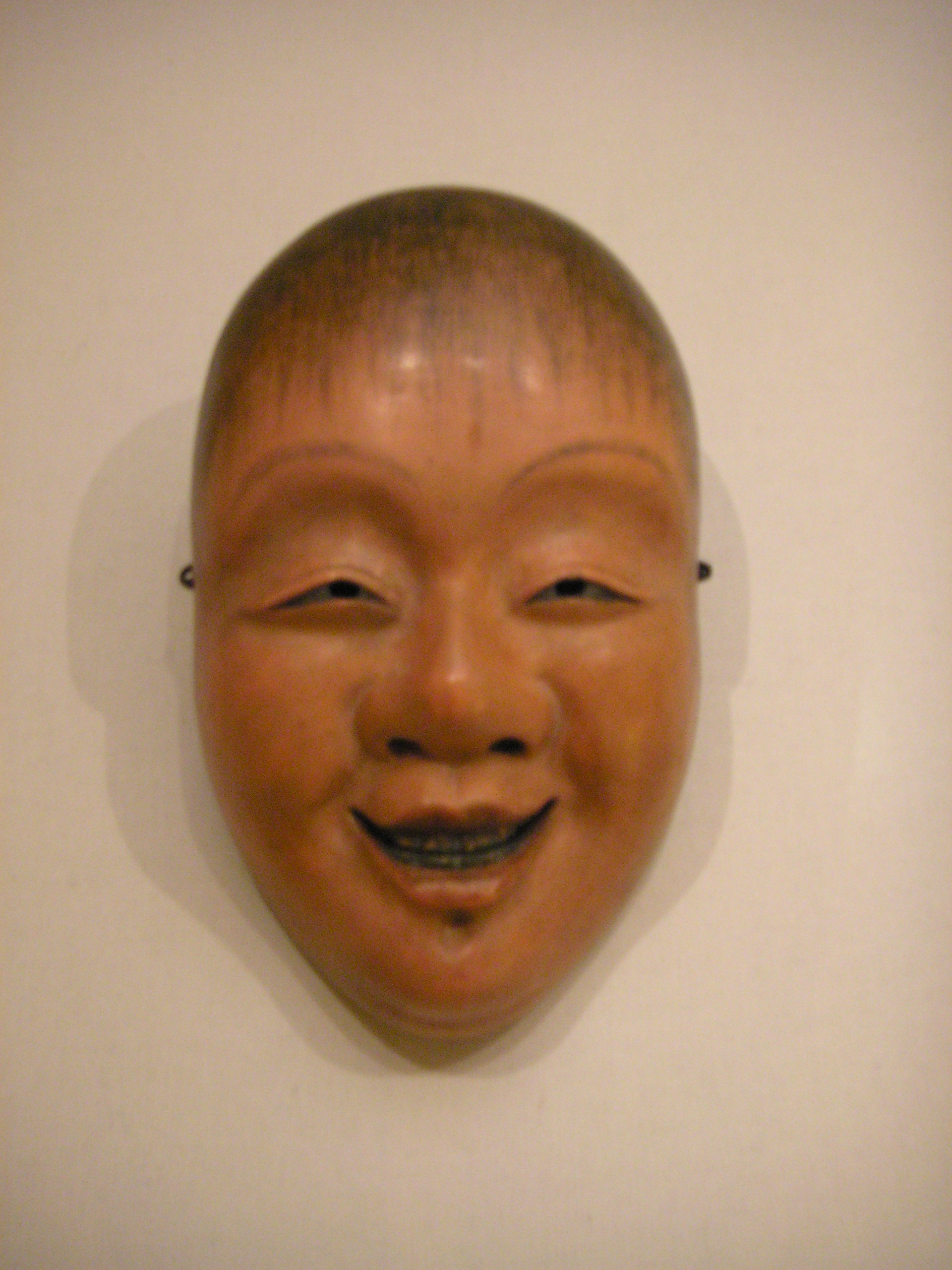
A Noh mask of the shōjō.

The Kyōgen-influenced Noh play shōjō is set in Ancient China, specifically on the banks of the Xunyang River (潯陽; present-day Jiujiang) in Morokoshi (唐土; present-day Jiangxi Province). (Note: Wade-Giles romanization is Hsün-yang (潯陽) but this has been transcribed as "Hsin-yang River". "Hsin-yang, now called Kiukiang", i.e., Jiujiang is also mentioned alongside shōjō in Chikamatsu Monzaemon's puppet play The Battles of Coxinga.)

==== Plotline ====
A man is instructed to sell wine (sake) at the market to become wealthy. The protagonist (shite) shōjō disguised as a human buys from him in large quantity, but his face never becomes flushed despite the heavy drinking. The sake-seller who has turned wealthy asked his great patron for his identity, and the shōjō reveals to him he is a spirit living in the sea.

The sake seller seeks out the spirit at an estuary by the seaside. The shōjō appears in its true form, drinks the sake, getting drunk and dancing ecstatically, then rewarding the sake seller by making his sake vat perpetually refill itself.

==== Costume ====
The Shōjō Noh mask with a red tinge on its face, it is worn by the lead (nochishite) playing its part of the shōjō, and used exclusively for this lead role, but nowhere else. (Note: However, this has also been worn to portray a red-faced ghost of a youth.) The costume of the Shōjō follows an overall red-color theme, a big red wig, and red clothing.

==== Variant ====
The variant to the Noh play, known by the title Shōjō midare or simply Midare (乱; 'Disorder') is actually only involves alternate choreography or staging (kogaki, in Noh jargon). The usual chū-no-mai (中之舞; 'medium dance') gets replaced with a special midare dance during the ha 3 dan (破三段; '3rd developmental act'). (Note: The Noh is supposed to consist of five acts or dan, obeying the Jo-ha-kyū principle: 1 introductory jo act, 3 developmental ha acts, and 1 climactic kyū act.)

=== Folk art ===
The Shōjō doll was sometimes displayed alongside the red Daruma doll, red paper gohei, etc. on an altar to the Hōsō-gami (疱瘡神) during the Edo Period. The Shōjō doll was a hariko (papier-mâché) like the daruma, and the industry for manufacture is said to date to the c. 1700s or earlier (Genroku era). It was considered a lucky item (engimono), placed on the hearth (kamado), and was supposed to contract the pox in place of the family.

The shōjō has also been a popular subject for the Nara ningyō, which is a type of wood-carved doll that is color-painted.

=== Wakan sansai zue ===
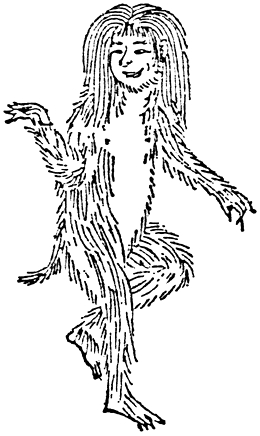
A picture of a shōjō from the Wakan Sansai Zue from the early 1700s.

Terashima Ryōan's encyclopedia Wakan sansai zue (1712) included and entry for "shōjō", with illustration (cf. fig. right). The caption was accompanied by the Chinese pronunciation rendered in katakana (suin suin スインスイン), but also claims a Japanese name shōjō (written 象掌, lit. "elephant palm"). It is clear the entry draws from Chinese sources, especially the Bencao Gangmu, and its prefacing remarks argues that the beast is actually yellow-furred (as the Bencao Gangmu states), rather being red color as has been believed according to popular notions in Japan.

The opening text proper states that the shōjō is known to occur in the mountains and valleys, in the land of the Ailauyi (Chinese: 哀牢夷, a people in western Yunnan) and "Fengxi xian" (封溪縣 county) in Jiaozhi (交趾, present-day Northern Vietnam), but the beast occurring in Fengxi, Vietnam was already given in the Bencao Gangmu, as aforementioned. And the local Vietnamese strategy of leaving straw sandals (zōri) and wine (sake) in order to lure the orangutan for capture, is also taken almost verbatim from the Chinese source.

=== Folklore ===
==== White sake ====
"Shōjō" by the sea, drinking sake, from a 1908 illustration of "White Sake," a Japanese folktale."

A group of shōjō as sake-loving sea spirits are featured in a Japanese folktale entitled "White saké" published by Richard Gordon Smith (1908). It occurs in an anthology which, folklorist A. R. Wright was convinced, faithfully recorded tales substantially as they were told by the oral sources, whether "fishermen, peasants, priests, or others".

A summary is as follows: A gravely sick man had a dying wish to drink sake. His son searched near Mount Fuji and met the red shōjō, who were having a drinking party on the beach. The shōjō gave him some sake after listening to his plea. Since the sake revived the dying father, the son went back to the spirit to get more sake each day for five days. A greedy neighbor who also wanted the sake became sick after drinking it. He forced the son to take him to the shōjō to get the good sake. The shōjō explained that as his heart wasn't pure, the sacred sake would not have life-restoring benefits, but instead had poisoned the neighbor. The neighbor repented, and the shōjō gave him some medicine to cure him. The father and the neighbor brewed white sake together.

== Popular culture ==
Several plants and animals have shōjō in their names for their bright, reddish-orange color. Examples include several Japanese maple trees, one of them named shōjō-no-mai or "dancing red-faced monkey" and another named shōjō nomura or "beautiful red-faced monkey." Certain bright reddish-orange dragonflies are named shōjō tonbo (猩猩蜻蛉), meaning "red-faced dragonfly." Other names with shōjō refer to real or fancied connections to sake, like the fly shōjō bae (猩猩蠅) that tends to swarm around open saké.

In Hayao Miyazaki's animated film Princess Mononoke, talking, ape-like creatures struggling to protect the forest from human destruction by planting trees are identified as shōjō.

Shōjō appeared in a 2005 Japanese film The Great Yokai War.

The Japanese artist Kawanabe Kyōsai, who was also known for his heavy drinking and eccentric behavior, humorously referred to himself as a shōjō.

The March 30, 2012, episode of the television series Supernatural, "Party on, Garth", features a shōjō, although this shōjō appears to have features more associated with the onryō.

== See also ==
- Inari
- Kami
- List of legendary creatures from Japan
- Yōkai
