= Shōkera =

Japanese yōkai

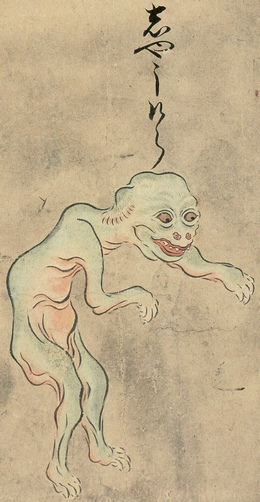
"Shōkera" from the Hyakkai Zukan by Sawaki Suushi

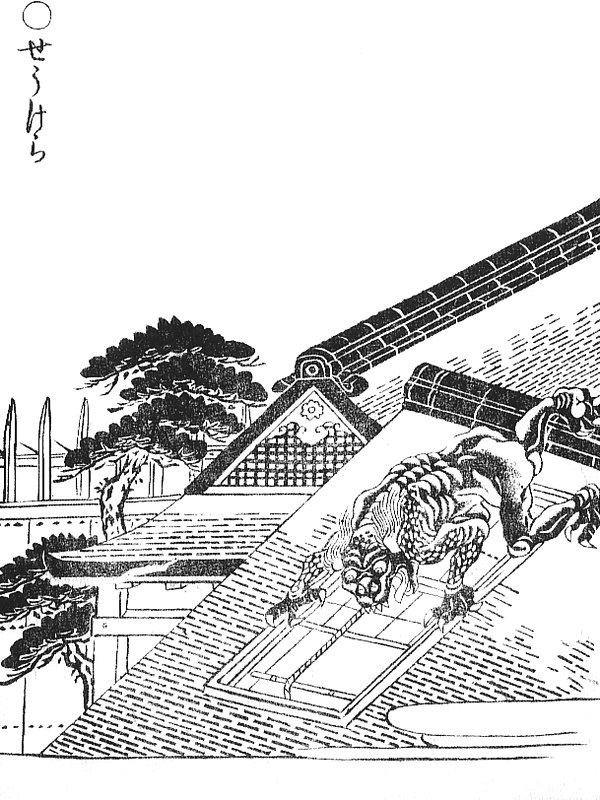
"Shōkera" from the Gazu Hyakki Yagyō by Toriyama Sekien

The Shōkera (しょうけら; lit. Mole Cricket Spirit) is a Japanese yōkai found in Edo Period yōkai emaki such as, the Hyakkai Zukan and the Gazu Hyakki Yagyō. They can also be written しゃうけら, せうけら, as well as 精螻蛄.

== Concept ==
In the Hyakkai Zukan, Gazu Hyakki Yagyō etc., they appear only in pictures with no explanatory text, so what kind of yōkai they are is a matter of speculation. In folk religion, there is a custom called the "shōkera" in the Kōshin-Machi where, due to a belief in an insect called Three Corpses inside the body that on the Kōshin night would rise to the skies and report that person's crimes to the Ten-Tei (heavenly god) resulting in the Ten-Tei taking that person's life, people would spend the night without sleeping so that the Three Corpses would not leave the body on Kōshin night. It is said that those who then proceed to quickly sleep during the day would receive some damage, and it is said that chanting "Is the shōkera still in the gut? At my lodging, will I not sleep? Will I sleep? If I don't sleep" (しょうけらはわたとてまたか我宿へねぬぞたかぞねたかぞねぬば, "shōkera wa wata tote mata ka waga yado e nenuzotaka zo netaka zo nenuba") would ward off this harm, so from this, it can be seen that the shōkera of Kōshin-Machi is a yōkai that causes harm to people.

Also, in the writing Kōshinden (庚申伝) from the Genroku years, there is the passage "shōkera is an insect, and said in one theory to be the Three Corpses" (ショウキラハ虫ノコト也、一説三尸ノコトト云), so there is also the interpretation that shōkera refers to the Three Corpses, and it is also said that they are the personification of the three corpses or that their depiction was modeled after the Three Corpse's middle corpse, which took on the form of a beast.

The Gazu Hyakki Yagyō by Toriyama Sekien depicts a shōkera looking in through the skylight of a house's roof. Yōkai-related literature starting in Shōwa and Heisei began to give the interpretation that this is surveillance to see whether people are following the rules of Kōshin-Machi day, and it is supposed that the shōkera would give a punishment by three fingers with sharp nails on those who break the rule.

== See also ==
- List of legendary creatures from Japan
