= Yoshiyuki Kuroda =

Japanese film director

- 黒田 義之
- Born: March 4, 1928; Matsuyama, Ehime, Japan
- Died: January 22, 2015 (aged 86)
- Occupation(s): Director, special effects director, screenwriter
- Years active: 1956–1999

Yoshiyuki Kuroda (Japanese: 黒田 義之, Hepburn: Kuroda Yoshiyuki, March 4, 1928 – January 22, 2015) was a Japanese filmmaker and special effects director responsible for many Japanese science-fiction films and television shows.

== Early life ==
Kuroda was born on March 4, 1928, in Matsuyama, Ehime, in his youth Kuroda's family moved to Kyoto. Kuroda wanted to be a child actor and was classmates with cinematographer Fujio Morita at Kyoto Municipal Tahata Elementary School.

== Selected works ==
=== Director ===
- Yokai Monsters: Spook Warfare (1968)
- Yokai Monsters: Along with Ghosts (1969) [with Kimiyoshi Yasuda]
- The Invisible Swordsman (1970)
- Mirrorman (1971–72)
- Oshizamurai Kiichihōgan (1973–74)
- Lone Wolf and Cub: White Heaven in Hell (1974)
- Monkey (1978–80)
- Shadow Warriors (1980–85)
- Kyotaro Nishimura's Travel Mystery: the Mysteries of Ghost Ship (1980)
- Shin Hissatsu Shigotonin (1981–82)
- Fangs of Darkness: Vengeance (1982)

=== Assistant director ===
- Fighting Birds (1956)
- Sleepy Eyes of Death (1964)
- Monkey (1978–80)

=== Director of special effects ===
- Daimajin (1966)
- Return of Daimajin (1966)
- Daimajin Strikes Again (1966)
- The Invisible Swordsman (1970)

=== Assistant special effects director ===
- Nichiren to Mōko Daishūrai (1958)
- Buddha (1961)

== Bibliography ==
- Galbraith IV, Stuart (2008). The Toho Studios Story: A History and Complete Filmography. Scarecrow Press. ISBN 978-1461673743.
