= Ōkubi =

Japanese mythological giant heads that appear in the sky before disaster

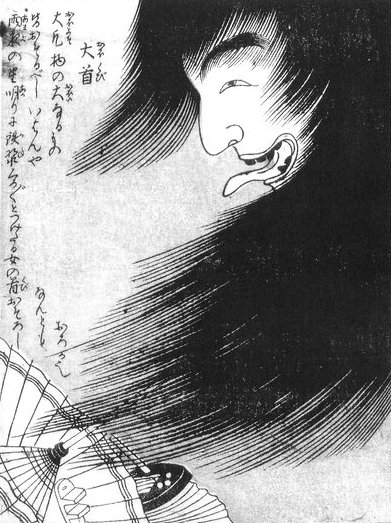
The ōkubi as illustrated by Toriyama Sekien.

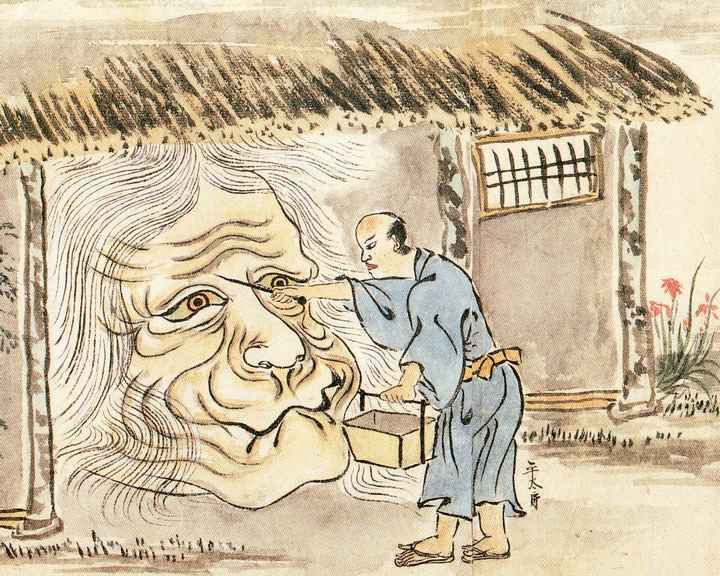
The "Ōkubi" from "Tōtei Bukkairoku"

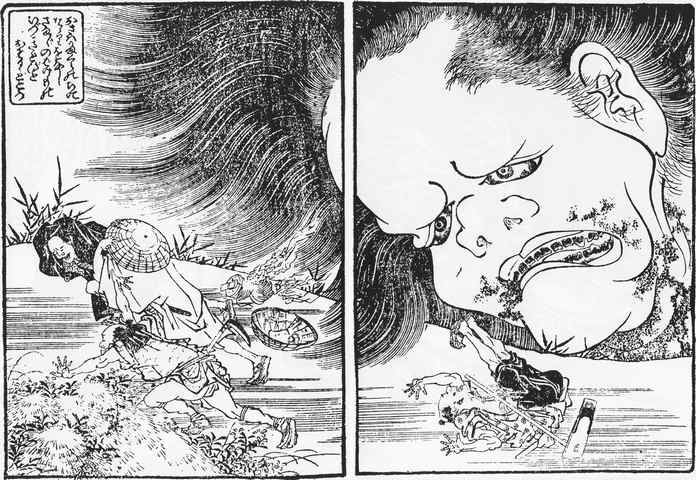
The image of Ōkubi that appeared in the painting "Kinseikaidan Shimoyonohoshi" by Katsushika Hokusai

Ōkubi (大首) (おおくび) (the giant head) is a Japanese yōkai. Its image is mostly a huge female head and has the characteristics of a married woman's teeth painted black. Their true identities are said to be human vengeful spirits and obsessions turned into yōkai.

Some say that Ōkubi is not a Japanese monster in folklore but was created to satirize monks who broke their precepts.

== Story ==
There is such a story in Tōtei Bukkairoku, a collection of monster stories in the mid-Edo period. When the protagonist opened his storage room one day, he saw a huge old woman's face. It was very weird, and he called it Ōkubi's yōkai (the monster with the giant head). The protagonist poked the giant face with tongs, but Okubi didn't respond, and when he touched it with his hands, it felt sticky.

Ōkubi has the ability to make people sick. The mid-Edo period haiku poet Hori Bakusui wrote about Ōkubi in his works. It was a night after the rain, when the moon came out, and with the sound of thunder, a Ōkubi about 2 meters high appeared on the top of the wall. This Ōkubi blew on someone, and the part touched by the breath immediately turned yellow and swollen. Later, the doctor prescribed a medicated bath to cure it.

== Modern image ==
There is a story titled Ōkubi in the short story collection Hyakkiyakou-yō (百鬼夜行―陽) by Natsuhiko Kyogoku. At the end of the story, it was the vision that the protagonist, who blamed himself for his ugly sexual desire, saw in the morgue. The Ōkubi laughed loudly in the appearance of the female corpse in the morgue, and later transformed into the faces of the women who had sex with the protagonist, and finally it turned into a combination of many female genitals.

The image of Okubi also appeared in Japanese manga and anime, and appeared as a villain monster in Shigeru Mizuki's work GeGeGe no Kitaro. In the manga, Ōkubi was formed by eating canned human souls, resulting in the degeneration of limbs and the enlargement of the head. In the manga, Ōkubi has a sunken left eye, which is very frightening, and can manipulate bones with telekinesis and manipulate air to create vacuums and storms.

== Similar Feature ==
Like Ōkubi, Japanese folklore also has some yōkai whose heads are prominent features. See also Rokurokubi and Wanyūdō
