= Abura-sumashi =

Japanese folklore

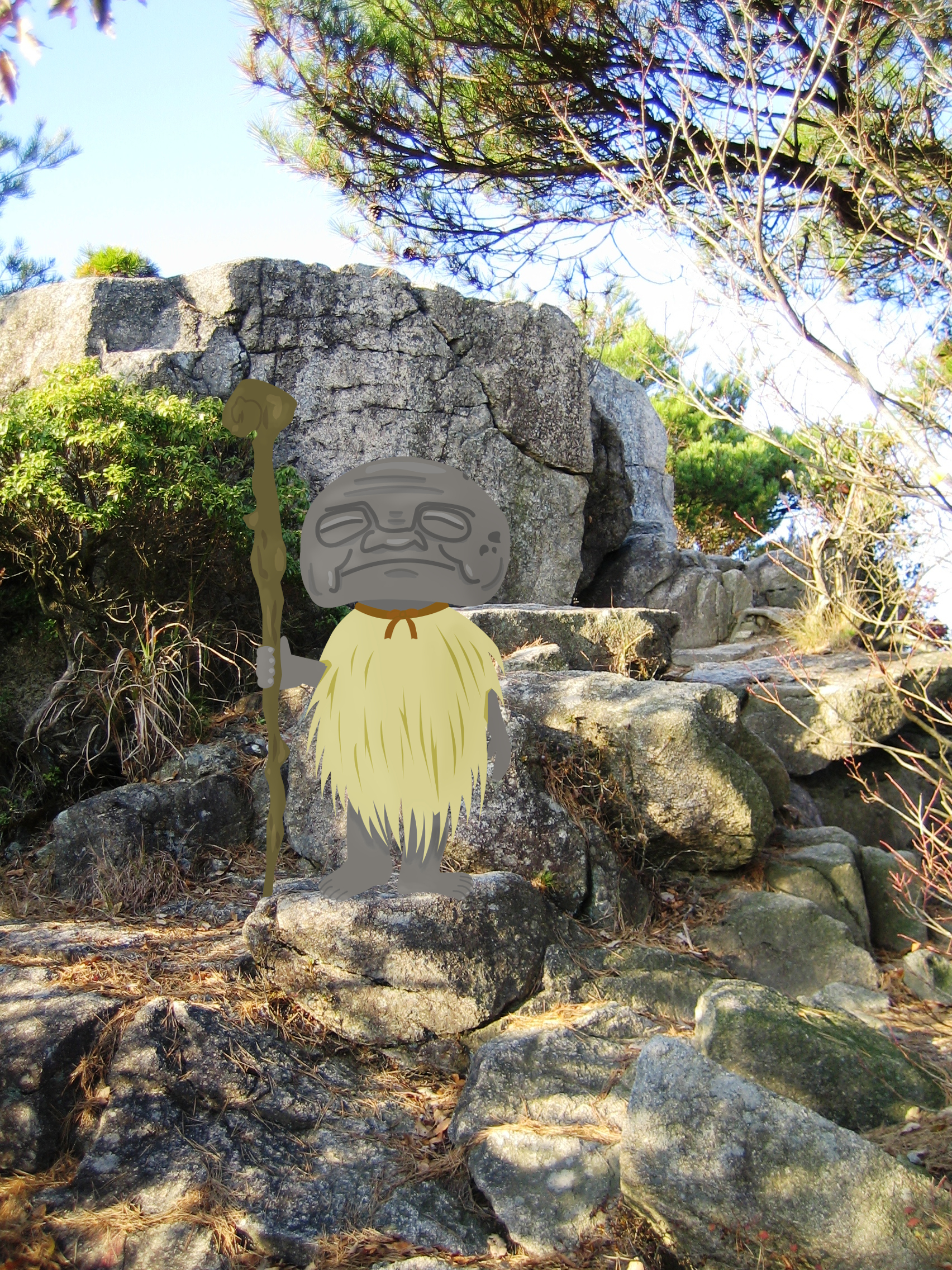
A depiction of the abura-sumashi.

Abura-sumashi (油(あぶら)すまし, "Oil Presser") is a rare creature from the folklore of Amakusa in Kumamoto Prefecture that lives in the mountain passes of Kumamoto.

== Mythology ==
This spirit, which surprises people on the Kusazumigoe mountain pass, is thought to be the ghost of a human who stole oil and fled into the woods.

In the days before electricity, oil was a very valuable commodity, necessary for lighting and heating a house. As such, it was thought that the theft of oil, particularly from temples and shrines, could lead to punishment via reincarnation as a yōkai.

In many stories an old grandmother walking a mountain pass with her grandchildren will say, "You know, a long time ago, an abura-sumashi used to live in these parts," and a mysterious voice will call out in reply, "I still do!" Or on rare occasions the abura-sumashi will appear to the travelers, materializing out of thin air.

In modern media the abura-sumashi is often depicted as, "a squat creature with a straw-coat covered body and a potato-like or stony head," an appearance inspired by the artwork of Shigeru Mizuki.
