= Ittan-momen =

Japanese yōkai

Ittan-momen (一反木綿, "one bolt (tan) of cotton") are yōkai (supernatural beings) in the folklore of Kōyama, Kimotsuki District, Kagoshima Prefecture (now Kimotsuki). They are also called ittan monme or ittan monmen.

== Summary ==
According to the Ōsumi Kimotsukigun Hōgen Shū (大隅肝属郡方言集), jointly authored by the locally born educator Nomura Denshi and the folkloricist Kunio Yanagita, at evening time, a cloth-like object about 1 tan in area (about 10.6 metres (35 ft) in length and 30 centimetres (12 in) in width) would flutter around attacking people.

They are said to wrap around people's necks and cover people's faces and suffocate people to death, and in other tales it is said that wrapped cloths would spin around and around and quickly come flying, wrap around people's bodies, and take them away to the skies.

There is a story where one man hurrying to his home at night when a white cloth came and wrapped around his neck, and when he cut it with his wakizashi (short sword), the cloth disappeared, and remaining on his hands was some blood.

In regions where they are said to appear and disappear, there seemed to be a custom where children were warned that if they play too late, that "ittan momen would come."

Also, it is said that in Kimotsuki, there are shrines (the Shijūkusho Jinja for example) where ittan momen are said to frequently appear, and it was believed that when children pass in front of the shrine, an ittan momen flying above in the skies would attack the last child in line, so children would go run ahead and cut through.

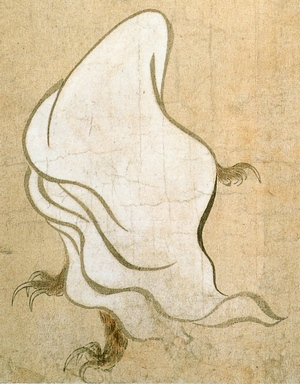
The cloth yōkai in the Hyakki Yagyō Emaki by Tosa Mitsunobu

In the classical yōkai emaki, the Hyakki Yagyō Emaki, there is a yōkai shaped like a cloth with arms and legs. The folklorist Komatsu Kazuhiko hypothesizes that this is the origin of ittan momen.

== Recent sightings ==
According to a report from the yōkai researcher Bintarō Yamaguchi, there have been claims of flying cloth-shaped objects said to be ittan momen.

In Kagoshima Prefecture there are claims that white cloth-like objects have been seen flying in low altitude. In Fukuoka Prefecture and in Kyushu there have been claims of extremely speedy ittan momen flying alongside shinkansen trains witnessed by shinkansen passengers.

Outside Kyushu there have been claims in Higashi-Kōenji Station and Ogikubo, Tokyo. In Higashi-Kōenji, a woman walking her dog said she saw a cloth flying in the skies.

In Shizuoka Prefecture, elementary school kids were said to have seen a transparent sheet-like object flutter around.

While filming Natsuhiko Kyogoku "Kai", the actor Shirō Sano said he saw an ittan momen flying above with a long white shape.

== True identity ==
Ittan momen are thought to appear in the evening, but the general view is that this is because in the past, parents needed to do farmwork for the entire day including at this time and therefore could not keep an eye on their children, so the tales of ittan momen were told to children to warn them of the dangers of playing too late. Also, in the lands where the legend is told, there is a custom of raising a cotton flag during burials for the purpose of mourning, so it is inferred that some of these would be blown by the wind and fly in the air and thus be connected to the legends of the ittan momen yōkai.

In the Japanese television series Tokoro-san no Me ga Ten! there was an experiment performed in which a piece of cloth about 50 centimetres (20 in) long was set up and moved in the darkness, and the average length reported by the people who saw it was 2.19 metres (7 ft 2 in), with the longest being 6 metres (20 ft). The program suggested that when a white or bright objects move in the darkness, a positive afterimage optical illusion would leave a trail due to movement, causing soaring things in the forests at night such as musasabi to be seen as longer than they actually are, and thus mistaken as ittan momen.

== In fiction ==
There are no depictions of ittan momen in classical yōkai emaki, so these yōkai was once relatively unknown, but they have become more widely known since appearing in Mizuki Shigeru's manga GeGeGe no Kitarō. This manga depicted them as speaking a Kyushu dialect, having good-natured personalities, and having a unique look while flying, which raised their fame and popularity despite their original legend of attacking people. In Mizuki's depictions these yōkai are depicted as a cloth with two eyes and two arms, so now they are commonly perceived to be pieces of cloth with two eyes in yōkai depictions, but Mizuki's depictions are original inventions and the ones in actual legend and in the previous witness reports have no eyes or arms and are instead simply flying objects that resembled cloth. In Mizuki's birthplace, Sakaiminato, Tottori Prefecture, they ranked number 1 in the "First Yōkai Popularity Poll" held by the tourism association.

In Kamen Rider Hibiki they appeared as enemy characters and they were based on the original legend with some extra original twists on their appearance and personality.

In 2007, the local historian of Kagoshima Prefecture, Takenoi Satoshi, started creating kamishibai of ittan momen so that such legends that are gradually being forgotten can be remembered by the children.

In the 2020 anime adaptation of the In/Spectre ("Kyokō Suiri") novels, an ittan momen drawn in the Mizuki style, flies out from under the skirt of the female protagonist Kotoko.

== Similar yōkai ==
The following are yōkai considered to be similar to ittan momen. The musasabi would glide through the air along forest streets at night and cling to people's faces in surprise, so it is theorized that they are thought to have inspired a yōkai like this.

Fusuma ("bedding")

A yōkai told to frequently appear and disappear on Sado Island in the Edo Period. It was a yōkai that looked like a large furoshiki, and they would come flying out of nowhere at roads at night and cover the heads of pedestrians. They cannot be cut with blades of any sharpness, but they can be bit apart with teeth that have been blackened at least once. It is said that because of this, there was a custom for males to blacken their teeth.

Futon kabuse (literally, "cover with futon")

Saku-shima, Aichi Prefecture. In the writings of the folkloricist Kunio Yanagita, it is only written that "they'd float along and flying in with a whoosh, covering and suffocating to death," so there are not many legends about it and not much is known, but it is interpreted to be a futon-shaped object that come flying in and covering people's faces and suffocating them to death.

== In popular culture ==
- In the anime/manga series Inu x Boku SS, one of the characters, Renshō Sorinozuka, is an Ittan-momen.
- In the tokusatsu franchise Super Sentai, the Ittan-momen was seen as a basis of a monster in series installments themed after Japanese culture:
  - In Kakuranger (1994), one of the Youkai Army Corps members the Kakurangers fought was an Ittan-momen. It appeared in the Mighty Morphin Power Rangers toyline as "Calcifire".
  - In Shinkenger (2009), one of the Ayakashi, named Urawadachi, served as the basis of the Ittan-momen within the series. He was not adapted into Power Rangers Samurai.
  - In Ninninger (2015), one of the Youkai the Ninningers fought was an Ittan-momen, with elements borrowed from a carpet and a magician. It was later adapted into Power Rangers Ninja Steel as Abrakadanger who appears in his self-titled episode.
- In The Legend of Korra in the Avatar series, the two waring spirits, Raava and Vaatu that are based on Yin and Yang, may have had their designs inspired from Ittan-momen.
- In Yo-kai Watch, the Ittan-momen appears as a cloth-strip Yo-kai and is called So-Sorree in the English dub. Anyone inspirited by So-Sorree can become mischievous and then give insincere apologies. So-Sorree can evolve into Bowminos (a domino-shaped Yo-kai who makes anyone it inspirits give sincere apologies) and can be fused with Merican Flower to become Ittan-Sorry.
- In GeGeGe no Kitarō, a recurring yōkai character named Ittan Momen (Rollo Cloth in English translations) appears as an anthropomorphic cloth with the ability to fly. He is among Kitaro's core group of friends.
