= Azukiarai =

Phenomenon in Japanese folklore

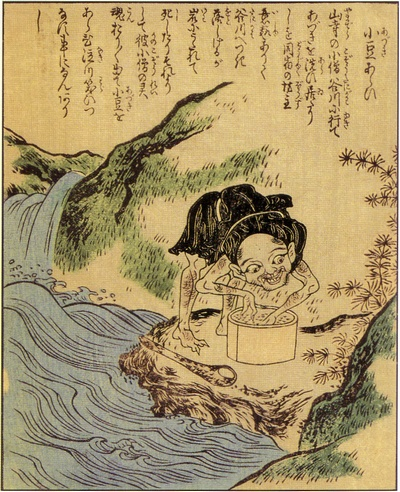
The azukiarai as depicted in Takehara Shunsen's Ehon Hyaku Monogatari.

Azukiarai (小豆洗い, "azuki bean washing"), or Azukitogi (小豆とぎ, "azuki bean grinding"), is a ghostly phenomenon in Japanese folklore, in which a mysterious noise that sounds like azuki beans being washed or ground is heard. It usually occurs near a river or other body of water. Sometimes the creature or spirit responsible amuses itself by singing "azuki togou ka, hito totte kuou ka? shoki shoki." ("Will I grind my azuki beans, or will I get a person to eat? shoki shoki."), and anyone who approaches will inevitably fall into the water.

While the perpetrator is seldom seen, he is often described as a short-statured man of grotesque appearance with a large balding head, crooked teeth, thin moustache, large bulging yellow eyes, wearing ragged clothes and bent over a pail washing azuki beans. Azukiarai is sometimes blamed on a tanuki (raccoon dog) or weasel.
