= The Whale God =

1962 tokusatsu film by Daiei Film

Killer Whale
- Film poster

Japanese name
- Kanji: 鯨神
Transcriptions
- Revised Hepburn: Kujira Gami
- Directed by: Tokuzō Tanaka
- Screenplay by: Kaneto Shindo
- Based on: The Whale God by Kōichirō Uno
- Produced by: Masaichi Nagata
- Starring: Kojiro Hongo; Shintaro Katsu; Shiho Fujimura; Kyoko Enami; Takashi Shimura; Chikara Hashimoto
- Cinematography: Setsuo Kobayashi
- Edited by: Tatsuji Nakashizu
- Music by: Akira Ifukube
- Production company: Daiei Film
- Distributed by: Daiei Film
- Release date: July 15, 1962 (Japan)
- Running time: 100 minutes
- Country: Japan
- Language: Japanese

The Whale God (Japanese: 鯨神, Hepburn: Kujira Gami), alternatively known as Killer Whale, is a 1962 Japanese tokusatsu (kaiju) film produced by Daiei Film based on the 1961 Akutagawa Prize–winning novel of the same name by Kōichirō Uno. It was presumably inspired by the 1851 novel Moby-Dick by Herman Melville.

It was the company's first kaiju film to be officially released, being simultaneously developed along with the scrapped Giant Sea Demon and Giant Sea Demon Dagora, the precursors of Giant Horde Beast Nezura which itself became a Gamera predecessor.

== Plot ==
In the early Meiji era, on Hirado Island, a whaling village loses many of its men to a huge North Pacific right whale over a period of years. One widow raises her sons to avenge their father and grandfather's deaths, but her elder son is also killed hunting the whale. Her younger son, Shaki, becomes a proficient whaler and the chief harpooner of the village. When one of his friends - who is engaged to Shaki's sister - leaves for Nagasaki to train as a doctor, Shaki berates him, saying no man should leave the village until the Whale God is slain.

The elder of the village promises his land, title and daughter Toyo to the man who kills the whale. Shaki accepts the challenge, but so does an outsider named Kishū from the Kishū region. After Shaki visits the elder for a private meeting in which he encourages Shaki, Toyo tells her father she doesn't want to marry Shaki. Her father admits that she won't have to, as the man who kills the Whale God will almost certainly be killed in the attempt. The villagers side with Shaki and fight Kishū a number of times, but Kishū wins every fight. He attempts to challenge Shaki, who always refuses to fight him, saying his only opponent is the Whale God.

A local peasant girl named Ei is in love with Shaki and is jealous of his presumptive betrothal to Toyo. Shaki is not interested in either woman but is fixated on the whale. After watching them together, Kishū attacks and rapes Ei. She becomes pregnant but conceals the pregnancy from everyone. Shaki's mother dies, and when his doctor friend returns from Nagasaki for the funeral, he changes his mind and encourages him to leave the village with his sister.

Shaki finds Ei attempting to give birth to her baby in secret. She gives birth to a baby boy, Jaya, who Shaki claims as his own son and marries Ei. Toyo is furious that he has humiliated her. Shaki tells Ei he doesn't care who the real father is. Kishū seems troubled by the baby's arrival. A telegram arrives reporting the Whale God's imminent arrival. In an unguarded moment, Shaki implies to Ei that he claimed Jaya as his son so that he will have someone to succeed him if the Whale God kills him. Kishū finally manages to provoke Shaki to a fight, which ends in a bruising draw.

On the hunt in the morning, the villagers entangle the Whale God with nets and repeatedly harpoon it. Kishū recklessly dives in to attack the whale personally, before it is weakened enough. He repeatedly stabs the whale in a vital spot with a harpoon, but is dragged under and drowned, his body entangled in the nets. Shaki then swims over and, despite suffering serious injuries, manages to kill the whale. The villagers decapitate it, butcher it, and leave its head on the beach.

A critically injured Shaki demands to be taken to the head. The village elder promises to hold up his end of the bargain, but Shaki dismisses him. It is clear to Shaki that he only has hours to live and he can now see the madness which afflicted the village. Ei confesses that Kishū is Jaya's real father. Shaki says he suspected that after he saw Kishū attack the whale: it seemed that he sacrificed himself to make it easier for Shaki to kill. He asks Ei to forgive Kishū. He then lies on the beach communing with the head of the Whale God. Some distance away, Kishū's body floats unattended in the surf.

== Cast ==
- Shintaro Katsu as Kishū
- Kojiro Hongo as Shaki
- Shiho Fujimura as Ei
- Kyoko Enami as Toyo
- Chikara Hashimoto
- Chieko Murata as Shaki's mother

== Production ==
Yonesaburo Tsukiji was originally appointed to the tokusatsu filming of The Whale God, however he was suddenly transferred to the 1962 film The Great Wall, and Toru Matoba instead became the tokusatsu director for The Whale God.

Despite color tokusatsu films having existed since the 1956 film Warning from Space, both The Whale God and the later Gamera, the Giant Monster were produced in black-and-white due to Daiei Film's financial situation.

Unlike later productions by other companies, (Note: Most notably Gappa: The Triphibian Monster by Nikkatsu and The X from Outer Space by Shochiku.) Daiei Film intentionally avoided receiving any assistances from Eiji Tsuburaya and his team for their tokusatsu films, including The Whale God and the Gamera franchise. At that time, domestic film studios had faced constraints from the Six-Company Agreement (Five-Company Agreement), led by Masaichi Nagata himself, to prevent unfettered sharing of human resources and expertise by different companies.

== Manga ==
A three-part manga adaptation of The Whale God by Takao Saito was serialized in Weekly Bokura Magazine beginning in January 1979. It was collected as a tankōbon by Leed Publishing in November 2008.

== Legacy ==
Although not strictly depicting a fictional monster (kaiju), The Whale God was the first Daiei Film production to feature a rampaging megafauna, predating the company's Gamera and Daimajin franchises and the Japanese "Kaiju Boom" of the mid-to-late-1960s; the boom was formed after The Whale God and early Gamera films under constraints from the aforementioned Six-Company Agreement (Five-Company Agreement). Various crews (Note: Such as Toru Matoba, Fuminori Ohashi, Ryosaku Takayama, and so on.) and actors of The Whale God subsequently contributed in tokusatsu productions both by Daiei and other companies.

A possible reference to the film, involving Gamera encountering a cow-calf pair of North Pacific right whales, was included in the screenplay to the 1999 film Gamera 3: Revenge of Iris, but went unused. The authors of the Gamera franchise participated in the book, which featured a concept plot based on the scrapped Gamera film due to the bankruptcy of Daiei, involving the Whale God along with Gamera franchise characters and Nezura and Pairan.

Following the theatrical release of the film, its title "Kujira Gami" has been sporadically used for whale-related entities by other authors and franchises such as Shigeru Mizuki and Yōsuke Takahashi.
