= Warning from Space =

1956 Japanese science fiction tokusatsu film

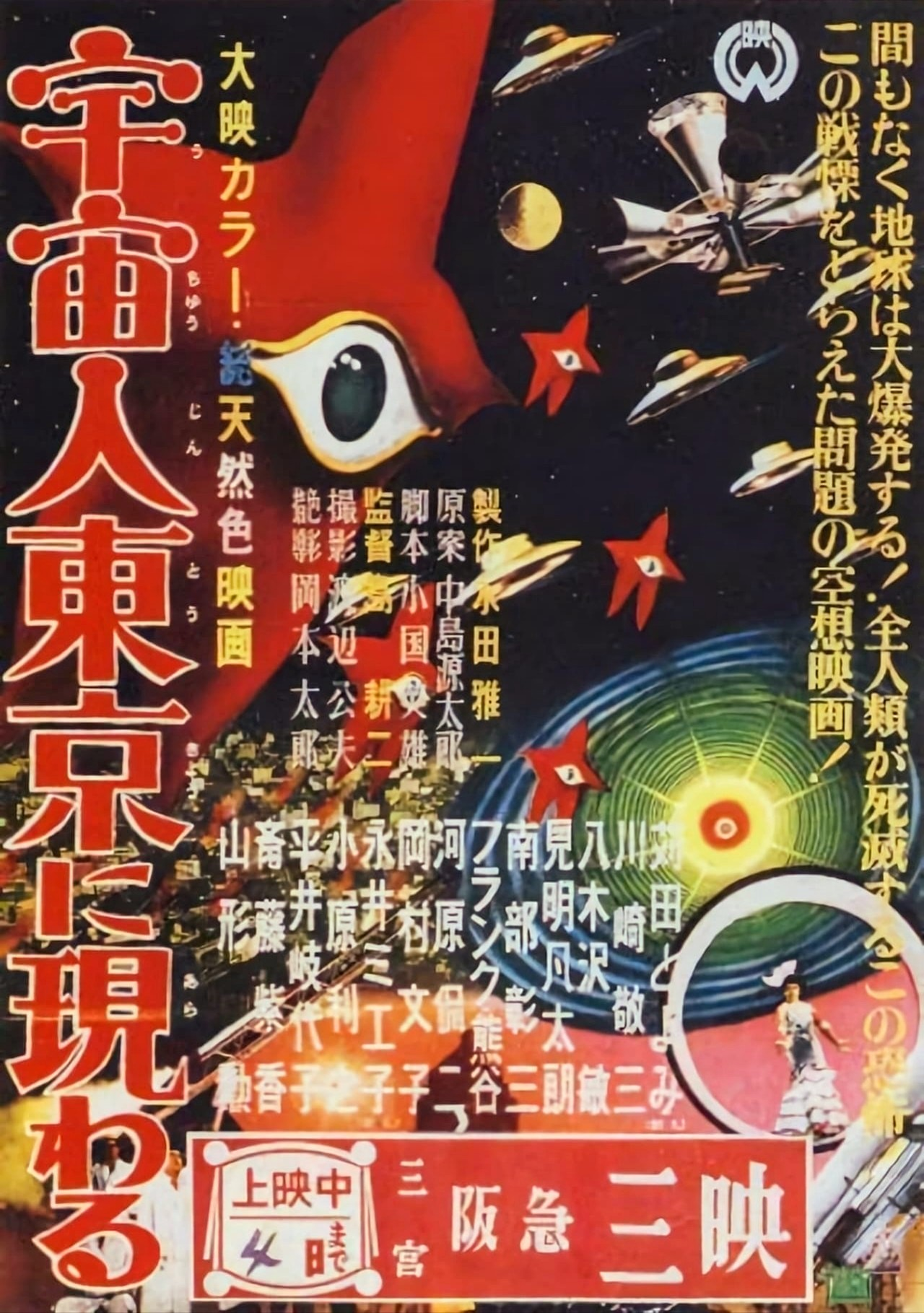
- Theatrical release poster
- Directed by: Koji Shima
- Screenplay by: Hideo Oguni
- Based on: A novel by Gentaro Nakajima
- Produced by: Masaichi Nagata
- Starring: Keizo Kawasaki; Toyomi Karita; Bin Yagasawa; Shōzō Nanbu; Bontarô Miyake; Mieko Nagai; Kiyoko Hirai; Fumiko Okamura; Isao Yamagata
- Cinematography: Kimio Watanabe
- Edited by: Toyo Suzuki
- Music by: Seitaro Omori
- Production company: Daiei Tokyo Studio
- Distributed by: Daiei Film
- Release date: January 29, 1956 (Japan)
- Running time: 87 minutes
- Country: Japan
- Language: Japanese

Warning from Space (Japanese: 宇宙人東京に現わる, Hepburn: Uchūjin Tōkyō ni arawaru; lit. 'Spacemen Appear in Tokyo') is a 1956 Japanese science fiction film directed by Koji Shima. It was written by Hideo Oguni based on Gentaro Nakajima's novel. In the tokusatsu film's plot, starfish-like aliens "Pairan" (Japanese: パイラ人, Hepburn: Pairajin) (Note: Alternatively as "Pairan Seijin" (Japanese: パイラ星人, Hepburn: Paira Seijin).) disguised as humans travel to Earth to warn of the imminent collision of a rogue planet and Earth. As the planet rapidly accelerates toward Earth, a nuclear device is created at the last minute and destroys the approaching world.

Produced and distributed by Daiei Film under Masaichi Nagata, it was the first colored Japanese science fiction film, and was also the nation's first full-scaled science fiction film to feature an extraterrestrial race. The film is also known for its influences on Stanley Kubrick who subsequently directed 2001: A Space Odyssey (1968), and also predates Daiei's most iconic tokusatsu characters, Gamera and Daimajin. Its special effects director was Toru Matoba, a notable figure among the tokusatsu genre who contributed in Ultraman-related contents (Note: Ultra Q, Ultraman, Ultraseven, Kaiju Booska, Ultraman: Great Monster Decisive Battle, and Kaiki Daisakusen.) and Spectreman after the 1956 film, and the prominent avant-garde artist Tarō Okamoto was Pairan's designer.

== Plot ==
A small ship travels to a rotating space station. Aboard the station, a group of starfish-like aliens called Pairans discuss how to warn humans of an impending disaster, deciding on contacting Japanese scientist Dr. Komura. Meanwhile, flying saucers are spotted over the skies of Tokyo, baffling scientists. A journalist tries to get a statement from Dr. Komura about the sightings, but Komura replies that there is not enough evidence to formulate a hypothesis. At an observatory, Professor Isobe spots an object in his telescope apparently releasing smaller objects.

Isobe discusses his findings with Kumara and a physician, Dr. Matsuda, who believes they should get photographs via a rocket. The photographs they retrieve, however, turn out to be unclear, though they deduce the object has a high energy output. In the meantime, the extraterrestrials have been unsuccessfully attempting to contact humans. They begin appearing in lakes and rivers, frightening local fishermen and sailors. One of the aliens manages to secure a photo of Hikari Aozora, a famous Japanese entertainer. Their plan is for one of the aliens to mutate into the form of Aozora. Back aboard the space station, one of the Pairan leaders, Ginko, volunteers herself. Her starfish form is slowly mutated into a human form.

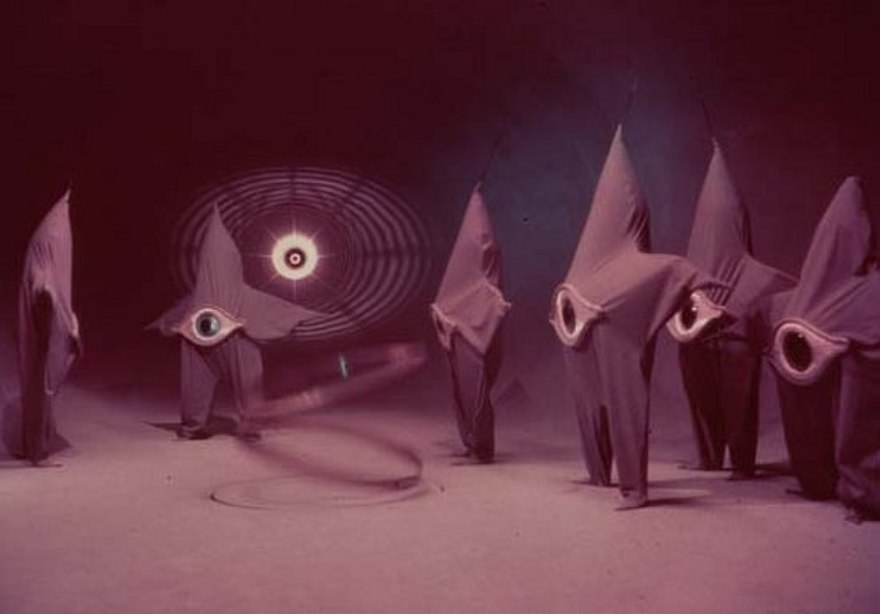
The starfish-like Pairans in discussion aboard the space station

On Earth, Toru, Isobe's son, discovers the disguised alien floating in the water. After her rescue, Ginko exhibits superhuman characteristics such as jumping ten feet into the air and being able to materialize in different places without needing to walk. Soon, she disrupts Dr. Matsuda's work on a nuclear device, explaining she understands the complex equations he was writing and warning against the effects of a device, leading him to believe she is not human. Shortly afterwards, as the team of scientists discuss her abnormal traits, the camouflaged Ginko appears and reveals her true identity, explaining she is from Paira, a world on the same orbit as Earth but on the opposite side of the Sun. She then continues to reveal her mission, to warn Earth of an imminent collision of a rogue planet, which is dubbed "Planet R" by the media. They send a formal letter to the World Congress, which treats their communication with silent contempt (Japanese: mokusatsu). It takes Planet R's acceleration towards Earth being viewed through the observatory telescope for the World Congress to act. Believing that humanity could resolve the crisis on its own, every nuclear-capable nation on Earth launches its nuclear weapons at the rogue planet, which ineffectively explode on its surface.

In the meantime, a group of spies have abducted Matsuda and are attempting to steal his formula to the nuclear device. Matsuda does not comply and is eventually tied to a chair in a remote building. Planet R begins its closest approach to Earth and begins to wreak havoc, first by causing the atmosphere's temperature to rise to dangerous levels. Following the disruption to the climate, powerful tidal interactions between Earth and Planet R trigger massive earthquakes, followed by tsunamis which inundate coastal areas of Japan. As Earth's destruction approaches, Ginko returns to find that Planet R has not been destroyed. She locates Matsuda through Pairan technology and gathers the formula for the nuclear device, returning to the space station to load the completed weapon into a missile. As the scientists watch, the Pairans fire the missile, which impacts and destroys Planet R, buffeting the Earth with a shock wave, but saving it from total destruction. As the climate returns to normal, Ginko changes back to her original form aboard the space station.

== Cast ==
- Keizo Kawasaki as Dr. Toru Itsobe
- Toyomi Karita as Hikari Aozora / Ginko
- Bin Yagisawa as No. 2 Pairan
- Shōzō Nanbu as The Elder Dr. Itsobe
- Bontarō Miake as Dr. Komura
- Mieko Nagai as Taeko Komura
- Kiyoko Hirai as Mrs. Matsuda
- Isao Yamagata as Dr. Matsuda

== Production ==
After the success of Toho's 1954 film Godzilla, which depicted a giant dinosaur attacking Tokyo, many Japanese film studios began to produce similar monster films, including Warning from Space. Along with other films such as Shintōhō's Fearful Attack of the Flying Saucers and the American Forbidden Planet, Warning from Space became part of a fledgling subgenre of films based around science fiction creatures. The film also used the theme of atomic bombs that was present in many films at the time, but showed how the weapons, which devastated the Japanese cities of Hiroshima and Nagasaki a decade earlier, could be put to good use. Still others noted the film used another common theme of cosmic collisions in the style of earlier films such as the 1931 film End of the World, which depicted a comet on a collision course with the Earth.

The Pairan aliens were designed by Tarō Okamoto, which used a single eye that is common among science fiction aliens. Although official film posters showed the Pairan aliens towering over buildings, the actual cinematic version of the aliens were on the scale of humans, at about two meters. Walt Lee reports that Gentaro Nakajima's novel, on which this film was based, was in turn based on the Japanese folktale Kaguya-hime. The film was one of fourteen Japanese color pictures produced in early 1956, but the first color Japanese science-fiction film.

Its plot to depict appearances of extraterrestrials and astronomical object bears similarities to classic productions such as End of the World (1931), The Day the Earth Stood Still (1951), When Worlds Collide (1951), and The War of the Worlds (1953). There exist several similarities in plots between Warning from Space and Invasion of the Body Snatchers, which was released in the United States on February 5, 1956, a week after the release on Warning from Space in Japan.

The Japanese title of Warning from Space bears the term "appear" (現わる, arawaru); it had been repeatedly used by Daiei Film at that time including The Invisible Man Appears, the Japanese title of The Beast from 20,000 Fathoms, which later influenced the production of Gamera, the Giant Monster, and Gamera-related post-Daiei productions, Giant Monsters Appear in Tokyo by Shochiku, (Note: Shochiku distributed Gamera the Brave (2006), and the original concept of What to Do with the Dead Kaiju? (2022) intended to involve Gamera's corpse. The Next Generation: Patlabor (2014), distributed by Shochiku, involved several stakeholders from Gamera and related productions, introduced a presumed etymological reference to Giant Monsters Appear in Tokyo.) and Giant God Warrior Appears in Tokyo by Studio Ghibli.

The Invisible Man Appears and Rainbow Man were the first post-war science fiction films in Japan. The two films were also produced under Masaichi Nagata, and involved Eiji Tsuburaya and Sadamasa Arikawa and Shuzaburo Araki in productions; the three participated in these films with their intentions to join Daiei Film, however they eventually returned to Toho and contributed in Godzilla (1954).

== Release ==
Warning from Space was released in Japan on January 29, 1956. Daiei also hoped to find a foreign market for Warning from Space, though the company found difficulty in selling it. Nevertheless, the film played at both King Cinema in Rangoon, Burma and Tai Khoon Theatre in Sandakan, Malaysia, in 1958. The film did help Daiei achieve some success in the genre. It was passed for release, anglicized as Warning from Space, by the BBFC in the United Kingdom in 1957, and later in the United States in 1963. The film was also released as The Mysterious Satellite in some areas. It was shown in the U.S. by American International Television later in the 1960s as Warning from Space. The film was released in Spain as Asalto a la Tierra, and in France as Le Satellite Mystérieux. Arrow Video released the film on Blu-ray in 2020.

== Reception ==
The film was one of many early Japanese monster films quickly produced after the success of Toho's Godzilla in 1954. After release, the film was met with negative reviews, with critics calling it "bizarre" and accusing it of using science fiction clichés.

In a contemporary review, "Neal." of Variety stated that the film was done with "candor and simplicity which makes it a good entry of its type" with "good special effects plus a fine use of color during the near approach of the flaming planet which nearly destroys the earth."

From retrospective reviews, a review included in the book A Guide to Apocalyptic Cinema, author Charles P. Mitchell called the film "bizarre" and gave it two stars. Similarly, in a 1978 issue of the magazine Cue, viewers were warned "don't watch it." In the 1986 Encyclopedia of Science Fiction Movies by Phil Hardy and Denis Gifford, it's noted that the film uses common science fiction elements of the era, including flying saucers and atomic bombs. Gyan Prakash, in his book Noir Urbanisms: Dystopic Images of the Modern City, called the film "charming." The film was noted for its misleading characterization of astronomers, with one author observing that it advanced the cinematic portrayal of astronomers as scientists in lab coats peering through an enormous telescope.

In his biography of Stanley Kubrick, author John Baxter traces Kubrick's interest in science fiction films, which led to his 2001: A Space Odyssey, to the Japanese kaiju films of the 1950s, including Warning from Space, with its "nameless two-metre-tall black starfish with a single central eye, who walk en pointe like ballet dancers." Baxter notes that despite their "clumsy model sequences, the films were often well-photographed in colour... and their dismal dialogue was delivered in well-designed and well-lit sets."

== Legacy ==
Expertises and sound effects from Warning from Space were used for Gamera films where Shima's nephew and student Noriaki Yuasa, and additional Gamera crews such as Yonesaburo Tsukiji participated in Warning from Space. Later, a book being advised by Yuasa and others included a script, which was based on a scrapped Gamera film due to the bankruptcy of Daiei Film, featuring various Daiei Film characters such as Gamera and other kaiju, Pairan, Whale God, and Nezura. The 1994 comic series Giant Monster Gamera involved an extraterrestrial race based on Pairan.

Warning from Space influenced many other Japanese science fiction films, such as Gorath by the aforementioned Eiji Tsuburaya and Ultra Q, where Toru Matoba, known for his achievements in the tokusatsu genre, moved to Tsuburaya Productions and participated in its Ultra Q and Ultraman franchises after Warning from Space. The film, along with other 1950s tokusatsu science fiction films, influenced director Stanley Kubrick, who would later direct 2001: A Space Odyssey. Gamera vs. Viras, which was also released in 1968, instead bears similarities to 2001: A Space Odyssey for its depictions of spaceships and technologies.

Critics have also noted plot similarities to the later films such as the 1965 Godzilla film Invasion of Astro-Monster, in that a friendly planet warns Japan of the atom bomb and subsequently assists in celestial defense, and The Day the Earth Caught Fire, while the release of Invasion of the Body Snatchers in the United States, the film bearing resemblances to Warning from Space, was a week after the Japanese release of the Daiei Film production.

The Pairans' asteroidean appearance is similar to that of a later pentagrammic creations; Starro, a villain from DC Comics' Justice League, the Decarabia in the Megami Tensei franchise, and Staryu and Starmie from the Pokémon franchise. The 1978 film Superman: The Movie (Note: The aforementioned Noriaki Yuasa instead introduced a parody to the 1978 Superman film in his Gamera: Super Monster (1980).) introduced spinning rings which resemble parts of Pairan's space ship in Warning from Space.

== See also ==
- List of Japanese films of 1956
- List of science fiction films of the 1950s
- The Invisible Man Appears
