= Gamera vs. Barugon =

1966 film by Shigeo Tanaka

- Theatrical release poster

Japanese name
- Kanji: 大怪獣決闘 ガメラ対バルゴン
Transcriptions
- Revised Hepburn: Daikaijū Kettō Gamera tai Barugon
- Directed by: Shigeo Tanaka
- Screenplay by: Niisan Takahashi
- Produced by: Masaichi Nagata; Hidemasa Nagata
- Starring: Kojiro Hongo; Kyoko Enami; Akira Natsuki
- Narrated by: Genzô Wakayama
- Cinematography: Michio Takahashi
- Edited by: Tatsuji Nakashizu
- Music by: Chuji Kinoshita
- Production company: Daiei Film
- Release date: April 17, 1966 (Japan)
- Running time: 100 minutes
- Country: Japan
- Language: Japanese
- Budget: ¥80 million

Gamera vs. Barugon (大怪獣決闘 ガメラ対バルゴン, Daikaijū Kettō Gamera tai Barugon; lit. 'Great Monster Duel: Gamera vs. Barugon') is a 1966 Japanese kaiju film directed by Shigeo Tanaka, with special effects by Noriaki Yuasa and Kazufumi Fujii. Produced by Daiei Film, it is the second entry in the Gamera franchise, and stars Kōjirō Hongō, Kyōko Enami, and Yūzō Hayakawa, with Teruo Aragaki as Gamera. In the film, Gamera returns to Earth to battle a reptilian monster born out of an opal brought to Japan by greedy entrepreneurs.

Due to the success of Gamera, the Giant Monster, studio president Masaichi Nagata pushed a sequel into production. Yunosaburo Saito was commissioned to write a story outline, which featured Gamera battling alien ice giants. Nagata instructed screenwriter Niisan Takahashi to write a "lavish" blockbuster and treat the monster spectacle seriously. Nagata promoted the project into an A-list production by approving a higher budget and attaching acclaimed talent. However, Yuasa, director of the previous film, was demoted to special effects director for this film. Principal photography for special effects began in January 1966 and ended in April 1966, while photography for drama scenes began in February 1966 and ended in April 1966.

Gamera vs. Barugon was theatrically released in Japan on April 17, 1966, on a double bill with Daimajin and underperformed at the Japanese box office. In 1968, it was released directly to television in the United States as War of the Monsters by American International Television. The film was followed by Gamera vs. Gyaos, released on March 15, 1967.

== Plot ==
Six months after the events of Gamera, the Giant Monster, a meteorite collides with the Z Plan rocket and frees Gamera, who returns to Earth and attacks Kurobe Dam in Japan. Ichiro, a World War II veteran, sends Kawajiri, Onodera, and his brother Keisuke, to the island of New Guinea to retrieve an opal he once found and hid in a cave. Despite warnings from the local villagers, the trio find and locate the opal, but Kawajiri dies from a fatal scorpion sting. Keisuke is betrayed by Onodera and nearly killed. Keisuke is rescued by the locals and tells one of them, Karen, about the opal they found. Karen reveals that the alleged "opal" is not really a jewel, and convinces Keisuke to take her to Japan to retrieve it.

En route to Japan, Onodera accidentally leaves the opal exposed to an infrared light. The heat incubates the opal - revealed to be an egg - and a lizard, Barugon, hatches. Upon arriving to Kobe Harbor, the ship is suddenly destroyed. Ichiro finds Onodera, who tells him that Keisuke and Kawajiri died in the jungle. Having grown to immense size, Barugon surfaces from the harbor and proceeds to attack. While debating how to recover the opal, which he still believes to be aboard the sunken ship, Onodera inadvertently blurts out that he killed his two companions and then murders both Ichiro and his wife to cover up his crime. Barugon's rainbow ray attracts Gamera and the two battle in Osaka. However, Barugon freezes Gamera in place. Keisuke and Karen find Onodera, subdue him, and leave him tied up in his home. Keisuke and Karen suggest a plan to the defense ministry by using a huge diamond to lure Barugon into a lake to drown.

The plan fails due to the diamond's insufficient radiation. Another attempt by irradiating the diamond with additional infrared radiation almost succeeds, until Onodera interferes and steals the gem. However, both he and the diamond are devoured by Barugon. Keisuke discovers that mirrors are not affected by Barugon's rainbow ray, so the military devises a plan to reflect its own rainbow emanation back with a giant mirror. Barugon is wounded, but realizing its mistake, does not shoot another rainbow. Gamera thaws out and attacks Barugon once again. After battling, Gamera drowns Barugon in Lake Biwa, then flies away. Keisuke mourns over the events caused by his greed, believing he is now alone. However, Karen holds his hand and tells him he is not alone.

== Cast ==
- Kojiro Hongo as Keisuke Hirata
- Kyōko Enami as Karen
- Yūzō Hayakawa as Kawajiri
- Takuya Fujioka as Dr. Satō
- Kōji Fujiyama as Onodera
- Akira Natsuki as Ichirō Hirata
- Yoshirō Kitahara as Professor Amano
- Ichirō Sugai as Dr. Matsushita
- Bontarō Miake as Self-Defense Force General
- Jutarō Hōjō as Self-Defense Force Commander
- Kazuko Wakamatsu as Sadae Hirata
- Yuka Konno as Onodera's lover
- Eiichi Takamura as Governor of Osaka
- Kenichi Tani as Lee
- Kōichi Itō as Metropolitan Police Superintendent-General
- Hikaru Hoshi as Awaji Maru captain
- Osamu Abe as Awaji Maru crewman
- Yoshihiro Hamaguchi as Awaji Maru crewman
- Teruo Aragaki as Gamera

== Production ==
=== Crew ===
- Shigeo Tanaka – director
- Noriaki Yuasa – special effects director
- Kazufumi Fujii – special effects
- Atsuji Shibata – production designer
- Yonejiro Saito – planning
- Yukio Okumura – audio recording
- Masao Segawa – assistant director
- Yoshizo Numata – production manager
- Hiroshi Yamaguchi – art director
- Akira Inoue – art director

=== Development ===
"I was sort of taken back that someone thought I was suited to star in a monster movie. When the part was announced, I guess that the other actors had all scurried away and that left me holding the bag. At first, I really thought that they were crazy to choose me for this project."

— Hongo on being cast in the film.

Due to the commercial success of Gamera, the Giant Monster, the follow-up, Gamera vs. Barugon, had an expanded budget that effects director Noriaki Yuasa stated was ¥80 million. Producer and studio head Masaichi Nagata promoted the film into an A-list production, assigning acclaimed director Shigeo Tanaka and acclaimed composer Chuji Kinoshita to the film. Yuasa, director of the previous Gamera film, was demoted to special effects director for Gamera vs. Barugon, despite the previous film being a financial success. Despite his demotion, Yuasa later stated that he had a father/son relationship with Tanaka. Yuasa recalled that Daiei wanted to target the film to an adult audience, stating, "I thought that mixing melodrama and monsters was difficult to do."

With the film being produced as an A-list production, Nagata chose Kojiro Hongo for the lead after wanting him to headline a film for some time, despite Hongo's uncertainty. Hongo felt "stuck" with performing in the film and initially attempted to drop out by faking an illness, which caused production to delay for a month. Upon learning that the production manager and section manager were coming to see him, Hongo placed blood-stained tissues in the trash and pretended to have chills, which convinced the managers and agreed to wait for his recovery, to Hongo's dismay. Hongo did not read the script after receiving it, believing that little acting was involved due to Yuasa telling him where the monsters would be placed. However, Hongo was unaware there were two directors: one for special effects and one for acting scenes. Years later, Hongo admitted to being grateful and proud to have been involved with the Gamera and Daimajin films. A scene that featured Osamu Abe's character slipping on a banana peel was cut to remove the comedic tone of the scene. Principal photography for the drama scenes directed by Tanaka began on February 20, 1966, and wrapped on April 5, 1966.

=== Writing ===
Screenwriter Niisan Takahashi was told to write a "lavish spectacle" and to treat the monster elements seriously. The film was originally developed as Gamera vs. the Ice Giants, which featured humanoid ice monsters bringing forth a new ice age on the world until Gamera returns to challenge them. The story outline was written by Yunosaburo Saito. This version began with volcanic eruptions and flying saucer sightings. The volcanic ash pollutes the atmosphere and ushers in a new ice age. Mankind learns that ice aliens are responsible for the eruptions. The aliens are described as hideous with their skeletons and organs transparent through their icy bodies. The aliens drop nuclear bombs into additional volcanoes to further xenoform the planet and enslave humanity. Gamera is freed from the Z-Plan rocket and returns to Earth as a battle breaks between humans and the aliens. The film's plot was also influenced by the 1936 French film They Were Five, as Takahashi was a fan of it.

Takahashi was inspired by the Jötnar from Norse mythology and the snow giants from The Conquest of the Pole, however, the ice creatures were redeveloped into Barugon. However, the ice giant idea was later redeveloped into Daimajin, dropping the ice element in favor of stone. Barugon's name was contracted from "Baru" (an aboriginal word for "crocodile's ancestor") and "Gon", derived from the English word for "dragon". The original screenplay had ideas and scene that were altered in the final film. The following are the noted differences. Barugon's back horns emitted different colors. The re-cap from the film's opening was added during post-production for audiences who had not seen the previous film. The script opened with Keisuke Hirata flying a Cessna with his instructor over Osaka, only to lose control due to radio interference. The scene then cuts to outer space where the Z-Plan rocket carrying Gamera nearly collides with a meteorite. Mission control manages to avoid a collision; however, the altered trajectory turns the rocket back to Earth and frees Gamera upon entering the Earth's atmosphere.

Gamera's attack on Kurobe Dam intercut with Keisuke on the Cessna. The establishing shot of women practicing koto was not in the script. The dancing female natives were originally topless. The quicksand scene was not featured in the script. The script featured a discussion between Keisuke and Onodera regarding bringing Kawajiri's bones back to Japan, with Onodera insisting there was no time. A scene from the script featured Onodera making his getaway at night by hijacking Dr. Matsushita's jeep. The script had Gamera flying over Onodera's ship in Kobe Bay, triggering the opal to glow. In his haste to see Gamera, Onodera kicks over the infrared lamp towards his coat pocket holding the opal. When Keisuke and Karen arrive in Japan, the dialogue remains the same as in the final film, but the script had Keisuke panicking and Karen unveil the diamond at this stage. Onodera learns about the diamond through a radio report while still tied up, as his mistress was not part of the script. In the original ending, in response to Keisuke saying he has nothing anymore, Karen asks if he has abandoned his dream of owning his own air service.

=== Special effects ===
"There were so many wires to deal with in regards to Barugon. When Gamera threw him across Lake Biwa, that alone required over 20 wires. I always had to be extremely conscious wondering the wires would be visible on-screen or not and I even had to be concerned with such details as to the position of movement of Barugon's legs when he leapt into the air. He was one of the most difficult monsters to work with. Not to mention that the materials made to use Barugon, he quickly absorbed water and he became so heavy. Oh, how heavy those things got in the water."

— Haruo Sekia on operating Barugon's wire-action.

The special effects were directed by Noriaki Yuasa. Yonesaburo Tsukiji, the effects director of the previous film, did not return due to leaving Daiei to form his own company. Yuasa began filming the effects on January 22, 1966, beginning with the Kurobe Dam attack scene. Effects photography wrapped on April 3, 1966, with the Lake Iwa battle. Effects filming lasted 73 days. Barugon's demise was originally intended to be filmed on the last day of production on April 2, 1966, however, the Barugon suit would not sink and delayed production for a full day. Suit creator Ryosaku Takayama (suit creator for the Ultraman series) removed the suit's head from the body, which allowed the prop to sink and complete production. Equis Productions, led by Masao Yagi and his family, created the film's scorpion props and the monster suits based on Akira Inoue's production designs. The Barugon suit was constructed by Takayama and detailed by the Yagi brothers.

After returning to Tokyo, Takayama worked in Equis’ workshop to build full scale suits and miniatures of both monsters and a gimmick version of Barugon capable of spraying mist from its tongue. Takayama was assisted by Keisu Murase from Equis. Teruo Aragaki (suit performer for the Ultraman series) was sent to Daiei to perform in the Gamera suit. While no documents have been released revealing the Barugon suit performer, Japanese fantasy expert August Ragone deduced that it may have been Umenosuke Izumi, due to Izumi being Aragaki's second and assuming the Gamera role in later films.

Effects engineer Hideo Arikawa supervised the operation of wire-operated props, miniatures, pyrotechnics, and the scorpion props. Due to his father's acquaintance with Eiji Tsuburaya, Yuasa was able to pull resources from Tsuburaya Productions for the film's effects. At times, Yuasa was forced to change set ups for effects shots when Tanaka would change his mind at the last minute. Yuasa protested to the studio chief after discovering that some of his effects footage was being cut from the assembly, stating, "I'm the director of special effects! Don't change this cut!" The shrieking sounds for the cave bats were originally produced for the rat creatures for the unproduced film Nezura. Yuasa noted Barugon's birth scene as the scene he "liked best". Additional wires were added to Barugon's head, as the motor inside made it heavy and difficult to lift with a single wire. It took Yuasa and his effects crew all night to film the shots with Barugon passing over a building with people projected inside and the freezing of Osaka, an effect that was deemed expensive. For scenes with Gamera breathing fire, Aragaki was not inside and the suit was held by wires. Propane and gasoline were used for the flames. Wire operations were tasked to effects engineer Haruo Sekia, who found the job difficult due to 20 wires being used during the Iwa battle scene and the materials used to make the suits making them heavy when absorbing water.

== English versions ==
After the film's completion, Daiei commissioned an English dub from Axis International, in anticipation of a wide theatrical release in the United States like the previous film. The international dub by Axis features the voices of Barry Haigh, Warren Rooke, and Ted Thomas. In 1967, American International Productions Television acquired the syndication rights to the film, as well as Gamera vs. Gyaos and Gamera vs. Viras and chose not to use the international dubs produced for all three films. AIP–TV commissioned a new English dub supervised by Salavtore Billiteri and recorded by the English Language Dubbers Association (ELDA) in Rome, Italy. AIP–TV retitled the film War of the Monsters and removed 12 minutes of footage to fit commercials into a two-hour timeslot and prevent children from growing restless. The export dub by Axis was not widely released until the late 80's, when Sandy Frank Film Syndication released the film, as well as other Gamera titles, on VHS in the United States.

== Release ==
=== Theatrical and television ===
Gamera vs. Barugon was theatrically released in Japan on 17 April 1966, on a double bill with Daimajin. Despite a high attendance, the film underperformed at the Japanese box office, mostly due to its higher budget for special effects. Theater exclusives were also a potential factor for its underperformance. The film was never released theatrically in the United States. In Germany, the film sold 225,000 tickets.

Bundling the film with Daimajin was decided by Daiei due to the commercial performance of their double billing for Gamera, the Giant Monster and New Kurama Tengu: Battle of Gojōzaka; Gamera, the Giant Monster performed financially better than the other film. The pairing of Gamera vs. Barugon and Daimajin exceeded some expectations and doubled Daiei's entire annual box office revenue; this gave Daiei incentive the continue producing sequels for both films.

Producer Masaichi Nagata invested in promotions, and advertisements were placed in leading newspapers, along with the slogan "Japanese cinema will certainly be restored" (Japanese: 日本映画は必ず復興する, Hepburn: Nihon Eiga wa Kanarazu Fukkō-suru), in response to an already-declining industry and the spread of television.

While attending screenings, Noriaki Yuasa noticed that children were becoming bored and restless during long scenes without monsters. Yuasa felt that the film lost its core audience and this inspired him to reveal the monsters earlier and consistently in later films. Yuasa was later brought back as director for the following film Gamera vs. Gyaos, and Yuasa re-framed the franchise to cater more towards children.

In 1967, the film was acquired by American International Television and released directly to television in early 1968 as War of the Monsters. This broadcast was part of a syndication package of kaiju films acquired and released by AIP-TV, which included Majin, the Monster of Terror, Monster from a Prehistoric Planet, and Godzilla vs. the Thing. Gamera vs. Barugon was one of the few films featured twice on Mystery Science Theater 3000, the first time as part of the initial KTMA series (episode 4) and again in Season 3 (episode 4), where the hosts commented on the awkward dialogue and Gamera's lack of screen time.

=== Critical response ===
In a contemporary review, Variety reviewed the film in Tokyo, noting that the special effects in the film were not up to standards of Toho's Eiji Tsuburaya and that Gamera "did not have the winning appeal of the Toho stable 'Godzilla', 'Radon'[known in English dubs as Rodan], etc." Christopher Stewardson from Our Culture awarded the film three stars out of five, praising the monster scenes and human drama, but criticized the pacing and military meetings, stating, "Gamera vs. Barugon presents an entertaining story with interesting themes. Some of its characters may be thinly constructed in their motives and morality, but that also allows the film to really embellish just how cruel and villainous they are. The monster sequences are mostly very engaging, and that the film’s human drama matches their quality is great." James McCormick from Criterion Cast praised the film's miniatures, cinematography, and Kōji Fujiyama's portrayal of Onodera. Kurt Dahlke from DVDTalk criticized the film's lack of monster battles but praised other elements, stating, "there are still plenty of sweet moments (including a giant tongue lashing) and stomped buildings, plus a generally serious tone, that marks this as a high-point in the Gamera franchise."

=== Home media ===
In the late 1980s, the export English version by Axis International debuted on VHS in the United States via the Sandy Frank Film Syndication and Celebrity Home Video. In 2003, a public domain, pan and scan version of the AIP-TV English dub was released on DVD by Alpha Video. In 2010, the Japanese version was released on DVD by Shout! Factory. In 2011, Shout! Factory included the Mystery Science Theater 3000 episode featuring the Sandy Frank version of the film on the MST3K vs. Gamera DVD collection. In 2014, the Japanese version was released on Blu-ray and DVD by Mill Creek Entertainment, packaged with other Gamera titles. In 2020, the Japanese version, the Axis English dub, and AIP-TV English version were included in the Gamera: The Complete Collection Blu-ray box set released by Arrow Video, which included all 12 films in the franchise.

The film was released on 4K UHD Blu-ray in Japan on November 21, 2025, along with Gamera, the Giant Monster and Gamera vs. Gyaos. The new 4K remasters were supervised by Shinji Higuchi (special effects director of the Heisei Gamera trilogy) and veteran color timing technician Ogura Shunichi.
