= Noriaki Yuasa =

Japanese film director

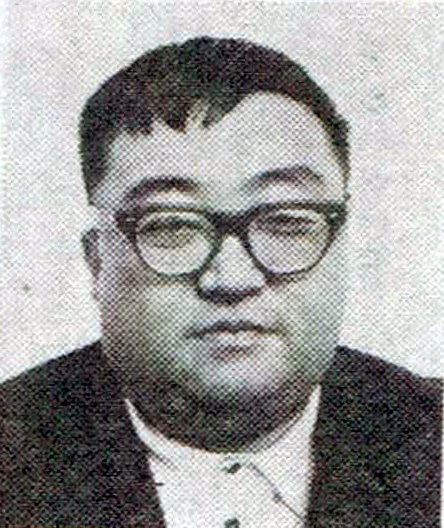
- Noriaki Yuasa in 1967
- Born: 28 September 1933; Tokyo, Japan
- Died: 14 June 2004 (aged 70); Japan
- Occupation: Film director
- Father: Hikaru Hoshi

Noriaki Yuasa (湯浅 憲明, Yuasa Noriaki) (28 September 1933 – 14 June 2004) was a Japanese director. Yuasa was the main director of the Japanese film series Gamera; he directed seven of the first eight films in the series while also providing special effects for one of them, and became known as the "Father of Gamera" (Japanese: ガメラの父, Hepburn: Gamera no Chichi). The series was created by Daiei Film Studios after the box office success of the Toho Godzilla series. Yuasa's post-Daiei career for television dramas marks him as one of the best hitmakers among the domestic television industry during the 1970s.

== Biography ==
Noriaki Yuasa was born 28 September 1933 in Tokyo, Japan. Yuasa was the son of a stage actor and a director Hikaru Hoshi. (Note: Hikaru Hoshi later appeared in If You're Happy, Clap Your Hands and Gamera vs. Barugon. The former was his debut film as a director, and it appeared in the newspaper for because of the uniqueness to have an actor appearing in his son's film.) Additionally, his family members include actors (Note: Hikaru Hoshi, two of his paternal uncles, paternal grandmother Hideko Azuma, an uncle Koji Shima, Shima's son Akihiko Katayama, Shima's first wife Ryoko Otani, Natsuko Katayama who was Shima's second wife and the foster mother of Akihiko Katayama, so on.) and movie directors (Hikaru Hoshi and Koji Shima). Yuasa began work at a young age as a child actor, while some of his careers were cancelled due to the World War II. Yuasa, who was brought up within a showbiz community, decided not to become an actor for his disfavor of relationship issues and scandals by filmmakers, actors, and actresses, including his own family members. (Note: Yuasa and his relatives had been bothered for many years due to Yuasa's paternal grandmother Hideko Azuma's widely known adulterous affairs. Yuasa's father Hikaru Hoshi was also involved in multiple love affairs, and Yuasa was treated as an illegitimate child for many years as his mother was minor when she gave birth to Noriaki. Yuasa didn't know his status until when he obtained a certified copy of family register to join Daiei Film. On the other hand, Hoshi, who underwent troubles through such relationships, concerned the possibility of his son to be involved in similar situations, and had strongly insisted Yuasa for multiple occasions to beware of friendships with actresses.) Harboring a dislike for such natures of the industry, Yuasa (in his assistant director era) once attempted to resign and wrote a letter to his father, and didn't direct romantic films throughout his career.

Yuasa was passionated about pleasing young audiences, and cherished friendships with children including Gamera fans, even after Daiei's demise. (Note: For example, following the Daiei's bankruptcy in 1971, a boy who had previously won a drawing contest for Gamera, conserned Yuasa's livelihood and the fate of the Gamera franchise. He personally managed to raise money for Yuasa's living expenses. Yuasa took the boy's feelings into account (to prepare 500 yen, which was a lot of money to a child back then) and accepted the money. Then they had a lunch together with the money.) Yuasa's personal favorite of his Gamera films was Gamera vs. Viras. His childhood experiences to witness adults, including his own teachers, to manipulate children for war and political affairs influenced his direction to make Gamera as the faithful protector of children; Yuasa appeared as a child actor in his uncle Koji Shima's war propaganda films where all domestic film studios including Daiei were forced to produce propaganda films by the order of the Imperial Japanese Armed Forces, and Masaichi Nagata and Eiji Tsuburaya (Note: Tsuburaya (exiled from Toho), and Sadamasa Arikawa and Shuzaburo Araki (left the company after the Toho strikes) were attempting to join Daiei Film by working on Japan's first post-war science fiction tokusatsu films by Daiei, The Rainbow Man and The Invisible Man Appears in 1949, partially due to their early associations with Nagata. The three eventually returned to Toho and participated in Godzilla (1954) and other productions.) were temporary purged after the World War II due to their involvements in producing propaganda films, that became the basis for the post-war tokusatsu genre in Japan. Regarding war issues, he was vocally critical of the 1954 film Godzilla for its depictions of war aftermaths, which he deemed incorrect.

After graduating university, he began to seek work on the production of films. Yuasa joined Daiei Studios in 1955 and became director in 1964 with the musical comedy film If You're Happy, Clap Your Hands, whose commercial failure eventually led to his appointment for Gamera the Giant Monster. He also participated in the 1956 tokusatsu film Warning from Space by his uncle Koji Shima as an extra, where Yuasa in his youth appeared in Shima's drama Twelve hours before going to the war (出征前十二時間, Shusseimae Jūnijikan), and Yuasa later studied under Shima.

Yuasa's next project was a film tentatively titled Giant Horde Beast Nezura which would involve real rats crawling over miniatures of cities. The rats received for the film had fleas, which halted production on Nezura. As the miniatures for the film were already built, Masaichi Nagata had to develop a giant monster to attack the city and had the idea for a giant flying turtle. Yuasa, with his screenwriter Niisan Takahashi, developed the idea into the 1965 film Gamera the Giant Monster.

Yuasa continued work directing films in the series except Gamera vs. Barugon, where he was only the special effects director. Following the collapse of Daiei in 1971, he predominantly directed work for television, such as Electroid Zaborger, Iron King, and Ultraman-related productions; Princess Comet, Ultraman 80, and Anime-chan where Ultraman 80 instead influenced the production of the Heisei Gamera trilogy by Tokuma Shoten although Yuasa was critical of the trilogy; he had highlighted the importance to differenciate from the Godzilla series, and had desired to revive the "Showa Gamera" in response to the trilogy. His last full film was Gamera, Super Monster, which included extensive stock footage from the previous seven Gamera films.

The success of the Gamera franchise temporary ameliorated the financial situation of Daiei Film, resulting in launching of subsequent tokusatsu productions most notably Daimajin and Yokai Monsters, and the Gamera franchise was practically the sole supporter of the company and its subcontractors until the actual bankruptcy in 1971; at the bankruptcy, either Yuasa or other employees allegedly destroyed suits and models of Gamera productions due to his (their) frustration(s) and distress. where the aforementioned Gamera, Super Monster exclusively relied on stock footages due to budgetary restrictions.

He later worked on smaller V-Cinema videos such as Kosupure senshi kyūtī naito 2 teikoku-ya no gyakushū (transl. Cosplay Warrior Cutie ・ Night 2 Counterattack of Imperial Shop) where he had appeared as the character "Dr. Yuasa", and also directed the acting of Gamera by Hurricane Ryu who has also written the 1994 comic Giant Monster Gamera. Yuasa had also been nominated to direct Daimajin revival attempts as a television series, though this never happened.

After the bankruptcy of Daiei Film, Yuasa devoted in productions of television dramas and advanced his career, and was eventually addressed as one of the best hitmakers of domestic television industries at that time.

Yuasa died of a stroke in Japan on 14 June 2004. Due to Yuasa's testament that he wants to "fade out" and to keep his death confidential, most of stakeholders of himself and Daiei Film were unaware of his condition and the death and knew the situation after an obituary was published.

== Legacy ==
Kiyoshi Kawamura published a novel titled The Flute of Gomera in 1971 after the bankruptcy of Daiei Film, which featured Daiei Film's tokusatsu crews facing hardships regards Gamera and other productions; its protagonist was based on Yonesaburo Tsukiji while characters based on Yuasa (with his name based on Yuasa's father Hikaru Hoshi) and others also appeared. The 2020 biopic Nezura 1964 also featured a character based on Yuasa.

== Select filmography ==
=== Film ===
Title	Year	Credited as		Notes	Ref(s)
Title	Year	Director	Special effects director	Notes	Ref(s)
A Geisha's Diary	1961			Assistant director	
Okoto and Sasuke	1961			Assistant director	
The Temple of the Wild Geese	1962			Assistant director	
The Graceful Brute	1962			Assistant director	
Giant Horde Beast Nezura	1964			Editor	
If You're Happy, Clap Your Hands	1964	Yes			
Gamera the Giant Monster	1965	Yes			
Gamera vs. Barugon	1966		Yes		
Gamera vs. Gyaos	1967	Yes			
Gamera vs. Viras	1968	Yes			
The Snake Girl and the Silver-Haired Witch	1968	Yes			
Gamera vs. Guiron	1969	Yes			
Anata gonomi no	1969	Yes			
Fire for the Glory	1969		Yes		
The Falcon Fighters	1969		Yes		
Gamera vs. Jiger	1970	Yes			
Hadaka de dakko	1970	Yes			
I am 5 years old	1970	Yes			
Gamera vs. Zigra	1971	Yes			
Seijuku	1971	Yes			
Snow Country Elegy	1971	Yes			
Gamera, Super Monster	1980	Yes			
Anime-chan	1984	Yes			

=== Television ===
- Investigative Prosecutor (1964-1965)
- The Guard-man (jp) (1965-1968)
- Saturday's Tiger (1966)
- Secret Order 883 (1967)
- Anata nara Dousuru (1967)
- Jun-ai Series (1967)
- Doremifa Nikki (1968)
- Okusama wa 18 sai (jp) (1970)
- Anata wa Inai (1970)
- Nantatte 18 sai (jp) (1971)
- Bijin wa ikaga? (jp) (1971)
- Song of Medaka (1971)
- Onna no toki ga hoshiino (1971)
- Iron King (1972)
- Mom is the rival (1972)
- Ai chan ga iku! (jp) (1972)
- GO!GO Skyer (1973)
- Love Love Rival (1973)
- Onmitsu Kenshi Tsuppashire! (jp) (1973)
- Magokoro (jp) (1973)
- Denjin Zaborger (1974)
- White Fang (jp) (1974)
- Homeless Child (jp) (1974)
- False Parents (jp) (1974)
- Adventure (jp) (1975)
- Rainbow Airport (1975)
- Sore Yuke! Katchin (jp) (1975)
- Kofuku Yuki (jp) (1975)
- Papa is single (1976)
- Keiji monogatari: Hoshizora ni ute! (jp) (1976)
- Superdog Black (1977)
- Jiken Maruhi Oryōrihō (jp) (1977)
- Princess Comet (1978)
- Inochi Haterumade (jp) (1978)
- Keppare! Dai-chan (jp) (1979)
- Ultraman 80 (1980)
- Uwasa no keiji: Tommy and Matsu (jp)（1980-1982）
- Superdog Black 2 (1981)
- Secret Detective (1981)
- Dannasama wa 18 sai (jp) (1982)
- Dreadful family Geronimo (jp) (1983)
- Mandatory Retirement Friend (jp) (1986)
- Dreadful Residential Center (jp) (1986)
- Nagoya Marriage Story 2 (1990)

=== V-Cinema ===
- Cosplay Warrior Cutie (1.0 and 1.3) (1995)
- Cosplay Warrior Cutie ・ Night 2 Counterattack of Imperial Shop (1996)

=== Others ===
- Warning from Space (1956, as an extra)
- Flight from Ashiya (1964)
- promotion film for the 4th Nippon Jamboree (1966) (Note: This influenced the production of Gamera vs. Viras.)
- Bright Town (Note: A promotion film for the Japan Crime Prevention Association.)
- Gamera Special (1991)
- The Gamera That Never Was: Gamera vs. Garasharp (1991)
- Godzilla, King of the Monsters (1998)
- Videos for karaoke
