= Gamera vs. Gyaos =

1967 film by Noriaki Yuasa

- Theatrical release poster

Japanese name
- Kanji: 大怪獣空中戦 ガメラ対ギャオス
Transcriptions
- Revised Hepburn: Daikaijū Kūchūsen Gamera tai Gyaosu
- Directed by: Noriaki Yuasa
- Screenplay by: Niisan Takahashi
- Produced by: Hidemasa Nagata; Kazumasa Nakano
- Starring: Kojiro Hongo; Kichijiro Ueda; Naoyuki Abe
- Cinematography: Akira Uehara
- Edited by: Tatsuji Nakashizu
- Music by: Tadashi Yamanouchi
- Production company: Daiei Film
- Distributed by: Daiei
- Release date: March 15, 1967 (Japan)
- Running time: 86 minutes
- Country: Japan
- Language: Japanese
- Budget: ¥60 million
- Box office: ¥97 million

Gamera vs. Gyaos (大怪獣空中戦 ガメラ対ギャオス, Daikaijū Kūchūsen Gamera tai Gyaosu; lit. 'Giant Monster Midair Battle: Gamera vs. Gyaos') (Note: Also known as Gamera vs. Gaos.) is a 1967 Japanese kaiju film directed by Noriaki Yuasa, with special effects by Yuasa. Produced by Daiei Film, it is the third entry in the Gamera franchise and stars Kojiro Hongo, Kichijiro Ueda, Tatsuemon Kanamura, Reiko Kasahara, and Naoyuki Abe, with Teruo Aragaki as Gamera. In the film, Gamera and authorities must deal with the sudden appearance of a carnivorous winged creature awakened by volcanic eruptions.

Plans for a third film were made immediately after the release of Gamera vs. Barugon, with the film financed by the UniJapan Film Association. Due to the underperformance of the previous film, Yuasa was brought back as the director and special effects director, who decided to aim the film towards children. Gyaos was created as a response to Toho's Frankenstein vs. Baragon and The War of the Gargantuas, with Yuasa pitching to writer Niisan Takahashi his idea to turn Dracula into a kaiju.

Gamera vs. Gyaos was theatrically released in Japan on March 15, 1967, on a double bill with Chiisai Tôbôsha. That same year, it was released directly to television in the United States as Return of the Giant Monsters by American International Television.

The film was followed by Gamera vs. Viras, released on March 20, 1968.

== Plot ==
A series of mysterious volcanic eruptions in Japan impact shipping and aircraft flights. An eruption at Mount Fuji attracts the giant turtle kaiju Gamera, whose arrival is witnessed by a young boy named Eiichi. A research team of geologists is sent to investigate the phenomenon in Shizuoka Prefecture, but are killed by a supersonic ray emitted from a cave which slices their helicopter in two. A reporter, Okabe, travels to a village nearby to investigate. The Chuo Expressway Corporation's plans for a roadway face challenges when the local villagers refuse to leave. The resistance is a ploy to increase the bid on the land. The foreman, Shiro Tsutsumi, and his crew are turned away by the locals as Okabe sneaks past.

Eiichi finds Okabe in the woods and leads him to a cave where Gamera might be. Okabe abandons Eiichi as the cave collapses and is devoured by a winged creature. Gamera emerges and saves Eiichi from the winged beast but is wounded in the process by its supersonic ray. While interviewed by Dr. Aoki and authorities, Eiichi names the winged monster "Gyaos". Dr. Aoki deduces it was awakened by the volcanic eruptions, can produce a supersonic ray due to a forked tongue, and cannot turn its head due to having two spines. A daytime airstrike fails to neutralize Gyaos due to its ray. Meanwhile, Gamera recovers from its wounds beneath the sea.

During a meeting, the villagers become divided on whether to sell their land or not due to Gyaos. Shiro's crew, save two, quit because of Gyaos. Despite Eiichi's claims that Gyaos is nocturnal, Gyaos ignores military flares and attacks Nagoya. Gamera appears and battles Gyaos once more, biting off its toes in the process. Dr. Aoki discovers that exposure to ultraviolet light, like the sun, causes the toes to shrink. A plan is formed to disorient Gyaos with a rotating platform for long enough for the sun to rise and kill it, using artificial blood as bait. Gyaos is lured out but the plan fails when the power station supplying electricity to the platform overheats and explodes.

After learning that the expressway would be rerouted due to Gyaos, the villagers blame the headmaster, who ordered them to hold out. The headmaster regales a plan to Shiro, inspired by Eiichi, to start a forest fire to kill Gyaos. Gyaos depletes the fire with a yellow vapor, however, the fire attracts Gamera and engages Gyaos in a final showdown. Gamera kills Gyaos by dragging it into Mt. Fuji's crater. As the authorities celebrate, Shiro affirms to the villagers that work on the expressway will resume. Eiichi bids farewell to Gamera as it flies away.

== Cast ==
- Kojiro Hongo as Shiro Tsutsumi
- Kichijiro Ueda as Tatsuemon Kanamura
- Reiko Kasahara as Sumiko Kanamura
- Naoyuki Abe as Eiichi Kanamura
- Taro Marui as Mite-no-Tetsu
- Yukitaro Hotaru as Hachikō
- Yoshiro Kitahara as Dr. Aoki
- Akira Natsuki as Self-Defense Force General
- Kenji Oyama as District Police Commissioner
- Fujio Murakami as Dr. Murakami
- Koichi Ito as Road Company Chairman
- Teppei Endo as Road Co. Local Affairs Director
- Shin Minatsu as Okabe the Photographer
- Teruo Aragaki as Gamera

== Production ==
Production credits

- Noriaki Yuasa – director, special effects director
- Kazufumi Fuji – special effects photography
- Shima Abe – assistant special effects director
- Tomohisa Yano – special effects art director
- Yuzo Kaneko – special effects synthesis
- Masao Kobayashi – assistant director
- Yukio Okumura – sound
- Heihachi Kuboe – lighting
- Akira Inoue – art director
- Nobuyoshi Ogura – sound effects

"Takahashi-san's screenplay shows Japan as it was during that time, when building the infrastructure was so important. At the time the thinking was 'we have to make freeways, no matter what'. Nowadays, it's ecological issues. Gamera must always reflect modern problems in society."

— Yuasa on adding the freeway as the backdrop.

Gamera vs. Gyaos was planned immediately after the release of Gamera vs. Barugon and it was decided that the third film would be targeted towards children. The film was financed through the UniJapan Film Association. The film's production cost was ¥60 million ($167,000), however, this figure does not include studio overhead, cast and crew salaries under contract, nor print and advertisement.

Due to the underperformance of Gamera vs. Barugon, Daiei president Masaichi Nagata assigned Noriaki Yuasa as the director and special effects director due to the first Gamera film, directed by Yuasa, being a success. When Naoyuki Abe was cast, many mistook him as Yuasa's son. A real office in Akasaka, Tokyo was used for the road construction board meeting after Yuasa asked the son of the company's president (working for Daiei at the time) to arrange the location. Daiei's dubbing studio was used as a laboratory set in the film's opening, with a few set pieces attached. The park scenes were filmed in Setagaya at the Futako-Tamagawa garden. Scenes of Nagoya Stadium were filmed at Ajinomoto Stadium.

The ending theme Gamera's Song was composed and arranged by Akira Komachi, lyrics by Hidemasa Nagata, and performed by the Hibari Children's Choir. The song was released by Daiei Records as a single. Historian August Ragone deduced that the song may have been inspired by the instrumental release of "Gammera" by The Moons, a song produced specifically for the American release of the first Gamera film.

The film, along with Wrath of Daimajin (1966) and other Daiei Film productions, obtained tax-based loans from the governmental foundation The Japanese Film Export Promotion Association (Japanese: 日本映画輸出振興協会, Hepburn: Nihon Eiga Yusyutsu Shinkō Kyōkai), which was established under the influence from Masaichi Nagata to support declining domestic film industries by exporting productions to global markets. This resulted in appointing foreign cast members and enhanced child-friendly direction for subsequent Gamera films.

=== Writing ===
Gyaos was created as a response to Toho's Frankenstein Conquers the World and The War of the Gargantuas. Yuasa pitched to writer Niisan Takahashi an idea to turn Dracula into a kaiju. Yuasa approached the film like a children's book, after feeling that children became bored during the human scenes of the previous films. Yuasa held a meeting to discuss how to jump into the action scenes as quickly as possible to retain children's attention. The film's opening was inspired by real volcanic eruptions from the Philippines, Indonesia, and Kamchatka that were happening at the time of production, with fears that Mount Fuji would become active. The expressway protest was inspired by the Sanrizuka opposition against the construction of the New Tokyo International Airport.

Producer and senior managing director Hidemasa Nagata wanted to include the protest because he found societal issues made films more interesting. Nagata also wanted a correlation between the protest, roadblocks, bid hike, and Gyaos' awakening, stating, "I want to let the children know that there were consequences for doing bad things." In an early draft, Takahashi used the working title Gamera vs. Vampire. Gyaos was named "Vampyra" and stood 67 meters high with a wingspan of 172 meters. Nagata coined the name "Gyaos" for the monster. Yuasa "hated" adding scenes with military and scientific figures on the film, and other films as well, feeling that the characters were "useless" but seemed obligatory due to the 1954 film Godzilla.

On Eiichi's role, Yuasa stated, "we wanted all the ideas to come from the child. It may be a bit silly but we didn't want theories of the adults to work in the Gamera universe". Yuasa made Eiichi point out Gyaos' nocturnal nature, feeling that it was a detail only a child would notice. Yuasa felt one of the film's messages was to show the purity of children, stating, "I think the main point of the whole film is that Eiichi and Gamera had some sort of bond or one mind. I thought that was better than some needless exposition." The car split scene was added after Takahashi saw the Toyota Corolla deluxe at a motor show, as a result, the vehicle was not produced for the film.

=== Special effects ===
The special effects were directed by Noriaki Yuasa. Gyaos was designed by art director Akira Inoue. The Gamera suit was recycled from Gamera vs. Barugon, however, the eyes were modified to look more friendly. The upper-half portion of the suit from Gamera, the Giant Monster was recycled for fire-breathing scenes. The Gamera shell that Eiichi rides was a full scale prop built at 20 meters square. The monster footage was filmed on an indoor soundstage set. Yuasa recalled spending time, energy, and money on the shot of the miniature volcano exploding, however, he later felt the result was not worth it. Yuasa disliked the oatmeal formula used to simulate flowing lava in other films and instead backlit translucent molds and had them pulled by hidden cables.

Yuasa felt that nighttime matching shots were easier to achieve than daytime opticals due to film elements not requiring precision. The Gyaos cave was a set constructed at Daiei. For the scene with Okabe being lifted by Gyaos, the camera was tilted at a 90 degree angle while the background shifted horizontally. The full scale Gyaos claw was operated by three people that required them to pull on a cable attached to it. Historian Stuart Galbraith IV deduced that the giant Gyaos claw was recycled for Gyaos' severed toes. Gamera's blood was pumped manually by the crew, which Yuasa found difficult to match the animation to Gyaos' beam.

For the shot of Eiichi climbing Gamera's shell, Yuasa filmed a stunt double climbing a ladder that was later layered into the shell. The Highland Park miniature was based on Fuji-Q Highland. The Hotel Hi-land miniature was inspired by the Hotel New Otani Tokyo, which upset the then-hotel president and told Daiei president Masaichi Nagata, "we're barely open yet Gamera has already broken it." For the scene of Gamera recovering underwater, a 20 centimeter prop was built and filmed in a fish tank. Lighting up Gamera's leg sockets for flying scenes cost ¥12,000 ($33) per socket. Gyaos' beam required optical work that cost ¥3,500 per cut.

== English versions ==
Following the film's completion, Daiei commissioned Axis International to produce an English dub. This dub was recorded in Hong Kong and was used as a "sales marketing tool" to attract international distribution. That same year, American International Productions Television acquired the film, along with Gamera vs. Barugon and Gamera vs. Viras, for the American television market and commissioned a new English dub. Journalist James Flower deduced that the AIP–TV version may have been dubbed by the English Language Dubbers Association (ELDA) due to Gamera's name being mispronounced as "Guh-mer-ah", a fluke that is consistent in ELDA's dub of Gamera vs. Barugon. AIP–TV retitled the film as Return of the Giant Monsters, left it uncut, and added two brief insert shots replacing Japanese signs with English signs. Gamera's Song was cut from the AIP–TV version.

== Release ==
=== Theatrical and television ===
Gamera vs. Gyaos was released theatrically in Japan on March 15, 1967, on a double bill with Chiisai Tôbôsha. Attendees were given Gyaos glider cutouts made out of construction paper and paper toy versions of Gamera and Barugon. A Manga adaptation was published in Shōnen comics as a special volume release. As a publicity stunt, a press conference was held featuring Gyaos promoting its involvement with the film, however, the stunt angered reporters called to the conference. The split car was displayed at the conference with Reiko Kasahara behind the wheel. The film was never released theatrically in the United States, and was released directly to television by American International Television in 1967 as Return of the Giant Monsters.

In 2015, a digital restoration of the film was screen at the Tokyo International Film Festival.

=== Critical response ===
Variety reviewed the film after a screening in Tokyo, stating, "Gyaos is true to his own nature. Which is more than one can say for the now thoroughly domesticated and completely undignified Gamera. Perhaps it is because the man inside the suit swooping on wires or carefully crunching models of Nagoya is a born actor. Gyaos exhibits a strong sense of timing. A good deal of projection and consequently, generates an amount of empathy. He is obviously a Stanislavski monster." Ishirō Honda, director of various Godzilla films, sent Takahashi a new years card with high praises for the film.

Film historian and critic Stuart Galbraith IV wrote in DVD Talk that the film "strikes a pretty fair balance between epic scenes of destruction and the material more emphatically geared to children," with its "dark but outrageously unrealistic humor further support[ing] Yuasa-Takahashi's child-like perspective." Writing in AllMovie, critic Donald Guarisco described the film as "tailor-made fun for the Japanese monster film crowd," and featuring "swift, colorful direction" that provides "a good example of the kid-friendly fun this [Gamera] series is all about."

=== Home media ===
In 1987, the Axis dub was released on VHS and television as Gamera vs. Gaos by Sandy Frank. In 2004, Image Entertainment bundled Pan and scan versions of the AIP–TV versions of Gamera vs. Gyaos and The Magic Serpent on DVD. In September 2010, Shout! Factory bundled the Japanese version, the Axis English dub, and the AIP–TV version on DVD, along with Gamera vs. Viras. In 2011, Shout! Factory included the Mystery Science Theater 3000 episode featuring the Sandy Frank version of the film on the MST3K vs. Gamera DVD collection.

In 2014, Mill Creek Entertainment bundled the Japanese version with other Gamera titles on Blu-ray and DVD. In 2020, the Japanese version, the Axis English dub, and the AIP-TV version were included in the Gamera: The Complete Collection Blu-ray box set released by Arrow Video, which included all 12 films in the franchise.

The film was released on 4K UHD Blu-ray in Japan on November 21, 2025, along with Gamera, the Giant Monster and Gamera vs. Barugon. The new 4K remasters were supervised by Shinji Higuchi (special effects director of the Heisei Gamera trilogy) and veteran color timing technician Ogura Shunichi.

== Legacy ==
Following this film, numerous variants of Gyaos were introduced over the course of the series, including Space Gyaos in Gamera vs. Guiron, Super Gyaos in Gamera: Guardian of the Universe, Hyper Gyaos in Gamera 3: Revenge of Iris and a new version in Gamera the Brave, referred to as "Original Gyaos" in supplementary material. In 2015, a new iteration of Gyaos was featured in proof-of-concept footage for a potential Gamera reboot. Yukijirō Hotaru decided to play a recurring role in the Heisei Gamera trilogy due to Yukitarō Hotaru's involvement in Gamera vs. Gyaos.

Gamera vs. Gyaos was one of the few films featured twice on Mystery Science Theater 3000 (both times as Gamera vs. Gaos), the first time as part of the initial KTMA series (episode 6) and again in Season 3 (episode 8).
