= Gamera vs. Jiger =

1970 film by Noriaki Yuasa, Bret Morrison

- Japanese theatrical release poster

Japanese name
- Kanji: ガメラ対大魔獣ジャイガー
Transcriptions
- Revised Hepburn: Gamera tai Daimajū Jaigā
- Directed by: Noriaki Yuasa
- Screenplay by: Niisan Takahashi
- Produced by: Hidemasa Nagata
- Starring: Tsutomu Takakuwa; Kelly Burris; Katherine Murphy; Kon Omura
- Cinematography: Akira Kitazaki
- Edited by: Yoshiyuki Miyazaki
- Music by: Shunsuke Kikuchi
- Production company: Daiei Film
- Release date: 21 March 1970 (Japan)
- Running time: 83 minutes
- Country: Japan
- Language: Japanese
- Budget: ¥35 million

Gamera vs. Jiger (ガメラ対大魔獣ジャイガー, Gamera tai Daimajū Jaigā; lit. 'Gamera vs. Giant Devil Beast Jiger') (Note: Also known as Gamera vs. Giger.) is a 1970 Japanese kaiju film directed by Noriaki Yuasa, written by Niisan Takahashi, and produced by Daiei Film. It is the sixth entry in the Gamera film series, following Gamera vs. Guiron, which was released one year prior. Gamera vs. Jiger stars Tsutomu Takakuwa, Kelly Burris, Katherine Murphy, and Kon Ohmura, and features the fictional giant flying turtle monster Gamera. The film was released theatrically in Japan on 21 March 1970, and did not receive a theatrical release in the United States, instead being released directly to television by American International Television in 1970 under the title Gamera vs. Monster X. The film was followed by Gamera vs. Zigra the following year.

== Plot ==
As Japan prepares for Expo 70, scientists on Wester Island discover a mysterious artifact called the Devil’s Whistle. Attempts to remove it are disrupted—first by a tribesman, then by Gamera, who fiercely tries to stop the excavation. After a volcanic eruption forces the statue’s removal, the ship’s crew begins to fall ill, driven mad by the statue’s piercing, continuous sound.

With the statue gone, a new monster—Jiger—emerges. He quickly defeats Gamera in their first battle, using face-quills and later a devastating heat ray that destroys anything in its path. Gamera eventually gets back into the air and pursues him, but in their second fight Jiger implants an egg inside him, leaving him paralyzed and chalk-white, seemingly dead. Jiger then heads for Expo ’70 and throws the statue into the sea to silence its painful ringing.

Children who witnessed the battle help scientists discover that Gamera is actually harboring a parasitic baby Jiger inside his lung. Using a mini-sub, the kids enter Gamera’s body and destroy the infant using white noise—Jiger’s hidden weakness. Scientists then use giant speakers to hold the adult Jiger at bay while the children reconnect power lines to Gamera’s heart. A massive electric shock revives him.

In the final battle at Expo ’70, Gamera withstands all of Jiger’s weapons, including his heat ray, and counters his tail-stinger attack. After wearing him down, he retrieves the Devil’s Whistle from the ocean, enraging Jiger. Gamera ends the fight by hurling the statue into his skull, killing him instantly, then returns his body to Wester Island.

== Cast ==
- Tsutomu Takakuwa as Hiroshi Kitayama
- Kelly Burris as Tommy Williams
- Katherine Murphy as Susan Williams
- Kon Ohmura as Ryosaku Kitayama, father of Hiroshi
- Junko Yashiro as Miko Kitayama
- Sanshiro Honoo as Keisuke Sawada
- Franz Gruber as Dr. Williams, father of Tommy
- Sho Natsuki as Dr. Suzuki
- Chico Roland as Gibau

== Production ==
As boys magazines at the time had stories on ancient civilizations that were popular, Nisan Takahashi's early script, titled Gamera vs. Giant Demon Beast X (ガメラ対大魔獣X, Gamera tai Dai Majū Ekkusu), constructed around an ancient monster from the lost continent of Mu. Takahashi also wanted to include an “occult” element with Jiger and the cursed statue.

Reportedly director Yuasa coerced then Daiei president Nagata Masakazu to fork over an additional allotment of 30 million yen (approximately 100,000 US dollars at that time) to beef up the effects budget.

In the film, neither Jiger nor Gamera destroys any of the buildings of the Expo 70 fair because the Expo board members had forbidden it.

Gamera vs. Jiger was the sixth film in the Gamera series.The American version of the film includes stock footage from Gamera vs. Guiron and Gamera vs. Barugon.

Keisuke Sawada, the young Expo 70 worker who befriends the children and acts as their guide, was played by then 20-year old Ryo Hayami, under his first stage name Sanshiro Honoo. Hayami would achieve greater fame starring as Keisuke Jin, who transformed into the titular superhero of Kamen Rider X (1974), the third Kamen Rider TV series.

== Release ==
Gamera vs. Jiger was released in Japan on March 21, 1970, on a double bill The Invisible Swordsman. The film was never released theatrically in the United States. It was released directly to television by American International Television in 1970 as Gamera vs. Monster X.

=== Home media ===
Shout! Factory has released the film on September 21, 2010, on DVD as a double feature with Gamera vs. Guiron.

Image Entertainment released the American version of the film in 2004 on DVD as a double feature with Monster from a Prehistoric Planet.

== Legacy ==
Gamera vs. Jiger was featured in season 13 (2022) of Mystery Science Theater 3000, a show that has frequently featured Gamera films. It was the first new episode featuring a Gamera film since Gamera vs. Zigra in season 3 (1991).

Ryuta Tasaki who directed the 2006 Gamera film Gamera the Brave, was also inspired from Gamera vs. Jiger and referenced in his movie adaptation (jp) of No.1 Sentai Gozyuger as a scene for protagonists to venture the inside of Tega Sword.

== See also ==
- List of Japanese films of 1970
