= Daikaijū Tōkyō ni arawaru =

Giant Monster Appears in Tokyo
- DVD cover
- Directed by: Takeshi Miyasaka
- Written by: Masaru Nakamura
- Produced by: Hiroyuki Tsuji; Masao Kimura; Yasuhiko Furusato; Jun Watanabe
- Starring: Kaori Momoi; Hirotarō Honda; Yumi Yoshiyuki
- Cinematography: Masaaki Sakae
- Edited by: Masaru Nakamura
- Music by: Daisuke Suzuki
- Production companies: Yoshimoto Kogyo; Marubeni; Tokyu Agency
- Distributed by: Shochiku
- Release date: September 26, 1998 (Japan)
- Running time: 101 minutes
- Country: Japan
- Language: Japanese

Giant Monster Appears in Tokyo (Japanese: 大怪獣東京に現わる, Hepburn: Daikaijū Tōkyō ni arawaru) is a 1998 Japanese film directed by Takeshi Miyasaka.

== Overview ==
Unlike the company's representative kaiju film The X from Outer Space (1967), Giant Monster Appears in Tokyo and What to Do with the Dead Kaiju? (2022) are comedy films avoiding direct depictions of rampaging giant monsters.

This film involves off-screen appearances of two reptilian monsters, a "fire-breathing dinosaur-esque lizard" and a "jet-powered flying turtle", as a direct parody to both Godzilla and Gamera, along with its title reminiscent of the Gamera-related Warning from Space (1956). Several stakeholders from these kaiju franchises also participated in the 1998 film.

Shochiku's The Next Generation: Patlabor (2014) introduced a presumed etymological reference to the film, "Giant Monster Appears in Atami", which is also a reference to various kaiju and tokusatsu productions most notably Warning from Space (1956) by Daiei Film and Gappa: The Triphibian Monster (1967) by Nikkatsu.

== Cast ==
- Kaori Momoi as Kimie Tadokoro
- Hirotarō Honda as Tsuguo Tadokoro
- Hideo Takamatsu as Osawa Hikojiro
- Yumi Yoshiyuki as Ryōko Sakurazawa
- Tomorowo Taguchi as Michio Hori
- Riki Takeuchi as Momotarō
- Yuko Oshima as a festival girl
- Masaru Nakamura as Konta

== Reception ==
=== Awards ===
20th Yokohama Film Festival

- Won: Best Supporting Actress - Yumi Yoshiyuki
