= Nezura 1964 =

2020 film by Hiroto Yokokawa

- Theatrical release poster

Japanese name
- Kanji: ネズラ1964
Transcriptions
- Revised Hepburn: Nezura Ichikyūrokuyon
- Directed by: Hiroto Yokokawa
- Written by: Hiroto Yokokawa; Kensaku Sakai
- Based on: Giant Horde Beast Nezura
- Produced by: Hiroto Yokokawa; Kazuma Yoneyama; Takuma Asai; Avery Guerra
- Starring: Yukijirō Hotaru; Mai Saitō; Mach Fumiake; Shirō Sano
- Music by: Takuya Imahori; Michiaki Watanabe
- Production companies: 3Y Film; Kadokawa
- Distributed by: 3Y Film
- Release dates: December 19, 2020 (Tokyo); January 16, 2021 (Japan)
- Running time: 55 minutes
- Country: Japan
- Language: Japanese
- Budget: ¥3.5 million

Nezura 1964 (ネズラ1964, Nezura Ichikyūrokuyon) is a 2020 Japanese crowdfunded kaiju biopic film directed by Hiroto Yokokawa. The film was based on Daiei Film's unfinished 1964 Gamera precursor Giant Horde Beast Nezura (jp) and stars Yukijirō Hotaru as a character based on the president of Daiei, Mai Saitō, Mach Fumiake, and Shirō Sano. Giant Horde Beast Nezura itself was a successor of a scrapped project Giant Sea Demon Dagora, and the director Yokokawa produced a 2021 short film based on it by reusing props of Nezura 1964.

== Plot ==
On July 25, 1963, assistant director Kazuaki Yukawa introduces a documentary about an upcoming Daiei film. At the company's first meeting, producer Shigeo Nagano, stresses the need to come up with a fresh idea to complement their existing franchises. Special effects director Yonejiro Tsukaji suggests a lavish kaiju movie. CEO Yuichi Nagano is impressed and approves it, although director Mitsuo Muraoka points out that one of their competitors just released its own kaiju movie.

Tsukaji and Yukawa, tasked with deciding what kind of monster should star in the film, visit a zoo in Tokyo. However, none of the animals appeal to them. After Yuichi watches a movie featuring birds, he suggests that the monsters should be based on mundane animals. He and Tsukaji settle on rats and announce their decision at an August 5 meeting. The title will be "Giant Horde Beast Nezura", featuring a group of gigantic rats as its premise. Muraoka is skeptical that the rats will cooperate, so Tsukaji agrees to shoot some test footage.

Daiei begins filming test footage on October 10, but the staff find controlling the domesticated rats and decide to use wild rats instead. Tsukaji captures wild rats in downtown Tokyo, which succeed as expected.

Yuichi is delighted with the footage and allows the project to proceed, with Muraoka assigned as the director and Tsukaji as the special effects director. Tsukaji meets with sculptor Takiyama to commission a human-sized Nezura prop. Yuichi records a public announcement of the film, which is scheduled for a January release.

To keep up with Muraoka's insistence on sets covered in rats, Daiei offers the public ¥50 for every rat they bring in. Cages of the animals soon fill a small warehouse. Takiyama completes the prop, and Daiei staff create a Mammoth Nezura puppet as well. The film's actors, including Utsumi, Michiko Ogata, Junko Kamei, and Schmidt, assemble for a table-read. Screenwriter Hasebe's story features the United States and the Soviet Union announcing a joint lunar expedition. Mikami Space Laboratory's experiments on rats, intended to create a new type of space food for the astronauts, instead produce ravenous monsters. The Nezura escape the lab and rampage through Tokyo. A Mammoth Nezura emerges and battles the smaller rats, with the JSDF ultimately killing them all.

However, the rats eventually become infected with fleas and disease, with many crew members forced to wear masks in filming. Tsukaji watches a televised interview between a famous special effects director and his son Azuma, who agree that the public's attention has shifted from film to television, and Tsukaji's mood sours further. Citizens living near the studio interrupt the shoot on October 25 in protest, concerned about the rats spreading disease.

On November 3, Daiei receives a stern letter from the Bureau of Social Welfare and Public Health recommending the termination of the film and the rats. A morose Yuichi complies. After Tsukaji immolates the rats the following day, he stands silently amidst one of the sets, then crushes one of the buildings in a fit of rage. Yukawa reflects in his documentary that even though Giant Horde Beast Nezura was a failure, it taught him a lot about filmmaking.

Yukawa visits Yuichi, who has been in poor health, at his home on January 3. The CEO happens upon a small spinning firework and Yukawa offers to light it. The firework's motion gives Yuichi an idea for a new monster spinning through the sky, and they rush off to Daiei to get to work.

== Cast ==
- Yukijirō Hotaru as Nagano (modeled after Masaichi Nagata)
- Kazuma Yoneyama as Yukawa (modeled after Noriaki Yuasa)
- Norman England as Schmidt
- Ippei Ōsako as Shigeo (modeled after Hidemasa Nagata)
- Yoshirō Uchida as Takiyama
- Shirō Sano as Azuma
- Noboru Sato as Muraoka (modeled after Mitsuo Murayama)
- Mai Saitō as Junko
- Mach Fumiake as Monto
- Masanori Kikuzawa as Tsukaji (modeled after Yonesaburo Tsukiji)
- Himawari Ono as Sachiko
- Nōmaru Abe as Mikami
- Bin Furuya as Oyaji (modeled after Eiji Tsuburaya)
- Akira Ohashi as Mammoth Nezura

== Production ==
On December 7, 2020, Takuya Imahori and Michiaki Watanabe were announced as the film's composers.

The plot focused on the production of Giant Horde Beast Nezura before the Gamera franchise, and various members of film crews and casts have previously participated in Gamera productions. Its theme song Nezura March by Mach Fumiake was also a homage to Gamera March.

Filming of Nezura 1964 also utilized live rats to accurately recreate shooting conditions of Giant Horde Beast Nezura, but complied with animal welfare by combining with CGI and other special effects.

No.	Title	Lyrics	Music	Length
1.	"Nezura March"	Hiroto Yokokawa	Takuya Imahori	1:21
2.	"Giant Horde Beast Nezura"	Takeyuki Tanokura	Michiaki Watanabe	1:40
Total length:				3:01

== Release ==
=== Theatrical ===
Nezura 1964 was first released in Tokyo released on December 19, 2020. A month later, it was released nationwide on January 16, 2021.

=== Home media ===
The film was released to DVD in Japan in January 2021 and will soon be released in North America by SRS Cinema.

== Giant Horde Beast Nezura ==
Giant Horde Beast Nezura (大群獣ネズラ, Daigunjū Nezura; lit. 'The Great Rat Swarm') is an unfinished 1964 kaiju film directed by Mitsuo Murayama and produced by Daiei Film.

The project was influenced by the concerned rat plague since 1949, and its developers were inspired by Hitchcock’s The Birds "animal attack" concept, but decided to replace birds with giant rats.

In response to multiple issues from using live rats for filming, the film's production was shut down by the health department because the wild brown rats used were escaping the set and had the potential to transmit disease to the surrounding area. Consequently, a mass mortality of rats, a labor dispute and staff resignations, and near-fatal dust mite allergy on Michio Mikami and others were simultaneously evoked, and Mikami, who developed a rodent allergy, was traumatized due to this incident; he later participated in Gamera and various tokusatsu productions as a member of the Ex Productions, however he thoroughly avoided to associate with any rat kaijin (jp) for Kamen Rider and other dramas.

Despite the project's cancellation, the studio was not dissuaded from producing more kaiju films, and released Gamera, the Giant Monster which reused Giant Horde Beast Nezura's sets. On the other hand, Noriaki Yuasa repeatedly turned down Daiei's requests to reuse Nezura's model for his Gamera films.

== Giant Sea Demon ==
As a precursor of Giant Horde Beast Nezura, there existed previous attempts by Daiei to produce its own monster movie since 1962, the year in which the company yielded the kaiju film The Whale God.

The company was originally aiming to produce Unsinkable Battleship Musashi (Japanese: 不沈艦武蔵, Hepburn: Fuchinkan Musashi), a 70 mm film following Buddha (1961) and The Great Wall (1962). This project was eventually terminated due to a failed consensus to borrow a battleship from West Germany, with the purpose of replicating the Japanese battleship Musashi. In response to this, Daiei launched a tokusatsu project Giant Sea Demon (Japanese: 大海魔, Hepburn: Daikaima), in which a semiaquatic, giant mole monster "Moguran" the strange marine beast (Japanese: 怪海獣モグラン, Hepburn: Kaikaijū Moguran) (Note: Moguran was supoosed to be a "kaijū" (Japanese: 海獣), and the term itself signifies marine mammals in the Japanese.) appears and battles a "Giant Octopus" (Japanese: 大ダコ, Hepburn: Ōdako). This again faced a course change, and its production was resumed as Giant Sea Demon Dagora (Japanese: 大海魔ダゴラ, Hepburn: Daikaima Dagora), alternatively as "Giant Demon Beast Dagora" (Japanese: 大魔獣ダゴラ, Hepburn: Daimajū Dagora), a kaiju film theming a giant octopus "Dagora" (Japanese: ダゴラ).

Following the failure to film it by using a live octopus, Giant Sea Demon Dagora became a basis for Giant Horde Beast Nezura, which eventually got derailed by repeating the same mistake to use live animals.

In 1962, the year in which the project Giant Sea Demon was initially launched, Toho released King Kong vs. Godzilla, and Ōdako a recurring octopus kaiju made its debut. There are several similarities between the both kaiju projects; the two octopus monsters by both companies share the Japanese name "Ōdako", with the Toho character also having a similar subtitle "Sea Demon" (Japanese: 海魔, Hepburn: Kaima), and both Giant Sea Demon Dagora and the 1962 Godzilla film utilized live octopuses for filming. Following Daiei's termination of the Dagora project, Toho produced Dogora in 1964, where one of its English title was Dagora, the Space Monster, while the same name was also considered as Ōdako's alias for Godzilla Final Wars (2004). (Note: Production of the 2004 film involved the Nippon Eizō Creative, a special effect company which has also contributed in the Gamera franchise.)

In the Gamera franchise, the term "Giant Demon Beast" (Japanese: 大魔獣, Hepburn: Daimajū) was also used for the Japanese title of Gamera vs. Jiger (1970), and Zedus, the antagonist kaiju of Gamera the Brave (2006) was also similarly entitled as "Sea Demon Beast" (Japanese: 海魔獣, Hepburn: Kaimajū) where the reptilian monster was also initially designed as a cephalopod.

=== Yatsuashi ===
Following Nezura 1964, the director Yokokawa reused its props for a 2021 short film Yatsuashi (Japanese: ヤツアシ), which was based on Giant Sea Demon Dagora. It depicts a gigantic octopus to cause a havoc in Tokyo, where the monster was originally a titular company employee, who had been suffering strenuous power harassments and went missing at the seashore on the previous day. While originally scheduled to be released theatrically, it was eventually released on YouTube. Akin to both its motifs and Nezura 1964, the production was filmed with a live octopus.

== Legacy ==
A 2026 crowdfunded short film Uchinā Heroes introduced a brief reference to Nezura 1964.

== See also ==
- Gamera
- Daimajin
- The Whale God
- Yokai Monsters
- Warning from Space
- The Great Buddha Arrival
