= Gamera: Super Monster =

1980 film by Noriaki Yuasa

- Theatrical release poster

Japanese name
- Kanji: 宇宙怪獣ガメラ
Transcriptions
- Revised Hepburn: Uchū Kaijū Gamera
- Directed by: Noriaki Yuasa
- Screenplay by: Niisan Takahashi
- Produced by: Masaya Tokuyama; Shigeru Shinohara; Hirokazu Ohba
- Starring: Mach Fumiake; Yaeko Kojima; Yoko Komatsu; Keiko Kudo; Koichi Maeda (actor); Toshie Takada
- Cinematography: Michio Takahashi; Akira Uehara
- Edited by: Tamotsu Taga; Zenko Miyazaki; Tatsuji Nakashizu; Shoji Sekiguchi
- Music by: Shunsuke Kikuchi
- Production company: Daiei Film
- Distributed by: New Daiei
- Release date: March 20, 1980 (Japan)
- Running time: 92 minutes
- Country: Japan

Gamera: Super Monster (宇宙怪獣ガメラ, Uchū Kaijū Gamera; lit. 'Space Monster Gamera') (Note: Also known as Gamera: The Super Monster.) is a 1980 Japanese kaiju film directed by Noriaki Yuasa and produced by Daiei International. It is the eighth film in the Gamera film series and its first installment by Tokuma Shoten, following the release of Gamera vs. Zigra in 1971, while it is a new story and doesn't share the lore with the previous Showa films.

Gamera: Super Monster was distributed by New Daiei, and was released theatrically in Japan on 20 March 1980. Being a commercial failure, it didn't contribute to revive the franchise and was followed by Gamera: Guardian of the Universe in 1995, which would mark the beginning of the franchise's Heisei period.

== Plot ==
When the evil alien Zanon comes to enslave Earth, all hope seems lost. The Earth's resident superheroes, the Spacewomen, are powerless to stop him. They must enlist the help of a young boy who has a special connection with the giant turtle Gamera, who is potentially a pond slider magically turned into the kaiju by the Spacewomen. The Friend of All Children then battles a legion of kaiju sent by Zanon; Gyaos, Zigra, Viras, Jiger, Guiron, and Barugon.

After successfully defeating villainous monsters, Gamera sacrifices himself in the end to destroy Zanon once and for all and to protect Earth one last time, but his exact fate remains unclear.

== Cast ==
- Mach Fumiake as Kilara
- Yaeko Kojima as Marsha
- Yoko Komatsu as Mitan
- Keiko Kudo as Giruge
- Koichi Maeda (actor) as Keiichi
- Toshie Takada as Keiichi's mother
- Makoto Ikeda as Keiichi's friend
- Kisao Tobita as a driver
- Yasuhiro Saito as an announcer
- Osamu Kobayashi as Captain (voice)
- Katsura Bunraku the 9th - Police officer at Kameari Park, alternatively credited as "Officer Ryotsu"
  - The character is based on Kankichi Ryotsu, the protagonist of the below-mentioned manga series KochiKame: Tokyo Beat Cops. (Note: Gamera franchise characters and Daimajin have been referenced within the manga series, and Kankichi's anime voice actor LaSalle Ishii appeared in Gamera 2: Attack of Legion (1996).)
- Hirotsugu Hayashi, Tetsuki Toyosumi, Hideki Kobayashi - Juvenile delinquents
- Tadashi Nakamura - Narration

== Production ==
Gamera: Super Monster was the first post-Daiei installment of the franchise by Tokuma Shoten and was produced as an attempt to help Daiei get out of its turbulent financial situation. The Totsu ECG System was utilized for filming.

It contains extensive stock footages of the entire Showa Gamera film series, as well as Space Battleship Yamato and Galaxy Express 999, where the producer Masaya Tokuyama also participated in the promotion of Galaxy Express 999 (1979). KochiKame: Tokyo Beat Cops and Kinnikuman were also briefly featured and parodied. The spaceship of "Zanon" and its introduction scene are identical to that of Star Destroyer from Star Wars (1977), while its video game adaptation involved a character based on Gyaos. There are additional parodies to Godzilla, Superman, Jaws, Close Encounters of the Third Kind, Shane, and so on.

Most footage of Gamera and his enemies are re-edited stock footages from previous films due to budgetary and schedule constraints and insufficient materials; this movie would have costed at least ¥1 billion if it was entirely a new production. This direction to rely on Daiei Film properties was also shaped by the success of the 1979 Ultraman video film (jp) by Akio Jissoji (Note: Jissoji has also directed productions having connections to the Heisei Gamera trilogy; Ultra Q The Movie: Legend of the Stars, Ultraman Max, and Tokyo: The Last Megalopolis.) which contributed in the revival of the Tsuburaya Productions franchise. Both films were also double featured in Nagoya.

Various materials were lost during the turmoil when Daiei Film was officially declared bankrupt in December 1971, where a number of suits and props and equipments were destroyed by frustrated and distressed employees (either Noriaki Yuasa himself or other staffs). Newly produced tokusatsu scenes to involve Gamera were almost exclusively filmed with the props of flying Gamera, which were preserved at the Ex Productions (Note: Ex Productions was launched due to the success of Gamera, the Giant Monster and participated in not only Gamera and Daimajin but also various other tokusatsu productions afterwards.) and evaded the riot. This model is the last extant Showa Gamera prop, and was subsequently used for the promotion of Gamera: Guardian of the Universe (1995), Its production faced additional constraints such as music licenses, and the film didn't utilize music and songs from previous films, including the iconic Gamera March.

Tamotsu Taga, one of former Daiei Film staffs who had abandoned the near-bankrupt company for P Productions due to the aftermaths of the scrapped project Giant Horde Beast Nezura prior to Gamera, the Giant Monster (1965), participated in Gamera: Super Monster as an editor along with additional crews from P Productions such as Shigeru Shinohara and Hirochika Muraishi.

== Release ==
Gamera: Super Monster was released theatrically in Japan on March 20, 1980, where it was distributed by New Daiei. The franchise has prioritized reducing competitions against Toho's Godzilla franchise for financial constraints, and the film was released during the temporal cease of Godzilla film productions, which was caused by the box office result of Terror of Mechagodzilla (1975) and the demise of the Second Kaiju Boom due to the 1970s energy crisis.

The film was double featured with the Astro Boy movie (jp) in Tokyo and Osaka and some other areas, and the aforementioned Ultraman video film (jp) by Akio Jissoji in Nagoya.

== Home media ==
=== Elvira's Movie Macabre ===
The movie was featured on a 1983 episode of Elvira's Movie Macabre, which Shout! Factory released on a DVD in 2007 together with the 1967 British film They Came from Beyond Space. The two films can each be watched with or without the Elvira host segments.

=== Cinema Insomnia ===
In 2007, Gamera: Super Monster was shown on the horror hosted television series Cinema Insomnia. Apprehensive Films later released the Cinema Insomnia episode onto DVD in both regular and special "Slime Line" editions.

=== Shout! Factory release ===
Shout! Factory acquired the rights from Kadokawa Pictures for all eight of the Showa era Gamera films and have issued the uncut Japanese versions on DVD for the first time in North America. These "Special Edition" DVDs were released in sequential order, starting with Gamera, the Giant Monster (1965) on May 18, 2010.

== Reception ==
Gamera: Super Monster was a commercial failure. Its box office gross was presumably affected by the time period where the kaiju genre itself stagnated; the Second Kaiju Boom was short lived as the entire tokusatsu genre suffered multiple factors like the 1970s energy crisis.

Daiei's demise shortly after Gamera vs. Zigra (1971) led to cancelleations of the next film allegedly titled Gamera vs. the Two-Headed Monster "W" and an unnamed television series, while the former was redeveloped into a respective short film and a graphic audio story Gamera vs. Garasharp in the 1990s. This makes Gamera: Super Monster the sole film entry in over two decades, and the franchise had been again inactive until the Gamera: Guardian of the Universe (1995), although there had been several additional cancelled projects during the dormancy.

== Legacy ==
The 1994 manga series Giant Monster Gamera by Hurricane Ryu (Note: Hurricane Ryu played Gamera in Noriaki Yuasa's last work Cosplay Warrior Cutie Knight series,) serves as a sequel to Gamera: Super Monster: Gamera was artificially resurrected after the incidents in the film and gained the physical appearance and abilities of the Heisei Trilogy incarnation of the character.

Mach Fumiake, who played Kilara and sang the theme song Love for Future in Gamera: Super Monster, later participated in the 2020 biopic film Nezura 1964 as an actress and the singer of Nezura March, the films theme song which is a homage to Gamera March.

In 2026, the aforementioned flying model became a part of the crowdfunding project to preserve respective Gamera suits used for the Heisei trilogy and Gamera the Brave, for being the sole extant Showa Gamera prop.
