= Shigeo Tanaka =

Japanese film director

- Born: January 7, 1907; Komikado, Katori, Chiba, Japan
- Died: January 18, 1992 (aged 85)
- Occupation: Film director
- Years active: 1931-1984

Shigeo Tanaka (田中 重雄, Tanaka Shigeo) (January 7, 1907 – January 18, 1992) was a Japanese film director. Tanaka directed the second instalment of the Japanese film series Gamera, and also directed Kenshin, The Great Wall and Typhoon Reporter.

== Selected filmography ==
- Tokai no hatoba (1932)
- Haha (1939)
- Aijin no chikai (1940)
- The Battle of Hong Kong (1942)
- Kyohan sha (1958)
- Tokyo onigiri musume (1961)
- Kenshin (1961)
- The Great Wall (1962)
- Typhoon Reporter (1963)
- Furin (1965)
- I'll Cry Alone (1965)
- Gamera vs. Barugon (1966)
- Woman Gambling Den (1966)
- The Suitors (1967)
- The Woman Gambler and the Nun (1968)
- The Woman Gambler's Supplication (1968)
- Onna tobakushi jūban shōbu (1969)
