= Gamera vs. Guiron =

1969 film by Noriaki Yuasa

- Japanese theatrical release poster

Japanese name
- Kanji: ガメラ対大悪獣ギロン
Transcriptions
- Revised Hepburn: Gamera tai Daiakujū Giron
- Directed by: Noriaki Yuasa
- Screenplay by: Niisan Takahashi
- Produced by: Hidemasa Nagata
- Starring: Nobuhiro Kajima; Christopher Murphy; Miyuki Akiyama; Yuko Hamada
- Cinematography: Akira Kitazaki
- Edited by: Yoshiyuki Miyazaki
- Music by: Shunsuke Kikuchi
- Production company: Daiei Film
- Release date: March 21, 1969 (Japan)
- Running time: 82 minutes
- Country: Japan
- Budget: ¥24 million

Gamera vs. Guiron (ガメラ対大悪獣ギロン, Gamera tai Daiakujū Giron; lit. 'Gamera vs. Giant Evil Beast Guiron') is a 1969 Japanese kaiju film directed by Noriaki Yuasa, written by Niisan Takahashi, and produced by Daiei Film. It is the fifth entry in the Gamera film series, following Gamera vs. Viras, which was released the previous year. Gamera vs. Guiron stars Nobuhiro Kajima, Miyuki Akiyama, Christopher Murphy, Yuko Hamada, and Eiji Funakoshi. The film was released theatrically in Japan on March 21, 1969. It did not receive a theatrical release in the United States, but was released directly to American television that year by American International Television under the title Attack of the Monsters. The film was followed by Gamera vs. Jiger the following year.

== Plot ==
While scanning the skies through their telescope, two young boys, Akio and Tom, spy a flying saucer descending into a nearby field. Stunned, bewildered, and bemused, they tell Akio's mother what they have seen, but she dismisses their story as childish nonsense. The next day, the two boys — with Akio's younger sister, Tomoko, in tow — cycle to the site to investigate. Enthralled, Akio and Tom manage to steal into the spaceship. But then, without warning, the ship takes off, leaving Tomoko behind. It soars into outer space toward a field of asteroids, which sends the boys into a panic. However, Gamera (obviously aware of the boys' plight) appears and clears a path for the ship through the asteroids. The spaceship, flying near the speed of light, leaves Gamera behind and transports the boys to an unknown planet, where it lands on the outskirts of an alien city. Suddenly, a silver "Space" Gyaos appears, menacing the ship and the two young boys. Just before the creature attacks, a second, bizarre monster — whose head resembles a Bowie knife — emerges from an underground lair and attacks the Space Gyaos. The Space Gyaos emits a beam that reflects off the new creature's blade-shaped head and cuts off its own right leg. After the Space Gyaos attempts to retreat, the knife-headed creature lunges and chops off the Space Gyaos' left wing, before cutting off its right wing. The creature then cuts the helpless Space Gyaos' head off and brutally cuts the body into smaller pieces before retreating back to its lair.

Akio and Tom explore a portion of the alien city and meet the planet's only inhabitants: two beautiful women, named Barbella and Florbella, who explain that their planet, known as "Terra", orbits the sun directly opposite the earth, which is why it has never been discovered by Earth's astronomers. Furthermore, Terra is facing extinction; not only is the planet growing cold, but the Space Gyaos are taking it over and the two women are the last of their kind. The knife-headed monster, which the Terrans call "Guiron", is their last defense against the Space Gyaos.

Barbella and Florbella suddenly incapacitate Tom and Akio and put them into restraints. Using their super-technological devices, the alien women probe the boys' minds, in the process learning about Gamera and his soft spot for children. It is revealed that the Terran women are cannibals that plan to feed on the boys' brains in order to absorb their knowledge. In preparation to extract Akio's brain for their nourishment, the women shave the child's head. On a rescue mission, Gamera lands on Terra in search of the boys. The women deploy Guiron to attack the giant turtle. Guiron plans to cut Gamera in half, but Gamera grabs one of Guiron's front legs and bites into it. Guiron tries to shake off the towering tortoise. Wrapping his tail onto a monolith, Gamera throws Guiron into a canyon, causing his knife-head to be stuck. Gamera uses his flame breath on Guiron. Guiron uses his shurikens to penetrate Gamera's cheeks. Gamera tries to heal his wounds by grabbing ice-like boulders. Guiron uses his shurikens again and this time Gamera uses a long boulder to ricochet the shurikens into Guiron's own body. Guiron trudges away, while Gamera tumbles into a lake unconscious and on his back.

Tom wakes up and manages to free Akio, but, during their escape attempt, unintentionally releases Guiron. No longer under the aliens' control, Guiron rampages through the Terran city — even attacking his own mistresses as they attempt to flee to Earth. The knife-headed creature slices the spacecraft in half, mortally injuring Barbella; Florbella kills Barbella as she relates that useless members of their society are euthanized. While Guiron attacks the base where the boys are imprisoned, Gamera awakes and renews his assault on the alien creature, ultimately ramming Guiron's head into the ground. Florbella attempts to flee on a rocket, but the boys launch missiles that destroy her rocket and she dies as a result. Gamera catches one of the missiles and spears Guiron into his shuriken base. Gamera uses his flame breath on Guiron again where the missile is; the missile then explodes, cutting Guiron in half. Gamera uses his flame breath to weld the alien spacecraft back together and carries the ship, with the two boys on it, back to Earth. On Earth, the boys are returned to their mothers and they all say goodbye to Gamera as he flies off into the sky.

== Cast ==
- Nobuhiro Kajima as Aki
- Christopher Murphy as Tom
- Miyuki Akiyama as Tomoko
- Yuko Hamada as Kuniko
- Eiji Funakoshi as Dr. Shiga
- Kon Ohmura as Kondo
- Edith Hanson as Tom's mother
- Umenosuke Izumi as Gamera
- Eizo Kaimai as Guiron
- Nisan Takahashi as Space Gyaos

== Release ==
Gamera vs. Guiron was released in Japan on 21 March 1969. The film was never released theatrically in the United States. It was released directly to television by American International Television in 1969 as Attack of the Monsters. The film was followed by Gamera vs. Monster X.

== Reception ==
From retrospective reviews, AllMovie referred to the film as "one of the lesser Gamera entries" noting a smaller budget, the film's recycling of scenes from previous films, and "some atypically shoddy rear-projection effects." The review described Christopher Murphy as "a terrible actor." Though asserting that "completists may still want to check [Gamera vs. Guiron] for a few reasons," such as Guiron's "unique design" and the film's Hansel & Gretel-like storyline, "Ultimately, the mix of saccharine kid-movie elements and often surrealistic monster movie shocks will not be to everyone's taste"

== Legacy ==
Gamera vs. Guiron was one of the few films featured twice on Mystery Science Theater 3000, the first time as part of the initial KTMA series (episode 8) and again in Season 3 (episode 12).
