= Yonesaburo Tsukiji =

- 築地 米三郎
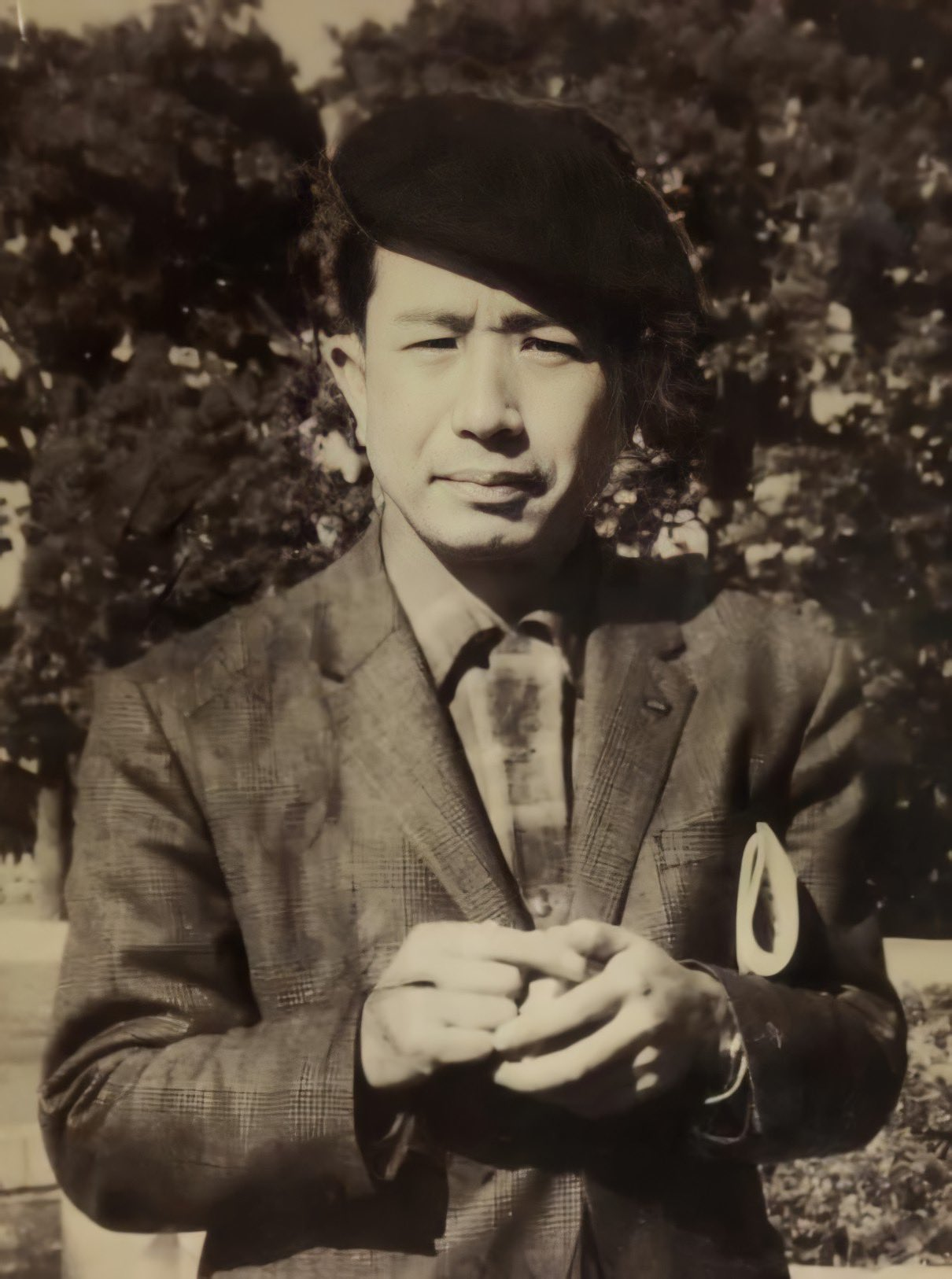
- Tsukiji in 1958
- Born: 5 September 1923; Ōimachi, Shinagawa, Tokyo, Japan
- Died: 30 March 2012 (aged 88)
- Occupations: Special effects director, cinematographer, producer
- Years active: 1946–2009
- Known for: Warning from Space; Gamera, the Giant Monster

Yonesaburo Tsukiji (Japanese: 築地 米三郎, Hepburn: Tsukiji Yonesaburō; September 5, 1923 – March 30, 2012) was a Japanese special effects director who worked on eleven films in a career spanning twenty-one years. Tsukiji co-designed Gamera with Masao Yagi, Noriaki Yuasa, and Akira Inoue.

== Biography ==
=== Early life ===
Tsukiji was born on September 5, 1923, in Ōimachi, Shinagawa, Tokyo. Tsukiji's family lived across the street from the Oikan movie theater, he went to the movies nearly every day from the age of 5 to 6.

== Filmography ==
=== Special effects ===
- Warning from Space (1956) [with Tōru Matoba]
- Panther's Eye (1956)
- Nichiren and the Great Mongol Invasion (1958)
- The Precipice (1958)
- Hanran (1959)
- Ten Dark Women (1961)
- The Great Wall (1962)
- Giant Horde Beast Nezura (1964)
- Money Talks (1964)
- Gamera the Giant Monster (1965)
- Gamera: Super Monster (1980)

=== Producer ===
- Hatsukoi: Natsu no Kioku (2009)

== Legacy ==
Immediately after the bankruptcy of Daiei Film, Kiyoshi Kawamura published a novel The Flute of Gomera, featuring Tsukiji as the protagonist to depict difficulties of tokusatsu productions by the company.

A fictional character based on Tsukiji would appear in the 2021 film Nezura 1964.
