= Hidemasa Nagata =

Japanese film producer

- 永田 秀雅
- Born: 1925; Kyoto, Japan
- Died: October 3, 2017 (aged 92)
- Occupations: Film producer, Daiei vice-president
- Years active: 1955–1971
- Father: Masaichi Nagata

Hidemasa Nagata (永田 秀雅, Nagata Hidemasa) (1925 – October 3, 2017) was a Japanese film producer and served as vice-president of Daiei Film. His father Masaichi Nagata was president of Daiei.

== Filmography ==
- Brooba (1955)
- Punishment Room (1956)
- The Crowded Streetcar (1957)
- Kisses (1957)
- The Invisible Man vs. The Human Fly (1957)
- Giants and Toys (1958)
- Kyohan sha (1958)
- Being Two Isn't Easy (1962)
- Giant Horde Beast Nezura (unfinished 1964)
- Gamera, the Giant Monster (1965)
- Gamera vs. Gyaos (1967)
- Gamera vs. Viras (1968)
- Gamera vs. Guiron (1969)
- Gamera vs. Jiger (1970)
- Gamera vs. Zigra (1971)

== See also ==
- Nezura 1964
