= Niisan Takahashi =

Japanese screenwriter

- 高橋 二三
- Born: 高橋 幸人 (Takahashi Yukito); February 3, 1926; Tamamura, Sawa, Gunma, Japan
- Died: May 5, 2015 (aged 89); Yokohama, Kanagawa, Japan
- Occupations: Screenwriter, novelist
- Years active: 1954–1995

Niisan Takahashi (高橋 二三, Takahashi Nīsan) (born Yukito Takahashi (高橋 幸人, Takahashi Yukito); February 3, 1926 – May 5, 2015) was a Japanese screenwriter.

== Partial filmography ==
=== Film ===
- Ginza no onna (1955)
- The Motherless (1955)
- The Wind-of-Youth Group Crosses the Mountain Pass (1961)
- Gamera, the Giant Monster (1965)
- Gamera vs. Barugon (1966)
- Gamera vs. Gyaos (1967)
- Gamera vs. Viras (1968)
- Gamera vs. Guiron (1969)
- Gamera vs. Jiger (1970)
- Gamera vs. Zigra (1971)
- Gamera: Super Monster (1980)

=== Television ===
- Thunder Mask (1972) [episodes 19, 21]
- Zatoichi Monogatari (1974)

=== Original net animation ===
- Gamera Rebirth (2023) [uncredited]

== Bibliography ==
- Gamera vs. Phoenix (ガメラＶＳ不死鳥 (フェニックス), Gamera bāsasu Fenikkusu) (1995) (ISBN 4-09-440411-2)
