= Five-Company Agreement =

The Five-Company Agreement (五社協定, Gosha Kyōtei) was an agreement signed 10 September 1953 between five major Japanese entertainment companies: Shochiku, Toho, Daiei, Shin-Toho, and Toei.

Although nominally it prohibited hiring away a cosignatory company's actors and directors, in reality intention of the agreement was to prevent actors from being hired away by Nikkatsu, which had recently begun making films. It was executed mainly under the leadership of Masaichi Nagata, then president of Daiei.

== History ==
After the Second World War, Nikkatsu (which had been primarily active in the hotel business and such) began taking steps to return to movie production under president Kyusaku Hori, constructing Tamagawa Film Studio (in reality, Nikkatsu Film Studio) and trying to hire directors and actors away from the five companies. To oppose this, those companies bound under Nagata's leadership agreed to the following:

1. Hiring away actors and directors from each other would be forbidden.
2. The occasional lending of actors and directors was also done away with.

In September 1958, with Nikkatsu (which had resumed film production in 1954) also participating in the agreement, it became the Six-Company Agreement; in 1961, it once again became the Five-Company Agreement with the dissolution of Shin-Toho due to bankruptcy. On 1 November of that same year, the five companies ceased to offer films for television, and restricted television performances of films with company-exclusive actors. Because of this, the five companies, as well as the TV stations, began to promote many actors in the new medium.

Deprived of shows with which to fill their schedule, television channels began to broadcast American films instead of Japanese films. As a distribution system had not yet been established, and there being little foreign money in public circulation at the time, the brokers known as "transporters" came onto the scene. The president of Pacific Television Corporation Akira Shimizu (清水昭 Shimizu Akira), said to have been a politician's secretary, emerged as the ringleader. Given the demand for American films, inevitably the demand for organization of Japanese-side staff (production/scriptwriting/film development) rose; and, as at that time there were also points in which TV channels' know-how was lacking, there became no work other than that in inferior circumstances, particularly voice acting in Japanese dubs.

However, Japanese film industry, which reached its peak in terms of attendance in 1958, has since gone into decline. The main reason for this was the influence of television. The popularity of television increased following major events such as the wedding of the Crown Prince (Akihito) and the 1964 Summer Olympics, and by the mid-1960s, the penetration rate reached approximately 90% for each household. Following the bankruptcy of Shintoho in 1961, Daiei Film, which had been the leader of the five-company agreement, went bankrupt in 1971. A primary factor was the death of star actor Ichikawa Raizō VIII (Note: He was the spouse of Masako Ōta, Masaichi Nagata's adoptive daughter.) to illness in 1969. As a result of all of these factors, the exclusive actor system for star actors at film companies collapsed in 1971, and the five-company agreement practically came to an end.

== See also ==
- Taro Marui - a Daiei Film actor who committed a suicide due to the constraints from the agreement.
- Jiro Tamiya - a Daiei Film actor who was named by Masaichi Nagata after Kenjiro Tamiya. He was subsequently dismissed in 1968 as a result of his resistance to Nagata. Nagata exiled Tamiya from the film industries with the Five-Company Agreement, and this significantly affected Tamiya's career. He eventually committed a suicide in 1978.
