= Gappa: The Triphibian Monster =

Gappa
- Theatrical release poster
- Directed by: Haruyasu Noguchi
- Screenplay by: Iwao Yamazaki; Ryuzo Nakaishi
- Story by: Akira Watanabe
- Produced by: Hideo Koi
- Starring: Tamio Kawachi; Tatsuya Fuji; Yoko Yamamoto; Kōji Wada
- Cinematography: Muneo Ueda
- Edited by: Masanori Tsujii
- Music by: Ryutaro Omori
- Production company: Nikkatsu
- Release date: April 22, 1967 (Japan)
- Running time: 84 minutes (Japanese) / 90 (international)
- Country: Japan
- Language: Japanese
- Budget: ¥500 million

Gappa: The Triphibian Monster (Japanese: 大巨獣ガッパ, Hepburn: Daikyojū Gappa; lit. 'Giant Beast Gappa') is a 1967 Japanese kaiju film directed by Haruyasu Noguchi. The film is about a group of Japanese reporters who discover an infant monster called a Gappa on Obelisk Island. The reporters cage the creature and take it to Japan where it becomes a media attraction. This angers the natives of the island and Gappa's full-grown parents, who head toward Japan to find their child. Its plot virtually duplicates that of the 1961 British film Gorgo.

The film was released theatrically as Daikyojū Gappa in Japan in 1967, but only received a direct-to-television release in the United States as Monster from a Prehistoric Planet. It received positive reviews from Variety and Phil Hardy.

== Plot ==
An expedition from Tokyo heads to Obelisk Island, which the greedy Mr. Funazu, owner of Playmate Magazine, wants to turn into a resort. The island natives welcome the expedition, but two members, Hiroshi and Itoko, venture into a forbidden area despite the pleas of a native boy named Saki. They enter a cavern blocked by a fallen statue and find a giant egg, out of which hatches a baby "bird-lizard" monster, referred to as "Gappa". The natives plead with the skeptical scientists not to take the baby away, lest it anger the baby's parents, but they do so anyway. Inside the caverns, Gappa's two parents rise from the subterranean waters beneath the volcano, destroying everything in their path. Saki, the only survivor, is rescued by an American Navy fleet and brought to Japan.

Meanwhile, Gappa makes global headlines and is experimented on by scientists. To the shock of the expedition members, two giant flying creatures appear over Sagami Bay. The Gappa parents ravage cities looking for their offspring and prove impervious to military weapons. Hiroshi, Itoko, Saki, and expedition scientist Professor Tonooka try to persuade the headstrong Mr. Funazu to let the baby go and return it to its parents. Mr. Funazu finally lets Gappa go back to its parents. Then the three go back to Obelisk Island.

== Cast ==
- Tamio Kawachi as Hiroshi Kurosaki
- Yoko Yamamoto as Itoko Koyanagi
- Yuji Odaka as Daize Tonoka
- Kōji Wada as Machida
- Tatsuya Fuji as George Inoue
- Keisuke Yukioka as Mr. Funazu, Magazine owner
- Zenji Yamada as Captain of the Kamome-Maru
- Bumon Kahara as Chief of Obelisk Island
- Kōtarō Sugie as Reporter #1
- Saburō Hiromatsu as Hosoda
- Binnosuke Nagao as Commander Riku
- Masaru Kamiyama as Professor
- Kokan Katsura as Saburo Hayashi
- Shirô Oshimi as Oyama
- Yoko Oyagi as Aihara
- Sanpei Mine as Islander #1
- Takashi Koshiba as Reporter #2
- Kensuke Tamai as Islander #2
- Minoru Sato as Reporter #3
- Kiyoshi Matsuoka as Islander #3
- Hiroshi Itoh as Reporter #4
- Hiroshi Chō as Transport Aircraft Captain
- Masanori Machida as Saki
- Mike Daneen as Petty Officer
- Ruich Fidancer as Captain of the Sea Angels
- Paul Schumann as Professor McDonald
- Toshizō Kudō as a party guest in Atami
- Kōji Yashiro as a JSDF officer
- Hiroshita Atami and Takashi Konagaias as Gappa (male)
- Ken Misugi as Gappa (female)
- Shiro Tonami as Baby Gappa

== Production ==
=== Studio system ===
Although by different companies, Gappa: The Triphibian Monster and The X from Outer Space by Shochiku were produced and released simultaneously. Both shared similarities in production systems, being produced by the company Japan Tokusatsu Production, (Note: Japan Tokusatsu Production was founded by Eiji Tsuburaya's acquaintances such as Keiji Kawakami, Akira Watanabe, and Yukio Odagiri.) involved Eiji Tsuburaya's teams, and being among non-Daiei kaiju works that received tax-based governmental loans, (Note: Toho and Toei Company intentionally avoided applying for the loans, while independent production studios such as Ishihara International Productions were unable to secure it due to their fiscal conditions.) as a result of Masaichi Nagata's (Note: Nagata was a former Nikkatsu employee, the Daiei Film president, and one of authors of the kaiju Gamera. Eiji Tsuburaya once attempted to join Daiei Film due to his early association with Nagata. Meanwhile Tsuburaya's involvements in Gappa: The Triphibian Monster and The X from Outer Space were apparent to filmmakers, it wasn't publicly announced, as the Japanese cinema had faced constraints from the Six-Company Agreement (Five-Company Agreement) led by Nagata himself.) attempt to export Japanese films for the purpose of obtaining foreign currencies to restore the declining Japanese cinema; this consequently shaped the First Kaiju Boom, an influential social phenomena that involved both films and became the basis for the Second Kaiju Boom and the Yōkai / Kaiki Boom.

=== Writing ===
The year 1967 was the height of Japan's “Kaiju Boom” and many Japanese film studios were doing their own monster film. Nikkatsu jumped onboard and decided to do their own film. Several ideas were hatched but did not bear fruit. There was Giant Monster Gigant (大怪獣ギガント, Daikaiju Giganto): A giant alien lifeform resembling a spider arrives on Earth and causes destruction. Giant Squid Monster Arkitius (大烏賊アーキティウス, Oiki Akitiusu): During World War II, a Nazi U-boat is attacked by a giant squid called Arkitius. Giant Monster Momonra (怪獣モモンラ, Daikaiju Momonra): Japan is attacked by a giant mutated flying squirrel. And Reigon: Devil of the Seabed (海底の魔王レイゴン, Kaitei no mao Reigon): A giant manta ray dubbed “Reigon” appears one day and wreaks havoc across the world and then fights a giant iguana. This was the fourth and final unmade film in a series of concepts Nikkatsu Company had before making Gappa. This concept got the furthest into development out of the four scrapped projects, receiving a plot synopsis, speculative screenplay, and kaiju ideas. Planning was done by Hideo Kodama; the draft was written by Shunichi Yukimuro and Ryuzo Nakanishi.

=== Filming ===
In an interview with the film's screenplay writers, Gen Yamazaki and Ryuzo Nakanishi, they explained that the film got government financing of about 500,000,000 yen (about $1.4 million), which was ten times the average of a Nikkatsu film. Eisei Koi, who was the producer of the film was classmates with politicians in the Diet and used his political power to get the money.

Principal photography on Gappa lasted for about 40 days, twice the time that director Haruyasu Noguchi usually took to shoot a film.

=== Special effects ===
The monster suits and effects in the film were created by Akira Watanabe, a former employee of Toho who has contributed in the Godzilla franchise, Ultra Q, and other kaiju and tokusatsu productions.

== Release ==
Gappa was released in Japan on April 22, 1967, as Daikyojū Gappa. The film was never released theatrically in the United States. American International Television first offered the film as Monster from a Prehistoric Planet in the "15 New Science Fiction" television package beginning in 1967; the film may have premiered on television in 1968.

The English language dialogue track in the film's English version is credited to William Ross.

Stuart Galbraith IV, author of Japanese Science Fiction, Fantasy and Horror Films described the American version of the film as poorly dubbed and that home video versions prior to 1994 are poor dupes taken from a 16mm television print. The film has been released on DVD by various companies including Alpha Video, Mill Creek Entertainment, Tokyo Shock and Image Entertainment. Gappa the Triphibian Monster was released on Blu-ray in the United States on February 25, 2020, with both Japanese and English language audio as well as English subtitles.

== Reception ==
In contemporary reviews, Variety stated that the creature Gappa makes an "auspicious debut and reveals itself as "best monster" so far". Variety concluded that "these are the only Japanese monsters one might like to see again" and that "Most effects are well done, a few superb" noting the destruction of Atami as one of the highlights.

In retrospective reviews, Phil Hardy discussed the film in his book Science Fiction (1984). The review complimented the film, noting that "the effects are excellent and the script is worthy of a witty children's comedy." Stuart Galbraith IV described the film as an unauthorized remake of the 1961 British film Gorgo. Galbraith described the human characters as "colorless reporters and scientists" and that "none of the actors is especially appealing." Galbraith commented on Akira Watanabe's effects, opining that they were "okay but lack the perfectionist drive of Eiji Tsuburaya's work."

== Legacy ==
- In the Showa era, Gappa was often featured along with other kaiju and tokusatsu characters from different franchises in various boy's and manga magazines in Japan, such as references made within the popular manga series KochiKame: Tokyo Beat Cops. Gappa has made additional non-Nikkatsu appearances such as the twenty-fourth episode of the British comedy program Red Dwarf, and briefly co-appeared along with various kaiju characters from other franchises in Natsuhiko Kyogoku's novel series USO Makoto Yōkai Hyaku Monogatari.
- About four decades after the Gappa: The Triphibian Monster, Nikkatsu produced another kappa-themed kaiju film Death Kappa (2010). Additionally, the company yielded a related yuru-kyara.
- Mamoru Oshii's The Next Generation: Patlabor (2014-2015) has an episode "Giant Monster Appears" as a tribute to various classic kaiju and tokusatsu productions especially Gappa: The Triphibian Monster; it introduced an embedded narrative called "Giant Monster Appears in Atami", and the kappa-based kaiju and the choice of the location (Atami) are outright references to Gappa: The Triphibian Monster, where even the director Oshii and others have directly referred the character to as "Gappa".
- Shusuke Kaneko originally intended to introduce Gappa in his 1985 live-action film adaptation of Minna Agechau as it being a Nikkatsu film, however Gappa's suits were long lost. In response to this, Gamera was the following candidate due to the relationship between Nikkatsu and Daiei Film, but the latter declined the request to protect the character's public image, and eventually used one of rental monsters instead from the Gamera-related Ex Productions. Kaneko made connections with both Daiei Film and Tsuburaya Production through this film, influencing his subsequent kaiju and tokusatsu career, such as the Heisei Gamera trilogy and several Ultra Series entries.
- Models of Gappa were also used in a Nikkatsu Roman Porno film Amorous Family: Like a Fox and a Racoon (1972) by Noboru Tanaka, and a comedy kaiju film Yuzo: The Biggest Battle in Tokyo (2022) by Yoshikazu Ishii.

== See also ==
- List of films in the public domain in the United States
- List of Japanese films of 1967
- List of science fiction films of the 1960s
- Gorgo and Gamera - kaiju productions either directly or indirectly influenced the productions of Gappa: The Triphibian Monster and The X from Outer Space.
