= Gamera, the Giant Monster =

1965 film by Noriaki Yuasa

- Theatrical release poster

Japanese name
- Kanji: 大怪獣ガメラ
Transcriptions
- Revised Hepburn: Daikaijū Gamera
- Directed by: Noriaki Yuasa
- Screenplay by: Niisan Takahashi
- Produced by: Masaichi Nagata; Hidemasa Nagata
- Starring: Eiji Funakoshi; Michiko Sugata; Harumi Kiritachi; Junichiro Yamashita
- Cinematography: Nobuo Munegawa
- Edited by: Tatsuji Nakashizu
- Music by: Tadashi Yamanouchi
- Production company: Daiei Film
- Distributed by: Daiei
- Release date: November 27, 1965 (Japan)
- Running time: 78 minutes
- Country: Japan
- Language: Japanese
- Budget: ¥40 million

Gamera, the Giant Monster (大怪獣ガメラ, Daikaijū Gamera; lit. 'Giant Monster Gamera') is a 1965 Japanese kaiju film directed by Noriaki Yuasa, with special effects by Yonesaburo Tsukiji. Produced and distributed by Daiei Film, it is the first film in the Gamera franchise and the Shōwa era. The film stars Eiji Funakoshi, Harumi Kiritachi, and Junichiro Yamashita. In the film, authorities deal with the attacks of Gamera, a giant prehistoric turtle unleashed in the Arctic by an atomic bomb.

The success of The Birds and Toho's Godzilla films influenced studio head Masaichi Nagata to produce a similar film. In 1964, Daiei attempted to produce Nezura, with Yuasa directing. However, the project was shut down by the health department, since the project was to have used dozens of live rats. Nagata then conceived Gamera to replace Nezura on the schedule. Due to a low budget and tight schedule, Yuasa was forced to use outdated equipment, faulty props, and faced belittlement from colleagues. Yuasa was determined to complete the film with Daiei's resources, despite brief talks of hiring Tsuburaya Productions to finish the film.

Gamera, the Giant Monster was theatrically released in Japan on November 27, 1965. A localized version with new footage was theatrically released in the United States on December 15, 1966 by Harris Associates, Inc. and World Enterprises Corporation as Gammera the Invincible. It was the only Gamera film in the Shōwa era to be given a theatrical release in the United States. The film was followed by Gamera vs. Barugon, released on April 17, 1966.

== Plot ==
In the Arctic, an unknown aircraft is shot down by an American jet fighter. The aircraft crashes and its cargo, an atomic bomb, explodes. The explosion awakens a giant prehistoric turtle with tusks. Japanese scientists on an expedition nearby, Dr. Hidaka, his assistant Kyoko and reporter Aoyagi, are given a stone tablet by an Inuit chief, who explains that the creature is called Gamera. Gamera destroys the expedition ship and escapes. Sightings of flying saucers soon surface in Japan. In Sagami Bay, Toshio (a boy recently forced to release his pet turtle) and his family encounter Gamera, who attacks their lighthouse. However, Gamera saves Toshio from falling to his death. Toshio becomes attached to Gamera after finding his pet turtle gone, believing it turned into Gamera.

Upon returning to Japan, Dr. Hidaka, Kyoko, and Aoyagi accompany the military when Gamera approaches a geothermal power plant. Despite attempts to prevent its approach, Gamera proceeds to attack the power plant and devours the flames around it. Dr. Hidaka consults with Dr. Murase and the military recommends using experimental freezing bombs. The bombs postpone Gamera's assault as the military rigs the area with explosives and succeeds in turning the monster on its back. Gamera pulls in its limbs, expels flames, and takes flight, spinning around like a flying saucer. Toshio and his sister Nobuyo visit Dr. Hidaka while staying in Tokyo with their uncle. Toshio explains to Dr. Hidaka his belief that Gamera is lonely and not evil. Dr. Hidaka, meanwhile, has observed that Gamera consumes fossil fuels and may seek atomic bombs for their energy. Meanwhile, disasters and accidents start to occur: Koto Ward is struck by flash floods and ships collide in Tokyo Bay. Dr. Hidaka claims that the cause may be Gamera hiding in the bay.

An international scientific conference is called and decides to use the "Z Plan", based at Oshima Island. Gamera lands at Haneda Airport and proceeds to wreak havoc in Tokyo. Toshio and his family evacuate, but Toshio runs away. The military keep Gamera at bay at an oil refinery by feeding it petroleum via trains, while the Z Plan continues preparations. As Nobuyo searches for her brother, Toshio makes attempts to breach restricted areas to see Gamera until he is caught at Oshima. Dr. Murase informs Nobuyo of Toshio's safety. The Z Plan is eventually completed and Gamera is lured to Oshima by lighting an oil slick path. However, an approaching typhoon blows the fire out. Aoyagi starts a bonfire to lure back Gamera, but it is also extinguished by the typhoon. A nearby volcano erupts, successfully luring Gamera back. The next day, the Z Plan is put into action: Gamera is lured into the nose cone of a giant rocket and launched to Mars. The world celebrates and Toshio tells Dr. Hidaka he will become a scientist so he can visit Gamera. Toshio bids the monster farewell.

== Cast ==
- Eiji Funakoshi as Dr. Hidaka
- Michiko Sugata as Nobuyo Sakurai (Note: "Nora" in the Sandy Frank English dub)
- Harumi Kiritachi as Kyoko Yamamoto (Note: "Catherine" in the Sandy Frank English dub)
- Junichiro Yamashita as Aoyagi (Note: "Alex" in the Sandy Frank English dub)
- Yoshiro Uchida as Toshio Sakurai (Note: "Kenny" in the Sandy Frank English dub)
- Michiko Sugata as Nobuyo Sakurai
- Yoshiro Kitahara as Mr. Sakurai
- Jun Hamamura as Dr. Murase
- Kenji Ôyama as Minister of Defense
- Abdo Apanai as American ambassador
- Munehiko Takada as Soviet ambassador
- Yoshio Yoshida as Inuit Chief

=== American version ===
- Albert Dekker as the Secretary of Defense
- Brian Donlevy as Gen. Terry Arnold
- Diane Findlay as Sgt. Susan Embers
- John Baragrey as Captain Lovell
- Dick O'Neill as Gen. O'Neill
- Mort Marshall as Jules Manning
- Alan Oppenheimer as Dr. Contrare
- Steffen Zacharias as Senator Billings
- Thomas Stubblefield as J.T. Standish
- Walter Arnold as the American ambassador
- George Hirose as the Japanese ambassador
- Louis Zorich as the Soviet ambassador

Cast taken from A History of Gamera.

== Production ==
=== Crew ===
- Noriaki Yuasa – director
- Yonesaburo Tsukiji – special effects director
- Akira Inoue – production designer
- Sandy Howard – director (American footage)
- Ken Barnett – executive producer (American version)
- Julian Townsend – cinematographer (American footage)
- Ross–Gaffney – editor (American version)
- Murray Rosenblum – sound (American version)
- Hank Aldrich – art director (American version)
- Sid Cooperschmidt – assistant director (American version)

Personnel taken from A History of Gamera.

=== Early attempts ===
Daiei Film originally intended to take a monster film "Giant Sea Demon Dakora" (Japanese: 大海魔ダコラ, Hepburn: Daikaima Dakora) to feature a giant octopus, however the project was cancelled due to difficulties to use an actual octopus for filming.

Due to the success of The Birds and Toho's Godzilla films, Masaichi Nagata, the then-President of Daiei Film, wanted to produce a similar film and developed Giant Horde Beast Nezura, a film that would have featured overgrown rats attacking Tokyo. The film project was assigned to Yonesaburo Tsukiji to direct the special effects and Noriaki Yuasa to direct the film, despite the studio thinking Yuasa was a "wash-out". Yuasa became attached to the film due to other directors refusing to accept the assignment, feeling that the film and its genre were beneath them and would have ended their careers.

Stop motion, mechanical props, and suitmation were initially used to portray the creatures, with Ryosaku Takayama building several prototypes and a radio controlled prop, but these were unsuccessful and the crew were forced to use live rats crawling over miniature cities. However, the rats were wild, uncooperative, and infested with fleas. Due to this, the health department forced the production to shut down. The cancellation of Nezura left Tsukiji's privately owned studio in debt. Nezura was originally billed as Daiei's "premiere monster movie" scheduled to be released for new years in 1964. Due to the resources that went into developing Nezura, Nagata was adamant in using those resources for a monster film.

=== Gamera ===
Nagata conceived the idea for Gamera in 1965 upon flying back home from the United States. According to screenwriter Niisan Takahashi, Nagata claimed to have envisioned a tortoise flying alongside his airplane or saw either an island shaped like a tortoise or a turtle-shaped cloud above a small island. During a monthly planning session, Nagata shared his tortoise vision with his staff and ordered them to create ideas for it. Producer Yonejiro Saito contacted Takahashi about potential ideas, to which Takahashi shared his first story treatment titled A Lowly Tortoise Flies Through the Sky. Takahashi then wrote a four-page treatment titled "Fire-eating Turtle Attacks Tokyo" (Japanese: 火喰いガメ 東京を襲う, Hepburn: Hikui Game Tōkyō wo Osou). After reading it, Nagata requested a full screenplay. Gamera's name was originally conceived as "Kamera", due to "kame" being the Japanese word for "turtle". However, the name was changed to "Gamera" due to "Kamera" sounding too close to the Japanese pronunciation for "camera". Special effects technician Ryosaku Takayama designed the turtle suit used in the film.

Yuasa inherited the Gamera assignment due to Nezura and was constantly belittled by studio execs and colleagues who believed the film would fail and would never compete with Godzilla. Yuasa took courses in special effects filmmaking and directed some of the film's effects in cooperation with Tsukiji. The script was still incomplete when the order was given to create the Gamera suit. Tsukiji's concept artwork was handed over to art director Akira Inoue and independent consultant Masao Yagi for further sketch designs and clay models. Yagi was assigned to build the suit and enlisted the aide of his father and associates from Toho's art department. The final suit weighed over 60 kilograms and was produced with plaster reinforced by latex. Gamera was portrayed by various "tough" members of Daiei's prop department. The Gamera suit was made to walk on all fours to make filming easier and distinguish it from other upright monster characters.

Gamera, the Giant Monster was the only film in the series shot in black-and-white. This was due to the budget being cut by the studio due to low confidence and the cancellation of Nezura. Yuasa stated that the first Gamera film had a budget of about ¥40 million and that the film went "over budget a little bit". Due to the film's low budget and tight schedule, the crew experienced various production issues: outdated equipment, insufficient electrical power to light up a sound stage for special effects filming, and faulty props. The flying Gamera prop burned through several wires it was attached to, causing it to crash. For the Arctic sequences, ice was delivered en masse by three trucks, however, the ice quickly melted and forced filming to be delayed for three days while the flooded set was being dried out. Yuasa received criticism from his own staff and there was consideration of hiring Tsuburaya Productions to complete the film. However, Yuasa refused and was determined to finish the film using Daiei's resources.

== English versions ==
The film was acquired and heavily altered by Harris Associates, Inc. and World Enterprises Corporation for its American release. Similar to the American release for Godzilla, King of the Monsters!, new footage was produced in New York City featuring American actors. This was done to replace footage from the Japanese version featuring poor performances by expats, poor English delivery by Japanese characters, and to further influence the plot from an American perspective. The American version restored shots deleted from the Japanese version and added an extra "m" to Gamera's name in order to prevent audiences from calling the monster "camera."

The Japanese footage was dubbed into English by Titra Studios, which featured the voices of Peter Fernandez, Corinne Orr, Jack Curtis, and Bernard Grant. Tadashi Yamanouchi's score was left intact while additional music recycled from film libraries was added to supplement the new footage. The song "Gammera" was written and recorded for the film by Wes Farrell and Artie Butler as "The Moons." Months after its release, a bootlegged instrumental version of the song was released in the U.K. as "Shing-A-Ling At the Go-Go." To impress exhibitors, World Enterprises claimed to have spent a million dollars in advertising the film. The film was released theatrically in December 1966 as Gammera the Invincible. In 1969, Harris Associates, Inc. re-released the film as a double feature with the Italian swashbuckler Mario Bava film Knives of the Avenger (1966); the pairing was advertised as "The Biggest... Most Frightening Science-Fiction Action-Show of the Century!".

In 1985, the Japanese versions of five Gamera titles, including the 1965 film, were acquired by Sandy Frank Film Syndication. While English dubs were recorded for the Japanese cuts of the other films by Hong Kong-based studios for export, the Japanese version of the 1965 film had no existing export dub and an entirely new English dub was commissioned and recorded at Anvil Studios in England, which featured the voices of Garrick Hagon and Liza Ross. This English dubbed version, simply titled Gamera, as well as the others released by Sandy Frank, were featured on Mystery Science Theater 3000.

== Release ==
=== Theatrical and television ===
Gamera, the Giant Monster was released in Japan on November 27, 1965., with some double features with New Kurama Tengu: Battle of Gojōzaka. The project was considered "cheap" and "destined to flop" among filmmakers partially due to the financial situation of Daiei Film. However, the film was a bigger hit than the studio expected, which led to a higher budget for the second film, Gamera vs. Barugon. A heavily altered version of the film was theatrically released in the United States on December 15, 1966 as Gammera the Invincible by Harris Associates, Inc. and World Enterprises Corporation. The American version runs at 86 minutes. At times, Gammera the Invincible was double-billed with Knives of the Avenger or The Road to Fort Alamo. After acquiring World Enterprises and their catalogue, National Telefilm Associates released a 16mm pan and scan version to television. Gammera the Invincible usually aired alongside the English versions of the Gamera films released by American International Television. It was this 16mm pan and scan version of the American cut that became the source for many public domain VHS and DVD releases in the United States and Canada.

=== Critical response ===
On Rotten Tomatoes, the film has an approval rating of 40% based on five reviews, with an average rating of 4.80/10. From contemporary reviews, Stuart Byron of Variety stated that Plan Z in the film was an "appropriate idea for Gammera, a film which can be rated as Grade Z" The review went on to note that the films script and acting was "thoroughly predictable and pedestrian level". From retrospective reviews, AllMovie gave the film a positive review complimenting its direction, special effects, and cinematography, stating, "All in all, Gammera the Invincible is a solidly-crafted, engaging monster mash - just make sure you see the original Japanese version". Keith Phipps from The A.V. Club stated "Gamera finds the perfect intersection between silly and cool, looking both dangerous and ridiculous as he tromps around. He’s no Godzilla, but he’s got his own thing going on." Arnold T. Blumberg from IGN awarded the film 6 out of 10, stating, "Gamera retains a kitschy charm but it was an inauspicious debut for a beloved icon." James McCormick from Criterion Cast called the film "a wonderful slice of schlock that you can watch again and again and appreciate the workmanship and love put into every scene."

Artist and filmmaker Tomio Sagisu (co-creator of Spectreman) claimed that Nagata stole the idea of Gamera from him. Sagisu was soliciting ideas for a kaiju television program to various studios in 1962, and screened a demo reel entitled The Colossal Turtle, which featured a stop-motion animated turtle monster that pulled its limbs, expelled flames, and took flight. Sagisu commented, "I screened my demo reel at Daiei and no matter what anybody may think, I'm sure they used this reference for Gamera." Years later, effects director Yonesaburo Tsukiji dismissed Sagisu's allegations and claimed that Masaichi Nagata's son, Hidemasa, conceived the idea for Gamera.

=== Home media ===
In 1987, Sandy Frank Film Syndication released the film on VHS as Gamera. This release featured a new English dub (separate from the 1966 American version) for the Japanese version and replaced the original soundtrack with a new score. Neptune Media released the original, unaltered Japanese version and the altered U.S. version on VHS in 1999. Alpha Video released a cropped public domain version of the U.S. version on DVD in 2003, along with other public domain Gamera films. In 2010, the Japanese version was released for the first time in North America on DVD by Shout! Factory.

In 2011, Shout! Factory included the Mystery Science Theater 3000 episode featuring the Sandy Frank version of the film on the MST3K vs. Gamera DVD collection. In 2014, the Japanese version was released on Blu-ray and DVD by Mill Creek Entertainment, bundled with other Gamera titles. In 2020, the Japanese version, the American version, and the Anvil Studios English dub were included in the Gamera: The Complete Collection Blu-ray box set released by Arrow Video, which included all 12 films in the franchise.

The film was released on 4K UHD Blu-ray in Japan on November 21, 2025, along with Gamera vs. Barugon and Gamera vs. Gyaos. The new 4K remasters were supervised by Shinji Higuchi (special effects director of the Heisei Gamera trilogy) and veteran color timing technician Ogura Shunichi.

== Legacy ==
Gamera, the Giant Monster is one of few films featured twice on Mystery Science Theater 3000 (both times as Gamera), the first as part of the initial KTMA series (episode 5) and again in Season 3 (episode 2).

Filmmaker Guillermo del Toro named the original Gamera film amongst his top five favorite kaiju films.

A character named "Baby Gamera", who has an appearance and abilities similar to Daiei's Gamera, appears in the manga and anime of Dragon Ball.

Later films would turn Gamera's characterization into a protector of children. This was due to a positive response from a scene in the 1965 film when Gamera saved Toshio, Yuasa commented, "It led to a great response and we received many letters from children. And so, Gamera became an ally of children in the end." Yuasa and screenwriter Niisan Takahashi were secretly hoping for that effect and were pleased when their intentions succeeded.

== See also ==
- List of Japanese films of 1965
