= Gamera vs. Viras =

1968 film by Noriaki Yuasa

- Theatrical release poster

Japanese name
- Kanji: ガメラ対宇宙怪獣バイラス
Transcriptions
- Revised Hepburn: Gamera tai Uchū Kaijū Bairasu
- Directed by: Noriaki Yuasa
- Screenplay by: Niisan Takahashi
- Produced by: Hidemasa Nagata
- Starring: Kojiro Hongo; Toru Takatsuka; Carl Craig
- Cinematography: Akira Kitazaki
- Edited by: Shoji Sekiguchi
- Music by: Kenjiro Hirose
- Production company: Daiei Film
- Release date: March 20, 1968 (Japan)
- Running time: 72 minutes
- Country: Japan
- Language: Japanese
- Budget: ¥24 million

Gamera vs. Viras (ガメラ対宇宙怪獣バイラス, Gamera tai Uchū Kaijū Bairasu; lit. 'Gamera vs. Outer Space Monster Viras') is a 1968 Japanese kaiju film directed by Noriaki Yuasa, with special effects by Yuasa. Produced by Daiei Film, it is the fourth entry in the Gamera film series, and stars Kōjirō Hongō, Tōru Takatsuka, Carl Craig, and Michiko Yaegaki, with Teruo Aragaki as Gamera. In the film, aliens abducts two boy scouts to coerce Gamera to attack Japan.

Gamera vs. Viras was theatrically released in Japan on March 20, 1968. It was followed by Gamera vs. Guiron, released March 21, 1969.

== Plot ==
A spaceship containing an expedition force from Planet Viras approaches Earth, with its occupants discussing their intentions to occupy the planet for its atmospheric Nitrogen, an element important to their survival. Gamera intervenes and destroys it; but before the ship is destroyed, the aliens broadcast a warning to their world, stating that Gamera is their enemy.

Later on Earth, a group of Boy Scouts are visiting an aquarium to see the scientists working on a two-man mini submarine. Japanese scout Masao and American scout Jim manage to talk their way aboard the sub. While in the water they spot Gamera, who engages in a little race with the boys. However, their hijinks come to an end when the second alien vessel envelops the both of them in its Super-Catch Ray. Gamera helps the boys to escape, but he remains trapped in the force field while the aliens scan his memories. Through analysis of Gamera's memories, the aliens learn of Gamera's weakness, his soft spot for children. Soon after, the field weakens and Gamera is freed. The aliens capture Jim and Masao, threatening to kill the boys, and demand Gamera obeys them. Powerless to stop them, Gamera surfaces and follows the UFO ashore, whereupon a mind control device is attached to the back of his head.

While aboard the spaceship, the boys continually try to escape. Gamera, however (under the influence of the aliens), is destroying dams and cities by the handful. Jim and Masao discover a squid-like creature, thinking that he is another captive of the aliens. In fact, he is the leader of the aliens. The boys help Gamera break free from the mind control device and succeed in escaping from the spaceship. Next Gamera attacks the spaceship. Grounded by Gamera, the aliens reveal that their human forms were just disguises, and that all of them look just like their leader. Under the leader's command, each of the aliens merge to form the giant monster Viras, who immediately engages Gamera in battle. Though Viras appears to have the upper hand, impaling Gamera through his belly with his spike-like mantle, Gamera kills Viras by flying high into the atmosphere, freezing Viras solid, then drops him towards the ocean, where he disintegrates upon impact. The boys and a crowd of adults celebrate Gamera's victory.

== Cast ==
- Kōjirō Hongō as Nobuhiko Shimada
- Tōru Takatsuka as Masao Nakaya
- Carl Craig as Jim Morgan
- Michiko Yaegaki as Mariko Nakaya
- Mari Atsumi as Junko Aoki
- Junko Yashiro as Masako Shibata
- Peter Williams as Dr. Dobie
- Kōji Fujiyama as JSDF Commander
- Chikara Hashimoto as Alien Leader
- Genzō Wakayama as Viras (voice)
- Teruo Aragaki as Gamera

== Production ==
Gamera vs. Viras was filmed at Daiei-Tokyo Studios. The film is the fourth in the Gamera film series. Yuasa cited the 1966 TV series Mission: Impossible as an influence on the film; Genzō Wakayama, who voiced Viras, also provided voice work on Mission: Impossible.

Daiei was in "financial trouble" at the beginning of 1968 and as a result cut the film's budget to ¥20 million, about $56,000 at the time. Footage from previous Gamera films was re-used in some parts of the movie. The film was shot in 25 days at Daiei's studios in Tokyo.

The agreement between Daiei and AI-TV stipulated that an American boy be cast as one of the two main child characters. No American child actors who spoke Japanese could be found at the time of production, so Carl Craig, the 11-year-old son of a US military officer stationed in Japan, was cast. Craig had no prior acting experience, and Gamera vs. Viras was his sole acting role.

== Release ==
Gamera vs. Viras was released in Japan on 20 March 1968. It was "such a big success in Japan" that the studio asked director Yuasa if he could produce two additional Gamera films per year. Although Yuasa said that that was impossible, it opened the door to additional Gamera films being made.

The film was never released theatrically in the United States. It was released directly to television by American International Television in 1969 as Destroy All Planets.

== Reception ==
In a retrospective review, AllMovie stated that the film offers "everything one expects from a massive zero-budget monster battle film" while also having "unintentionally brilliant quirky moments like the hypnotized army, Japanese men with glowing eyeballs, and a fiendishly fake-looking squid alien who wishes to attack Earth for its supply of nitrogen."

Phil Hardy, the British film critic, calls the move "a straightforward children's film" and that it "continues the shift of the monster genre towards a space opera context," which diminishes "the thematic interest of the genre."

American writer John LeMay said that "in terms of character utilization and script, Gamera vs. Viras could be the film where it all came together. But, in terms of budget and [special effects], it was the film where it all started to fall apart."

Filmmaker Hayao Miyazaki found the film memorable as a child but found it absurd for humanity to surrender to aliens for the safety of two boys, while Gamera vs. Viras and Miyazaki's Future Boy Conan bear similarities in plots as both were based on The Adventures of Tom Sawyer.
