= Angoulême International Comics Festival Prize for Inheritance =

The Prize for Inheritance (Prix du patrimoine) is one of the prizes awarded by the Angoulême International Comics Festival. This award recognizes a new French-language edition of great comics from the past. It has been awarded each year since 2004, from a list of 6-8 finalists.

== 2000s ==
- 2004: L'anthologie by Arthur Burdett Frost
  - M Le Magicien (Mandrake the Magician) by Massimo Mattioli
  - Ayako by Osamu Tezuka
  - Clifton by Raymond Macherot
  - Lycaons by Alex Barbier
  - Coup d'éclat by Yoshihiro Tatsumi
  - Social Fiction by Chantal Montellier
- 2005: Le Concombre masqué by Mandryka, Dargaud
  - Félix by Maurice Tillieux, Niffle
  - Barefoot Gen by Keiji Nakazawa, Vertige Graphic
  - Les Mythes de Cthulhu by Alberto Breccia, Rackham
  - Mystérieuse, matin, midi et soir by Jean-Claude Forest, L'Association
  - Ragnar le Viking by Eduardo Teixeira Coelho and Ollivier, Glénat
  - Spiderman intégrale 1969 by Stan Lee, John Romita, Sr. and John Buscema, Panini Comics
- 2006: Love and Rockets: Locas part 1 by Jaime Hernandez, Le Seuil
  - Comment décoder l’etircopyh by Jean-Claude Forest, L'Association
  - L’école emportée (The Drifting Classroom) part 6 by Kazuo Umezu, Glénat
  - Polly and Her Pals by Cliff Sterrett, L'An 2
  - Popeye by Elzie Crisler Segar, Denoël
  - Prince Norman part 1 by Osamu Tezuka, Cornélius
  - Snoopy et les Peanuts by Charles M. Schulz, Dargaud
- 2007: Sergent Laterreur by Gerald Freedman and Touïs, L'Association
- 2008: Moomin by Tove Jansson, Le Petit Lézard
- 2009: Onward Towards Our Noble Deaths by Shigeru Mizuki, Cornelius

== 2010s ==
- 2010: Paracuellos by Carlos Giménez, Audie
- 2011: Bab El Mandeb by Attilio Micheluzzi, Mosquito
- 2012: La Dynastie Donald Duck by Carl Barks, Glénat
- 2013: Krazy Kat vol. 1 by George Herriman, Les Rêveurs
- 2014: Cowboy Henk by Herr Seele et Kamagurka, Frémok
- 2015: San Mao, le petit vagabond by Zhang Leping, Fei
- 2016: Vater und Sohn by E. O. Plauen, Warum
- 2017: Le Club des divorcés (離婚倶楽部, Rikon kurabu) by Kazuo Kamimura, Kana
- 2018: Je suis Shingo by Kazuo Umezu, Le Lézard noir
- 2019: Les Travaux d'Hercule by Gustave Doré

== 2020s ==
- 2020: La Main Verte et autres récits by Nicole Claveloux and Édith Zha (Cornélius (maison d'édition))
- 2021: L'Éclaireur by Lynd Ward (Monsieur Toussaint Louverture)
