= Kataoka Ainosuke VI =

Japanese kabuki actor (born 1972)

- 六代目 片岡 愛之助
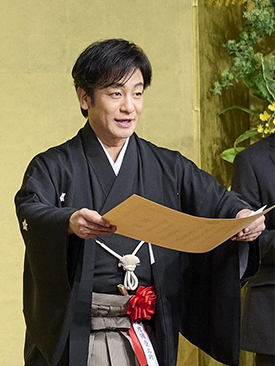
- Born: Hiroyuki Yamamoto (山元 寛之, Yamamoto Hiroyuki) (Note: While the stage names of all kabuki actors have retained traditional order (Surname-Givenname) on Wikipedia, birth names of those born after the Meiji Restoration are in Western order (Givenname-Surname).); March 4, 1972 (age 54); Sakai, Osaka, Japan
- Other names: Kataoka Chiyomaru; Kataoka Hiroyuki; Umemoto Senshō III
- Occupations: Actor; TV Host
- Years active: 1979–present
- Spouse: Norika Fujiwara (m. 2016)
- Children: 1
- Parent(s): Kataoka Hidetarō II (adoptive father) (Note: Son of Kataoka Nizaemon XIII, he was the younger brother of Kataoka Gatō V and the older brother of Kataoka Nizaemon XV and the only one of the three brothers who acted as Onnagata (i.e. he was a Kabuki actor who specialized in female roles).); Jōkō Yamamoto (biological mother) (Note: She and Toshimitsu Yamamoto were Ainosuke VI's biological parents and both owned a screw manufacturing factory in Sakai, Osaka (Ainosuke VI's hometown). Unfortunately, she died from an unspecified terminal cancer in 1999.); Toshimitsu Yamamoto (biological father) (Note: He and Jōkō Yamamoto were Ainosuke VI's biological parents and both owned a screw-making factory in Sakai (Ainosuke VI's hometown). Unfortunately, he died of subarachnoid hemorrhage, a rare bleeding disease, in 2000 (one year after the death of his wife Jōkō).)
- Relatives: Izumi Yamamoto (younger sister); Kataoka Gatō V (uncle); Kataoka Nizaemon XV (uncle); Kataoka Takatarō I (cousin) (Note: Eldest son of Kataoka Nizaemon XV.); Kataoka Shinnosuke I (cousin) (Note: Son of Kataoka Gatō V.); Kataoka Sennosuke I (cousin) (Note: Eldest son of Kataoka Takatarō I.)
- Website: Official website

Kataoka Ainosuke VI (Japanese: 六代目 片岡 愛之助, Hepburn: Rokudaime Kataoka Ainosuke; born March 4, 1972) is a Japanese actor, kabuki actor and TV host. His yagō is matsushimaya. His mon is the Oikake Go-mai Ichō. His current stage name is Ainosuke Kataoka. He is a renowned tachiyaku, specializing in both the aragoto and wagoto styles, which is rare, considering he hails from the Kansai area, where most kabuki actors specialize in the wagoto style.

== Filmography ==
=== Television ===
Year	Title	Role	Notes	Ref.
2013–20	Hanzawa Naoki	Shunichi Kurosaki	2 seasons	
2015–19	Seven Detectives	Takumi Yamashita	5 seasons	
2016	Sanada Maru	Ōtani Yoshitsugu	Taiga drama	
2018	Manpuku	Keisuke Kajitani	Asadora	
2020	Awaiting Kirin	Imagawa Yoshimoto	Taiga drama	
2021	Isoroku Yamamoto in London	Teikichi Hori	TV movie	
2022	The 13 Lords of the Shogun	Hōjō Munetoki	Taiga drama	
2025	Unbound	Urokogataya Magobei	Taiga drama	

=== Film ===
Year	Title	Role	Notes	Ref.
2014	Mother	Kazuo Umezu		
2015	The Land of Rain Trees	Toru Sawai		
2019	Whistleblower	Nobuhiko Sakado		
2021	First Gentleman	Tayori Sōma		
2023	Baian the Assassin, M.D.	Hikojirō		
2023	Baian the Assassin, M.D. 2	Hikojirō		
2023	Kingdom 3: The Flame of Destiny	Feng Ji		
2023	Fly Me to the Saitama: From Biwa Lake with Love	Akira Kashōji		
2024	Cells at Work!	Streptococcus pneumoniae		
2025	Lupin the IIIrd the Movie: The Immortal Bloodline	Muomu (voice)		

=== Dubbing ===
==== Live-action ====
Year	Title	Character	Voice dub for	Notes	Ref.
2021	Venom: Let There Be Carnage	Carnage	Woody Harrelson	Cletus Kasady voiced by Naoya Uchida	
2023	Haunted Mansion	Father Kent	Owen Wilson		

==== Animation ====
Year	Title	Character	Notes	Ref.
2024	Despicable Me 4	Maxime Le Mal		

== Awards ==
Year	Award	Category	Work(s)	Result	Ref.
2014	17th Nikkan Sports Drama Grand Prix	Best Supporting Actor	Hanzawa Naoki	Won	
