= Édith Zha =

French author and scriptwriter

- Born: 1945 (age 80–81)
- Writing career
- Language: French

Édith Zha (born 1945) is a French author and scriptwriter of comics for adults and children.

== Biography ==
Édith Zha was born in 1945. She studied philosophy. At the beginning of 1978, Edith Zha met Nella Nobili and they began to collect interviews with workers who loved each other. In 1979, they published Les femmes et l'amour homosexuel (Women and Homosexual Love).

She then became a proofreader in a publishing house. At the same time, she wrote scripts for adult and children's comics, illustrated by Nicole Claveloux. She also writes stories for children.

I know how to write dialogues, but I don’t know how to write a story with a beginning, an end, and events between them. So I called on Edith, who is a skilled writer. She told this strange story chapter by chapter, and then I cut it all up into boxes and text bubbles.

— Nicole Claveloux

== Works ==
- Les Femmes et l'amour homosexuel, with Nella Nobili, Hachette, 1979
- Morte-saison et autres récits (Dead Season and Other Stories), with Nicole Claveloux and Elisabeth Salomon.
- La maison sur la digue with Nicole Claveloux
- La Main Verte et autres récits (The Green Hand and Other Stories) with Nicole Claveloux. translated into English by Donald Nicholson-Smith

== Awards ==
- Angoulême International Comics Festival 2020: Prize for Inheritance with Nicole Claveloux
- Prix Artémisia 2020 du Matrimoine with Nicole Claveloux “for the magnificent republication of their works, La Main Verte et autres récits, published by Cornélius.”
