= Renata Viganò =

Italian writer

Renata Viganò (1900–1976) was an Italian writer best known for her neo-realist novel L'Agnese va a morire, published in 1949. She was an active participant in the Italian Resistance movement during World War II and included fictionalized accounts of her experiences as a partisan in her written work.

== Life ==
Viganò was born in Bologna on 17 June 1900. As an adolescent, she published two books of poetry, Ginestra in fiore (1912) and Piccola fiamma (1915).

Viganò was a member of the Italian Communist Party. During World War II, she participated in the resistance as a nurse and courier in Emilia-Romagna region. Together with her husband, Antonio Meluschi, she helped organize armed resistance activities in the Po Valley.

Viganò published several novels in the postwar period, including L'Agnese va a morire (1949) which tells the story of a washerwoman living in the countryside who joins the Communist resistance. The book became popular among Italian Communists at the time and established Viganò's position as a literary figure in the community. It won the Italian Viareggio Prize and was adapted into the film And Agnes Chose to Die in 1976 by Giuliano Montaldo.

In addition to L'Agnese, much of Viganò's other work also focuses on themes of labor, resistance and women's role in Italian society. She wrote two collections of short stories (including Matrimonio in brigata, 1976, published in English as Partisan Wedding) and a reference volume about women who participated in the resistance (Donne nella Resistenza). She also worked as a journalist, contributing to L'Unità, Rinascita, Corriere Padano and Noi donne.

In the post-war period, her house in via Mascarella in Bologna was frequented by intellectuals such as Pier Paolo Pasolini, Sibilla Aleramo, Antonio Meluschi and Nella Nobili, former partisans and students.

From 1951 to 1955, she wrote an advice column for Noi donne on topics related to womanhood and motherhood aimed at leftist women. In 1952, she published Mondine, a collection of personal essays about the so-called female mondina workers and the struggle to improve their conditions.

Viganò died in Bologna on 23 April 1976. In 2018, the city of Bologna in collaboration with the Associazione Nazionale Partigiani d'Italia (ANPI, National Association of Italian Partisans) erected a plaque commemorating the longtime home of Viganò and her husband.

== Works ==
- Ginestra in fiore, 1913
- Piccola flamma, 1916
- Il lume spento, 1933
- L'Agnese va a morire, 1949
- Mondine, 1952
- Arriva la cicogna, 1954
- Donne della Resistenza, 1955
- Ho conosciuto Ciro, 1959
- Una storia di ragazze, 1962
- Matrimonio in brigata, 1976; English translation published 1999
- Rosario, 1984 (posthumous)
