= The Long Love Letter =

Japanese television series

The Long Love Letter (ロング・ラブレター〜漂流教室〜) is a 2002 Japanese television drama series based on the manga The Drifting Classroom by Kazuo Umezu.

== Plot ==
One day, Yuka Misaki, a daughter of a flower shop owner meets Akio Asami, a college student. They are both attracted to each other and exchange phone numbers, which are stored in their cellphones. After they part, Asami's bag (along with his cellphone) is stolen, and he can't recall Misaki's phone number, so he effectively has no way to contact her.

One year later, Yuka begins a job at her father's flower shop and Akio becomes a mathematics teacher at Motokura High School. One day in November, Yuka goes to the Motokura High School to collect money for the flowers and meets Akio again. However, they can't get along well. In January, Yuka gets a call from Ryuta Fujisawa and they promise to meet that afternoon. In the morning, Yuka goes to the school again to collect money that she couldn't collect before.

Akio finds Yuka in the playground and calls out to her. At that moment, a large earthquake occurs. By the time it stops, their school is surrounded by dry and sandy desert. Not only Yuka and Akio, but other students including Tadashi Otomo, Shou Takamatsu, Fumiya Ikegaki are in the school that day.

The students begin to panic, but Yuka and Akio try to calm them. At first, the students are pessimistic because there is not enough food and water. However, they begin to accept what happened to them. Many strange things happen in the desert. They see a total eclipse of the sun that should not have occurred in 2002. They see a train which should not exist in 2002. From those two things, they notice that they are in the future.

They start to think that they have to survive in that world and change the "future." Otherwise, there will be no "future." They begin to think about the reasons why they are transferred to the future. That is because they are chosen to change the future.

At the same time, they write a letter to them in the past. Everyone says that people have to live "now" at the best they can.

One day, an eruption occurs and the earth gets its natural sources back. In the past, they were spoiling the sources a lot without noticing. However, they learn the importance of the natural resources by now. They decide to save them and will not spoil them again.

Also, they use water to water flowers to raise the flowers and grasses. Several years later, the earth revive again and the school building is surrounded by grasses instead of deserts. They tried their best to live in the future and the future is changed.

== Cast ==
- Takako Tokiwa as Yuka Misaki
- Yōsuke Kubozuka as Akio Asami
- Tomohisa Yamashita as Tadashi Otomo
- Takayuki Yamada as Shou Takamatu
- Emi Suzuki as Midori Gamou
- Ren Osugi as Shigeo Misaki
- Satoshi Tsumabuki as Ryuta Fujisawa
- Hiromi Nakajima as Noriko Sekiya
- Kei Ishibashi as Jyunko Nakazawa
- Asami Mizukawa as Kaoru Ichinose
- Asahi Uchida as Shinichi Yamada
- Kana Fujii as Mizuho Nippa
