= Nella Nobili =

Italian poet and writer

- Born: 1926; Bologna, Italy
- Died: 1985 (aged 58–59); Cachan, France
- Occupations: Poet; writer
- Writing career
- Language: French; Italian
- Genres: Proletarian; Lesbian
- Subject: Factory work

Nella Nobili (1926–1985) was an Italian poet and writer. She is considered a representative of proletarian literature. She wrote in French and Italian, notably about factory work and lesbian love.

== Biography ==
Nella Nobili was born in 1926 in Bologna. Coming from a modest background, she left school at the age of twelve to work in a factory, first in a ceramics workshop, then at fourteen as a glassblower. It was as a self-taught person that she began to develop a link with writing and poetry. During breaks after work, she wrote her first texts and avidly read everything she could find: Italian poetry, but also Rainer Maria Rilke and Emily Dickinson. She met Giorgio Morandi, to whom she dedicated the poem Landscape in 1926.

After World War II, she came into contact with the artistic and literary circles of Bologna in the immediate post-war period. She met the painter Aldo Borgonzoni (1913–2004): she assiduously frequented his studio in via Saragozza. She met the director of "Giornale della Sera" Giuseppe Galasso.

She frequented the house of Renata Viganò and Antonio Meluschi in Via Mascarella, where intellectuals such as Pier Paolo Pasolini and Sibilla Aleramo, former partisans and students met.

At the Caffé Zanarini in Piazza Galvani, then a meeting place for left-wing activists, she met Enrico Berlinguer, the future secretary of the Communist Party.

In 1949, she moved to Rome. There she met anti-fascist groups, artists and writers, and she began to gain recognition and support, notably from Elsa Morante and Michel Ragon.

Working in a workshop in her youth, as a nurse's aide during the war and later as the head of a cufflink company, Nella Nobili published poems related to the world of the factory (La jeune fille à l'usine, 1978), which earned her recognition as a representative of proletarian literature. But in Rome, she felt that she was being “paraded around like a little monster dressed as a worker-poet” and, disenchanted, she left for France.

Nobili arrived in Paris in 1953, where she remained for the rest of her life. There she made handicrafts with miniature works of art using the self-invented cold-casting method.

She began writing in French in the 1960s. She published collections of poems and books, including Les femmes et l'amour homosexuel, with her co-author, Édith Zha, in 1979, which brought together testimonies, reflections and documentation on female homosexual love. She published in magazines such as Sorcières and corresponded with figures such as Giorgio Morandi, Michel Ragon, Bernard Noël, Claire Etcherelli and Henri Thomas. In 1975, Simone de Beauvoir, one of her detractors, judged her writing to be clumsy, inexperienced and improvised, and this judgement was very painful for Nobili.

She committed suicide at the age of 59, in 1985, in Cachan.

She left a legacy of poems to be read, for they are a denunciation, a beacon of light on the condition of women and workers in the 1940s, a cry against stigmatising society, factories that are prisons and prejudices about love.

— Marie Potel

== Works ==
- I quaderni della fabbrica (The factory's notebooks), 1948.
- Nobili, Nella (1949). Poesie: 1946-1948 (in Italian). Tosi e Danzi.
- Nobili, Nella (1978). La jeune fille à l'usine (in French). Paris: Éditions Caractères.
- Nobili, Nella; Zha, Édith (1979). Les femmes et l'amour homosexuel (in French). Hachette littérature. ISBN 978-2-01-006204-9.
- Nobili, Nella (1980). Douze poèmes de deuil (in French). N. Stern.
- Nobili, Nella (1981). "Les immaternelles". Sorcières: Les femmes vivent. 23 (1): 45–47.
- Nobili, Nella (22 June 2018). Ho camminato nel mondo con l'anima aperta (in Italian). RCS MEDIAGROUP (Solferino Libri). ISBN 978-88-282-0083-3.

== Legacy ==
Her works have been partly translated by Marie-José Tramuta, professor at the University of Caen Normandy. His archives are kept by the Institut mémoires de l'édition contemporaine.

In September 2018, her compositions were read and performed by Drusilla Foer as part of Il Tempo delle Donne, the event organised by Corriere della Sera at the Milan Triennale.
