= Makoto-chan =

Manga series by Kazuo Umezu

- Volume 12 of Makoto-chan

まことちゃん
- Manga
- Written by: Kazuo Umezu
- Published by: Shogakukan
- Imprint: Shōnen Sunday Comics
- Magazine: Weekly Shōnen Sunday
- Original run: April 18, 1976 – July 8, 1981
- Volumes: 24
- Manga

Heisei-ban Makoto-chan
- Written by: Kazuo Umezu
- Published by: Shogakukan
- Magazine: Weekly Shōnen Sunday
- Original run: August 24, 1988 – July 26, 1989
- Volumes: 4
- Anime film
- Directed by: Tsutomu Shibayama
- Studio: Tokyo Movie Shinsha
- Released: July 26, 1980
- Runtime: 85 minutes

Makoto-chan (まことちゃん) is a shōnen gag manga by Kazuo Umezu. The series was initially published in Weekly Shōnen Sunday from April 18, 1976, to July 8, 1981, and later returned from August 24, 1988, to July 26, 1989, as Heisei-ban Makoto-chan (平成版; "Heisei-edition Makoto-chan").

== Plot ==
The series follows the odd life of kindergartener Makoto Sawada and his family. Makoto gets into all sorts of toilet and adult humor. He sometimes dresses in his mother's and sister's clothing, and often has a long strand of mucus dangling from his nose.

== Film ==
An animated film adaptation of the manga directed by Tsutomu Shibayama titled Makoto-chan was released in Japan on July 26, 1980, where it was distributed by Toho.
