= Kazuo Umezu's Horror Theater =

Japanese anthology horror film series

- Promotional release poster
- Created by: Kazuo Umezu
- Years: 2005

Films and television
- Film(s): House of Bugs (or Bug's House); Ambrosia (or Diet); Snake Girl (or The Harlequin Girl); The Wish; Present; Death Make

Kazuo Umezu's Horror Theater (Japanese: 楳図かずお恐怖劇場, Hepburn: Umezu Kazuo: Kyōfu gekijō), also known as Kazuo Umezz's Horror Theater, is a Japanese six-part anthology horror film series based on manga works by Kazuo Umezu. It was released in 2005 to coincide with the 50th anniversary of the start of Umezu's career as a manga artist. The series was distributed by Shochiku, and features music composed by singer-songwriter Rurutia.

== Films ==
=== House of Bugs ===
Kazuo Umezu's Horror Theater: House of Bugs (楳図かずお恐怖劇場蟲たちの家, Umezu Kazuo: Kyōfu gekijō - Mushi-tachi no ie; a.k.a. Bug's House) is directed by Kiyoshi Kurosawa. Its plot centers around a husband and wife, the former of whom suspects the latter of not only being unfaithful to him, but possibly mutating into a large insect.

=== Ambrosia ===
Kazuo Umezu's Horror Theater: Ambrosia (楳図かずお恐怖劇場絶食, Umezu Kazuo: Kyōfu gekijō - Zesshoku; a.k.a. Diet), is directed by Itō Tadafumi and written by Hiroshi Takahashi. It follows a schoolgirl who goes on an extreme diet in order to win the affections of a boy.

=== Snake Girl ===
Kazuo Umezu's Horror Theater: Snake Girl (楳図かずお恐怖劇場まだらの少女, Umezu Kazuo: Kyōfu gekijō - Madara no shōjo; a.k.a. The Harlequin Girl), directed by Noboru Iguchi, is an adaptation of The Spotted Girl, an installment in Umezu's 1965–66 manga trilogy Reptilia. The film stars Arisa Nakamura as Yumiko, a girl who is invited by her cousin to spend her summer vacation in a rural village, where she finds herself terrorized by a half-human, half-snake witch.

=== The Wish ===
Kazuo Umezu's Horror Theater: The Wish (楳図かずお恐怖劇場, Umezu Kazuo: Kyōfu gekijō - Negai) is directed by Atsushi Shimizu. It follows a lonely schoolboy who carves a companion for himself in the form of a wooden doll shaped like a human head.

=== Present ===
Kazuo Umezu's Horror Theater: Present (楳図かずお恐怖劇場プレゼント, Umezu Kazuo: Kyōfu gekijō - Purezento), directed by Yūdai Yamaguchi, sees a group of students' Christmas festivities interrupted by a murderous Santa Claus and his band of flesh-eating reindeer.

=== Death Make ===
Kazuo Umezu's Horror Theater: Death Make (楳図かずおの恐怖劇場 デスメイク, Umezu Kazuo: Kyōfu gekijō - Death Make) is directed by Taichi Itō. It follows a group of supposed psychics who, as part of a reality television program, are challenged to spend 24 hours in an abandoned office building where, ten years prior, a group of girls disappeared after attempting to summon ghosts.

== Release ==
The six films were screened at the Eurospace theater in Shibuya, Tokyo, Japan, on 18 June 2005.
