= Thierry Jonquet =

French writer (1954–2009)

Thierry Jonquet (French: [tjɛʁi ʒɔ̃kɛ]; 19 January 1954 – 9 August 2009) was a French writer who specialised in crime novels with political themes. He was born in Paris; his most recent and best known novel outside France was Mygale (1984), then published in the US in 2003 by City Lights. Mygale was also published in the UK as Tarantula in 2005 (Serpent's Tail). He wrote over 20 novels in French, including Le bal des débris, Moloch and Rouge c'est la vie.

Jonquet died aged 55 in hospital in Paris.

Tarantula was filmed by Spanish director Pedro Almodóvar, under the title The Skin I Live In, which was entered in competition in May 2011 for the Cannes Film Festival.

== Bibliography ==
- Mémoire en cage (1982)
- Ils sont votre épouvante et vous êtes leur crainte (2006)
- Mon vieux (2005)
- Comedia (2005)
- Jours tranquilles à Belleville (2003)
- Le manoir des immortelles (2003)
- Ad vitam aeternam (2002)
- Le bal des débris (2000)
- Rouge c'est la vie (1998)
- Les orpailleurs (1993)
- La Bête et la Belle (1985)
- Mygale (1984, revised in 1995); in English translation by Donald Nicholson-Smith as Mygale (City Lights, 2003) and as Tarantula (Serpent's Tail, 2005)
