= Donald Nicholson-Smith =

Translator and freelance editor

Donald Nicholson-Smith (born 1943 in Manchester, England) is a British translator and freelance editor, interested in literature, art, psychoanalysis, social criticism, theory, history, crime fiction, and cinema.

He was an early translator of Situationist material into English. He joined the English section of the Situationist International in 1965 and was expelled in December 1967.

He translated Jean Laplanche and J.-B. Pontalis’s concordance to Freud, Vocabulaire de la psychanalyse in the 1970s as The Language of Psychoanalysis (London and New York, 1973). Around that time, he made psychology and psychoanalysis one of his specialities (for example Henri Wallon, Piaget, Derrida's work on psychoanalysis). He also translated many texts of the Situationist International, including Guy Debord’s The Society of the Spectacle (New York, 1994) and Raoul Vaneigem’s The Revolution of Everyday Life (2003; third, revised edition, Oakland, 2012). He also translated Henri Lefebvre’s The Production of Space (Oxford, 1991).

Donald Nicholson-Smith lives in New York City.

== Translations ==
- Nicole Claveloux, The Green Hand and Other Stories, New York Review Books (2017)
- Abdellatif Laabi, In Praise of Defeat, Archipelago Books, 2016. (shortlisted for the 2017 Griffin Poetry Prize)
- Gianfranco Sanguinetti, Money, sex and power: on a sham biography of Guy Debord, cipM, 2016.
- Jean-Paul Clébert, Paris Vagabond, New York Review Books, 2016.
- Jean-Patrick Manchette, The Mad and the Bad, New York Review Books, 2014.
- _____. Fatale, New York Review Books, 2011.
- Guy Debord and Alice Becker-Ho, A Game of War, Atlas Press, 2007.
- Antonin Artaud. 50 Drawings to Murder Magic, Seagull Books, 2008.
- Guy Debord. The Society of the Spectacle, Zone, 1994.
- _____. A Sick Planet, Seagull Books, 2008.
- Anselm Jappe. Guy Debord, University of California Press, 1999.
- Thierry Jonquet. Mygale, City Lights, 2003.
- _____. Tarantula, Serpent's Tail, 2005.
- Laplanche & Pontalis. The Language of Psychoanalysis, Norton, 1974.
- Henri Lefebvre. The Production of Space, Blackwell, 1991.
- Jean-Patrick Manchette. Three to Kill, City Lights, 2002.
- Paco Ignacio Taibo II. 68, Seven Stories, 2004.
- Raoul Vaneigem. The Revolution of Everyday Life, Rebel Press, 2003.
- _____. A Cavalier History of Surrealism, AK Press, 1999.

== Articles ==
- T. J. Clark and Donald Nicholson-Smith (Winter 1997). "Why Art Can't Kill the Situationist International". October. Also published at pp. 467–488 of book Tom McDonough (2004) (Editor) Guy Debord and the Situationist International: Texts and Documents. The MIT Press (April 1, 2004) 514 pages ISBN 0-262-63300-0 ISBN 978-0262633000
- (2004) Black glove/white glove: revisiting Mexico's 1968
