= Pinky (magazine) =

Defunct Japanese fashion magazine

- Emi Suzuki
- Categories: Fashion
- Frequency: Monthly
- Circulation: 736,669 (2009)
- Publisher: Shueisha
- Founded: 2004
- Final issue: 22 December 2009
- Company: Shueisha
- Country: Japan
- Based in: Tokyo
- Language: Japanese
- Website: Official website(archived)

Pinky was a Japanese fashion magazine published by Shueisha. Launched in 2004 as a sister magazine of Seventeen, Pinky was targeted at teenagers and young women in their early 20s or early 30s. The headquarters of the magazine was in Tokyo. The indie rock band 0.8Syooogeki were signed to a contract with the magazine in 2008. Pinky officially ended publishing on 22 December 2009.

== Special exclusive models ==
- Emi Suzuki
- Nozomi Sasaki

== Exclusive models ==
Aimi
Mai Goto
Nami Inoue
Kelly
Coco Kinoshita
Yukina Kinoshita
Hitomi Nakahodo
Risa Nakama
Sayaka Ogata
Sachi
Hitomi Sakata
Shiori Sato
Mai Suzuri
Izumi Tokuda
Yumi Yamaoka
Mari Yaguchi
