= The Snake Girl and the Silver-Haired Witch =

- Theatrical release poster
- Directed by: Noriaki Yuasa
- Screenplay by: Kimiyuki Hasegawa
- Based on: Hebimusune to Hakuhatsuki by Kazuo Umezu
- Produced by: Kazumasa Nakano
- Starring: Yachie Matsui; Mayumi Takahashi; Yoshiro Kiahara
- Cinematography: Akira Uehara
- Edited by: Yoshiyuki Miyazaki
- Production company: Daiei Film
- Distributed by: Daiei
- Release date: 14 December 1968 (Japan)
- Running time: 82 minutes
- Country: Japan
- Language: Japanese

The Snake Girl and the Silver-Haired Witch (蛇娘と白髪魔, Hebimusume to Hakuhatsuma) is a 1968 Japanese horror film directed by Noriaki Yuasa. It was created based off of several horror short stories published in Shojo Friend by Kazuo Umezz 1956-1958, two of which were later released in the book Reptilia in English in 2007. The film is about a young girl named Sayuri who is reunited with her estranged family after years in an orphanage, but discovers that her homelife involves an amnesiac mother, her sister is confined to the attic, and begins to wonder if this is related to her father's experiments with poisonous snakes.

== Cast ==
- Kuniko Miyake as Sister Yamakawa
- Yuko Hamada as Yuko Nanjo
- Sachiko Meguro as Shige Kito
- Yachie Matsui as Sayuri Nanjo
- Yoshiro Kitahara as Goro Nanjo
- Tadashi Date as Ambassador
- Mariko Fukuhara as Doll
- Mayumi Takahashi as Tamami Nanjo
- Osamu Maruyama as Doctor
- Kazuo Umezu as Taxi driver

== Release ==
The Snake Girl and the Silver-Haired Witch was released in Japan on December 14, 1968, along with Yokai Monsters: Spook Warfare of the Yokai Monsters franchise. It was released in the United States by Daiei International Films with English subtitles in 1969. The film was released on Blu-ray by Arrow Video in September 2021. This was its blu-ray debut and the first time it was released on home video outside of Japan.

== Reception ==
From retrospective reviews, Andrew Crump of Fangoria found that the film on paper seemed like "Japanese genre cinema at its wackiest" but was more like a Scooby-Doo mystery and was "shockingly middle of the road verging on tame" and concluded that the film was "a movie of bungled opportunity with plenty to say about the era it was made."
