= Emi Suzuki =

Japanese model and actress (born 1985)

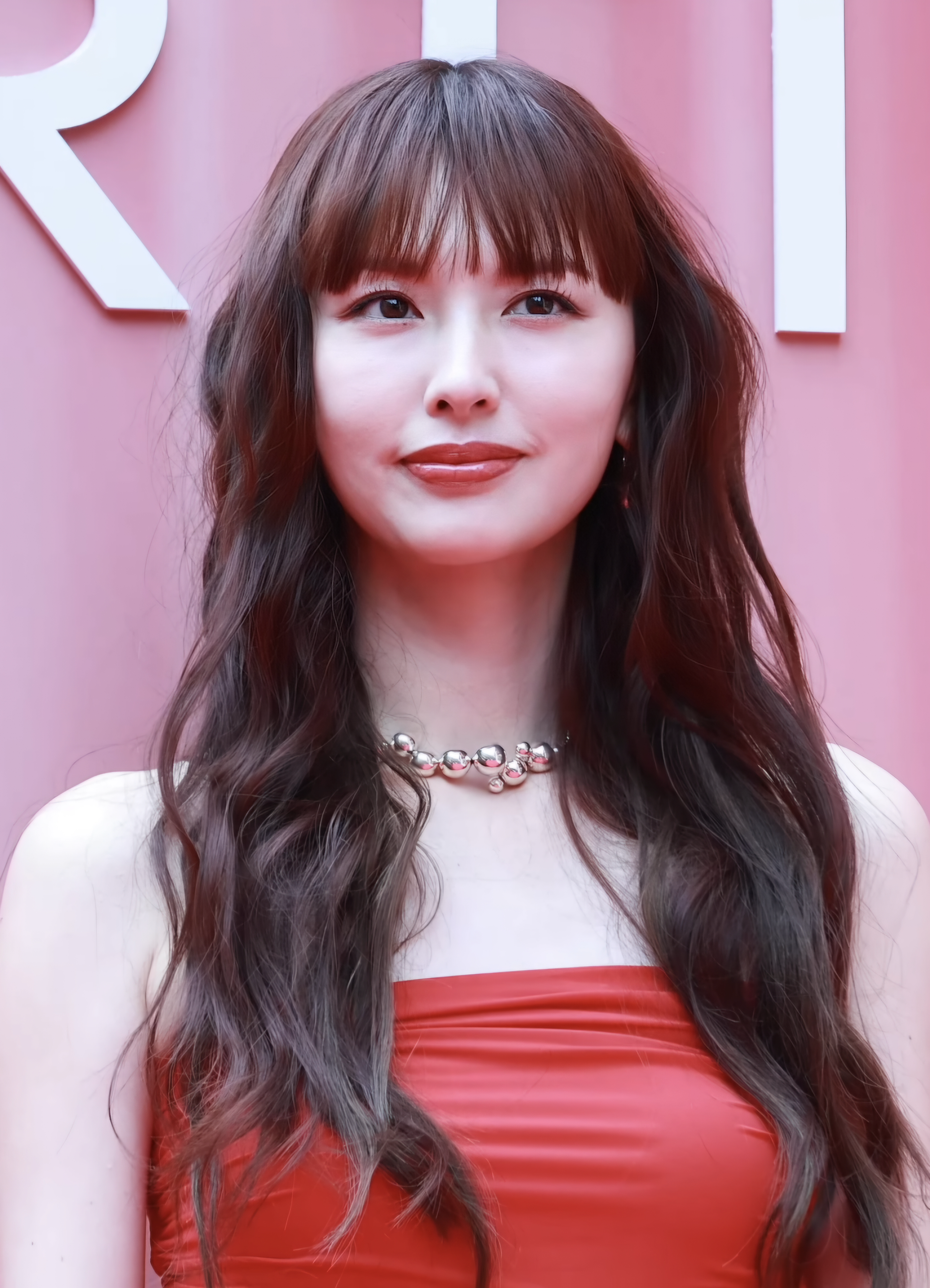
- Suzuki in 2025
- Born: Wú Zǐ Liàng (吴子靚); September 13, 1985 (age 41); Shanghai, China
- Other names: Emichee; Emmy
- Citizenship: Japan
- Occupations: Model; actress
- Years active: 1999–present
- Hometown: Kyoto, Japan
- Agent: Stardust Promotion
- Spouse: Unknown (m. 2013)
- Children: 1
- Modeling information
- Height: 168 cm (5 ft 6 in)
- Hair color: black
- Eye color: brown

Japanese name
- Kanji: 鈴木 えみ
- Hiragana: すずき えみ
Transcriptions
- Romanization: Suzuki Emi

Emi Suzuki (鈴木 えみ, Suzuki Emi; born September 13, 1985), also called Emichee (えみちぃ), is a Japanese model and retired occasional actress. She debuted in 2005 with Seventeen and has continued to work in the Japanese fashion and modeling industry.

== Early life ==
An only child, Suzuki was born on September 13, 1985, in Shanghai, China. Her birth name was Wu Ziliang (吴子靚). At the age of 12, she emigrated to Kyoto and became a naturalized Japanese citizen. She changed her name to Emi Suzuki (鈴木依美) in preparation for her entrance into a public junior high school in Kyoto. When she was 13, she began fashion modeling and professionally the following year. She enrolled at Kyoto Ryoyo High School, but did not graduate.

== Career ==
Suzuki began modeling after it was suggested to her by a classmate. She debuted with Seventeen in 1999 and in the same year she appeared in her first TV commercial for Dancemania Speed 2 alongside Franky Gee. Shortly thereafter, her popularity rose when she made appearances at ready-to-wear open collections for several clothing lines.

=== 2002–2007 ===
In 2002, Suzuki began appearing in designer brands' private collections maintaining strict requirements regarding the body fat percentage (BFP) standard. She was also cast in the music video for Ketsumeishi's 2005 mega-hit song Sakura.

Suzuki had decided to retire from modeling and settled back to Kyoto, but her agency and the publisher Shueisha co-started a new magazine, Pinky; she terminated her contract with Seventeen in 2006. Suzuki became a frequent model with Pinky. To date, all of Suzuki's covers with the magazine have been with her solely, except for one notable exception in a November 2007 issue. Suzuki was featured on the first issue of the magazine.

While working as a model for Pinky and in the non-commercial (professional) scene, she was hired for many other fashion magazines and has modeled for a variety of ads, such as Shiseido, Suntory, Meiji, OPC (for Calorie Mate). Aside from appearing in magazines, ads, and countless private collections, Suzuki has been cast in several TV series, such as The Long Love Letter, The Queen of Lunchtime Cuisine, Water Boys 2, and Yukan Club. Her role in Yukan Club was as a girl named "Karen". Her portrayal of the character Karen in Yukan Club received notable attention.

From January to November 2007, Suzuki earned $29 million. She was reported by multiple media sources to be among the highest-paid Japanese models in 2007.

=== 2010–present ===
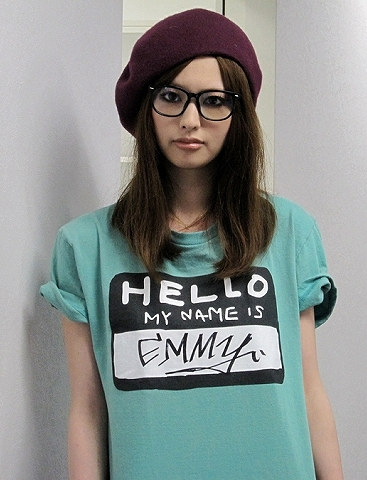
Emi Suzuki in 2009

In January 2010, she made a surprise appearance as an alumnus on Fuji Mezamashi TV's "Today's Countdown", a news program which she appeared on in her novice years (2001–2002). Despite having a busy work schedule, she referred to herself as a semi-retired model, and implied that she did not wish to pursue an acting career.

Suzuki has appeared on the first issue of Used Mix Special Edition CLOSET, as one of its three featured models along with Miho Tanaka and Rena Takeshita near the end of 2010.

== Weight controversy ==
In November 2008, a special editorial "The Starving Princess Part 8: Can't Stop, Won't Stop" was published in Takarajima, a monthly lifestyle magazine. Suzuki was named "The 6th thinnest female model in the 2000s". This editorial further reported her body specifications, which was calculated by several specialists as 5 ft 9 1/2 in (176.5 cm), 93 pounds (42 kg), and 13.4 (BMI). According to former models who worked with Suzuki at Seventeen (including Anna Tsuchiya, Naoko Tokuzawa, and Ayano Seki), Suzuki had a large appetite. She is noted for her extremely fast metabolism.

== Personal life ==
Suzuki married a non-celebrity man who works in the fashion industry in February 2013, after the two had dated for three months. She also revealed that he had initially proposed to her within just two weeks of dating. She gave birth to their only daughter on October 7, 2013.

She became best friends with Nana Eikura in 2003.

== Filmography ==
=== Film ===
Year	Title	Role	Notes	Ref(s)
2006	Bird Call	Sonoka Ishii	Short film; lead role	
2025	True Beauty	Selena		

=== Television ===
Year	Title	Role	Notes	Ref(s)
2001	Rebel Voyage	Ayumi Satsukawa		
2002	The Long Love Letter	Midori Gamou		
2002	The Queen of Lunchtime Cuisine	Yumi	Season 1	
2004	Water Boys 2	Kozue Kitagawa		
2005	The Way of Osaka Financing	Komiya Sae	Episode 6	
2006	Gal Circle	Remi		
2006	The Life of Hated Matsuko	Asuka Kawajiri		
2007	Yūkan Club	Karen Kizakura		
2008	My Sassy Girl	Haruka Kisaragi		
