= 0.8Syooogeki =

Japanese band

- Origin: Japan
- Genres: New wave, post-punk, folk
- Years active: 2008–2017
- Label: Actwise (2009—2017)
- Past members: Tadaomi Tōyama; J.M.
- Website: syooogeki.com

0.8Syooogeki (0.8秒と衝撃。, Reitenhachi-byō to Shōgeki.; "0.8 Seconds and a Crash.") were a two-member Japanese independent band, who debuted in 2009 with the single "Postman John".

== Biography ==
The band was formed in 2008, with the members J.M. and Tadaomi Tōyama. J.M. was signed to an exclusive contract with Pinky fashion magazine, however the magazine disbanded in late 2009. Tōyama also works as a radio personality on Tokyo FM. Tadaomi Tōyama writes and produces the majority of the band's songs, with J.M. occasionally adding additional arrangement. Both members feature as vocalists, and Tōyama also performs guitar in the band.

Throughout 2008, the band entered music competitions, and applied to record company auditions. The band began performing lives in late August 2010, and released their debut single "Postman John" in September. The band's debut album, Zoo & Lennon was released a month later in October 2010, under independent label Evol Records' sub-label, Actwise.

The band released an extended play, Ethnofunky Dostoyevsky Comecome Club EP, in August 2010, and at the same time Tōyama began writing a column for alternative magazine Skream!. The band's Ichi-bō Ni-bō San-bō Yon-bō Go-bō Roku-bō, Tōyō no Techno. was released in May 2011, preceded by the single "Machizō, Machiko, Hakai" in March 2011. These two releases were the first to chart on Oricon's singles and albums chart, reaching numbers 72 and 80 respectively.

In 2017, they announced that they were to end their activities together after a series of live shows.

== Discography ==
=== Albums ===
Year	Album Information	Oricon Albums Charts	Reported sales
2009	Zoo & Lennon: Label: Actwise (EVOL-1005); Released: October 7, 2009; Formats: CD, digital download	—	—
2011	Blast 1 Blast 2 Blast 3 Blast 4 Blast 5 Blast 6, Far East Techno. (1暴2暴3暴4暴5暴6暴、東洋のテクノ。, Ichi-bō Ni-bō San-bō Yon-bō Go-bō Roku-bō, Tōyō no Techno.): Label: Actwise (EVOL-1015); Released: May 18, 2011; Formats: CD, digital download	72	1,500
2013	[Patron Deity of Electric Music] (【電子音楽の守護神】, [Denshi Ongaku no Shugoshin]): Label: Actwise (EVOL-1030); Released: February 6, 2013; Formats: CD, digital download	49	3,200
2013	NEW GERMAN WAVE4: Label: Actwise (EVOL-1033); Released: November 6, 2013; Formats: CD, digital download		
2015	Destruction Pop (破壊POP, Hakai Pop): Released: August 8, 2015; Formats: CD, digital download; Label: Hagata (HAGT-003)		

=== Extended plays ===
Year	Album Information	Oricon Albums Charts	Reported sales
2010	Ethnofunky Dostoyevsky Comecome Club EP (エスノファンキードストエフスキーカムカムクラブEP, Esunofankī Dosuroefusukī Kamukamu Kurabu Ī Pī): Label: Actwise (EVOL-1010); Released: August 4, 2010; Formats: CD, digital download	—	—
2012	Vertical JM Yayayard EP (バーティカルJ.M.ヤーヤーヤードEP, Bātikaru Jei Em Yāyāyādo Ī Pī): Label: Actwise (EVOL-1020); Released: June 6, 2012; Formats: CD, digital download	28	2,800
2014	Inari Sushi Girl's Tears,,, EP (いなり寿司ガールの涙、、、EP, Inarizushi gāru no namida,,, Ī Pī): Released: September 10, 2014; Formats: CD, digital download; Label: Hagata (HAGT-001)		
2015	Jasmine Lover (ジャスミンの恋人, Jasumin no koibito): Released: March 18, 2015; Formats: CD, digital download; Label: Hagata (HAGT-002)		
2017	Tara, Tu, Sutra (つぁら、とぅ、すとら, Tsuara, tou, su tora): Released: March 15, 2017; Formats: CD; Label: Hagata (HAGT-004)		

=== Singles ===
Release	Title	Notes	Chart positions		Oricon sales	Album
Release	Title	Notes	Oricon Singles Charts	Billboard Japan Hot 100	Oricon sales	Album
2009	"Postman John"	Released exclusively at Tower Records, Disk Union and indiesmusic.com	—	—	—	Zoo & Lennon
2011	"Machizō, Machiko, Hakai" (「町蔵・町子・破壊」; "Town Storage, Town Kid, Destruction")	Limited 2,000 copy production run	80	—	1,200	Ichi-bō Ni-bō San-bō Yon-bō Go-bō Roku-bō, Tōyō no Techno.
