= Rena Takeshita =

Japanese fashion model and actress

- Born: December 17, 1981 (age 44); Amami Ōshima, Kagoshima, Japan
- Years active: 1997–present
- Spouse: Unknown (m. 2012)
- Children: 1
- Modeling information
- Height: 1.70 m (5 ft 7 in)

Rena Takeshita (竹下 玲奈, Takeshita Rena; born December 17, 1981 in Amami Ōshima) is a Japanese fashion model and occasional actress. Since the late 1990s she has appeared in numerous magazines, catalogs, television commercials, TV shows and films.

== Biography ==
Born in the main island of Amami, she began her professional fashion modeling career at the age of around 14 and began commercial fashion modeling at the age of around 15. She made her first television appearance in 1998 when she appeared on a TV ad for House Wellness Foods' soft drink Plussy. She made her TV show debut in October 2000 on TBS's midnight show Wonderful.

She has regularly appeared on numerous fashion magazines notably More, Style, Sweet, Oggi, Ar, Ginger, CanCam and Non-no, and numerous television and print ads including ones for Kobayashi Pharmaceutical Co.'s Sarasaty Cotton, Kao's Sifone (in Hong Kong and Taiwan) and Biore and Prettia, Mitsui Fudosan's Mitsui Outlet Park, Nissan's Moco and Kirin's Premium Cocktail.

She made her acting debut in the 2004 film Gira directed by Noriyuki Taniguchi. Since then she has appeared in two films, one being the 2007 Japan Academy Prize-winning film Tokyo Tower, and the other being the 2008 film Experiment No. 4: It’s a small world directed by Nobuhiro Yamashita.

She left her long-term agency Hirata Office in March 2009, signing with the Dress Code agency.

In 2010 she released her first solo photobook, Karte, consisted of her photographs taken over 6 years by photographer Chikashi Kasai.

Near the end of 2010, Takeshita appeared on the first issue of the Closet magazine as one of its three best featured models along with Miho Tanaka and Emi Suzuki.

In May 2012, she married with a general man who is two years younger. Her husband works in the food and beverage industry in Fukuoka, and they got married after a long-distance relationship. In December, she gave birth to her first daughter, named Mahana (真花).
