= Mother (2014 film) =

2014 Japanese autobiographical film

- Theatrical poster
- Directed by: Kazuo Umezu
- Screenplay by: Kazuo Umezu
- Starring: Kataoka Ainosuke VI; Kimie Shingyōji
- Release date: September 27, 2014 (Japan)
- Running time: 83 minutes
- Country: Japan
- Language: Japanese

Mother (マザー) is a 2014 Japanese autobiographical film directed by Kazuo Umezu. Kataoka Ainosuke VI plays the role of Umezu.

== Cast ==
- Kataoka Ainosuke VI as Kazuo Umezu
- Kimie Shingyōji as Ichie
