= The Skin I Live In =

2011 film directed by Pedro Almodóvar

- Theatrical release poster
- Spanish: La piel que habito
- Directed by: Pedro Almodóvar
- Screenplay by: Pedro Almodóvar; Agustín Almodóvar (Note: Collaboration)
- Based on: Tarantula by Thierry Jonquet
- Produced by: Agustín Almodóvar; Esther García
- Starring: Antonio Banderas; Elena Anaya; Marisa Paredes; Jan Cornet; Roberto Álamo
- Cinematography: José Luis Alcaine
- Edited by: José Salcedo
- Music by: Alberto Iglesias
- Production companies: El Deseo; Blue Haze Entertainment; FilmNation Entertainment
- Distributed by: Warner Bros. Entertainment España
- Release dates: 19 May 2011 (Cannes); 2 September 2011 (Spain)
- Running time: 120 minutes
- Country: Spain
- Language: Spanish
- Budget: $13.5 million
- Box office: $33.7 million

The Skin I Live In (Spanish: La piel que habito) is a 2011 Spanish psychological thriller film written and directed by Pedro Almodóvar, starring Antonio Banderas, Elena Anaya, Marisa Paredes, Jan Cornet and Roberto Álamo. It is based on Thierry Jonquet's 1984 novel Mygale, first published in French and then in English under the title Tarantula.

Almodóvar has described the film as "a horror story without screams or frights". The film was the first collaboration in 21 years between Almodóvar and Banderas since Tie Me Up! Tie Me Down! (1990). It premiered in competition at the 2011 Cannes Film Festival, and won Best Film Not in the English Language at the 65th BAFTA Awards. It was also nominated for the Golden Globe Award for Best Foreign Language Film and 16 Goya Awards.

== Plot ==
Plastic surgeon Robert Ledgard successfully cultivates an artificial skin resistant to burns and insect bites. Calling it "Gal", he claims to be testing it on athymic mice. Presenting at a medical symposium, Ledgard privately discloses that he has conducted illegal transgenic experiments on humans. He is forbidden to continue with his research.

On his secluded estate, Ledgard holds captive a young woman named Vera with the help of his servant, Marilia. There he continues his illegal experiments.

While Ledgard is out, Marilia's estranged son, Zeca, arrives after having committed a robbery. He asks Marilia to hide him for a few days. Seeing Vera on Ledgard's security camera screens, Zeca mistakes her for Ledgard's deceased wife, Gal, and demands to see her in person. When Marilia refuses, Zeca binds and gags Marilia and then rapes Vera. Ledgard arrives and kills Zeca.

While Ledgard disposes of Zeca's corpse, Marilia reveals to Vera that both Zeca and Ledgard are half-brothers and her sons, unknown to them. Ledgard was adopted by Marilia's employers, though raised by Marilia, and later went to medical school and married a woman named Gal. Raised without privilege as Marilia’s son, Zeca eventually left to live in the streets and smuggle drugs. When Zeca returned years later, Gal fell in love with him. Zeca and Gal decided to run off together but were involved in a car crash in which Gal was badly burnt. Assuming Gal to be dead, Zeca left the scene of the accident. Ledgard took Gal home, keeping her in total darkness, without any mirror, to hide her burn scars. One day, while hearing her daughter Norma singing in the garden, Gal saw her own reflection in the window. Traumatized by the sight, Gal jumped to her death in front of Norma.

After disposing of Zeca’s corpse, in the present, Ledgard returns and spends the night with an acquiescent Vera. Ledgard dreams of the night of a wedding six years earlier, when he found his daughter Norma unconscious on the ground, having been raped. Mentally unstable after witnessing her mother's suicide, under the effects of antipsychotic medication, a disoriented Norma saw Ledgard bending over her and mistakenly believed he raped her. Developing a fear of all men, Norma spent years in a mental health facility, eventually committing suicide as her mother had.

Simultaneously in the present, Vera, too, dreams of the same event. Vicente (whose identity is disclosed later) crashed the wedding and met Norma. In the garden, under the influence of drugs, Norma began to take off her clothes. Vicente kissed her, and they lay down on the ground engaging in sexual activity that confused and overwhelmed Norma. When ambient music changed to the song Norma was singing when she witnessed her mother's suicide, Norma started screaming. Vicente attempted to hush her screams, knocking her unconscious. Vicente fled the scene, unaware that Ledgard saw him leave on his motorbike.

Tracking down Vicente, Ledgard kidnapped him and held him captive, brutalizing him over a prolonged period, chained to a wall on bread and water, to wear down his resistance. As punishment for raping his daughter, Ledgard made Vicente a human guinea pig for his experiments. He presented a drugged Vicente on the operating table to his assistants as a sex change patient. Over a period of six years, Ledgard physically transformed Vicente into a replica of his late wife, using transgenesis and shaping Vicente’s physical appearance—molding a vagina, breasts, hips, buttocks, and feminine voice—and renaming him Vera. Defenseless, Vicente complied with the experimentation to stay alive, struggling to keep himself sane.

During the night, night in the present, Ledgard initiates sex, but Vera tells him that it is still painful after Zeca's rape. Allowed unusual access outside of normally locked quarters, ostensibly going to find lubricant, Vera retrieves Ledgard's gun and kills him. When Marilia barges into the bedroom, pistol in hand, Vera shoots and kills Marilia.

Freed from captivity, Vera/Vicente returns to his mother's dress shop. Tearfully, Vera/Vicente tells his lesbian ex-colleague Cristina, whom Vicente had loved six years prior, of the kidnapping, forced sex change, and the murders. As Vicente’s mother enters the room, Vera/Vicente quietly reveals to her: "I am Vicente."

== Cast ==
- Antonio Banderas as Dr. Robert Ledgard
- Elena Anaya as Vicente Guillén Piñeiro (voice) / Vera Cruz / Gal
- Marisa Paredes as Marilia
- Jan Cornet as Vicente Guillén Piñeiro / Vera Cruz (voice)
- Roberto Álamo as Zeca
- Blanca Suárez as Norma Ledgard
- Susi Sánchez as Vicente's mother
- Bárbara Lennie as Cristina
- Eduard Fernández as Fulgencio
- Concha Buika as wedding singer

== Production ==
Pedro Almodóvar read Thierry Jonquet's Tarantula approximately ten years before the film premiered. He described what attracted him in the novel as "the magnitude of Doctor Ledgard's vendetta". This became the core of the adaptation, which over time moved further and further from the original plot of the novel. Almodóvar was inspired by Georges Franju's Eyes Without a Face and the thriller films of Fritz Lang when he wrote the screenplay.

The director announced the project in 2002, when he envisioned Antonio Banderas and Penélope Cruz in the film's two leading roles, but eventually cast Banderas and Elena Anaya. The Skin I Live In was the first film Almodóvar and Banderas made together in 21 years, after having been regular collaborators in the 1980s. The film was produced through El Deseo for a budget of €10 million.

Principal photography began 23 August 2010 and ended almost four months later. Filming locations included Santiago de Compostela, Madrid, and a country house outside Toledo.

== Release ==
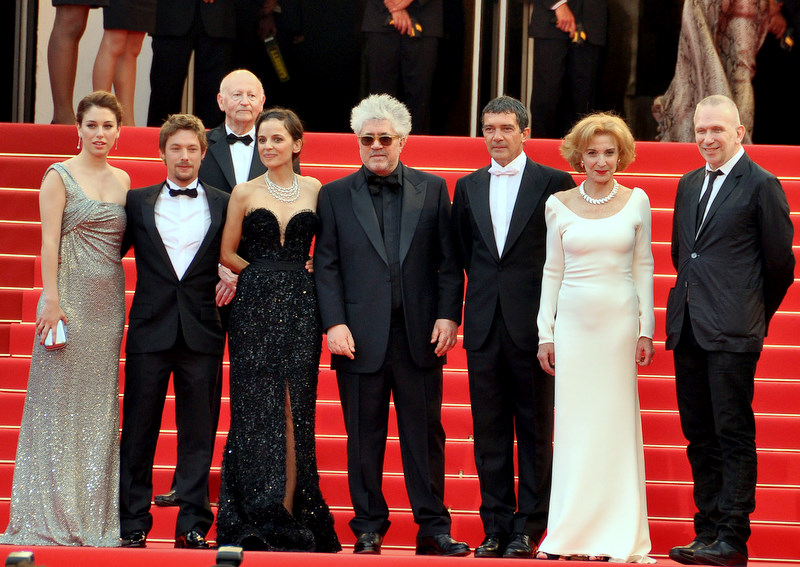
Cast and director at the Cannes Film Festival premiere; from left to right at forefront: Blanca Suárez, Jan Cornet, Elena Anaya, Almodóvar, Antonio Banderas, Marisa Paredes and Jean-Paul Gaultier.

The film premiered on 19 May 2011 in competition at the 2011 Cannes Film Festival. Due to developments in the industry of film distribution, El Deseo decided to abandon their previous release strategy for Almodóvar's works. The director's films had in the past usually been released in Spanish theatres in the spring and internationally during the last quarter of the year. The Skin I Live In was released worldwide in the autumn. The British release was 26 August 2011 through 20th Century Fox. In Spain it premiered on 2 September 2011. The film was released in the United States on 14 October the same year in a limited run through Sony Pictures Classics following its U.S. premiere at the 49th New York Film Festival on 12 October 2011.

== Reception ==
=== Critical response ===
On the review aggregator website Rotten Tomatoes, the film holds an 82% approval rating based on reviews from 179 critics, with an average rating of 7.5 out of 10. The site's summary reads "The Skin I Live In lacks Almodóvar's famously charged romance, replaced with a wonderfully bizarre and unpredictable detour into arthouse ick". Metacritic assigned the film a weighted average score of 70 out of 100, based on 37 critics, indicating "generally favorable reviews".

In May 2011, Kirk Honeycutt, writing for The Hollywood Reporter, said "Along with such usual Almodóvar obsessions as betrayal, anxiety, loneliness, sexual identity, and death, the Spanish director has added a science-fiction element that verges on horror. But like many lab experiments, this melodramatic hybrid makes for an unstable fusion. Only someone as talented as Almodóvar could have mixed such elements without blowing up an entire movie." Honeycutt continued: "The film's design, costumes and music, especially Alberto Iglesias' music, present a lushly beautiful setting, which is nonetheless a prison and house of horror. Almodóvar pumps his movie full of deadly earnestness and heady emotions." David Gritten notes Almodóvar "reaches out tentatively into unexplored genre territory—horror...Yet despite squirm-worthy moments ... the promise of horror gives way to Almodóvar's broader, familiar preoccupations: identity, blood ties, disguises and genetic traits." According to Gritten, "A list of the story's various elements— date rape, murder, secrets, lies, mystery parents, gender ambiguity, unbreakable emotional bonds—confirms The Skin I Live In as essentially a melodrama. Yet Almodóvar's story-telling is nowhere near as shrill as it once was: as a mature artist, he has refined his skills to a point where these soap-opera tropes assimilate smoothly into a complex whole....Typically for Almodóvar, it all looks ravishing, thanks to production designer Antxon Gómez and cinematographer José Luis Alcaine. All three men have the gift of investing mundane objects with a unique sheen; here even surgical instruments, about to be used malevolently, assume a dreamy, otherworldly quality. The Skin I Live In is the work of a master near the top of his game."

Upon its UK premiere, Peter Bradshaw gave it four of five stars, calling it "fantastically twisted" and "a truly macabre suspense thriller"—"Banderas is a wonderfully charismatic leading man; Almodóvar has found in him what Hitchcock found in Cary Grant. He is stylish, debonair, but with a chilling touch of determination and menace."

In an October 2011 New York Times Critics' Pick review, Manohla Dargis called the film "an existential mystery, a melodramatic thriller, a medical horror film or just a polymorphous extravaganza"; according to Dargis:

It takes time to get a handle on the story (and even then, your grip may not be secure), though it's instantly clear that something is jumping beneath the surface here, threatening to burst forth. Vera's plight and the temporal shifts help create an air of unease and barely controlled chaos, an unsettling vibe that becomes spooky when Ledgard puts on a white lab coat and begins doing strange things with blood....There are times in The Skin I Live In when it feels as if the whole thing will fly into pieces, as complication is piled onto complication, and new characters and intrigues are introduced amid horror, melodrama and slapstick.... [Yet] Mr. Almodóvar's control remains virtuosic and the film hangs together completely, secured by Vera and Ledgard and a relationship that's a Pandora's box from which identity, gender, sex and desire spring.

Dana Stevens noted it was Almodóvar's "first attempt to blend elements of the horror genre with the high-camp, gender-bending melodrama that's become his stock in trade"; she called it "visually lush and thematically ambitious", a film that "unfolds with a clinical chill we're unaccustomed to feeling in this director's films. The Skin I Live In is a math problem, not a poem. Still, what an elegant proof it is." Stevens called it a "meditation on profound themes: memory, grief, violence, degradation, and survival", a "multigenerational melodrama [that] slowly fuse[s] into a coherent (if wackily improbable) whole", offering "aesthetic and intellectual gratification, but little in the way of emotional punch." The New Yorker ranked the film at No. 25 on their list of "The 26 best films of 2011".

In 2024, filmmaker Quentin Tarantino named it one of the best films of the 21st century.

=== Accolades ===
Anaya received the Goya Award for Best Actress. The film won Best Film Not in the English Language at the 65th British Academy Film Awards; in previous years Almodóvar won that same award for his 1999 film All About My Mother and his 2002 film Talk to Her.

| Awards Group | Category | Recipient | Result |
|---|---|---|---|
| Actors and Actresses Union Awards | Best Film Actress in a Leading Role | Elena Anaya | Nominated |
| Actors and Actresses Union Awards | Best Film Actor in a Leading Role | Antonio Banderas | Nominated |
| Actors and Actresses Union Awards | Best Film Actress in a Minor Role | Marisa Paredes | Nominated |
| Actors and Actresses Union Awards | Best Film Actress in a Minor Role | Susi Sánchez | Nominated |
| Actors and Actresses Union Awards | Best New Actor | Jan Cornet | Won |
| Argentinean Film Critics Association Awards | Best Foreign Film | | Nominated |
| Australian Film Critics Association | Best Overseas Film (English Language) | | Nominated |
| BAFTA Awards | Best Film Not in the English Language | | Won |
| British Independent Film Awards | Best Foreign Film | | Nominated |
| Broadcast Film Critics Association Awards | Best Foreign Film | | Nominated |
| Cannes Film Festival | Palme d'Or | Pedro Almodóvar | Nominated |
| Chicago Film Critics Association Awards | Best Foreign Film | | Nominated |
| Cinema Writers Circle Awards | Best Actress | Elana Anaya | Nominated |
| Cinema Writers Circle Awards | Best Cinematography | | Nominated |
| Cinema Writers Circle Awards | Best Editing | | Nominated |
| Cinema Writers Circle Awards | Best Score | | Nominated |
| Cinema Writers Circle Awards | Best Screenplay | | Nominated |
| Dallas-Fort Worth Film Critics Association Awards | Best Foreign Film | | Won |
| European Film Awards | Best Composer | | Nominated |
| European Film Awards | Best Production | | Nominated |
| Fangoria Chainsaw Awards | Best Actor | Antonio Banderas | Won |
| Fangoria Chainsaw Awards | Best Foreign Film | | 3rd place |
| Fangoria Chainsaw Awards | Best Supporting Actress | Elena Anaya | 3rd place |
| Fangoria Chainsaw Awards | Best Screenplay | | Nominated |
| Florida Film Critics Circle Awards | Best Foreign Film | | Won |
| Fotogramas de Plata | Best Actress | Elena Anaya | Won |
| Fotogramas de Plata | Best Actor | Antonio Banderas | Nominated |
| Golden Globes | Best Foreign Film | | Nominated |
| Goya Awards | Best Actress | Elena Anaya | Won |
| Goya Awards | Best Make-Up | | Won |
| Goya Awards | Best New Actor | Jan Cornet | Won |
| Goya Awards | Best Score | | Won |
| Goya Awards | Best Actor | Antonio Banderas | Nominated |
| Goya Awards | Best Cinematography | | Nominated |
| Goya Awards | Best Costume Design | | Nominated |
| Goya Awards | Best Director | | Nominated |
| Goya Awards | Best Editing | | Nominated |
| Goya Awards | Best Film | | Nominated |
| Goya Awards | Best New Actress | Blanca Suárez | Nominated |
| Goya Awards | Best Production | | Nominated |
| Goya Awards | Best Production Supervision | | Nominated |
| Goya Awards | Best Screenplay | | Nominated |
| Goya Awards | Best Sound | | Nominated |
| Goya Awards | Best Effects | | Nominated |
| London Critics Circle Film Awards | Foreign Language Film of the Year | | Nominated |
| London Critics Circle Film Awards | Technical Achievement | | Nominated |
| Online Film Critics Society Awards | Best Foreign Film | | Nominated |
| Phoenix Film Critics Society Awards | Best Foreign Film | | Won |
| Sant Jordi Awards | Best Film | | Won |
| Sant Jordi Awards | Best Actress | Elena Ayana | 2nd Place |
| Saturn Award | Best International Film | | Won |
| Saturn Award | Best Actor | Antonio Banderas | Nominated |
| Saturn Award | Best Make-Up | | Nominated |
| Saturn Award | Best Supporting Actress | Elena Anaya | Nominated |
| Southeastern Film Critics Association Awards | Best Foreign Film | | 2nd Place |
| Spanish Actors Union | Best Male Newcomer | Jan Cornet | Won |
| Spanish Actors Union | Best Female Performance | Elena Ayana | Nominated |
| Spanish Actors Union | Best Male Performance | Antonio Banderas | Nominated |
| Spanish Actors Union | Best Female in Minor Performance | Marisa Paredes | Nominated |
| Spanish Actors Union | Best Female in Minor Performance | Susi Sánchez | Nominated |
| Washington DC Area Film Critics Association Awards | Best Foreign Film | | Won |
| World Soundtrack Awards 2012 | Best Composer of the Year | Alberto Iglesias | Won |
| New York Film Critics Circle Awards | Best Foreign Language Film | | Nominated |

== See also ==
- List of Spanish films of 2011
- Eyes Without a Face, a French classic of Horror cinema including comparable narrative elements

== Bibliography ==
- Benzal, Felix Monguilot (September 2015). "The Skin I Live In: Sexual Identity and Captivity in a Film by Pedro Almodóvar". Offscreen. 19 (9). ISSN 1712-9559.
