= Reptilia (manga) =

Manga series by Kazuo Umezu

- Cover to Scared of Mama

へび女 (Hebi Onna)
- Genre: Horror
- Created by: Kazuo Umezu
- Manga
- Written by: Kazuo Umezu
- Published by: Kodansha, Shogakukan
- English publisher: NA: IDW Publishing
- Magazine: Shūkan Shōjo Friend
- Original run: Scared of Mama; August 10, 1965 – September 7, 1965; The Spotted Girl; September 14, 1965 – November 9, 1965; Reptilia (Hebi Shōjo); March 15, 1966 – June 21, 1966
- Adaptations
- The Snake Girl and the Silver-Haired Witch (film, 1968); Kazuo Umezu's Horror Theater: Snake Girl (film, 2005)

Hebi Onna (へび女; transl. "Snake Woman"), published in English under the title Reptilia, is a Japanese horror manga trilogy written and illustrated by Kazuo Umezu. It is composed of three series – Scared of Mama, The Spotted Girl, and Reptilia – which were originally serialized in the shōjo manga (girls' comics) magazine Shūkan Shōjo Friend from 1965 to 1966. The individual series were not originally conceived as an ongoing story but were later revised to form a connected trilogy, which was published as a single volume by Shogakukan in 1986. An English-language translation of the trilogy was published by IDW Publishing in 2007.

The trilogy follows a monstrous woman who is able to transform into a snake-like being. Umezu drew inspiration for the series from Japanese folklore, particularly stories about yōkai (supernatural beings), and conceived of a story about a monstrous mother figure as a critical response to the recurring motif of loving mother-daughter relationships common in shōjo manga of the 1960s. The series was Umezu's first major critical and commercial success and is credited with provoking a boom in the production of horror manga in the late 1960s. Two of the three stories in the trilogy have been adapted into live-action films.

== Synopsis ==
The trilogy is composed of three series: Scared of Mama, The Spotted Girl, and Reptilia, the last of which was originally published in Japan under the title Hebi Shōjo (へび少女; "Snake Girl"). The following summarizes the plot of the Shogakukan edition, though other editions have minor differences in plot and setting (see Original publication below).

Scared of Mama (ママがこわい, Mama ga Kowai)
Yumiko, a young girl living in Tokyo, visits her hospitalized mother. Her mother discusses rumors among the patients of an institutionalized woman in the hospital who believes that she is a snake, which Yumiko investigates. Yumiko discovers the rumored patient, who transforms into a snake-like being and breaks out of confinement after Yumiko obliges her request to show her a picture of a frog. The snake-woman usurps the place of Yumiko's mother, though Yumiko is ultimately able to expose her deception, and the snake-woman is re-institutionalized.

The Spotted Girl (まだらの少女, Madara no Shōjo)
A sequel to Scared of Mama. The snake-woman escapes from the hospital and pursues Yumiko, who is on vacation in the mountains of Nagano Prefecture with her cousin Kyōko. Kyoko and her family are transformed into snake-people, though Yumiko is ultimately able to defeat the snake-woman at the conclusion of the story.

Reptilia (へび少女, Hebi Shōjo)
A prequel to Scared of Mama. In 1907, a man encounters a snake-woman in a swamp while hunting. He flees after shooting her in the eye, but turns manic and dies shortly thereafter. Decades later, the snake-woman seeks revenge on the hunter's granddaughter Yoko by killing Yoko's caretaker aunt, adopting the newly orphaned girl, and transforming Yoko into a snake-girl by feeding her one of her scales. The transformation is witnessed by Yoko's best friend Satsuki; they pursue Satsuki, but Yoko turns on her mother and both are washed away in flooding from a heavy rain. The story concludes in the hospital from Scared of Mama, where doctors discuss an institutionalized patient who was recovered from a river twenty years prior, and who believes that she is a snake.

== Production ==
=== Context ===
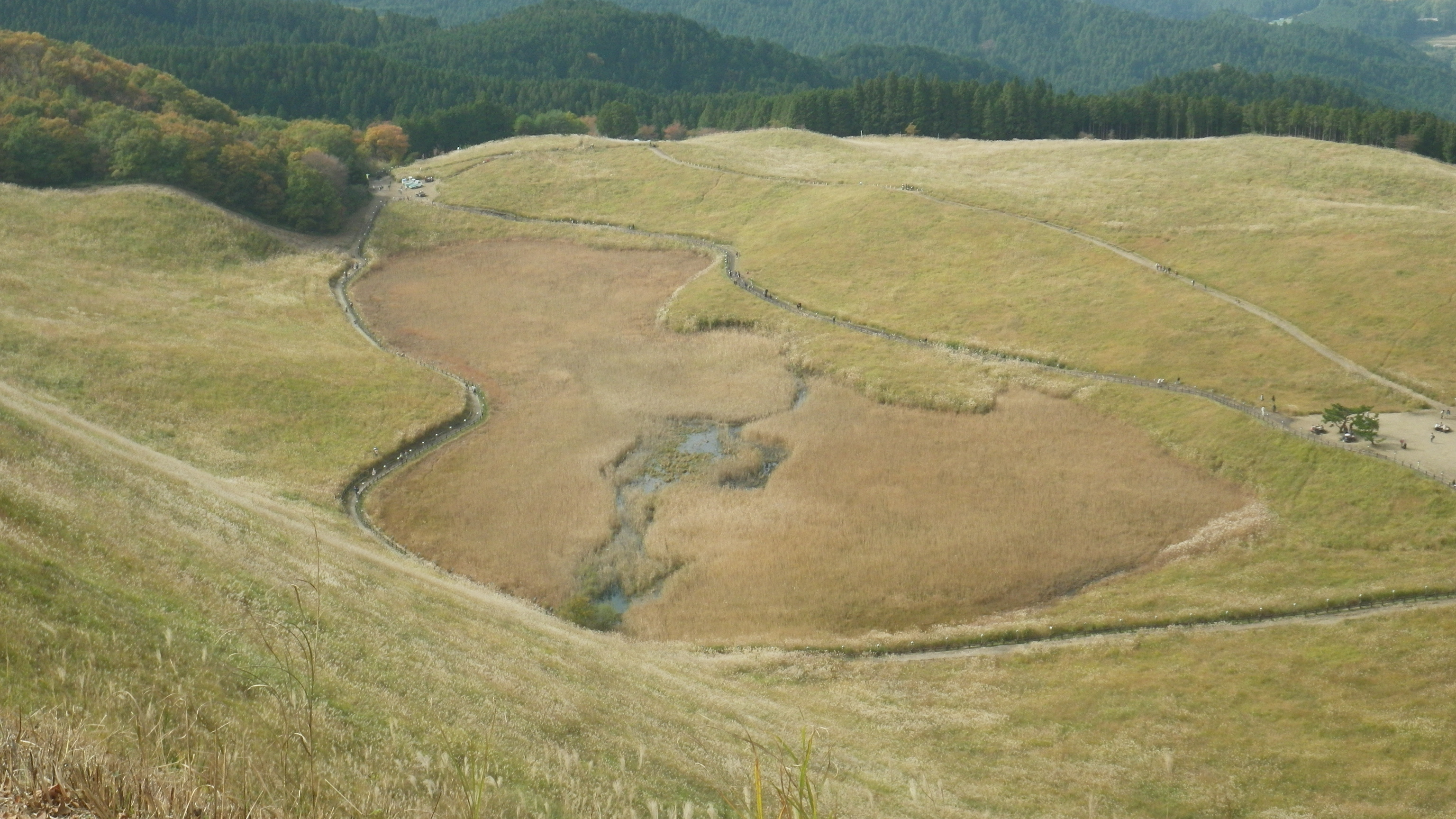
The Okameike Moor, the setting of Okameike Densetsu

As a child, manga artist Kazuo Umezu's father told him horror stories from Japanese folklore. The story he found most terrifying was Okameike Densetsu (お亀池伝説; lit. "The Legend of the Turtle Pond"), which tells the story of a woman who goes to the Okameike Moor in Soni, Nara, and is transformed into a snake. The story significantly influenced Umezu, and snake-women became a recurring motif in Umezu's manga beginning with Kuchi ga Mimi Made Sakeru Toki (口が耳までさける時) in 1961.

During the 1960s, shōjo manga was typically published either in manga magazines or in books offered at kashi-hon (book rental stores); horror stories were popular in kashi-hon books but were not published in manga magazines. Umezu, who had already created several shōjo stories, stated that he "harbored suspicion" toward the recurring motif of close mother-daughter relationships in shōjo manga of the era, explaining that "mothers often think of their daughters as their own possessions, which is a scary thought". He sought to create a story that subverted this motif by depicting a mother as a monstrous rather than loving figure, drawing inspiration from the snake-woman of Okameike Densetsu.

=== Original publication ===
All three entries in the trilogy were originally serialized in the manga magazine Shūkan Shōjo Friend, published by Kodansha:

- I'm Afraid of Mama was serialized from August 10, 1965 (#32) to September 7, 1965 (#36)
- The Spotted Girl was serialized from September 14, 1965 (#37) to November 9, 1965 (#45)
- Reptilia (Hebi Shōjo) was serialized from March 15, 1966 (#11) to June 21, 1966 (#25)

The individual chapters of the series were also published as kashi-hon by Sato Production (佐藤プロダクション) in its Hana (花) collection.

The stories were not originally conceived as forming a trilogy: while The Spotted Girl was a direct sequel to I'm Afraid of Mama, Reptilia (Hebi Shōjo) was originally published as part of Umezu's series Yamabiko Shimai (山びこ姉妹; transl. "The Sisters of the Mountain"). Yamabiko Shimai is a series of stories set in Nara in which sisters Satsuki and Kanna are confronted with various paranormal phenomena that originate from legends associated with the region. The series consists of Kitsune-tsuki Shōjo (狐つき少女; transl. "The Girl with a Fox Spirit") in 1963, Hebi Oba-San (へびおばさん; transl. "Aunt Snake") in 1964, Kitsune ga Kureta ki no Happa (狐がくれた木葉っぱ; transl. "The Fox That Gave me a Tree Leaf") in 1965, and finally Hebi Shōjo in 1966.

The series also had several plot differences in its original publication run, chiefly its setting of Yoshino District, Nara, rather than Nagano. The Yamabiko Shimai version of Hebi Shōjo also has a happier ending, in which Yōko is turned back into a normal girl with the help of Satsuki and her friends.

=== Later editions ===
After their serializations concluded, all three stories were subsequently published in various anthologies of short stories by Umezu. In 1986, the publishing company Shogakukan published all three stories in a single volume titled Hebi Onna: Umezu Kazuo Kyōfu Gekijō (び女・楳図かずお恐怖劇場; transl. "Snake Woman: Kazuo Umezu's Horror Theater") The Shogakukan edition modifies the artwork and dialogue of the stories to make them into a connected trilogy, most notably altering the setting of the series and Yōko's fate at the conclusion of Reptilia (Hebi Shōjo). Shogakukan republished Hebi Onna in 2005 as part of Umezz Perfection!, a complete collection of Umezu's works to mark the 50th anniversary of his debut as a manga artist. Kadokawa Shoten published the trilogy in 2000 under the title Hebi Shōjo.

In North America, an English-language translation of Hebi Onna based on the Kadokawa Shoten edition was published in 2007 by IDW Publishing under the title Reptilia. The series, which was published as a single unflipped omnibus edition, was the first manga series published by IDW. The omnibus features an original cover illustration by artist Ashley Wood.

== Analysis ==
=== Narrative and themes ===
The trilogy is a psychological horror story focused on "the dark recesses of the human soul" to the general exclusion of displays of blood and gore, though it nonetheless utilizes typical horror story conventions of suspense, anticipation, surprise, and the placing protagonists into situations from which they are menaced or cannot escape. The story also utilizes some clichés typical of the horror genre, such as a female protagonist with little to no backstory and authority figures who are unhelpful or absent.

Transformation is a common theme in many works by Umezu, as in Negai (1975) and Mushi-tachi no Ie. In this case, the transformation concerns that of the "monster that dwells in us", which novelist Hitomi Kanehara describes in her postface to a collected edition of the series as a "mysterious being, unable itself to explain its behavior, which sets up a dark and troubled atmosphere, and has something repulsive about it." Kanehara attributes the fascination and fear of characters who suddenly transform to the Japanese ghost stories collected by Koizumi Yakumo—particularly Mujina from Kwaidan: Stories and Studies of Strange Things, which features the noppera-bō, a humanoid yōkai that can make its face disappear.

Family similarly recurs as a common theme in Umezu's manga and appears as a major theme in all three stories in the trilogy. In the 1960s, shōjo manga regularly focused on mother-daughter relationships, and the haha mono (母もの; lit. "story of maternal love") story formula of a daughter searching for her beloved missing mother was especially popular. In the trilogy, Umezu subverts this story formula by creating a monstrous mother figure who seeks to actively harm her daughter. By placing a mother character in a negative light, Umezu is seen as breaking down the idealized image of the mother common in shōjo manga of the era.

=== The "snake-woman" archetype ===
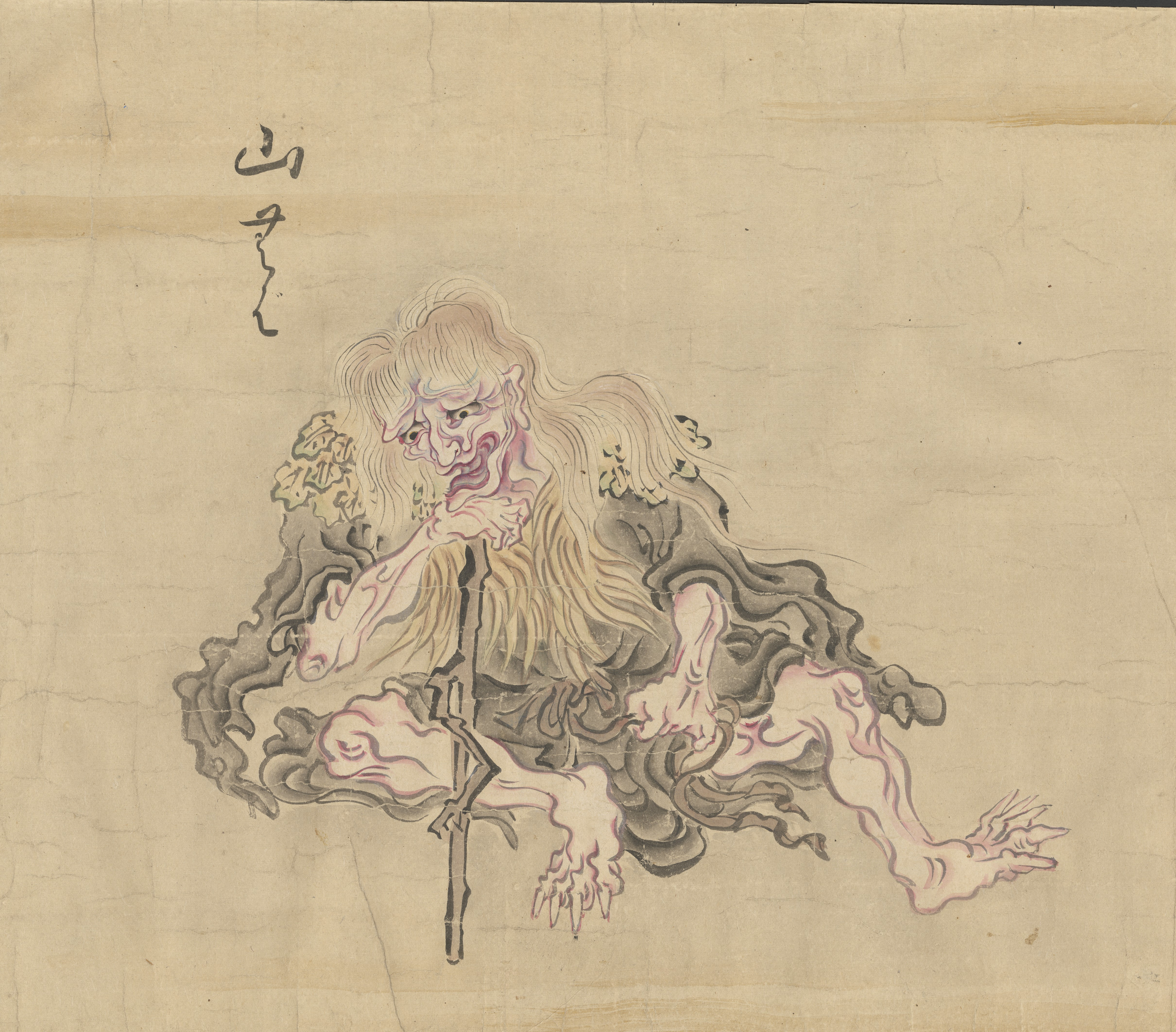
Yama-uba, the likely inspiration for the snake-woman

The snake-woman is a yōkai with serpentine physical and behavioral characteristics, including skin covered in scales and a deformed mouth filled with sharp teeth. She is able to assume a human appearance, a technique she uses to approach her prey, whom she then devours. The snake-woman may also seek to pass her curse along to others and create a family in her image.

This tendency of the snake-women to turn others into snake-people has been likened to the western vampire, a creature which does not appear in Japanese folklore. Critic Stéphane du Mesnildot argues this tendency introduces a feminist dimension to the snake-women figure that makes it representative of "the dark side of femininity, and very often, its revenge on an unjust and authoritarian masculine society". The figure is likely inspired by the yōkai Yama-uba, which, like the snake-woman, represents the archetype of the socially maladjusted woman in Japanese folklore.

=== Visual style ===
In contrast to the dark and realist style of Umezu's later works, the art style of the trilogy is simple, bright, and occasionally child-like. The girls who serve as the protagonists of the stories are drawn in a style typical of shōjo manga of their era: influenced by the art of Macoto Takahashi, with basic designs that emphasize their beauty, innocence, and purity. Particular emphasis is placed on their eyes, which are large, bright, and possess a star-shaped detail next to their pupil. Their design starkly contrasts that of the grotesque snake-woman; this was a visual innovation for shōjo manga, which at the time almost invariably depicted only cute and beautiful characters.

== Reception and legacy ==
Scared of Mama was a critical and commercial success upon its release, and its popularity is credited with prompting a boom in the production of horror manga in the late 1960s. Manga scholar Hiromi Dollase attributes the series' success to Umezu's subversion of the loving maternal shōjo manga figure, which broke the artistic codes and conventions of shōjo manga of the era. The monstrous mother became a common motif in horror shōjo manga in the wake of Scared of Mama's success. Horror manga artist Kanako Inuki considers Reptilia to be her favorite horror manga: "This scared me so much when I first stumbled on it during kindergarten that I wanted to cry. But it was also the gateway to my horror manga addiction."

Two of the three stories in the trilogy have been adapted into films. Scared of Mama was adapted along with Umezu's Akanbon Shōjo (赤ん坊少女) into the 1968 film The Snake Girl and the Silver-Haired Witch, while the 2005 film Kazuo Umezu's Horror Theater: Snake Girl (楳図かずお恐怖劇場 まだらの少女, Umezu Kazuo kyōfu gekijō: Madara no shōjo), also known as Kazuo Umezu's Horror Theater: The Harlequin Girl, contains an adaptation of The Spotted Girl.
