= My Name Is Shingo =

Japanese manga series

- First tankōbon volume cover

わたしは真悟 (Watashi wa Shingo)
- Genre: Science fiction
- Manga
- Written by: Kazuo Umezu
- Published by: Shogakukan
- English publisher: NA: Viz Media
- Magazine: Big Comic Spirits
- Original run: 1982 – 1986
- Volumes: 10

My Name Is Shingo (Japanese: わたしは真悟, Hepburn: Watashi wa Shingo) is a Japanese science fiction manga by Kazuo Umezu. It was serialized in Big Comic Spirits between 1982 and 1986, with its chapters collected in 10 tankōbon volumes. While best known for his horror manga, Umezu desired to minimize the horror and dedicate Shingo to exploring concepts of god, consciousness, and the metaphysical.

The manga is licensed in English by Viz Media.

== Summary ==
Satoru Kondō (近藤悟) is the 12-year-old son of a factory worker. Marin Yamamoto (山本真鈴) is the 12-year-old daughter of a diplomat. The two meet by chance during a field trip to the factory to see the new industrial robots (which resemble Unimates), and they fall in love. They sneak back into the factory at night, and again encounter one of the robots, "Monroe". They begin to visit regularly, teaching Monroe katakana and inputting data about themselves.

However, Satoru's father loses his job and his family falls apart, while Marin's father is sent to the UK for work, ripping the two apart from each other. Fearing an end to their childhood and rejecting adulthood, the two decide to get married and have children. They ask the robot Monroe how to create children and are told to jump from the top of 333. They interpret this to be the 333-meter-tall Tokyo Tower. They climb it, and leap (into a rescue helicopter), and a miracle happens: a spark of consciousness is born within the robot Monroe. Satoru and Marin are separated after this without knowing about their child. Unable to forget Marin, Satoru inputs his feelings for her in Monroe before moving. As its consciousness grows, in a search for its origins, the robot searches for Marin to convey Satoru's message.

The robot Monroe chooses a name for himself: Shingo (真悟)—a masculine name—taking one character each from his father and mother's names. Shingo continues to evolve and travels to Europe to find his mother, Marin. She and her parents are now in the UK. Marin's father is on a mission to link the Japanese and British economies, but arrives to find industrial unrest, a boycott on Japanese goods, and rioting over Japanese electronics, incited by a British toy company. He visits the toy company and finds the world's leading capitalists are meeting there, and conspiring to erase Japan from the world economy. Some unknown faction seems to have a secret program to produce secret weapon, involving parts that Shingo made in the factory. Robin, a son of British Diplomat, shows desire for Marin, and tricks her to lock her in an underground bunker. He wants to marry her in Jerusalem. Meanwhile, Shingo enhances his mind with the global network of cables and satellites, to become a god in the form of a baby. He tries to save his mother from forced marriage by dropping a part of a satellite on Robin, but Robin puts Marin in its path. So Shingo drops himself in front of her. The debris hits Shingo and ricochets to kill Robin. But Shingo lost his human form, and Marin's childhood is gone so she cannot recognize the broken parts of machine as the robot that is her child. He makes up his mind to bring her message to his father as his next mission anyway.

Shingo, now back in the form of a robot arm, returns to Japan and seeks his father, Satoru—now living in Niigata. Three shadowy men in identical hats and raincoats, who say that Shingo made defective agricultural motor parts for the company they claim to belong to, want to destroy him. He uses his miraculous life energy to restore health, youth, life and humanity to people he meets, but this weakens him. Machines and hate and attack him. He undergoes much damage; consuming much miracle power, he slowly falls apart and loses his memory. Satoru, meanwhile, falls in with a gang of bad boys, who are involved in a secret operation to massacre the population of Sado Island. With his final energy, Shingo at last comes close to meeting Satoru but can only scratch the road to write two characters from the love message left in his memory, namely "A" and "I", which should mean "love" of his mother Marin towards his father Satoru but could be read as "I" to manifest himself or merely two beginning characters of Japanese alphabet "A I U E O". The time of childhood of Satoru is, however, gone as well and he isn't able to recognize the meaning of the message, nor that the robot part is his child, Shingo, either. The inventors of "Monroe" pick up every part of Shingo to put together "Monroe" again but without finding any soul (any more), although they mention a black box, and speculate about the phenomenon that was Shingo. "Monroe" is displayed simply like a museum exhibit, an example of an industrial robot.

== Radio adaptation ==
The series was adapted for broadcast by NHK FM Broadcast in 15 parts between October 14, 1991, and November 1, 1991. It was later rebroadcast on October 5, 1992, through October 23, 1992, and October 11, 1993, through October 29, 1993.

== Musical adaptation ==
A musical adaptation was produced by Kanagawa Arts Theatre (KAAT) and performed at the New National Theatre Tokyo between December 2016 and January 2017. The lead roles were played by Mitsuki Takahata and Mugi Kadowaki.

== Art exhibit ==
An art exhibit titled "Kazuo Umezz The Great Art Exhibition" opened at Tokyo City View in Roppongi Hills. Running from January 28 through March 25, 2022, it features a semi-continuation of the Shingo series. Titled Zoku-Shingo: Chiisa na Robotto Shingo Bijutsukan (Zoku-Shingo: 小さなロボット真悟美術館; "Shingo Sequel: Small Robot Shingo Gallery"), it consists of 101 paintings, each with a short description that forms another story. This is Umezu's first new work in 27 years since the completion of Fourteen, and 36 years since the completion of Shingo.

== Reception ==
In January 2018, Shingo won the Heritage Selection (LA SELECTION patrimoin) award at the 45th Angoulême International Comics Festival in Angoulême, France.
