= Fourteen (manga) =

Japanese manga series

14歳 (Fōtīn)
- Genre: Horror, Science fiction
- Manga
- Written by: Kazuo Umezu
- Published by: Shogakukan
- Magazine: Big Comic Spirits
- Original run: 1990 – 1995
- Volumes: 20 (original); 4 (Perfection)

Fourteen (14歳, Fōtīn) is a horror, science fiction manga by Kazuo Umezu. It was serialized in Big Comic Spirits between 1990 and 1995 with 20 volumes released. A new final chapter was added in the 2012 Perfection release.

== Overview ==
Fourteen is a spiritual sequel to The Drifting Classroom. While The Drifting Classroom illustrated a future after the fall of mankind, Fourteen illustrates how the destruction of mankind occurs. Other themes include child protagonists attempting to overcome environmental destruction and crises, as well as the bond and separation between parent and child.

In 1995, the series came to a sudden end due to Umezu's tenosynovitis. In 2012, a new final chapter consisting of 18 full-color pages was appended to the final volume of the Perfection release.

== Story ==
In the 22nd century, mankind seems to be flourishing, but they are facing an approaching destruction. At a chicken manufacturing plant, a heteromorphic creature with a bird's head—later known as Chicken George—appears from the fermenter. Chicken George studies and learns all human knowledge. He learns that all mankind and the planet will come to an end when children born that year reach the age of 14. With the goal of escaping planetary destruction due to mankind, he builds a planetary escape rocket, Tyrannosaurus, to carry the animals. However, Chicken George, falling for the beautiful Barbra, a minion of the rich Rose and American vice president Martha Gorman, decides to stay on Earth and chooses to de-evolve by separating the left and right hemispheres of his brain.

Eventually, aliens facing the same destruction as humanity appear. They rape humanity in a desire for sharing DNA in order to survive, but soon realize that there is no future for human DNA and instead steal spiritual energy from the Earth and leave. The Earth's balance is destroyed, causing massive earthquakes, tsunamis, and quicksand, resulting in a massive population decrease. The governments for each country were preparing a secret plan to select specific children to escape from Earth, but that came to an end due to violent mobs. Finally, as mankind comes to an end, humanity's true form began to manifest: monsters.

The selected children board the alternative rocket Tyrannosaurus and escape from Earth, but they face problems with the approaching 14 years time limit, as well as the spirit of Chicken George who has possessed the rocket. In addition, the destruction does not end with Earth, but also extends to their destination in the Andromeda Galaxy. Facing increasing problems, those close to 14 years go into hibernation.

America, the youngest of the children, sees the light of edge of the universe from Tyrannosaurus. As all things are being destroyed, America jumps beyond the edge of space. He appears in another universe and realizes that their universe existed within a single caterpillar in the middle of a road, and that the impending death of the caterpillar about to be run over by a car was the cause of his universe's impending death. After saving the caterpillar, America and the other children return to their universe and decide to go home.
