= Tarantula (novel) =

1984 novel by Thierry Jonquet

Mygale (novel)
- English-language cover for Tarantula (translation of French Mygale)
- Author: Thierry Jonquet
- Language: French
- Genre: Science fiction
- Publisher: Editions Gallimard
- Publication date: 1984
- Publication place: France
- Media type: Print
- ISBN: 978-2-07-039274-2

Mygale is a crime sci-fi thriller novel by Thierry Jonquet, first published in France by Editions Gallimard in 1984, and then in the United States in 2003 by City Lights. Its English translation was also published by Serpent's Tail in the United Kingdom and North America in 2005 as Tarantula, and it has also been released under the title The Skin I Live In, the title of Pedro Almodóvar's film of the same name, which was inspired by the novel.

== Plot ==
Richard Lafargue is a renowned plastic surgeon keeping a young woman, "Eve", locked against her will in his villa. Alex Barny, a wanted fugitive after robbing a bank, decides to change the look of his face in order to avoid capture. He contacts Lafargue about the procedure and arranges to meet at his home.

Another story surrounding a young man named Vincent Moreau is also told via first person narrative. After raping Lafargue's daughter (resulting in her mental and emotional deterioration), Vincent is captured and imprisoned by the plastic surgeon. At first, Vincent does not know the identity of his captor, but discovers it after suffering a series of brutal and twisted acts of torture.

Eventually, it is revealed that "Eve" is actually Vincent. As both an act of revenge and an attempt to replace the daughter that was destroyed, Lafargue performs a sex change operation on the imprisoned Vincent, and forces him to live as his wife. Throughout the story, Vincent struggles with the horror of what was done to him and the erasure of his own identity. He maintains fragments of his personality, and seems to despise Lafargue at times.

In the final sequence, Alex arrives at Lafargue's home, but meets Vincent, transformed as Eve. Vincent instantly recognizes Alex as his former criminal accomplice, who was also present during the rape of Lafargue's daughter. During an altercation, Lafargue shoots and kills Alex in front of Vincent. Vincent appears to have given up on holding on to his former identity and desire to escape when he submits to becoming Eve and helps Lafargue cover up the incident.

== Reception ==
The cover of the US release has a blurb from a review from The Washington Post, calling the book, "An unholy collaboration between Sade and Sartre, with occasional comic interventions by that honorary Frenchman Jerry Lewis."

== Film ==
Mygale also inspired the 2011 film The Skin I Live In.
