= Kazuo Umezu =

Japanese manga artist (1936–2024)

- 楳図 かずお
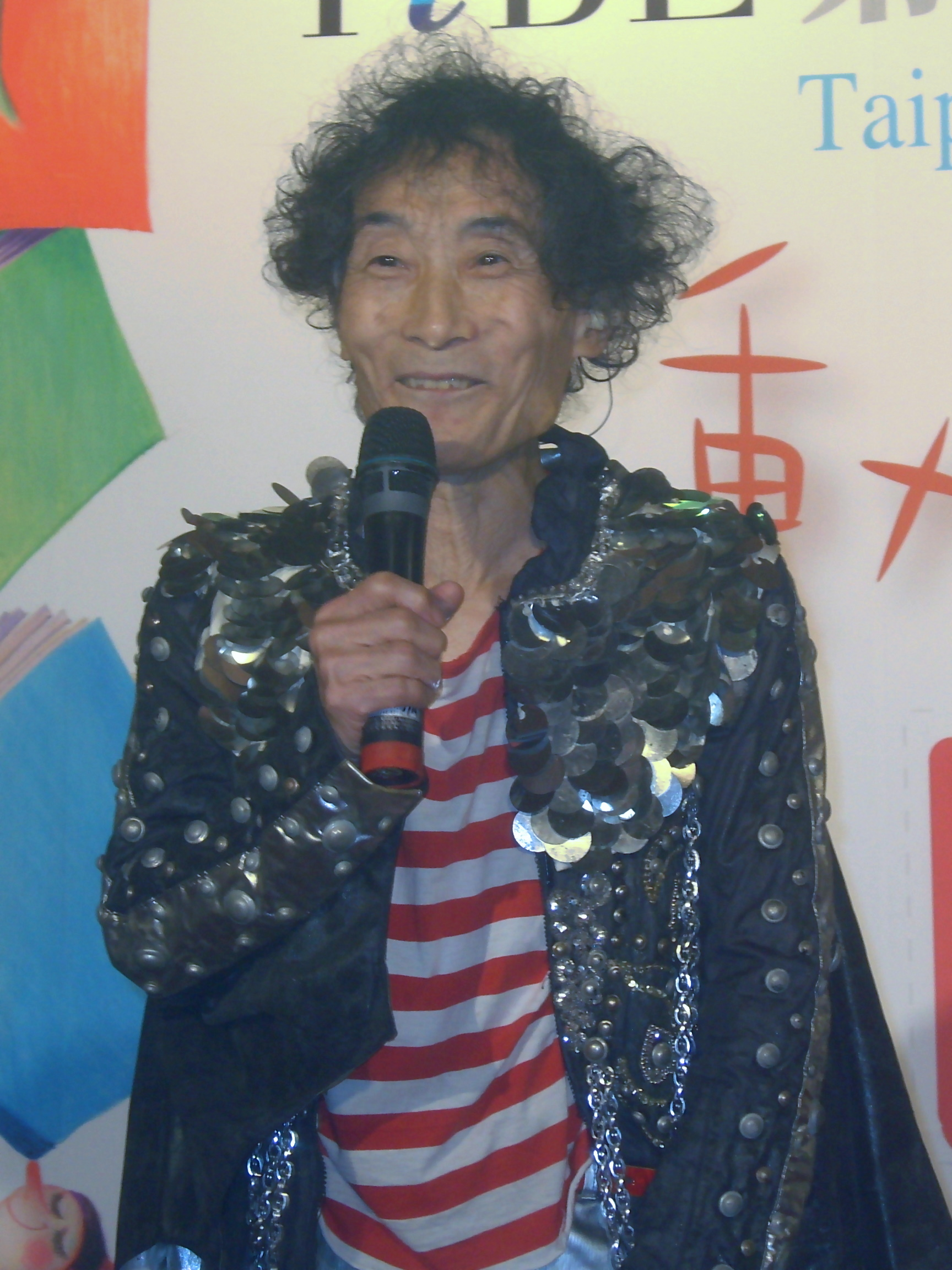
- Umezu in 2010
- Born: September 3, 1936; Kōya, Empire of Japan
- Died: October 28, 2024 (aged 88)
- Occupation: Manga artist
- Years active: 1950s–2024

Kazuo Umezu or Kazuo Umezz (楳図 かずお, Umezu Kazuo; birth name 楳図一雄; September 3, 1936 – October 28, 2024) was a Japanese manga artist, musician and actor. Starting his career in the 1950s, he is among the most famous artists of horror manga and has been vital for its development, considered the "god of horror manga". In 1960s shōjo manga like Reptilia, he broke the industry's conventions by combining the aesthetics of the commercial manga industry with gruesome visual imagery inspired by Japanese folktales, which created a boom of horror manga and influenced manga artists of following generations. He created successful manga series such as The Drifting Classroom, Makoto-chan and My Name Is Shingo, until he retired from drawing manga in the mid 1990s. He was a public figure in Japan, known for wearing red-and-white-striped shirts and doing his signature "Gwash" hand gesture.

== Life and career ==
=== Early life and career ===
Umezu was born on September 3, 1936, in Kōya, Wakayama Prefecture, but raised in the mountainous Gojō, Nara Prefecture. His mother motivated him to start drawing when he was seven years old. His father would tell him local legends about ghost and snake women before going to bed. He was inspired to start drawing manga by reading Osamu Tezuka's Shin Takarajima in fifth grade. He was part of a drawing circle with others called "Kaiman Club".

In 1955, he published his first manga at the age of 18 with Mori no Kyōdai based on the fairytale Hansel and Gretel with the kashihon publisher Tomo Book. He would soon shift towards the gekiga movement and publish manga in the kashi-hon industry in Osaka of the time, which would allow him more freedom than serializing his manga in magazines. His specialty was to include paranormal elements in his stories. At the same time, he also started working on shōjo manga; he published in the magazine Shōjo Book and the kashi-hon anthology Niji.

=== Breakthrough in the 1960s and 1970s ===
After moving to Tokyo in 1963 due to the decline of the kashihon industry, he developed his specific style, which blended the aesthetics of shōjo manga with grotesque horror visuals and broke with conventions of shōjo manga at the time. Horror manga like Nekome no Shōjo and Reptilia became a hit in the commercial shōjo manga magazine Shōjo Friend in the mid 1960s.

In the late 1960s, he also started publishing in shōnen manga magazines and he switched publishing houses, from Kodansha to Shogakukan, when a new editor asked him to draw something other than horror manga. He became a well established author and was at times working at up to five serials at the same time. In 1974 he won the 20th Shogakukan Manga Award for his series The Drifting Classroom about a school including its schoolchildren and teachers being teleported into an alternate post-apocalyptic universe.

In 1975, Umezu started becoming a public figure also apart from creating manga. He recorded songs based on his horror manga and released them as the solo album Yami no Album.

His comedy manga Makoto-chan, which he published from 1976 to 1981 in Weekly Shōnen Sunday, became a hit. The hand gesture "Gwash" from the manga became Umezu's own trademark hand gesture as well in public.

=== Late career ===
In the 1980s and 1990s, he focused on science fiction manga depicting a near future like My Name Is Shingo and Fourteen.

In 1995, he had to retire from regular publishing due to tendinitis after finishing Fourteen. He then became even more of a public figure, appearing regularly on TV in a red and white striped shirt. He was also famous for the architecture of his candy-striped home in Kichijōji, inspired by his Makoto-chan series. In 2011, he released a second music album with his songs.

In 2018 he was awarded the Prize for Inheritance at the Angoulême International Comics Festival for the French translation of My Name Is Shingo. This was the second prize awarded to him throughout his career and Umezu had previously been unhappy about the amount of recognition he had gotten for his work. The award motivated him to start working again and he produced a series of 101 paintings based on My Name Is Shingo, which were exhibited for the first time in 2022 and were his first new work in 27 years.

=== Death ===
In July 2024, Umezu was hospitalized after collapsing at his home in Kichijōji, Tokyo. He was diagnosed with terminal stomach cancer, but did not undergo surgery, remaining in hospice care from September. On November 5, 2024, Shogakukan announced that Umezu died on October 28. He was 88. A private funeral was held by his family and close friends. Umezu was planning a new work prior to his death.

On May 28, 2025, a public farewell ceremony was held at a hotel in Kichijōji. Flowers were available for fans to be placed on a stand for the deceased. There was a line to enter the hotel that extended several blocks outside. Participants included Machiko Satonaka, Junji Itō, Noboru Takahashi, and Shōko Nakagawa.

== Style and themes ==
=== "Fear manga" ===
Umezu coined the term "fear manga" (kyōfu manga) in 1961 to describe his work, consciously distinguishing it from "weird tale" (kaiki) manga, which he felt overemphasized grotesque visuals. For Umezu, true "fear" was something that "makes you shudder even if you can't see it." Scholar Akihiko Takahashi argues that Umezu's "fear manga" was established when he broke the implicit constraint that "weird tales were for boys" and "fantasy was for girls", synthesizing these elements. A key transitional work was The Moment the Mouth Splits to the Ears (1962), the first to be explicitly labeled a "fear manga."

Umezu's own commentary and common criticism posit a linear evolution from "physiological fear" (e.g., motifs of snakes, spiders) in the mid-1960s to "psychological fear" in the late 1960s. Takahashi problematizes this, noting that psychological terror was present from the start. He posits that "fear" is the fundamental concept that subsumes both the "weird" and the distinction between physiological and psychological terror, representing a deeper, more holistic approach to the human condition.

A core philosophical underpinning of Umezu's work is a form of perspectivism. He articulated that whether a reader finds something "scary" or "funny" depends entirely on their standpoint: "If you're the one being chased, it's horror. If you're the one chasing, it's a gag." This "perspectivalism" (enkinhō shugi), where value is not inherent in the object but dependent on the viewer's position, became a defining feature of his 1968–1973 works like the Scary Book (Kowai Hon) series. Takahashi extends this, arguing that Umezu's relativism applies not just to horror and comedy, but to fundamental dichotomies like good/evil, beauty/ugliness, and truth/falsehood. His narratives often reveal the "ugly moral interior" of seemingly respectable characters, with the horror stemming from their painful self-awareness.

=== Folklore, monsters and theology ===
His work is influenced by Japanese folklore. Manga artist and critic Sakumi Yoshino explains that his horror manga is related to religion in Japan, as monsters and demons are not considered completely evil, and Umezu wants readers to sometimes also feel compassion for the monsters in his works. However, scholar Akihiko Takahashi cautions against interpreting this simply as an expression of "Japanese native spirituality or folkloric spirit", arguing that for Umezu, folklore served primarily as raw material and inspiration for story construction, not as an attempt to express or manifest a mystical otherworld. In series like Cat Eyed Boy, Umezu wove local yōkai (monster) culture with historical events, yet often created entirely original monstrous beings to serve his narratives. Scholar Ryōichi Hosokawa notes that Umezu integrates factual events, such as the 1946 Nankai earthquake which the author lived through, into these supernatural frameworks.

In his later works from the mid-1980s onward, such as My Name Is Shingo and God's Left Hand, Devil's Right Hand, Umezu increasingly used the motif of a transcendent "God." Takahashi, building on the analysis of Yoshiyuki Koizumi, argues that Umezu does not depict a traditional, absolute deity governing a separate world. Instead, he presents a structure of infinite regression (e.g., a guardian spirit that itself has a guardian spirit), undermining the concept of a singular, original transcendent being. This approach introduces a simulacral structure to spiritual manga, challenging Platonic hierarchies and affirming both the "real" world and other accessible worlds simultaneously.

=== Intergenerational conflict and the family ===
A central and recurrent theme in Umezu's horror is intergenerational conflict, domestic violence, and the fragility of the family unit. Umezu considered children and women, according to him the "people most often victimized in this world", as the best vessels for conveying horror, noting a primal quality in their fear.

Critic Helen Chazan notes that many of his stories revolve around "a terror that the family could turn violent or be revealed as violent", exploring the dissonance between the idealized family and the actual resentments and cruelties experienced within it. Umezu initially focused on this topic as he found that relationships between mothers and children in shōjo manga in the early 1960s were portrayed only as caring, never as scary. His manga Reptilia depicts an intense conflict between a schoolgirl and her sick mother, who turns out to be a snake woman when she visits her in hospital. Manga scholar Tsuchiya Dollase compares this character with the Jungian "Terrible Mother".

Works like The Drifting Classroom begin with a child's argument with an unfair parent, with the narrative later transforming the absent mother into a protective, almost religious icon, depicting the gap between real familial conflict and idealized maternal compassion. In series such as Cat Eyed Boy (1967–68, 1976) and Orochi (1969–70), family trauma and dark parental secrets are more prevalent than traditional monsters. Cat Eyed Boy frequently features fathers defined by a repulsive past that erupts into their children's lives, while Orochi often focuses on matrilineal horror, with stories of sisters tormenting each other or wives fearing resurrected husbands. The short story "Prodigy" (from Orochi) exemplifies Umezu's intricate portrayal of cyclical abuse: a mother abuses a child she secretly adopted after her own son died, driven by hatred for the biological father, a thief. The family's eventual "happy" reconciliation is built on a foundation of cruelty and lies, critiquing the societal pressure for familial and academic success regardless of emotional truth. Chazan argues that Umezu does not necessarily hate the nuclear family, but instead "prods at tensions implicit in justifying the nuclear family" by depicting the "unthinkable, the unspeakable: child abuse and cycles of familial violence."

=== Visual style ===
Umezu developed a distinctive visual style that synthesized elements from shōjo manga and horror. Scholar Jon Holt argues that Umezu's technique of using tight, oblique close-up panels on characters' eyes blends the deep interiority expected in shōjo manga with expressions of fear and disgust central to horror. These eye close-ups often function to slow the narrative, intensifying a character's moment of psychological realization or self-loathing. Holt analyzes these sequences as often operating simultaneously as both "subject-to-subject" and "aspect-to-aspect" panel transitions (using Scott McCloud's taxonomy), creating a sophisticated rhythm that emphasizes mood and internal crisis. Akihiko Takahashi proposes that Umezu's excessively slow, nuanced focus requires a new "iterative" (hanpuku) category of panel transition. Katō Mikirō describes the "eye flares" in Umezu's characters as creating an "extreme slow-motion effect" that focuses the reader on an explosive internal realization, often of a character's own flawed nature or complicity.

His visual approach evolved over time; the introspective eye close-ups prevalent in 1960s works, which conveyed "physiological" or "psychological" fear, gave way in his 1970s stories to a more dispassionate perspective focused on "societal fear" (shakaiteki na kyōfu).

== Reception and legacy ==
His works inspired a new generation of horror manga artists. Junji Ito, Toru Yamazaki and Minetarō Mochizuki cite him as one of their biggest influences and Kanako Inuki got her career start in a magazine compiled by him. Rumiko Takahashi briefly worked as an assistant for him, while he was working on Makoto-chan. His reputation gave him the nickname "god of horror manga" (ホラーまんがの神様) in Japanese media.

Umezu's manga broke with the norms of the commercial manga industry at the time that he started publishing in major magazines in the mid 1960s and created a boom around horror manga in the late 1960s. Tsuchiya Dollase writes: "The monstrous mothers must certainly have scared the audience; at the same time, however, the torture of the pretty but superficial heroines by these horrifying mothers must have given the same audience a certain pleasure."

Umezu regularly received complaint letters from parents in the beginning of his career due to his horror visuals and also editors of magazines would ask him to scale down the violence in his imagery. He remarks in an interview: "I was protested but never boycotted. I considered such criticism to be a form of praise." He was critical of watering down horror elements: "Old Japanese folk stories and fairy tales could be unflinchingly brutal. They come from a time when tragedy and carnage was an everyday part of life. Now we have people calling to water them down, which essentially whitewashes history. It's insulting to the memory of those who suffered to bring us these stories."

Besides his impact on the development of horror manga, scholar Tomoko Yamada counts Umezu as one of the shōjo manga artists in the 1950s who contributed to the development of ballet manga with his series Haha Yobu Koe (1958) and Maboroshi Shōjo (1959).

In 2019, Umezu received the Commissioner for Cultural Affairs award from the Agency for Cultural Affairs. It is an award for "individuals who have made distinguished accomplishment in artistic and cultural activities". It is rarely awarded to people in the manga industry.

== Assistants ==
- Noboru Takahashi
- Robin Nishi
- Rumiko Takahashi

== Works ==
=== Manga ===
Original title	English title	Year	Notes
Mori no Kyōdai (森の兄妹)	Siblings of the Forest	1955	published by Tomo Book
Haha Yobu Koe (母呼ぶこえ)		1958	one-shot in Shōjo Book
Ningyō Shōjo (人形少女)		1959	published by Tōhō Mangasha
Maboroshi Shōjo (まぼろし少女)		1959	serialized in Niji
Romansu no Kusuri (ロマンスの薬)	Romance Medicine	1962	serialized in Nakayoshi
Yamabiko Shimai (山びこ姉妹)		1964	serialized in Niji
Nemuri Shōjo (ねむり少女)		1964	published by Tōkyō Mangasha
Hebi Obasan (へびおばさん)		1964	
Mama ga Kowai (ママがこわい)	Scared of Mama	1965	serialized in Shōjo Friend
Madara no Shōjo (まだらの少女)	The Spotted Girl	1965	serialized in Shōjo Friend
Benigumo (紅グモ)	Red Spider	1965–1966	serialized in Shōjo Friend
Hangyojin (半魚人)	Half-Fish Man	1965	serialized in Shōnen Magazine
Hibiware Ningen (ひびわれ人間)	Cracked Human	1966	serialized in Shōnen Magazine
Hebi Shōjo (へび少女)	Reptilia	1966	serialized in Shōjo Friend
Urutoraman (ウルトラマン)	Ultraman	1966–1967	serialized in Shōnen Magazine
Nekome no Shōjo (ねこ目の少女)	Cat Eyed Girl	1967	serialized in Shōjo Friend
Nekome Kozō (猫目小僧)	Cat Eyed Boy	1967–1968; 1968–1969; 1976	serialized in Shōnen Gaho serialized in Shōnen King serialized in Weekly Shōnen Sunday
Akanbo Shōjo (赤んぼ少女)	Baby Girl	1967	serialized in Shōjo Friend
Shisha no Kōshin (死者の行進)	March of the Dead	1967	serialized in Shōnen Magazine
SF Ishoku Tampenshū (SF異色短編集)		1968–1969	serialized in Big Comic
Kage (映像)		1968	serialized in Teen Look
Chō no Haka (蝶の墓)	Butterfly Grave	1968	serialized in Teen Look
Osore (おそれ)	Fear	1969	
Orochi (おろち)	Orochi	1969–1970	serialized in Weekly Shōnen Sunday
Iara (イアラ)		1970	serialized in Big Comic
Kaijū Gyō (怪獣ギョー)		1971	serialized in Teen Look
Agein (アゲイン)	Again	1971–1972	serialized in Weekly Shōnen Sunday
Hyōryū Kyōshitsu (漂流教室)	The Drifting Classroom	1972–1974	serialized in Weekly Shōnen Sunday
Senrei (洗礼)	Baptism	1974–1976	serialized in Shōjo Comic
Makoto-chan (まことちゃん)	Makoto-chan	1976–1981	serialized in Weekly Shōnen Sunday
Watashi wa Shingo (わたしは真悟)	My Name Is Shingo	1982–1986	serialized in Big Comic Spirits
Kami no Hidarite Akuma no Migite (神の左手悪魔の右手)	God's Left Hand, Devil's Right Hand	1986–1988	serialized in Big Comic Spirits
Chō! Makoto-chan (超!まことちゃん)		1988–1989	serialized in Weekly Shōnen Sunday
Fōtīn (14歳)	Fourteen	1990–1995	serialized in Big Comic Spirits

=== Paintings ===
- Zoku-Shingo: Little Robot Shingo (Zoku-Shingo小さなロボット シンゴ美術館, Zoku-Shingo Chiisa na Robotto Shingo Bijutsukan)
- Cave Queen Java (Java洞窟の女王, Jawa Dōkutsu no Joō)

=== Films ===
- Nekome Kozo (anime television series)
- Drifting Classroom (movie)
- Blood Baptism (movie)
- Drifting School (movie)
- Long Love Letter: Drifting Classroom (TV drama)
- Kazuo Umezu's Horror Theater (6-part TV anthology)
- The Snake Girl and the Silver-Haired Witch ("Hebimusume to hakuhatsuma", 蛇娘と白髪魔) (1968) (Daiei/Kadokawa Pictures)
- Tamami: The Baby's Curse (film)
- Mother (film) (director)

=== Albums ===
- Yami no Album (闇のアルバム, 1975)
- Yami no Album 2 (闇のアルバム・2, 2011)

=== Video games ===
- Umezma (ウメズマ, 1996)

=== Musicals ===
In 2016, his manga My Name Is Shingo was adapted into a musical. It stars Mitsuki Takahata and Mugi Kadowaki as the lead characters and is directed and choreographed by Philippe Decouflé.
