= Nicole Claveloux =

French painter, illustrator and comic book artist (born 1940)

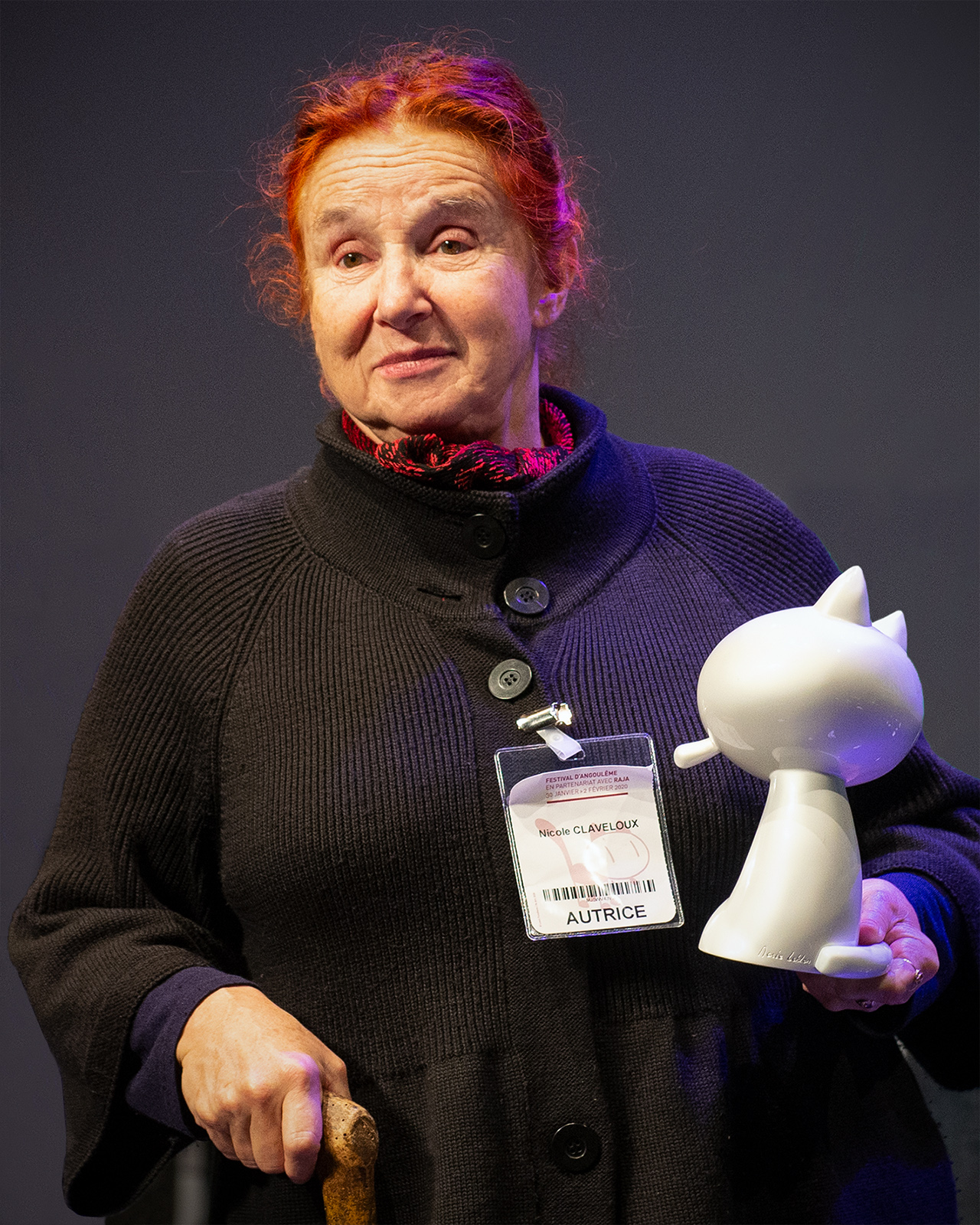
- Claveloux at the Angoulême Festival 2020
- Born: 23 June 1940 (age 85); Saint-Étienne, France
- Known for: Painting, illustration, comics

Nicole Claveloux (French: [klav(ə)lu]; born 23 June 1940) is a French painter, illustrator and comic book artist.

== Biography ==
Nicole Claveloux was born in Saint-Étienne, France, and studied fine arts there. She moved to Paris in 1966, where she worked as an illustrator and comics artist for various magazines, including Planète, Okapi and Marie Claire.

Her illustration style incorporates both psychedelic use of colour and sophisticated black-and-white images.

Her work was included in several exhibitions, including Nicole Claveloux et compagnie at Villeurbanne in 1995 and a retrospective at the Mediatheque Hermeland at Saint-Herblain.

== Selected works ==
- Le Voyage extravagant de Hugo Brisefer (1967)
- Alala: Les télémorphoses (1970), illustrator. Published by Harlin Quist in English as The Teletrips of Alala
- Les Aventures d'Alice au pays des merveilles (1972), illustrator
- La Main verte (1978), comic book featuring a series of short stories from Métal Hurlant. Published in English in 2017 as The Green Hand
- Double assassinat dans la rue Morgue (1981), illustrator
- Dedans les gens (1993), received the Prix Totem Album at the Salon du livre et de la presse jeunesse in Montreuil
- Alboum (1998), illustrator, text by Christian Bruel received the Prix Sorcières
- Morceaux choisis de la Belle et la Bête, erotic book (2003), illustrator
- Mon Gugus à moi (2004), illustrator, received the Prix Cécile-Gagnon
- Un roi, une princesse et une pieuvre (2005), illustrator, received the Prix Goncourt Jeunesse
- Professeur Totem et docteur Tabou (2006), illustrator
- Gargantua (2007), illustrator
- Confessions d'un monte-en-l'air, erotic book (2007), illustrator
- Contes de la Fève et du Gland, erotic book (2010), illustrator
- La Belle et la bête, children's book (2013), illustrator
- Nours, children's book (2014), illustrator
- Quel genre de bisous ?, children's book (2016)
- The Green Hand and Other Stories (2017), with Édith Zha, translated into English by Donald Nicholson-Smith
