= The Drifting Classroom =

Japanese manga series

- Manga volume 1 cover

漂流教室 (Hyōryū Kyōshitsu)
- Genre: Horror; Science fiction; Supernatural
- Manga
- Written by: Kazuo Umezu
- Published by: Shogakukan
- English publisher: NA: Viz Media
- Imprint: Shōnen Sunday Comics
- Magazine: Weekly Shōnen Sunday
- Original run: 1972 – 1974
- Volumes: 11
- Live-action film
- Directed by: Nobuhiko Obayashi
- Studio: Bandai Entertainment
- Released: July 11, 1987
- Runtime: 104 minutes
- Television drama

The Long Love Letter
- Studio: Fuji TV
- Original run: January 9, 2002 – March 20, 2002

The Drifting Classroom (漂流教室, Hyōryū Kyōshitsu) is a Japanese horror manga series written and illustrated by Kazuo Umezu. It was serialized in the manga magazine Weekly Shōnen Sunday from 1972 to 1974, and published as collected tankōbon volumes by Shogakukan. The series follows a school that is mysteriously transported through time to a post-apocalyptic future.

In 1987, The Drifting Classroom was adapted into a live-action film directed by Nobuhiko Obayashi. An American adaptation, Drifting School, was produced in 1995. The Long Love Letter, a Japanese television drama loosely based on The Drifting Classroom, was released in 2002.

The series was critically acclaimed, and won a Shogakukan Manga Award in 1974.

== Plot ==
Sixth grader Sho Takamatsu travels to school after a bitter argument with his mother Emiko. Meanwhile, a burglar breaks into the school to steal money. While in class, a tremor shakes the facility, and the school is transported to an otherworldly wasteland. Yu, a three-year-old boy who was caught in the tremor, shows Sho a memorial buried in the dust commemorating the disappearance of their school. It transpires that the school has traveled through time to a post-apocalyptic future ravaged by environmental disasters.

As the hopelessness of their situation becomes clear, most of the adults descend into insanity. Delivery man Sekiya hoards the school's food and immolates the teachers who attempt to stop him, but is then subdued by Sho's class. Meanwhile, teacher Wakahara murders his colleagues and several students before being killed by Sho in self-defense. With all adults except Sekiya dead, Sho and his companions attempt to lead the children as a quasi-government. Nishi, a telepathic student who is able to communicate with individuals in the past, is able to contact Emiko, who prepares objects in her own time to assist the children in their future.

The stranded children face many threats in their fight for survival, including hostile megafauna, a deadly plague, food and water shortages, delinquents who sow dissension, and creeping madness, as well as sadistic schemings by Sekiya, whose mental faculties gradually deteriorate.

Eventually, the remaining semi-feral children come back to their senses after Otomo, a high-achieving student who is jealous of Sho, admits that he had planted dynamite in the school the night before the tremor, which had probably caused their temporal displacement, and apologizes for his behavior. The burglar who was caught in the explosion survived, but fragments of his body, including his arm and much of his brain, were displaced in time along with the school, remaining alive and telepathically connected to the burglar.

Nishi ultimately falls into a coma, though the children are able to use her powers one final time to send Yu back into the past. Sekiya appears one last time intent on spoiling the children's plan, but the burglar's displaced arm kills him. Yu promises that he will try to avert the events that have led to their post-apocalyptic future, and delivers Sho's journal to Emiko upon returning to the present. Emiko then dedicates her future to building an artificial satellite that will orbit the Earth with supplies necessary to start a settlement. Just as Yu is sent back to his time, Emiko's satellite lands back on the barren Earth, providing Sho and the remaining children resources needed to survive. The children remaining in the future vow to rebuild the world from the ashes of the past.

== Characters ==
=== Main characters ===
Sho Takamatsu
The main character of the story. Sho is noble and brave, and rather selfless. He consistently refuses to sacrifice anyone for the good of the rest. Even though he started the story by fighting with his mother, he loves her a lot and thanks to Nishi's telepathic powers is even able to contact her. He is good friends with Ikegaki and Otomo, and later becomes good friends with Sakiko, Gamo, and the other officials.
Nishi Ayumi
A fair-haired girl with a crippled leg, a fifth-grader from Nagano and Sho's love interest. She is a latent psychic who is capable of telepathically linking the past and the present, a gift which becomes crucial for the stranded children – especially Sho and his desperate mother – at times and which may also be one of the causes which got the school time-stranded. However, she is very insecure, believing she brings bad fortune to everyone around her. In the end she falls comatose when Sho is operated on his appendix and his pain links his mind to his mother through her power, but the children are still able to tap into her power, sending at least one of them back. It is uncertain (though not unlikely) if she survived her ordeal.
Sakiko Kawada
A friend of Sho, on whom she has a secret crush. She is a sixth grader from class 3 and she has a brother, Takeshi, in the third grade who dies from an illness shortly after their arrival in the future. When everyone else doubts Sho, she sticks up for him. After the Nation of Yamato Elementary is formed, she seems to be a cook or a server when it is meal time. She is brave, but jealous of Sho's attention to Nishi. Sho eventually tells Sakiko that, even if she comes to hate him over his close relationship with Nishi, he still cares about her deeply.
Otomo
A sixth grader who is in class 3. He is also very brave and athletic, and extremely pragmatic. However, he has a dark side: he was the one who tried blowing up the school when the stress of being given too much burden as a student and class representative got him - a deed which combined with other incidental factors into getting the school marooned in the future. Worried about being found out, he opposes Sho at every turn and eventually leads an armed revolt against him. Despite this, he still has honor through most of the novel; he helps Yuichi make the chasm jump, and also tells Sho to chase Sekiya (who is fleeing with the food) rather than help him and Sakiko face the monsters. At the very end, he admits to his sins and helps reunite the school.
Emiko Takamatsu
Sho's mother, who is left behind in the present/past. Remorseful over the argument she had with Sho on the morning of his disappearance, she desperately renders any help she can give him when Nishi's power enables them to contact each other across the time rift. She is eventually deified by the older children in order to keep morale up amongst the younger students.
Yu (Yuichi)
A three-year-old boy who along with the school in the time shift when he was playing nearby, waiting for Sho. The only child who manages to return to the present, he delivers a journal recording the events and misadventures the children had in the future to Sho's mother, and promises to try to reverse their bleak future.

=== Schoolmates: Sho's Class ===
Ikegaki
Extremely brave and hot-headed, he was one of the students who wanted to kill Sekiya after his first attack. He stops Sekiya from leaving Sho to be eaten by the monster, and he leads a defense force against a monster attacking the school, buying Sho time to save the other children. Though stripped of one hand, he still fights on until he dies.
Hata
A jokester who has a hard time taking any tell-tale news seriously. Sekiya stabbed and killed him when he tried rescuing Aikawa, Sekiya's hostage.
Okubo
A boy who participates in the attempted liberation of Aikawa, and is accidentally shot by Hata when the latter is stabbed by Sekiya.
Yoshida
A nice boy, but very clueless. He intrudes on Hashimoto's sick bed to inform the government officials that peaches are growing. Otomo gets mad at him when this turns out to just be peach flowers. He freaks out when told that he must leave the school due to being a plague risk, and needs to be restrained. He escapes Sho and runs towards Scar Kid's mob, and is killed.
Yanase
He is a son of a doctor and also wants to be one when he grows up. He's one of the first people to return to Sho's side after Sho returns. He helps in examining what is wrong with Hashimoto and discovers that Hashimoto has the black plague. He is very knowledgeable about medicine, and although full of hesitation at the first time, he is able to perform surgery later.
Yoshikawa
A girl who wants to be a singer. After eating strange mushrooms, she proceeds to mutate and create the One-Eyed cult, which creates a temporary schism in the school. Her cult eventually collapses after her subordinates actually see the "One-Eyed God" (one of the mutants; see below). She is stopped from fleeing with the rest of the cult by her friend Koyami, but when the monsters come to the school, she leaves with them. She later helps Sho and his friends escape from the monsters when in the subway tunnels, and is presumably killed by the mutants for her betrayal.
Mari
A girl who suffers from achluophobia. She becomes infected with the black plague, but is cured. It is unknown if she survives the end of the series.
Kyoko Aikawa
A girl who is held hostage by Sekiya when he tries to seize the school's food supply for himself, but is rescued. She survives the plague and later joins Sho's side when Otomo leads his rebellion against his friend. It is unknown if she survives the end of the series.
Yamamoto
A sixth grade girl who, right after the school is time-stranded, attempts to climb the safety fence of the school roof, tearfully looking for her mother, only to fall off and thus becomes the first casualty in the school.
Shinichi Yamada
A classmate and friend of Sho, and the only student of the school who remains in the present because he had returned home to fetch his forgotten lunch money on the morning the school disappeared. Although he does not appear to grasp the situation as well as Sho's mother does, he assists her in remorse over Sho's disappearance, believing that if he had convinced Sho to wait for him, he would still be in the present.

=== Schoolmates: Other 6th Graders ===
Otsuki
A practical jokester with suspenders and an annoying sense of humor. One of the government officials, and he seems to be in charge of the census. He is appointed to his position by Sho. He is instrumental in using the mummy to frighten away Scar Kid's mob. He joins Otomo's side in forcing Sekiya to eat the mushrooms, but Sekiya tricks them all and eventually forces Otsuki to eat the mushrooms. Otsuki proceeds to run off into the desert and mutate into one of the future humans. He helps protect Sho and his friends when the mutants catch them, and is presumably killed later.
Ishida
A quiet kid who runs the garden. One of the governmental officials. He says little, but takes Otomo's side in disagreements with Sho. When escaping the mutant tunnels, a volcano eruption bursts his eardrums, and then Otomo pushes a billboard on top of him, killing him.
Shibata
A kid with a black shirt. Easily excited. More loyal to Sho than Otsuki and Ishida. He is the construction minister. He is decapitated fighting the monsters after escaping the tunnels.
Akabane
A cowardly boy, he is among the students taken by Sekiya to see the insect. Akabane and Tashiro beat up Otomo rather than fight the monster to buy Yu time, then he lies and says that Sho was a coward. He sides with Princess in the election, but once Sho wins, he apologizes. It is unknown if he survives.
Tashiro
He goes with Sho and everyone to find the forest in the desert. After being attacked by the insect monster, he, Otomo, and Akabane escape. Akabane and he beats up Otomo after he suggests they stay and fight the monster instead of escaping. At the last moment, he has a change of heart, and attacks the beast head on, and is eaten by the monster.
Nagata
While Sho, he, and a few other classmates are out searching for supplies, they are all attacked by Tashimi Yakuto. He manages to escape Mr. Wakahara's car and eventually finds a jungle. He makes his way back to the school, but collapses dead right after reaching it when the jungle plants he ate turn into sand inside his body.
Tatsumi
The school bully. When a rumor is spread about a person whose name begins with 'Ta' is said to be the cause of why they are stuck in the wasteland, he is captured by the lower grades and is nearly burned alive. Sho manages to save him, but it is unknown if he survives the series.
Ando
One of the five people who went with Mr. Wakahara to search for food. Sho managed to pull off a plastic bag wrapped around his head and he points out Mr. Wakahara as the attacker. He is the second to be struck down and killed by Wakahara when he attacks the group with his car.
Seino
One of the five people who went with Mr. Wakahara to search for food. He was the first to be killed by Wakahara using his car.
Uemura
He is devoured alive by the insect swarm when he investigates his classroom after people heard the strange sound coming from his class. Relatively brave.
Hatsuta
Goofy and weird, he almost breaks his teeth biting a can of pineapples. It is never stated that he dies, but he is not shown in the final volume's 'wishing circle' and so presumably perished somewhere along the way.
Murata
A non-athletic student who drowned in quicksand during a flood.

=== Schoolmates: 5th Graders ===
Nakata
A very good friend of Nishi. Frail and weak, but a loyal friend and, just like Nishi, a latent psychic. When he is hungry, he summons insect monsters with his mind. At first unbelieving, he eventually commits suicide to stop the monsters from eating Nishi.
Gamo
He is the smartest student in the whole school with an IQ of 230. He has a natural aptitude for science and often helps with explanation, such as telling the student body about their time travelling. He is incredibly loyal to Sho, casting the deciding vote for him during the elections and risking the plague to stay with him in the desert. He survives the series.

=== Faculty ===
Mr. Wakahara
Sho's sixth grade teacher. At first Wakahara appears as a stout-minded and dependable father figure, but after seeing Sakura commit suicide, he suffers a mental breakdown that causes him to go insane and murder all the teachers and several students. His murder spree is interrupted by Sho, who stabs him with a knife left behind in the ruins of the Keiyo Hotel by his mother; Wakahara then falls to his death.
Mr. Sakura
A teacher who is prone to hysterics. When he realizes that he is stranded in a desolate future, he commits suicide by cutting open his jugular vein.
Principal
The school's principal. Right before everyone was transported to the future, he was attacked by a burglar who stole the teachers' pay. Clueless and rather dumb. He was killed by Wakahara.
Ms. Tanimura
A teacher for the school who suffered from seizures. She was killed by Wakahara.
Mr. Arakawa
A teacher for the school. When all the older students try to rush out into the wasteland after discovery what happened to them, he breaks his glasses and stabs his son in the arm to calm everyone down. He was killed by Wakahara.
Mr. Asai
A teacher for the school. Before the school vanished, he was listening to his handheld radio in the teacher's lounge. He was killed by Wakahara.

=== Villains ===
Kyusaku Sekiya
A 38-year-old school lunch delivery man. Originally an unassuming and mild-mannered man, he becomes a selfish and vicious tyrant when he finds himself stranded in the future. He refers to children as beasts and resources to be exploited, and routinely kills or threatens them in order to fulfill his own desires. In the end, he attempts to kill Yu to be teleported home in his stead, but Basai's arm strangles him.
"Princess"
She is a leader of a girl gang and attempts to take over the school. A violent and cruel bully who advocates capital punishment for stealing food. She takes over because she believes all that Sho does just gets them into more trouble. Her friends who help her in tyranny over the school are Tomeko and Hatsuko. She leaves the school in a huff after losing the election. Totally emaciated and more dead than alive, she comes back to the school much later to tell the students that there's a 'paradise' in Mount Fuji before dying.
Hatsuko
She is one of the Princess's friends/gang members. She doesn't talk much and obeys the Princess without question. Her hair is cut a bit short and she wears a short dress. After the Prime Minister election, The Princess lost and she with a few other followers left the school to go into the desert. After this event, her fate remains unknown.
Tomeko
She is one of the Princess's friends/gang members. She doesn't talk much and obeys "The Princess" without question. She is a bit of a masculine build and has ponytails. She left with the rest of the gang after the election, and after that her fate remains unknown.
"Scar Kid"
A rather selfish kid who leads the pogrom that burns Hashimoto to death. He kills Yoshida and almost burns up half of the remaining students in order to remove the plague and to increase the food supply available for himself. Once he learns that he is himself infected, he decides to kill everyone, but eventually succumbs to the deadly sickness.
Future Humans
A band of monstrous creatures descended from humans, implied to be an evolutionary leap triggered by the human population becoming too large. They are intelligent and capable of human speech; their bodies, however, are spider-like with four spindly legs and a single large eye on their back, and they are capable of spitting sticky strands to immobilize their opponents. Their society is a hivemind; individualism is punishable by death. They also share a collective loathing for pre-collapse humans, whose blind hedonism and greed are thought to be responsible for the end of civilization. Initially they are hostile to humans, but after Sho manages to appeal them through their common ancestry, they stop the attack. Later they appear again when some starfish monsters attack the school, but shortly afterwards a giant worm consumes them all.
Basai
One of two thieves that robbed the school and beat up the principal before the explosion of Otomo's dynamite. His partner is killed in the blast, and Basai's arm and half of his face are subsequently teleported into the future along with the school, though he can still see through his missing eye and use his missing hand as if it were still attached. He remains off-screen for the vast majority of the adventure, until the very end. When Sekiya attempts to kill Yuichi, Basai wills his body parts to jump out and strangle him. The body parts then return with Yu and are reunited with his body.

== Reception and legacy ==
The Drifting Classroom won the 20th Shogakukan Manga Award in 1974.

Dash Shaw has cited the manga as an influence on his film My Entire High School Sinking into the Sea.

== Adaptations ==
- Hyōryū Kyōshitsu (1987)
- Drifting School (1995)
- The Long Love Letter (2002)

== See also ==
- Fourteen—an indirect sequel to The Drifting Classroom
- The Woods, an American comic series with a similar premise.
