= Mothra =

Fictional monster, or kaiju

- Mothra and Godzilla character
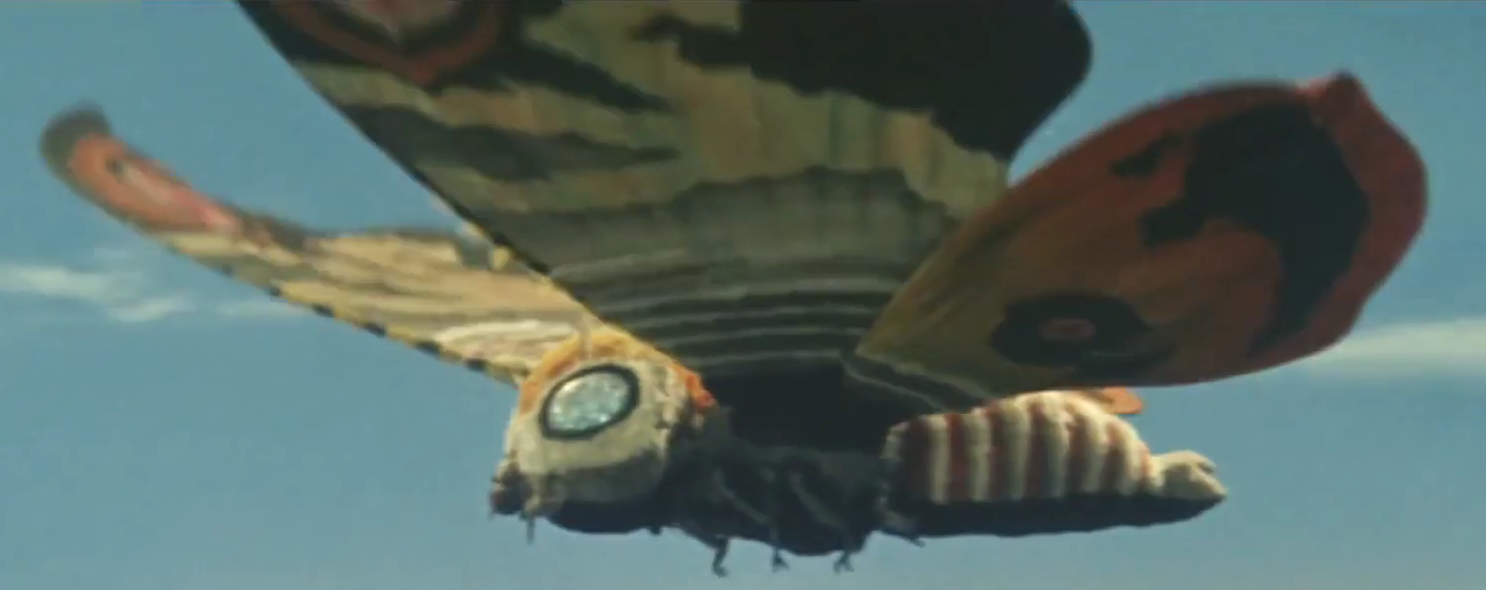
- Mothra, as featured in Mothra (1961)
- First appearance: The Luminous Fairies and Mothra (1961 novella)
- Created by: Shinichiro Nakamura; Yoshie Hotta; Takehiko Fukanaga; Shinichi Sekizawa; Eiji Tsuburaya
- Portrayed by: Haruo Nakajima (caterpillar); Katsumi Tezuka (caterpillar)

In-universe information
- Aliases: The Thing (Note: American version of Mothra vs. Godzilla.); Titanus Mosura; Queen of the Monsters
- Species: Divine moth
- Gender: Female

Mothra (Japanese: モスラ, Hepburn: Mosura) is a moth-like giant monster, or kaiju, who first appeared in the 1961 film of the same name, directed by Ishirō Honda, and its novelization released earlier that year, The Luminous Fairies and Mothra, written by Takehiko Fukunaga, Shin'ichirō Nakamura and Yoshie Hotta. Mothra has appeared in several tokusatsu films, often as a recurring monster in the Godzilla franchise. She is typically portrayed as a colossal moth, who hatches from her egg in her larval caterpillar form, before cocooning herself with silk to become a winged adult (imago) form accompanied by two miniature humanoid twin fairies speaking on her behalf. Unlike several other Toho monsters, Mothra is a largely heroic character, having been variously portrayed as a protector of her own island culture, the Earth and Japan. Mothra's design is influenced by silkworms, their imagos, and those of giant silk moths in the family Saturniidae. The character is often depicted hatching offspring (in some cases, twins) when approaching death, a nod to the Saṃsāra doctrine of numerous Indian religions.

Outside of the Godzilla series, Mothra was the central figure of a trilogy of films starting with Rebirth of Mothra (1996). Mothra also appears in American studio Legendary Pictures' Monsterverse series, alongside other Toho monsters like Godzilla, Rodan, and King Ghidorah in the films, Godzilla: King of the Monsters (2019) and Godzilla x Kong: The New Empire (2024).

Though Mothra is generally portrayed as female, male individuals of her species have also been featured in the franchise, including Battra in Godzilla vs. Mothra (1992), the offspring in the Rebirth of Mothra film trilogy, referred to as Mothra Leo by song in the film, and a male Mothra larva who appears alongside his non-identical twin sister in Godzilla: Tokyo S.O.S. (2003).

Mothra is one of Toho's most popular monsters and second only to Godzilla in her total number of film appearances. Polls taken during the early 1990s indicated that Mothra was particularly popular among women who were, at the time, the largest demographic among Japan's movie-going audience, a fact that prompted the filming of 1992's Godzilla vs. Mothra, which was the best-attended Toho film since King Kong vs. Godzilla (1962). IGN listed Mothra as #3 on its "Top 10 Japanese Movie Monsters" list, while Complex listed the character as #7 on its "The 15 Most Badass Kaiju Monsters of All Time" list.

== Overview ==
=== Name ===
The name Mothra (モスラ) is the suffixation of "-ra" to the English word "moth"; since the Japanese language does not have dental fricatives, it is approximated "Mosura" in Japanese. The "ra" suffix follows the precedent set by Godzilla (Gojira), which in turn is derived from kujira (鯨, "whale"), which serves to indicate the character's enormous size.

Dican International Pictures entitled the movie Godzilla vs. the Thing, probably to avoid legal action from Columbia Pictures, which had released the original Mothra.

=== Development ===
Mothra debuted in the January 1961 serial The Luminous Fairies and Mothra by authors Shin'ichirō Nakamura, Takehiko Fukunaga and Yoshie Hotta, who had been commissioned by Toho to write the outline of a future film. The character was further developed by Shinichi Sekizawa, whose experiences of starving in the South Pacific islands during World War II prompted him to envision a movie featuring an island where mysterious events occurred.

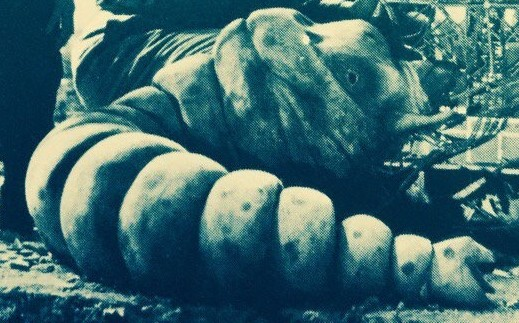
A behind the scenes image of Mothra (1961), featuring Mothra in her larval caterpillar form

In her first film appearance in the 1961 film Mothra, Mothra's adult form consisted of a wire-operated mechanical puppet, while the larva was a suitmation puppet operated by six stuntmen crawling in single file. In Mothra vs. Godzilla three years later, the adult Mothra puppet was modified with radio-controlled legs, while the larvae were portrayed via a combination of motor-driven props and hand puppets. The larval Mothra featured in Ghidorah, the Three-Headed Monster remained largely unchanged from its previous appearance, though the color of its eyes was changed from blue to red. The adult Mothra prop featured in Mothra vs. Godzilla was reused in Ebirah, Horror of the Deep, though previous heavy use had dulled its colors, frayed the fur on the head and damaged the wings.

During the early Heisei era of Godzilla films, which ignored the continuity established in pre-1984 movies, several attempts were made to develop a Mothra standalone feature. Akira Murao wrote a screenplay in 1990 entitled Mothra vs. Bagan, which revolved around a shape-shifting dragon called Bagan who sought to destroy humanity for its abuse of the Earth's resources, only to be defeated by Mothra, the god of peace. The screenplay was revised by Kazuki Ōmori after the release of Godzilla vs. Biollante, though the project was ultimately scrapped by Toho, due to the poor box office performance of Godzilla vs. Biollante, as well as the assumption that Mothra was a character born purely out of Japanese culture and thus would have been difficult to market overseas, unlike the more internationally recognized Godzilla. With the success of Godzilla vs. King Ghidorah, Toho sought to continue the series' newfound profitability by reintroducing familiar monsters rather than inventing new ones. Mothra was chosen as Godzilla's next antagonist on account of the character's popularity with women, who constituted the majority of cinemagoers at the time. Special effects head Koichi Kawakita co-wrote a screenplay entitled Godzilla vs. Gigamoth in 1991, which would have pitted Mothra against Godzilla and an irradiated Mothra doppelganger called Gigamoth, though this was rejected early on and replaced with the final plotline that was seen in the film Godzilla vs. Mothra. Kawakita's depiction of Mothra's adult form was given the ability to fire energy beams, which were rendered via optical effects, and the pollen dust emitted from its wings were given a sparkling effect not seen in prior movies. During the character's transformation from larva to adult, it was initially planned to have Mothra's unfolding wings rendered through CGI, though this was scrapped on account of it not looking "sensitive" enough. Although the movie was a financial success, the Mothra props were criticized by several authors, who noted that the adult Mothra's brighter colors made it look like a "plush toy" and that its wings flapped less gracefully than in previous incarnations, as they were made of heavy cloth. The Mothra puppet's immobile chicken-like feet and the lack of undulation in the larva prop's movements were also commented on as being inferior to the effects seen in 1960s Mothra movies. Criticism was also leveled at Mothra's altered origin story, which portrayed her as an extraterrestrial, thus dampening the character's motivation for protecting Earth. The character's newfound popularity nevertheless prompted Toho to produce Rebirth of Mothra in 1996.

For Godzilla, Mothra and King Ghidorah: Giant Monsters All-Out Attack, director Shūsuke Kaneko had originally planned on using Anguirus as one of Godzilla's antagonists, but was pressured by Toho chairman Isao Matsuoka to use the more recognizable and profitable Mothra, as the previous film in the franchise, Godzilla vs. Megaguirus, which featured an original and unfamiliar antagonist, was a box office and critical failure.

For 2003's Godzilla: Tokyo S.O.S., special effects director Eiichi Asada sought to model Mothra directly on her appearance in the original 1961 film and to keep optical effects to a minimum. As with Godzilla, Mothra and King Ghidorah, the adult Mothra was given mobile legs, though they were made to constantly move, as it was felt that the prop stopped looking realistic once they became immobile. Creature designer Shinichi Wakasa had initially wanted Mothra's wings to have the angular design seen in Rebirth of Mothra II, though the prop was ultimately given the wing shape seen in the 1960s movies. In addition, Mothra's twin larvae, one male and one female, were given nicknames by the staff on set - the male, who can be distinguished by his longer tusks and spikes, was nicknamed Taro, while the female was nicknamed Hanako.

=== Mothra's fairies ===
Shobijin
- Mothra and Godzilla characters
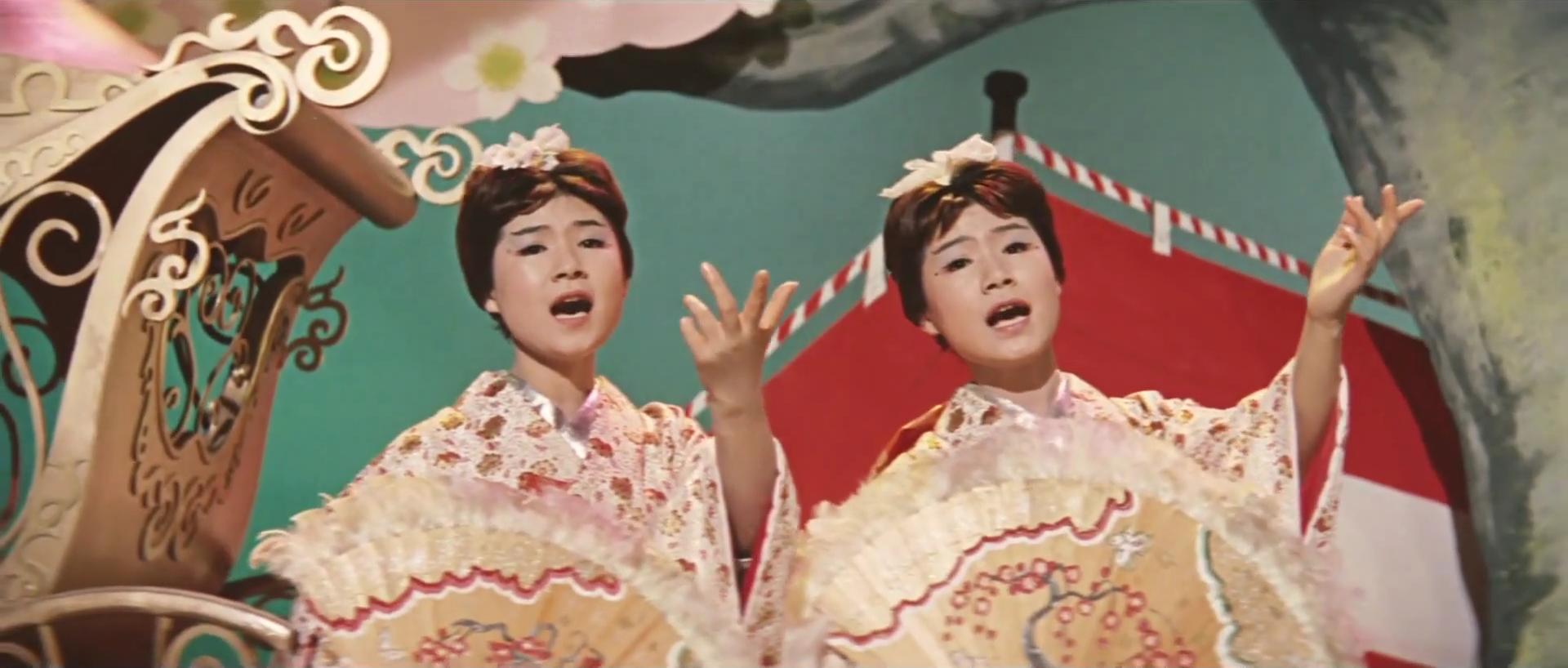
- the Shobijin as portrayed by the Peanuts in Mothra (1961)
- First appearance: The Luminous Fairies and Mothra (1961)
- Last appearance: Chibi Godzilla Raids Again (2023)
- Created by: Tomoyuki Tanaka; Shinichiro Nakamura; Yoshie Hotta; Takehiko Fukanaga
- Portrayed by: Emi Itō and Yumi Itō; Yuko Okada and Yoko Okada; Keiko Imamura and Sayaka Osawa; Megumi Kobayashi and Sayaka Yamaguchi/Misato Tate; Masami Nagasawa and Chihiro Otsuka; Zhang Ziyi
- Voiced by: Reina Ueda and Akari Kitō

In-universe information
- Aliases: Cosmos; Elias
- Species: Twin fairies
- Home: Birth Island

Mothra is usually accompanied by tiny twin female fairies, which Shinichi Sekizawa termed Shobijin (小美人), meaning "little beauties". The original draft for Mothra called for four fairies, though Sekizawa reduced the number to two, as twins were comparatively rare in Japan, thus adding to the characters' mystique. Toho also sought to reinforce its links with Columbia Pictures, by featuring the singing duo the Peanuts, who had been popularized in America by Columbia Records. Yūji Koseki composed the song Mosura no uta ("Song of Mothra") for the fairies to sing when summoning Mothra. The song was originally sung in Indonesian, but there is also a later version, set to the same tune, sung in Japanese:

Mothra's Song
Malay/Indonesian	Translation	Japanese	Translation
Mosura ya Mosura	Mothra oh Mothra	Mosura ya Mosura	Mothra oh Mothra
Dengan kesaktian indukmu	with the power of your ancestor	Tasukete yo to yobeba	if we were to call for help
Restuilah doa hamba hamba mu yang rendah bangunlah dan	grant the prayer of your lowly servants, arise and	Toki o koete, umi o koete, nami no yō ni	over time, over sea, like a wave
tunjukkanlah	show	Yatte kuru	you'd come,
kesaktianmu	your power!	Mamorigami!	our guardian angel!

The Peanuts were given an additional song in Ghidorah, the Three-Headed Monster entitled "Cry for Happiness", composed by Hiroshi Miyagawa. The Peanuts did not reprise their role in Ebirah, Horror of the Deep and were replaced by the singing duo Pair Bambi.

In Godzilla vs. Mothra, the fairies are renamed the Cosmos (コスモス, Kosumosu) and are played by Keiko Imamura and Sayaka Osawa. This casting move was criticized by Godzilla historian Steve Ryfle, who lamented the fact that the two actresses were not identical and that their singing voices were "paper thin." According to Takao Okawara, the Cosmos scenes were among the hardest scenes he had ever filmed, as the actresses had to synchronize their movements without looking at each other.

In the Rebirth of Mothra trilogy, Mothra's fairies are called the Elias (エリアス, Eriasu) which consist of Moll, Lora, and their estranged sister Belvera. Moll and Lora contrast with prior adaptations because they possess separate personalities and rarely act in unison. Megumi Kobayashi was cast as Moll for all three films, Sayaka Yamaguchi as Lora for the first two films, Misato Tate as Lora for the third film and Aki Hano as Belvera for all three films.

Godzilla, Mothra and King Ghidorah: Giant Monsters All-Out Attack does not feature Mothra's fairies, but they are however given a nod in the form of a pair of twin girls wearing white clothes during the scene where Mothra flies over Tokyo. They are played by sisters Ai and Aki Maeda.

In the anime trilogy directed by Gen Urobuchi, the fairies are human-sized sisters named Maina and Miana. Their people are the Houtua (フツア, Futsua), descendants of humans that evolved through Mothra's influence with both telepathy and an immunity to the assimilative properties of nanometal.

In Godzilla: King of the Monsters, it's revealed that Monarch researcher Dr. Ilene Chen (played by Zhang Ziyi) has an identical twin sister named Dr. Ling Chen, who is also in Monarch and is present at Mothra's hatching. The Chens are part of a family which appears to consist almost entirely of pairs of identical twin sisters, two of whom are shown visiting Infant Island (Mothra's traditional home) in 1961. The film's director and co-screenwriter, Michael Dougherty, confirmed the twins to be an updated version of the fairies, explaining, "It was important to me to find ways to modernize the ideas that [Mothra] has followers. Modernize the priestesses. [There] are still certain realms of believability to keep in take. You have to ease people into the more fantastical aspects." He noted that the twins were a "perfect example" of humans and monsters cooperating and forming a "symbiotic relationship with each other", saying, “The twins are an example of a very successful, long relationship...so I wanted to make sure that we found some way to incorporate them, even if it was a little bit of an Easter egg.” Dougherty, who is half-Vietnamese, felt the need to retain the twins' Asian ethnicity.

== Film history ==
=== Shōwa era (1961–1968) ===
In the Showa continuity, Mothra is depicted as a mystical being that is worshiped by a primitive human culture native to Infant Island. Mothra has her hatching from an egg after her priestesses are abducted by a Rolisican capitalist hoping to exploit them as media celebrities. The larva Mothra swims to Tokyo and cocoons herself around the Tokyo Tower. Upon reaching her adult form, Mothra flies to Rolisica's capital and causes widespread destruction until her priestesses are returned to her.

Mothra in this era, most notably the first individual appeared in the 1961 film is the largest incarnation of all, being 180 meters in length with a wingspan of 250 meters and weighed 20,000 tonnes as an Imago, and 135 meters in body length and weighed 15,000 tonnes as a larva. In later films, the size of the Imagoes decreased to 53 meters in 1964 film and 40 meters in body length and 8,000 tonnes in weight in 1968 film respectively, while the size of the larva in 1966 film stayed the same to the 1961 individual.

In Mothra vs. Godzilla, a Mothra egg appears on the coast of Japan, and is exploited as a tourist attraction. Mothra's priestesses attempt to negotiate the return of the egg to Infant Island, but are rebuffed. Godzilla attacks Japan, forcing humanity to beseech an embittered Mothra to intervene. Mothra willingly sacrificed herself whilst fighting Godzilla, but the latter is defeated when two larvae emerge from the egg and encase Godzilla in a cocoon.

In Ghidorah, the Three-Headed Monster, it is revealed that only one of the larvae survived. The remaining larva attempts to convince Godzilla and Rodan to join forces with her in order to fight King Ghidorah, but the two monsters reject her proposal. Mothra is nearly killed attempting to fight Ghidorah alone, but is saved through the intervention of Godzilla and Rodan.

The larva ultimately gains adulthood in Ebirah, Horror of the Deep, where she saves a group of slaves taken from Infant Island from a terrorist base on Letchi Island undergoing a self-destruct sequence.

Another larva appears in Destroy All Monsters, living alongside other monsters in Monsterland. Along with the other monsters, Mothra is briefly enslaved by the evil Kilaaks, who force her to attack Beijing and later join Godzilla in the destruction of Tokyo. The Kilaaks' mind control is ultimately broken and Mothra joins the other monsters in the final battle against King Ghidorah. This was the character's final starring role in the Showa era, although Mothra would later be seen in stock footage from Ghidorah, the Three-Headed Monster and Destroy All Monsters for Godzilla vs. Gigan in 1972.

=== Heisei era (1992–1998) ===
Mothra, as she appears in Godzilla vs. Mothra (1992).

1992's Godzilla vs. Mothra portrays Mothra as a guardian of the Earth who presided over an advanced civilization over 12,000 years ago. When the Cosmos' civilization created a device designed to control the Earth's climate, the Earth responded by creating the black ferocious male Mothra called Battra, which Mothra defeated and sealed in the Arctic Ocean, but not before the civilization was wiped out. Mothra's egg is later discovered in 1993 on Infant Island in Indonesia by the Marutomo company, which seeks to exploit it and the Cosmos for profit. Mothra's egg hatches during a battle between Godzilla and Battra in his larval form, and Mothra in her larval form later attacks Tokyo in order to save her priestesses. Mothra forms a cocoon around the National Diet Building, metamorphoses into her imago form, then briefly fights Battra at Yokohama before joining forces with him in order to fight Godzilla. Battra is killed by Godzilla in the attempt and Mothra pledges to fulfill her fallen comrade's role in preventing a meteorite from devastating the Earth in 1999.

In Godzilla vs. SpaceGodzilla (1994), Mothra detected SpaceGodzilla's advance towards Earth and sends the Cosmos to warn Miki Saegusa of his arrival on the planet.

==== Rebirth of Mothra trilogy ====
Mothra Leo
- Rebirth of Mothra trilogy character
- Mothra Leo, as depicted in Rebirth of Mothra (1996)
- First appearance: Rebirth of Mothra (1996)
- Last appearance: Godzilla Island (1998)

In-universe information
- Gender: Male
- Family: Mothra (mother)

The Rebirth of Mothra film trilogy is separate from the Godzilla Heisei continuity and portrays a new Mothra (retrospectively known as Mothra Leo) as the protagonist of the trilogy. Mothra Leo's mother, Mothra, was last remaining member of her species who guarded the Elias' civilization, which was destroyed millions of years ago by the extraterrestrial dragon, Desghidorah, whom Mothra defeated and sealed in her tomb.

In Rebirth of Mothra (1996), taking place in modern times, Mothra in her old age lays an egg of her child, but she is too old to fight Desghidorah once he breaks free. Mothra's offspring prematurely hatches from his egg and goes to protect his mother, but she is fatally wounded by Desghidorah while her offspring is still too weak in larval form to combat the foe. After Mothra drowns in the ocean, her offspring, taking his mother's name, metamorphoses into an imago form to avenge his mother's death and then manages to defeat and seal Desghidorah back to his tomb.

The new Mothra returns in Rebirth of Mothra II (1997), where he transforms into his new and more powerful form called Rainbow Mothra in order to battle the ancient creature Dagahra, awakened by environmental pollution in the modern times.

In Rebirth of Mothra III (1998), Mothra Leo is forced to travel back in time with the sacrifice of Moll to the Cretaceous period in order to retroactively kill and erase King Ghidorah from history. After seemingly killing Ghidorah's younger form in the Cretaceous period, the injured Mothra hibernates in a cocoon constructed by an prehistoric Mothra larvae for 65 million years until the modern times, where he destroys Ghidorah's far stronger modern form with his new, equally strong form called Armor Mothra and later reverts to his Eternal Mothra form in the end.

=== Millennium (2001–2004) ===
In Godzilla, Mothra and King Ghidorah: Giant Monsters All-Out Attack, Mothra is portrayed as having been one of the three guardians of Yamato, originating 1,000 years before the events of the film. Initially an antagonist, Mothra was imprisoned in Lake Ikeda, only to be reawakened in 2001 to halt Godzilla's destruction of Tokyo. She is defeated, but transfers her spirit to King Ghidorah.

Godzilla: Tokyo S.O.S. has a new Mothra, a decesdent from the one from the original 1961 film, sends her priestesses to demand that Japan dismantle the anti-Godzilla weapon Kiryu or face destruction, as she considers the cyborg to be against the natural order, having been created using the bones of the first Godzilla. When the second Godzilla lands, Mothra attempts to fight the monster alongside Kiryu, but is killed in the process. Two larvae hatch on Infant Island and reach Tokyo in order to fight Godzilla, whom they encase in a cocoon, which is then transported into the ocean by Kiryu.

Godzilla: Final Wars, which ignores the continuity of the previous film, establishes that Mothra protected the Earth 10,000 years ago from the cyborg Gigan. In the distant future, Gigan returns, under the control of the Xiliens, and is confronted by Mothra. In the ensuing battle, Mothra catches fire, but manages to kill Gigan by ramming into him and exploding. However, in a mid-credits scene, Mothra is shown to be alive after all and flying back to Infant Island to be reunited with the Shobijin.

=== Reiwa era (2018–2021) ===
While Mothra never made a physical appearance, she was mentioned in Godzilla: City on the Edge of Battle to have been killed by Godzilla years prior, though her egg ended up in the protection of the Houtua people, a species of evolved humans who adapted Mothra-like features to survive the now Godzilla ruled Earth. An astral projection of Mothra's unborn child in their adult form appears in Godzilla: The Planet Eater.

In Godzilla Singular Point, dozens of small moths, that bear a striking resemblance to Mothra, appear. (Visual similarities include: blue eyes, orange and yellow patterns on the wings, a 'false eye' pattern as seen on Mothra as well as other species of Lepidoptera). These small moths even seem to shed their golden scales, similar to how Mothra has done the same thing in the past. These moths also have a brief interaction with Jet Jaguar, making it the first on-screen interaction between the two Toho characters (outside of comics, video games, spin-offs, etc.).

However, due to this show's nature to rename / rebrand existing monsters as new ones (For example: A creature that heavily resembles “Varan”, both in its visual design & its sound design, is later revealed to be a different creature), there is no direct confirmation that this is actually Mothra. One may assume these moths are related to Mothra in some way (or actually are several Mothras), but the show does not provide any context as to what they actually are.

Several of Mothra's previous incarnations make cameo appearances in the show's ending credits (alongside several other Toho properties).

=== Monsterverse (2019–2024) ===
Mothra, as she appears in Godzilla X Kong: The New Empire (2024).

In 2014, Legendary Pictures announced that they had acquired the rights to Rodan, Mothra and King Ghidorah from Toho to use in their Monsterverse.

In the post-credits scene at the end of the 2017 film Kong: Skull Island, Mothra appears in a series of cave paintings depicting other monsters that are known to exist that are shown in the footage to James Conrad and Mason Weaver, along with Godzilla, Rodan and King Ghidorah.

A casting call confirmed that Rodan, Mothra, and King Ghidorah would all be featured in Godzilla: King of the Monsters. Viral marketing for the movie showed that Mothra retained her status as a creature who is deified as an angelic-like goddess, referred to as the Queen of the Monsters. Monarch Sciences, the film's promotional website, identifies the Yunnan rainforest as Mothra's location (however, Infant Island was referenced within the film, and the name "Mosura" is said to be derived from a small Indonesian island) and states in its adult form to be capable of emitting beta-wave bioluminescence that can be projected through the intricate patterns on its wings and weaponized into destructive and blinding ‘god rays’. Further promotional material also revealed narrower wings, a wider wingspan (at 803 feet or 244.75 meters, it is second only to her original 250-meter wingspan), long praying mantis-like forearms and legs as opposed to bird-like limbs and a body design that is more reminiscent of real-life moths, with a smaller body and head. The markings on her wings are said to mark her as the "Queen of the Monsters" and that they apparently link Mothra to Godzilla, the King of the Monsters, since the eye spots on her wings are modeled after Godzilla's eyes. Within the film, she is shown to have a symbiotic relationship with Godzilla, and temporarily paralyzes Rodan by stabbing him through the chest with a hidden abdominal stinger. These changes make Mothra the most heavily redesigned monster in the series.

Mothra first appears hatching from her egg in her larval state and is calmed by Dr. Emma Russell using the ORCA bio-acoustics device, becoming docile. When eco-terrorists led by Colonel Alan Jonah arrive soon after and capture Russell, her daughter Madison and the ORCA device, Mothra retreats under a waterfall and cocoons herself, later emerging from her cocoon in her adult form and flying off. During the fight in Boston, Mothra defeats Rodan and is disintegrated by King Ghidorah while protecting a fallen Godzilla. Her power is transferred to Godzilla as a result via her ashes, preventing him from suffering a nuclear meltdown and allowing him to defeat Ghidorah by achieving his burning form. During the credits, a news program speculates about the existence of a second Mothra egg, which the director later confirmed.

Mothra returned in Godzilla x Kong: The New Empire. When the Iwi sense that the tyrannical Skar King is about to come for them, they send a signal to Jia, the sole survivor of the Iwi tribe from Skull Island, so she can find them and re-awaken Mothra to aid Godzilla in battle. After a wounded Kong tells them the Skar King is on his way, Jia successfully reawakens Mothra. Mothra reunites with Godzilla and convinces him to join forces with Kong. Mothra then joins the battle in the Hollow Earth and takes down Skar King's apes, preventing them from reaching the surface. She also aids Godzilla when Shimo, the mother Titan under Skar King's control, almost freezes him. Eventually Godzilla and Kong manage to come out victorious, with Shimo being freed from Skar King's control and starts freezing him over so that Kong can eventually destroy him. Mothra then helps the Iwi rebuild the barrier that protects them and then flies off deep into Hollow Earth.

== Appearances ==
=== Films ===
- Mothra (1961)
- Mothra vs. Godzilla (1964)
- Ghidorah, the Three-Headed Monster (1964)
- Ebirah, Horror of the Deep (1966)
- Destroy All Monsters (1968)
- Godzilla vs. Mothra (1992)
- Godzilla vs. SpaceGodzilla (1994) - with Fairy Mothra
- Rebirth of Mothra (1996) - with Fairy Mothra
- Rebirth of Mothra II (1997) - with Fairy Mothra
- Rebirth of Mothra III (1998) - with Fairy Mothra
- Godzilla, Mothra and King Ghidorah: Giant Monsters All-Out Attack (2001)
- Godzilla Against Mechagodzilla (2002, stock footage)
- Godzilla: Tokyo S.O.S. (2003)
- Godzilla: Final Wars (2004)
- Kaiju Bunraku (2017)
- Kong: Skull Island (2017, cave painting)
- Godzilla: The Planet Eater (2018)
- Godzilla: King of the Monsters (2019)
- Godzilla x Kong: The New Empire (2024)

=== Television ===
- Godzilland (1992–1993)
- Godzilla Island (1997–1998)
- Godziban (2019–present)
- I'm Home! Chibi Godzilla (2020–2021)
- Godzilla Singular Point (2021)
- Chibi Godzilla Raids Again (2023–present)
- Godziburst (2025–present)

=== Video games ===
- Godzilla: Monster of Monsters! (Nintendo Entertainment System - 1988)
- Godzilla 2: War of the Monsters (Nintendo Entertainment System - 1991)
- Kaijū-ō Godzilla / King of the Monsters, Godzilla (Game Boy - 1993)
- Godzilla: Monster War / Godzilla: Destroy All Monsters (Super Famicom - 1994)
- Godzilla Giant Monster March (Game Gear - 1995)
- Godzilla Trading Battle (PlayStation - 1998)
- Godzilla Generations: Maximum Impact (Dreamcast - 1999)
- Godzilla: Destroy All Monsters Melee (GameCube, Xbox - 2002/2003)
- Godzilla: Domination! (Game Boy Advance - 2002)
- Godzilla: Save the Earth (Xbox, PlayStation 2 - 2004)
- World of Warcraft (Microsoft Windows - 2004) (reference)
- Godzilla: Unleashed (Wii - 2007)
- Godzilla Unleashed: Double Smash (Nintendo DS - 2007)
- Godzilla: Unleashed (PlayStation 2 - 2007)
- Terraria (Windows - 2012) (reference)
- Godzilla (PlayStation3 - 2014, PlayStation 4 - 2015)
- City Shrouded in Shadow (PlayStation4 - 2017)
- Godzilla Defense Force (2019)
- Godzilla Battle Line (2021)
- Fortnite Battle Royale (2025)

=== Literature ===
- The Luminous Fairies and Mothra (serialized novel) (1961)
- Godzilla 2000 (1996)
- Godzilla at World's End (1998)
- Godzilla: Kingdom of Monsters (comic 2011-2012)
- Godzilla: Gangsters and Goliaths (comic 2011)
- Godzilla: Legends (comic 2011-2012)
- Godzilla (comic 2012)
- Godzilla: The Half-Century War (comic 2012-2013)
- Godzilla: Rulers of Earth (comic 2013-2015)
- Godzilla: Cataclysm (comic 2014)
- Godzilla: Oblivion (comic 2016)
- Godzilla: Rage Across Time (comic 2016)
- Godzilla: Project Mechagodzilla (novel 2018)
- Godzilla Rivals (comic 2021)
- Mothra: Queen of the Monsters (comic 2025)

=== Music ===
- 'Mothra', song by Anvil (Metal on Metal, 1982)
- 'Mothra', song by Atomship (The Crash of '47, 2004)
- 'Mothra', song by Godflesh
- 'Summoning the Moth of Divinity', song by Oxygen Destroyer

=== Collectible card game ===
- Mothra, Supersonic Queen, a reskinned Luminous Broodmoth card from Magic: The Gathering, part of the Ikoria: Lair of Behemoths set released in 2020.

== Cultural impact ==
Mothra has often been interpreted as a more humane and explicitly feminine counterpoint to Godzilla. One academic analysis described her as the "first Japanese monster to be treated as a moral force", while later commentary, such as in PopMatters, have framed the character as an "icon of soft power and femininity" and noticed that fan discourse often refers to her as the "Queen of the Monsters". The character's theme song has also become a recognizable piece of pop culture, with Steve Ryfle noting that many people who have never seen the original 1961 film or any of her later appearances still recognize the tune.

== Bibliography ==
- Di Giorgio, Davide; Gigante, Andrea; Gordiano, Lupi (2012). Godzilla: Il re Dei Mostri – Il Sauro Radioattivo di Honda e Tsuburaya (in Italian). Associazione Culturale Il Foglio. ISBN 9788876063510.
- Kalat, David (2010). A Critical History and Filmography of Toho's Godzilla Series - Second Edition. McFarland. ISBN 9780786447497.
- Ryfle, Steve (1998). Japan's Favorite Mon-Star: The Unauthorized Biography of the Big G. ECW Press. ISBN 1550223488.
- Ryfle, Steve; Godziszewski, Ed (2009). Mothra Audio Commentary (DVD). Sony.
