= Robert Dunham =

American actor, entrepreneur, writer, racecar driver, journalist and US Marine

- Dunham on the set of Dogora
- Born: July 6, 1931; Portland, Maine, U.S.
- Died: August 6, 2001 (aged 70); Sarasota, Florida, U.S.
- Other names: Dan Yuma; Danny Yuma
- Occupations: U.S. Marine, actor, writer, racecar driver, journalist, entrepreneur
- Spouse(s): Keiko (1954–1968); Setsuko Sazawa (1969–1984)
- Children: 4 (survived by a daughter, Barbara Subayashi of Tokyo, and a son, Daniel of Tokyo).

Robert Dunham (July 6, 1931 – August 6, 2001) was an American actor, entrepreneur, writer, racecar driver, journalist, and a US Marine.

He is probably best known for his role as Antonio, Emperor of Seatopia in Godzilla vs. Megalon (1973); Dunham's biggest role would be that of Mark Jackson in the Japanese film, Dogora (1964) and Captain Martin in The Green Slime (1968). Dunham was an American living in Japan during most of the country's "Golden Age" of cinema, and worked in films directed by Ishirō Honda, Jun Fukuda, and Kinji Fukasaku. He sometimes was billed as Dan Yuma or Danny Yuma.

Born in Maine, to an affluent family, his parents were Earl and Charlotte Dunham. He has a sister named Patricia June. Robert grew up in Wellesley Hills, Massachusetts. He attended Noble and Greenough School in Dedham, Massachusetts. Dunham was later accepted into Williams College, in Williamstown, Massachusetts, where he received his Bachelor of Arts degree in Art History.

After graduating college, Dunham joined the United States Marine Corps. He was stationed in Yokohama, Japan and served for two years as a lieutenant. Later, he attended correspondence school to learn how to speak Japanese. After being honorably discharged from the Marine Corps., Dunham decided to stay in Japan and opened up his own import/export business.

Dunham lived in Tokyo for 22 years, with a Japanese wife Keiko, and their two children, Barbara Ann and Daniel. They later divorced. He met a Japanese model, Setsuko Sazawa, whom he married in 1969. They had two children, Emiko (Emmy) and Marcia. Dunham and his wife Setsuko, moved to Den-en-chōfu, an affluent suburb of Tokyo, where they lived from 1970 to 1975.

In 1975, Dunham decided to move his family to the United States and moved to Cape Cod, Massachusetts. He became a freelance writer, often contributing material to magazines such as Car and Driver.

Unlike many other Westerners in Japanese films at the time, Dunham spoke fluent Japanese and as such, was one of few foreign actors who would maintain their real voice in the released product without the need of over-dubbing by a Japanese actor. Dunham admitted to having had a "torrid love affair" with his co-star of many films, Linda Miller. The relationship ended after Miller moved back to the United States and Dunham claimed to have "lost track of her" after having kept up correspondence via postal mail for a time.

He had worked as a security guard for the Sarasota, Florida, Herald-Tribune, and performed in the Players Theatre of Sarasota and Venice Little Theater. He also had formed his own production company, Suncoast/Yuma Productions, writing, producing and directing a full-length film, "Samantha."

== Filmography ==
Year	Title	Role	Notes
1960	Dangan taisho		
1960	Ore no kokyô wa western		
1961	Mothra	Police chief of New York City	
1961	Marines, Let's Go	Marine	Uncredited
1961	The Last War	Allied Forces Personnel	Uncredited
1961	High Noon for Gangsters	John Kennedy	
1962	King Kong vs. Godzilla	US Navy Pilot	Uncredited
1962	Yumin-gai no Judan	Parker	
1964	Woman in the Dunes		
1964	Flight from Ashiya	Air Rescue Service Crew Member in Plane	Uncredited
1964	Mothra vs. Godzilla	US Navy Soldier	Uncredited
1964	Dogora, the Space Monster	Mark Jackson	
1966	The Face of Another	Foreign man in Bar	Uncredited
1968	The Green Slime	Captain Martin	
1973	Sotsugyô ryokô	Al Sax	
1973	Godzilla vs. Megalon	Antonio, Emperor of Seatopia / Motorcycle assailant	
1974	Godzilla vs. Mechagodzilla		
1974	ESPY	Captain special passenger plane	
1997	Ionopsis	Yten	(final film role)
