= Yoshie Hotta =

Japanese writer

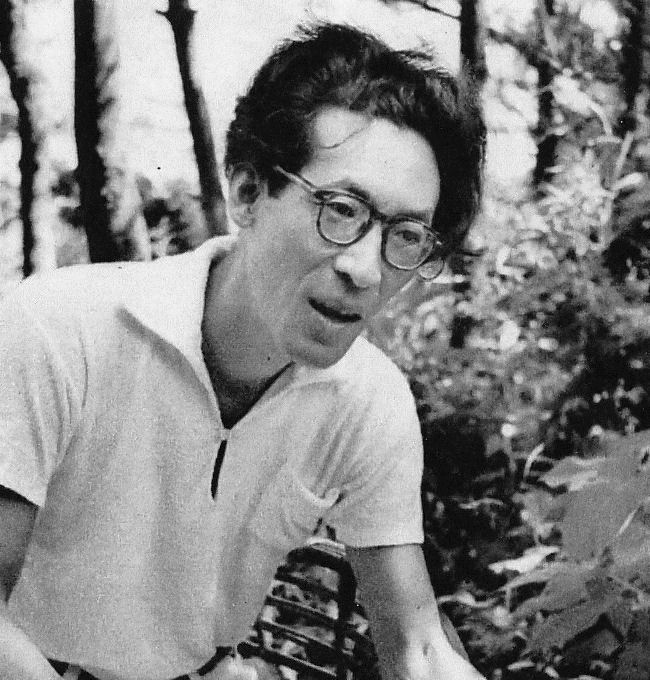
- Yoshie Hotta in 1954
- Born: 17 July 1918; Takaoka, Toyama Prefecture, Japan
- Died: 5 September 1998 (aged 80)
- Education: Keio University
- Occupation: Writer

Yoshie Hotta (堀田善衛, Hotta Yoshie; July 17, 1918 – September 5, 1998) was a Japanese writer of novels, short stories, poetry and essays, noted for his political consciousness. His most acclaimed works include Hiroba no kodoku (lit. "Solitude in the Public Square", 1951), which was awarded the Akutagawa Prize, and Kage no bubun (Shadow Pieces, 1952). Hotta has also been associated with the Atomic bomb literature genre.

== Biography ==
A graduate from Keio University, Hotta already published poems and essays in the literary journal Hihyō during his student years. He experienced the end of the Pacific War in Shanghai, where he stayed for two years to write for the Chinese Nationalist Party before returning to Japan in 1947. His early works centered on Japan's recent history, thematising events like the bombing of Hiroshima (in Kage no bubun, 1952, or Shimpan, 1963) or the Nanjing Massacre (in Jikan, 1955), and life in Japan during the early post-war years. Later, he turned his attention also to International relationships and history, attending meetings of the Afro-Asian Writers' Association and writing books about historic figures like Goya, Montaigne and François de La Rochefoucauld.

== Selected works ==
- 1951: Hiroba no kodoku
- 1952: Kage no bubun (Shadow Pieces)
- 1952: Kankan
- 1952: Rekishi
- 1955: Jikan
- 1957: Indo de kangaeta koto
- 1963: Shimpan (Judgment)
- 1971: Hōjōki shiki
- 1974–77: Goya
- 1991–94: Misheru jōkan no hito
- 1998: Ra Roshufūkō kōshaku densetsu

== Awards ==
- 1951: Akutagawa Prize for Hiroba no kōdoku
- 1971: Mainichi Publishing Culture Award for Hōjōki shiki
- 1977: Jirō Osaragi Prize for Goya
- 1977: Lotus Prize for Literature
- 1994: Asahi Prize
- 1998: Japan Art Academy Prize for Literature

== Adaptations ==
Hiroba no kodoku was adapted into a film in 1953, written by Katsuhito Inomata and directed by and starring Shin Saburi.

Together with Shin'ichirō Nakamura and Takehiko Fukunaga, Hotta wrote the original story which was later adapted into the kaiju film Mothra, first published in Asahi Shimbun.

== Bibliography ==
- Hotta, Yoshie (1994). Judgment. Translated by Tsukui, Nobuko. Osaka: Kansai Gaidai University.
- Rimer, J. Thomas; Gessel, Van C. (2007). "Hotta Yoshie (includes one translated chapter of Kage no bubun)". The Columbia Anthology of Modern Japanese Literature: From 1945 to the present. Columbia University Press. ISBN 9780231138048.
- O'Neill, P.G. (2001). "Shadow Pieces (Kage no bubun)". Collected Writings of P.G. O'Neill: The Collected Writings of Modern Western Scholars on Japan. Vol. 4. Tokyo: Japan Library and Edition Synapse. ISBN 1-873410-50-6.
