= Ghidorah, the Three-Headed Monster =

1964 Japanese film by Ishirō Honda

- Theatrical release poster

Japanese name
- Kanji: 三大怪獣 地球最大の決戦
- Literal meaning: Three Giant Monsters: Earth's Greatest Battle
Transcriptions
- Revised Hepburn: San Daikaijū: Chikyū Saidai no Kessen
- Directed by: Ishirō Honda
- Special effects by: Eiji Tsuburaya
- Screenplay by: Shinichi Sekizawa
- Produced by: Tomoyuki Tanaka
- Starring: Yosuke Natsuki; Hiroshi Koizumi; Yuriko Hoshi; Akiko Wakabayashi
- Cinematography: Hajime Koizumi
- Edited by: Ryohei Fujii
- Music by: Akira Ifukube
- Production company: Toho Co., Ltd.
- Distributed by: Toho
- Release date: December 20, 1964 (Japan)
- Running time: 93 minutes
- Country: Japan
- Language: Japanese
- Budget: ¥133 million
- Box office: $2.3 million (Japan & U.S. rentals)

Ghidorah, the Three-Headed Monster (Japanese: 三大怪獣 地球最大の決戦, Hepburn: San Daikaijū Chikyū Saidai no Kessen; lit. Three Giant Monsters: Earth's Greatest Battle) is a 1964 Japanese kaiju film directed by Ishirō Honda, with special effects by Eiji Tsuburaya. Produced and distributed by Toho Co., Ltd., it is the fifth film in the Godzilla franchise, and was the second Godzilla film produced that year, after Mothra vs. Godzilla. The film stars Yosuke Natsuki, Hiroshi Koizumi, Akiko Wakabayashi, with Haruo Nakajima as Godzilla, Masanori Shinohara as Rodan, and Shoichi Hirose as King Ghidorah. In the film, an extraterrestrial from Venus, possessing the body of a princess, warns humanity of the pending destruction by the three headed golden draconic extraterrestrial King Ghidorah, with Godzilla, Rodan, and Mothra being their last hope for survival.

The film was rushed into production in order to replace Red Beard, which fell behind schedule, in Toho's New Year's holiday slate. The Godzilla suit and Mothra larva prop were recycled from the previous film, with modifications added, while new suits were produced for Rodan and Ghidorah, the latter creating on-set difficulties due to multiple wires attached to the suit. Principal photography began and ended in 1964 in Mount Aso, Yokohama, Gotenba, and Ueno Park.

Ghidorah, the Three-Headed Monster was theatrically released in Japan on December 20, 1964, followed by a theatrical release in the United States on September 29, 1965, by Continental Distributing as Ghidrah, the Three-Headed Monster. It earned ¥375 million (over $1 million) at the Japanese box office and $1.3 million at the American box office. The film received generally positive reviews from early and contemporary American critics.

The film was followed by Invasion of Astro-Monster, released on December 19, 1965.

== Plot ==
Reporter Naoko Shindo attends a communications session with the UFO society for her television program. However, it is deemed a failure due to Naoko's skepticism. A meteor shower soon descends on Japan, with the largest meteor crashing on Mount Kurodake. Naoko's brother, Detective Shindo, is assigned to guard Princess Salno of Selgina from a political assassination during an unannounced visit to Japan. En route to Japan, an alien entity leads Salno to jump from her plane before it explodes. Professor Miura leads a research team to Mt. Kurodake to investigate the large meteor, where they discover it randomly emitting magnetic waves. Naoko is sent to investigate a prophetess claiming to be from Venus, who predicts that the Pteranodon-like creature, Rodan will emerge from Mount Aso.

The Prophetess catches the attention of both Shindo and Salno's uncle, both of whom recognize her as the supposedly dead Salno. Responsible for the assassination plot, Salno's uncle sends the assassin, Malmess, to kill her. After participating in a TV program, the Shobijin, Mothra's twin fairies, prepare to depart for home but are warned by the Prophetess to not sail. Naoko takes the Prophetess to a hotel to interview her, and discovers that the Shobijin have been following them, heeding the Prophetess' warning before the prehistoric sea monster Godzilla sunk their ship. After confirming that the Prophetess is Salno, Shindo finds her at the hotel and saves her from Malmess. They evacuate after Godzilla and Rodan converge on the city and battle throughout the countryside.

After psychiatrist Dr. Tsukamoto concludes that the Prophetess is human, she predicts the arrival of the alien-dragon King Ghidorah, a monster that destroyed her home on Venus. Miura and his team witness the meteor explode, unleashing the golden three-headed space dragon Ghidorah, who proceeds to attack Matsumoto. The authorities plea with the Shobijin to summon the larva monster Mothra for help, but they warn that Mothra alone could not defeat Ghidorah, and their only hope would be for Godzilla, Rodan, and Mothra to join forces. Under hypnosis, the Prophetess reveals that some Venusians escaped to Earth from Ghidorah and assimilated with humans, but at the cost of losing most of their abilities except prediction.

After Malmess overhears Tsukamoto recommending shock therapy next, he increases the voltage to a fatal degree, but fails after the power lines are destroyed by Godzilla. After thwarting Malmess and his crew, Shindo evacuates to the mountains with the Prophetess, Tsukamoto, Naoko, Miura, and the Shobijin. Mothra attempts to convince Godzilla and Rodan to set aside their differences to save the planet, but both refuse due to years of harassment from humans. However, after seeing Mothra attempt to battle Ghidorah on her own, Godzilla and Rodan change their minds and rush to her aid. The Prophetess wanders off and regains her memories after Malmess nearly kills her. Shindo manages to protect her just in time and Malmess falls to his death. The monsters overwhelm Ghidorah and force it to flee into outer space. Prior to departing for home, Princess Salno reveals to Shindo that she has no memory as the Prophetess, but remembers the three events when Shindo saved her, and thanks him and Naoko for their help. Godzilla and Rodan watch as Mothra journeys back home with the Shobijin, who bid farewell to all.

== Cast ==
- Yosuke Natsuki as Detective Shindo
- Yuriko Hoshi as Naoko Shindo
- Hiroshi Koizumi as Professor Miura
- Akiko Wakabayashi as Princess Mas Dorina Salno
- The Peanuts as the Shobijin
- Takashi Shimura as Dr. Tsukamoto
- Hisaya Ito as Malmess
- Akihiko Hirata as Security Chief Okita
- Kenji Sahara as Kanamaki
- Susumu Kurobe as Assassin
- Ikio Sawamura as Fisherman
- Haruo Nakajima as Godzilla
- Masanori Shinohara as Rodan
- Shoichi Hirose as King Ghidorah

Cast taken from Japan's Favorite Mon-star.

== Production ==
=== Crew ===
- Ishirō Honda (Note: Credited as "Inoshiro Honda" in the American version of the film.) – director
- Eiji Tsuburaya – special effects director
- Ken Sano – assistant director
- Shigeru Nakamura – production manager
- Takeo Kita – art director
- Sadamasa Arikawa – special effects photography
- Akira Watanabe – special effects art director
- Hiroshi Mukoyama – optical effects

Personnel taken from Japan's Favorite Mon-star.

=== Development ===
"[Ghidorah] is basically Yamata no Orochi. It is an old folktale, and we wrote it as a creature from outer space. It is fine for audiences to think that way, but I do not believe it was written with such a political notion."

— Honda on the theory that Ghidorah symbolized China's nuclear threat.

Toho originally intended to release Red Beard, also produced by Tomoyuki Tanaka, for the New Year's holiday. However, the film fell behind schedule and Tanaka rushed Ghidorah, the Three-Headed Monster into production to replace the New Year's release slot. After the success of previous cross-over films such as King Kong vs. Godzilla and Mothra vs. Godzilla, Tanaka decided to develop a film that would feature Godzilla, Rodan and Mothra.

The new monster King Ghidorah was designed as an homage to Yamata no Orochi. Film historian David Kalat noted that screenwriter Shinichi Sekizawa introduced aliens, like Ghidorah and the eponymous Dogora, because he grew tired of tropes where monsters were either awakened by nuclear weapons or worshipped as Gods by indigenous groups. Yoshio Tsuchiya was originally attached to play Malmess but his commitments to Red Beard prevented him from participating. Honda felt "uncomfortable" with Toho and Tsuburaya's decision to anthropomorphize the monsters and was reluctant to use the singing duo The Peanuts as translators for the summit scene. The film was shot on various locations, such as Mount Aso, Yokohama, Gotenba, and Ueno Park.

Akiko Wakabayashi chose to portray her character similar to a sleepwalker and purposefully avoided eye contact while in character. Honda asked her to take inspiration from Audrey Hepburn's character from Roman Holiday, and based her character's homely attire on Wakabayashi's real attire; Honda had once spotted her on the studio in jeans and a "bug guy's hat." Wakabayashi was allowed, by Honda, to sleep on the gurney during takes for the shock therapy scenes due to working on a different film the previous night without sleep, and was briefly blinded by the Venusian's flash of light.

=== Special effects ===
The film's special effects were directed by Eiji Tsuburaya, while Teruyoshi Nakano served as the assistant special effects director. For Ghidorah's hatching scene, a variety of techniques were used such as a miniature meteorite prop, and pyrotechnics; optical animation was used for the hovering fireball and Ghidorah's rays. For the Yokohama sequence, pyrotechnics were wire-rigged to send up debris, and fans were used to emulate strong winds. Haruo Nakajima reprised his role as Godzilla, having portrayed the character in the previous four Godzilla films. The effects crew recycled the Godzilla suit from Mothra vs. Godzilla but alterations were made to the head such was replacing the original glass-like wooden eyes with radio-controlled eyeballs, and marginally flattening the head by installing mechanics. Katsumi Tezuka portrayed the Mothra larva prop that was also recycled from Mothra vs. Godzilla, and its eyes were changed from blue to red. Masanori Shinohara portrayed Rodan via a new suit that was constructed with a different appearance for the face, with a muscular neck and triangular wings.

King Ghidorah was designed by Akira Watanabe, with the wings originally intended to bear a rainbow-like hue. Ghidorah was portrayed by Shoichi Hirose, and it proved a grueling task for Hirose which required him to spend hours inside the suit, hunched over and only using a supportive crossbar, while a team of seven men handled the wires attached to the necks, tails, and wings over the soundstage rafters. Filming of the Ghidorah scenes caused delays for various reasons: the necks would tangle with each other, the studio lights would be reflected on the plastic wires, and wires would get caught in the suit's scales. Effects cameraman Sadamasa Arikawa described it as an "agonizing operation". Sekizawa suggested to Tsuburaya that the Ghidorah suit be built from lightweight silicon-based materials to allow more mobility for the suit performer. Small models of the monsters were also used for far away shots or flying shots of Rodan and King Ghidorah.

The set for the base of Mt. Fuji was built at a 1/25th scale and took 12,000 hours to build. The set was raised so cameras could be positioned at low angles. The miniature buildings were built with working sliding doors, and lights, and were built backless, to be seen from one direction. The miniatures meant to be destroyed were pre-cut and compressed. Miniature buildings that were not meant to be destroyed were repurposed for later scenes or other sets. While filming Godzilla and Rodan's battle in Toho's massive water tank, one of the edges of the tank was exposed on film. Tsuburaya hid this error by superimposing trees on the exposed area.

== Release ==
=== Theatrical and box office ===
Ghidorah the Three-Headed Monster was released theatrically in Japan on December 20, 1964, by Toho, on a double-bill with Samurai Joker. The film earned ¥375 million (over $1 million) in distributor rentals at the Japanese box office, and became the fourth highest-grossing film between 1964 and 1965. In 1971, a heavily re-edited version was screened at the Toho Champion Festival, a children's festival centered on marathon screenings of kaiju films and cartoons. For the Champion Festival, the film was re-titled Godzilla, Mothra, King Ghidorah: Greatest Battle on Earth (ゴジラ・モスラ・キングギドラ 地球最大の決戦, Gojira, Mosura, Kingu Ghidorah: Chikyu Saidai No Kessen), was re-edited by Honda, and runs 73 minutes. The Champion festival release sold 1.09 million tickets.

Months after the film's Japanese release, the film was acquired by Walter Reade-Sterling, Inc., with plans to distribute the film in the United States through their subsidiary, Continental Distributing. The film was theatrically released in the United States on September 29, 1965, as Ghidrah, the Three-Headed Monster. The film opened to 83 theaters in Boston, on a double-bill with Agent 8 3/4. In later areas, it was double-billed with Harum Scarum. Continental relayed to Variety that the film grossed $1.3 million, including earning $200,000 in film rentals within five days after its release. To promote the film in the United States, Ghidorah masks were created as promotional tie-ins with local supermarkets and radio stations.

=== American version ===
The dubbing of the American version was supervised by Joseph Belucci, and runs at 85 minutes. The American version shifts some scenes and removes some outright, Akira Ifukube's score is replaced with library music during some of the Godzilla/Rodan battle scenes, Mars replaces Venus in the prophetess's dialog, and a rough translation was provided for Cry for Happiness, which is read off-camera by Annie Sukiyaki. Some alterations from the American version were added to the Champion Festival release. Film historian David Kalat opined that the American version is superior in some ways, stating that the film is dramatically tightened and that continuity corrections resulted in an "improvement over the original".

=== Critical response ===
On the review aggregator website Rotten Tomatoes, 77% of 13 critics' reviews are positive, with an average rating of 5.8/10.

Vincent Canby of The New York Times found Ghidorah, the Three-Headed Monster to be a better film than Harum Scarum (both films were bundled on a double-bill) but found that it would appeal to fans of comic book culture and may interest social historians over what Canby perceives as Japan's fascination at destroying their homeland with monsters. While Variety criticized the dubbing as "atrocious", they praised Honda's ability to incite cheers from audiences when the Earth monsters unite.

Leonard Maltin awarded the film two and a half stars, calling it "one of the better Toho monster rallies”. Phil Hardy's book Science Fiction noted that the film's visual effects "are better than usual and the cast includes Okada (Mistakenly believing actor Eiji Okada to be in the film), best known for his performance in Resnais' Hiroshima Mon Amour (1959), as well as the brilliant Shimura, star of Kurosawa's Ikiru (1952)." Slant Magazine awarded the film three stars out of four and stated that the film "embodies much of what the popular monster films have come to be known for over the years: reptilian wrestling matches on a citywide scale, human drama paralleling the monster threat, rubbery creature effects, and the gleeful destruction of many a miniature architectural set piece."

Film historian August Ragone called the monster effects "somewhat uneven," but added that "Tsuburaya still delivers a punch with the production's bountiful visual effects."

Den of Geek ranked the film at number two in their 2019 ranking of the Shōwa Godzilla films, calling it a "superb entry" and describing the battle sequences as "classic." Screen Rant ranked it at number six on their list of the "Best Kaiju Movies Featuring Mothra", describing its plot one of the more "whacky" entries within the genre. Collider ranked the film number four on their Shōwa Godzilla list in 2022, praising the balance at depicting the monsters as genuine threats while expressing glee at their antics, calling such an approach one of the best "mixes" of the franchise's Shōwa era."

== Home media ==
=== Japan ===
In 2008, Toho remastered the film in High-definition and premiered it on the Japanese Movie Speciality Channel, along with the rest of the Godzilla films also remastered in HD. In 2021, Toho premiered a 4K remaster of the film on the Nippon Classic Movie Channel, along with seven other Godzilla films also remastered in 4K. The film was downscaled to 2K for broadcast.

=== United States ===
In 2007, Classic Media released the film on DVD in North America, along with other Godzilla titles. This release included the remastered, widescreen versions of the Japanese and American versions, as well as a biography on Eiji Tsuburaya, image galleries, promotional material, and an audio commentary by David Kalat. In 2017, Janus Films and the Criterion Collection acquired the film, as well as other Godzilla titles, to stream on Starz and FilmStruck. In 2019, the Japanese version was included in a Blu-ray box set released by the Criterion Collection, which included all 15 films from the franchise's Shōwa era. In May 2020, the Japanese version became available on HBO Max upon its launch.

== Legacy ==
The film marks the debut of King Ghidorah, a recurring antagonist of the Godzilla franchise. Ragone described King Ghidorah as "one of the most famous and popular creations in the Toho canon." Don Kaye from Den of Geek echoed these sentiments, stating, "Ghidorah remains a formidable enemy, which is why his debut is still one of the best-remembered entries in the series." The film was also the turning point in Godzilla's transformation from villain to hero, with Godzilla taking on a radioactive superhero role. The film also marks the first ensemble between Godzilla and other established monster characters.

== See also ==
- List of films featuring dinosaurs
- List of Japanese films of 1964
- List of science fiction films of the 1960s
