= Akira Watanabe (art director) =

Japanese art director

- 渡辺 明
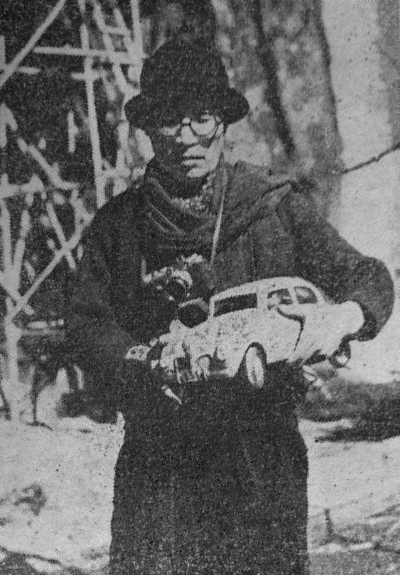
- Watanabe on set of Lady from Hell.
- Born: May 13, 1908; Fukui, Japan
- Died: 1999 (aged 90–91)
- Occupations: Art director, special effects director
- Years active: 1942-1968

Akira Watanabe (Japanese: 渡辺 明, Hepburn: Watanabe Akira; May 13, 1908 – 1999) was a Japanese special effects art director who worked on 38 films in a career spanning 25 years.

== Career ==
On April 1, 1929, Watanabe graduating from art school, and joined Shochiku as an assistant director, then transferred to Toho in 1941 upon the recommendation of Eiji Tsuburaya, working on his first film with the company the following year. He left Toho in 1966 after serving as Tsuburaya's art director on Invasion of Astro-Monster. With Japanese Special Effects Productions, which was later called Japanese Special Effects Film Co., Ltd., he directed special effects on Gappa: The Triphibian Monster, Nikkatsu's sole Showa kaiju film, and the Japanese-American co-production The Green Slime.

== Partial filmography ==
=== Special effects art director ===
- The War at Sea from Hawaii to Malaya (1942)
- Lady from Hell (1949)
- Nangoku no hada (1952)
- Godzilla (1954)
- Godzilla Raids Again (1955)
- Half Human (1955)
- The Legend of the White Serpent (1956)
- Rodan (1956)
- The Mysterians (1957)
- The H-Man (1958)
- Varan the Unbelievable (1958)
- Monkey Sun (1959)
- The Three Treasures (1959)
- Battle in Outer Space (1959)
- The Secret of the Telegian (1960)
- The Human Vapor (1960)
- The Story of Osaka Castle (1961)
- The Big Wave (1961)
- Mothra (1961)
- The Last War (1961)
- Gorath (1962)
- King Kong vs. Godzilla (1962)
- Matango (1963)
- Atragon (1963)
- Mothra vs. Godzilla (1964)
- Dogora (1964)
- Ghidorah, the Three-Headed Monster (1964)
- Frankenstein vs. Baragon (1965)
- Crazy Adventure (1965)
- Invasion of Astro-Monster (1965)
- Ultra Q (1966)

=== Special effects director ===
- Gappa: The Triphibian Monster (1967)
- The X from Outer Space (1967)
- The Green Slime (1968)

=== Miscellaneous ===
- Dogora (1964) - Special effects cameraman
- Gappa: The Triphibian Monster (1967) - Story
