= Mothra vs. Godzilla =

1964 Japanese kaiju film

- Theatrical release poster

Japanese name
- Kanji: モスラ対ゴジラ
Transcriptions
- Revised Hepburn: Mosura tai Gojira
- Directed by: Ishirō Honda
- Special effects by: Eiji Tsuburaya
- Screenplay by: Shinichi Sekizawa
- Produced by: Tomoyuki Tanaka; Sanezumi Fujimoto
- Starring: Akira Takarada; Yuriko Hoshi; The Peanuts; Hiroshi Koizumi
- Cinematography: Hajime Koizumi
- Edited by: Ryohei Fujii
- Music by: Akira Ifukube
- Production company: Toho Co., Ltd.
- Distributed by: Toho
- Release date: April 29, 1964 (Japan)
- Running time: 88 minutes
- Country: Japan
- Language: Japanese
- Budget: ¥143 million
- Box office: ¥3.2 billion (Japan est.)

Mothra vs. Godzilla (Japanese: モスラ対ゴジラ, Hepburn: Mosura tai Gojira) (Note: Although the film was released in Japan as Mothra vs. Godzilla, the Japanese theatrical release poster for the film also provides the English title Godzilla Against Mothra. In 1964, American International Pictures released the film theatrically in the United States under the title Godzilla vs. the Thing. In 1989, Paramount Home Video released the film on VHS in the U.S. as Godzilla vs. Mothra.) is a 1964 Japanese kaiju film directed by Ishirō Honda, with special effects by Eiji Tsuburaya. Produced and distributed by Toho Co., Ltd., it is the fourth film in the Godzilla franchise. The film stars Akira Takarada, Yuriko Hoshi, Hiroshi Koizumi, Kenji Sahara, and Emi and Yumi Itō, with Haruo Nakajima and Katsumi Tezuka as Godzilla. In the film, humans beseech the aid of the divine moth Mothra to stop Godzilla from destroying Japan.

Due to the success of Mothra (1961) and King Kong vs. Godzilla (1962), Toho chose to pair Godzilla against Mothra for the following film. The film was intended for children as well as adults, as a way to compete with television's growing popularity in Japan. A new Godzilla suit and Mothra prop were built although the 1962 Godzilla suit was used for water scenes. At Tsuburaya's insistence, Toho purchased an Oxberry 1900 optical printer to remove damages in composite photography shots. It is the final film in the franchise's Shōwa era to depict Godzilla as the antagonist.

Mothra vs. Godzilla was released theatrically in Japan on April 29, 1964. An edited version titled Godzilla vs. the Thing was released by American International Pictures in the United States on August 26, 1964. The film received generally positive reviews from early and contemporary American critics. American film historians have praised the film's themes of unity, greed, and Honda's depiction of Godzilla as a "specter of nuclear annihilation" and a symbol of moral judgement.

The film was followed by Ghidorah, the Three-Headed Monster, released on December 20, 1964.

== Plot ==
Kurata Beach is stricken by a typhoon. The following morning, reporter Ichiro Sakai and his photographer Junko Nakanishi find a strange blue-gray object amongst the wreckage. Later, a giant egg is found floating near Nishi Beach in Shizunoura. Professor Miura attempts to investigate the egg, only to be pestered with questions by Sakai. They soon learn that the villagers had sold the egg to businessman Kumayama for exploitation purposes for his firm Happy Enterprises. At a local hotel, Sakai, Junko, and Miura discuss how to legally counter Kumayama's plans, and find him at the lobby. Kumayama meets with his financial backer Jiro Torahata, who reveals his plans to build the Shizunoura Happy Center around the egg. They are visited by the Shobijin, tiny twin fairies, who attempt to convince them to return the egg but have to escape when the businessmen try to capture them. The Shobijin run into Sakai, Junko, and Miura, and reveal to them that the egg belongs to the colossal insect god Mothra, the recent typhoon caused it to wash up on Japanese waters, and destruction will follow when the larva emerges. The trio agree to help them retrieve the egg, and try to plead with Kumayama and Torahata but are met with resistance. The Shobijin eventually return home to Infant Island without the egg.

Later, Sakai writes scathing articles about Happy Enterprises' insensitivity towards the Shobijin. However, the firm dismisses the articles as slander and open the Shizunoura Happy Center to the public. Kumayama is confronted by the villagers for not paying in full for the egg and renting from their land. Torahata agrees to loan Kumayama additional funds in exchange for putting the egg up as collateral. Kumayama reluctantly accepts and begins incubating the egg. Miura decontaminates Sakai and Junko after examining the object they found in the wreckage and determining it to be highly radioactive. The trio return to Kurata beach to investigate further, but the giant reptilian monster Godzilla emerges from the buried mud, revealing the object to be one of its scales. Citizens evacuate as Godzilla wreaks havoc on Yokkaichi and Nagoya. The Japan Self-Defense Forces (JSDF) are deployed to lead Godzilla to the coast to minimize casualties.

At the suggestion of a colleague, the trio travel to Infant Island to appeal to the Shobijin for Mothra's help. When they arrive, they are horrified by the desolation left behind by past nuclear tests. They are captured by the natives and reveal their intentions to ask for Mothra's help against Godzilla. The Shobijin and natives refuse, seeing it as divine retribution on outsiders for ravaging their island with nuclear tests, and not returning the egg. Junko and Sakai plead that the innocent are also in danger, that they have no right to decide who deserves to live or die, and that civilization is flawed, but is trying hard to make the world better. Mothra agrees to help, but the Shobijin warn that she is on her deathbed.

Back in Japan, the JSDF launch multiple campaigns against Godzilla but to no avail. After losing his fortune, Kumayama confronts Torahata at his hotel, attacks him, and steals his secret funds. Torahata shoots Kumayama, and attempts to escape with the money, but is crushed to death as Godzilla destroys the hotel. Godzilla reaches Nishi Beach, and prepares to destroy the egg until Mothra intervenes and engages Godzilla in battle. Mothra initially gets the upper hand, but is defeated by Godzilla's atomic breath. Mothra uses her last strength to fly to the egg and die next to it.

As the JSDF resume their attacks on Godzilla, the trio and the Shobijin remain with the egg as the twins attempt to make the egg hatch more quickly via musical incantations. On Infant Island, the natives join in a ritual dance, in response to the twins' music. Twin larvae emerge from the egg and follow Godzilla to Iwa island. As the monsters battle, the trio join a rescue party to retrieve students and their teacher left behind on Iwa Island. Godzilla is entrapped by the larvas' silk, tumbles into the sea and sinks. The students and teacher are returned to safety, and the larvae and Shobijin return to Infant Island. Sakai asserts that humanity will thank them by building a better world built on trust.

== Cast ==
- Akira Takarada as Ichiro Sakai
- Yuriko Hoshi as Junko Nakanishi
- Hiroshi Koizumi as Professor Shunsuke Miura
- Yū Fujiki as Jiro Nakamura
- Emi and Yumi Itō as the Shobijin
- Kenji Sahara as Jiro Torahata
- Jun Tazaki as Maruta
- Yoshifumi Tajima as Kumayama
- Akira Tani as Amimoto, the village leader
- Ikio Sawamura as a kannushi
- Haruo Nakajima as Godzilla
- Katsumi Tezuka as Godzilla

Cast taken from Japan's Favorite Mon-Star, except where cited otherwise.

== Themes ==
The film historian Steve Ryfle calls Mothra vs. Godzilla a "classic good-versus-evil stand-off". He says the film raises philosophical questions about unity and humanity's will to put aside their differences for the greater good. Ryfle refers to Godzilla as a "specter of nuclear annihilation", metaphorically casting its shadow over Japan. Ryfle also describes Godzilla as a symbol of moral judgement after indirectly killing the film's villains. The director Ishirō Honda had directed the original Godzilla (1954) and Mothra (1961) films, and the actor Hiroshi Koizumi said Honda was able to emphasize his themes better through Mothra than Godzilla, stating, "Mothra's role was a messenger of peace". Kenji Sahara said his character Torahata symbolized greed. Honda purposely chose to portray the film's version of Infant Island as a partial wasteland as a way to "visualize the terror and the power of the atomic bomb".

The film historian David Kalat writes that the film brings the shame of civilized man to the forefront, and says that the film's Japanese characters do little to nothing to return Mothra's egg yet travel to Infant Island to ask Mothra for more. Kalat writes that Mothra is the first to respond to Sakai's speech about the brotherhood between mankind, adding that Mothra "possesses a more developed faculty of forgiveness than her subjects," thus making Mothra "morally and spiritually superior" than humans.

== Production ==
=== Crew ===
- Ishirō Honda (Note: Credited as "Inoshiro Honda" in the American version of the film.) – director
- Eiji Tsuburaya – special effects director
- Kōji Kajita – assistant director
- Boku Norimoto – production coordinator
- Sadamasa Arikawa – special effects photography
- Akira Watanabe – special effects art director
- Takeo Kita – art director
- Hiroshi Mukoyama – optical effects

Personnel taken from Japan's Favorite Mon-Star.

=== Development ===
After having success with King Kong vs. Godzilla (1962), Toho Co., Ltd. wanted to pair Godzilla with another popular monster and chose Mothra, following the success of her debut film in 1961. Honda and Toho aimed the film towards a general audience due to the rise of television at the time. To prepare for his role, Sahara spent time around "pushy" real-estate agents by posing as a buyer. Tanaka cast the twin sisters Emi and Yumi Itō as the Shobijin due to their popularity as the singing duo The Peanuts, as this would create publicity for the film.

The story in Mothra vs. Godzilla was originally intended to pick up after Mothra, with the Rolisicans, the fictional people of the fictional country Rolisica, re-cast as the villains. The screenwriter Shinichi Sekizawa's earlier drafts have several key differences from the final version: the villain Torahata did not exist; Sakai was accompanied by two scientists, a colleague and a friend's mentor; Godzilla's body washes ashore rather than Mothra's egg; the leads offer themselves as hostages to the Infant Island natives in exchange for Mothra's help; Rolisica was to be attacked by Godzilla; the Frontier Missiles were to be used by the Rolisican military; Himeji Castle was to be destroyed; Godzilla was to move East until reaching close to Tokyo; The artificial lightning tactic is conceived when Godzilla is repelled by electrical towers in Tokyo; Mothra attacks Godzilla when it becomes immune to electricity; Mothra engages Godzilla in a final battle when it stalks the lead characters on a beach. Honda changed much of Sekizawa's original script to accommodate his own vision. Sakai's speech about the brotherhood of man was not in Sekizawa's script, but was later added by Honda during filming. The film marks the last time Godzilla is depicted as the antagonist during the franchise's Shōwa era.

=== Music ===
The film score was composed by Akira Ifukube. Ifukube adapted elements from Yuji Koseki's "Song of Mothra" theme from the 1961 film into his score. Honda and Ifukube were regular collaborators and held planning sessions to discuss which scenes would feature music. They had a disagreement over a scene which featured Godzilla rising behind a ridge-line. Honda asked for aggressive music for the scene but Ifukube refused, feeling that it was unnecessary due to Godzilla being "impressive enough". Godzilla's theme was eventually added to the scene, which upset Ifukube. The track "The Sacred Springs" was the only track Ifukube wrote for The Peanuts and was intended to lament Infant Island's destruction. For the 1980 re-release, the Japanese pop and rock band Talizman recorded a new song simply titled "Godzilla", which was later included as a bonus feature on Toho's 2014 Blu-ray.

=== Special effects ===
Mothra vs. Godzilla's special effects were directed by Eiji Tsuburaya. Teruyoshi Nakano served as the assistant special effects director. Mechanical props and puppets were built for both monsters. The Godzilla suit was constructed by Teizo Toshimitsu two months prior to filming, with input from the actor Haruo Nakajima whenever he visited the workshop. The new suit was lighter than previous ones and allowed Nakajima to make more fluid movement. Reinforced heels gave Nakajima freedom to roll and flip without losing his footing. The 1962 Godzilla suit was recycled for water scenes and a shot with Godzilla tumbling off a cliff. For Mothra, a new prop was built, similar to the 1961 prop, with Y-shaped braces attached to the back that allowed the wings to flap. High-powered fans were used to create wind for Mothra's wings. The wing-span for the new Mothra prop was 15 feet. Mechanisms were added that allowed the prop's head and legs to move via remote control.

The larvae were a combination of hand puppetry and motor-driven mechanical props. The larvae's web was made of liquified polystyrene. When the web was shot off-screen, it was poured onto a cup stationed at the center of a heavy industrial fan. The cup was sealed with small gaps around the edges. To shoot the web out of the larvae's mouths, compressed air was run into a sealed tube of liquid polystyrene. At a high pressure level, the liquid polystyrene was forced through a tube that ran through the back of the larvae and into nozzles in their mouths. As long as the nozzle was small, the solution vaporized when first emitted and solidified into the web. Gasoline had to be used to remove the webbing and the suit had to be thoroughly dried to prevent it from combusting.

The larva movements were designed by Soujiro Iijima and used a conveyor belt with rotating gears that allowed the bodies to move up and down. For the scenes with the Shobijin, furniture eight times their size was built to make the Shobijin appear to be 30 centimeters tall. Honda originally intended to depict the wasteland part of Infant Island with more realism and graphic imagery but this idea was dropped due to budgetary issues with the art department. Honda later regretted this decision, saying he should have been more stubborn.

Tsuburaya had Toho purchase an Oxberry 1900 optical printer which was used to remove damages in composite photography shots. The optical printer was also used to create Godzilla's atomic breath. For a scene where Godzilla destroys Nagoya Castle, Nakajima was unable to completely destroy the model of the castle. He attempted to salvage the shot by having Godzilla appear enraged by the Castle's strong fortification, but the filmmakers chose to re-shoot the scene with a rebuilt model designed to crumble more easily. For a scene where Mothra drags Godzilla by the tail, the Godzilla suit was used for medium shots and a prop used for long shots. A sequence featuring the United States military attacking Godzilla with frontier missiles was filmed for the American market, but omitted in the Japanese version of the film.

The Mothra prop used for the New Kirk City scenes in Mothra was recycled for the Infant Island scenes. This prop was smaller compared to the prop built for the new film's adult Mothra. The 1961 model had a motor built into it that flapped the wings at a rapid pace. For the scenes with Godzilla near the cliff face, part of the set's support structure was hidden by using matte painting. The miniature tanks used in the film were purchased from Ihara models rather than typically custom built. The tank models were built to a 1/15th scale and were constructed from aluminum. The antennas were used for remote control.

For the scene where Godzilla destroys the incubator, the scene proved difficult for Nakajima and the wire staff, which required coordination. Close ups of the tail were done with a prop that was operated by two people due to the heavy weight of the tail. The scenes with Godzilla thrashing wildly at Mothra were shot at high speed, then projected at a quicker speed. The end results have been compared to the movement of stop-motion animation. The scene with Godzilla thrashing from the nets was shot with different cameras at once and as a result, the same scene plays over from different angles.

A second egg was produced for the hatching scene. A styrofoam egg was molded and a calcium carbonate substance was mixed with glue and added on top. The styrofoam egg was removed from its interior with a heated wire, which left a hollow form. For the opening typhoon scene, Iijima built a shallow water tank to create the illusion of violent waves. Wider water scenes were filmed at a massive pool at Toho's studios.

Rubber glue was blown onto Godzilla's suit by an electric fan for the scene where Mothra's larvae entrap him in silk. In the process of filming, the rubber glue hardened, making it difficult to remove afterwards.

== Release ==
=== Theatrical ===
Mothra vs. Godzilla was released in Japan by Toho on April 29, 1964, as a double feature with Operation Anti Hell. Prior to the Golden Week, it sold 3.5 million tickets. According to Henry G. Saperstein, the film grossed $217,000 for three weeks from eight theaters in Tokyo. In 1970, a heavily re-edited version was screened at the Toho Champion Festival, a children's festival centered on marathon screenings of kaiju films and cartoons. The Champion Festival version was edited by Honda, and runs 74 minutes. The Champion Festival release sold 730,000 tickets. In 1980, the film was theatrically re-released in Japan as a double feature with Doraemon: Nobita's Dinosaur. An entirely new poster featuring an illustration of Godzilla by Japanese manga artist Leiji Matsumoto was designed for the 1980 re-release. It sold three million tickets (¥2.33 billion), totaling 7.22 million tickets sold in Japan.

=== American version ===
American theatrical release poster by Reynold Brown. The American version makes minimal cuts and is mostly faithful to the Japanese version; it also includes an additional sequence of the U.S. military launching missiles at Godzilla.

In May 1964, Henry G. Saperstein acquired the American theatrical and television rights to the film, under the proposed working title Godzilla vs. the Giant Moth, and sold the rights to American International Pictures (AIP). AIP released the film as Godzilla vs. the Thing on August 26, 1964, when it premiered in Los Angeles. AIP chose the title Godzilla vs. the Thing purposely to generate curiosity and anticipation for Godzilla's foe. AIP hired Reynold Brown to create a poster that featured Godzilla, but censored the other monster. Brown was paid $350 for his services.

For the American release, Toho filmed a sequence where the U.S. military help Japan against Godzilla via Frontier Missiles. The American version also made minor adjustments: the Shobijin song on Infant Island was shortened as was a scene where Sakai, Junko Miura and Makamura wave goodbye to the Mothras swimming home. Removed scenes include one of Kumayama handing out leaflets to attract visitors to the giant egg incubator and one where Torahata shoots Kumayama in a hotel room. The American release of the film was double-billed with Voyage to the End of the Universe. Titra Studios dubbed the film into English.

=== Critical response ===
On the review aggregator website Rotten Tomatoes, 92% of 13 critics' reviews are positive, with an average rating of 6.8/10.

A 1964 review for Kinema Junpo praised the effects but criticized the military attacking Godzilla, writing, "It's strange that the people don't learn from the past. From the Self-Defense Forces on down, every single person just plain looks stupid." In a contemporary review from the Monthly Film Bulletin, the critic wrote that "In spite of some clumsy model shots, Godzilla's fight with the giant moth and its caterpillar progeny is one of Toho's better efforts". The critic praised Godzilla's design in the film and wrote that the "ineffectual attempts to bring him to a halt are cleverly and spectacularly staged. Unfortunately, nothing else quite matches the special effects", writing that the plot is "ridiculous" and the acting "lamentable, and the two miniature twins' habit of repeating every line of dialogue simultaneously is intensely irksome".

Reviewing the American version, Variety said it was "long on special effect" and lacked "appeal for general trade", and that "in spite of the slick production, the story and acting don't offer enough to attract large general audiences". The review said that the "virtually all-Japanese cast, with unfamiliar faces and broad emoting typical of such Japanese pics, also detracts from general appeal". The review said that Honda's direction and the script "keep story moving at lively pace, building up to tense climactic scenes" and that Tsuburaya "labored mightily to cook up monsters and their battles, the tiny twins and the military assaults against Godzilla".

In 1998, Ryfle praised Mothra vs. Godzilla as it stood "indisputably as the greatest of all the Godzilla sequels, with a fast-paced story and likable characters, the most impressive Godzilla design ever, two of the Big G's most spectacular battles, and an abundance of special-effects "money shots" that evoke the thrills of the 1954 original." In 2017, Ryfle and Godziszewski gave their impression that "[t]he final twenty-plus minutes hint at the genre's impending tilt toward young boys. It's a near nonstop barrage of military hardware and monster action", and added that "Honda seemed to know that kids were now rooting for Godzilla, and so the film never gets too scary".

In his 2007 audio commentary, Ryfle praised the English dubbing for the American version, saying that it is one of the reasons that the film is considered amongst the best Godzilla films. Ryfle said that the English script was "snappy" and "well written" and that the voice performances sounded sincere and pulled with effort, stating, "You'd be hard pressed to find another movie where the dubbing is done as well as it is here." Reviewing the American version in 2017, the film critic Leonard Maltin gave it two and a half out of a possible four stars, praising the "vivid" special effects, which he called the highlight of the film.

Den of Geek ranked Mothra vs. Godzilla at number three in their 2019 ranking of the Shōwa Godzilla films, writing that the film has an "intelligent script that brings together mythology and modern sociopolitical themes is married to some of the best monster action in the series." Screen Rant ranked it at number three on their list of the "Best Kaiju Movies Featuring Mothra", calling the film a "kaiju classic" and a "great time overall" despite a lackluster final battle. Collider ranked the film number three on their Shōwa Godzilla list in 2022, calling the Godzilla suit an "impressive figure", the marionette work and puppeteering done with Mothra and the larvae as "impressive", and describing the battles as the "most unique" in the series.

== Home media ==
=== Japan ===
In 1983, the Japanese version of Mothra vs. Godzilla was released on VHS in Japan by Toho, followed by a LaserDisc release in 1986. The Champion Festival cut was given a LaserDisc release in 1992, and the American version was included on a LaserDisc combo pack the following year. Toho released the film on DVD in 2003, and later included the film, along with the rest of the Godzilla films, on the Godzilla Final Box DVD Set in 2005. The film was included along with Godzilla (1954), Godzilla Raids Again (1955), and King Kong vs. Godzilla (1962) on the Godzilla DVD Collection I, released by Toho on January 25, 2008. In 2010, Toho released the film on Blu-ray.

In 2008, Toho remastered the film in High-definition and premiered it on the Japanese Movie Speciality Channel, along with the rest of the Godzilla films also remastered in HD. In 2021, Toho premiered a 4K remaster of the film on the Nippon Classic Movie Channel, along with seven other Godzilla films also remastered in 4K. The film was downscaled to 2K for broadcast.

=== United States ===
In 1989, the American version was released on VHS in North America by Paramount Home Video under the title Godzilla vs. Mothra. In 1998, Simitar Video reissued the American version on VHS and DVD, which included a widescreen edition. This release retained the previous title Godzilla vs. Mothra, however, the widescreen side of the DVD featured the original American print with the title Godzilla vs. The Thing. In 2002, Sony Music Entertainment released a pan-and-scan version of the American version on DVD. This release also retained the previous title, Godzilla vs. Mothra.

In 2007, Classic Media released both the Japanese and American versions on a single disc DVD in North America. The special features include an audio commentary by film historians Steve Ryfle and Ed Godziszewski, a featurette on Akira Ifukube's life and career by Godziszewski and Bill Gudmundson, a slideshow, and the film's theatrical trailer. In 2017, Janus Films and The Criterion Collection acquired the film, as well as other Godzilla titles, to stream on Starz and FilmStruck. In 2019, the Japanese version was included in a Blu-ray box set released by the Criterion Collection, which included all 15 films from the franchise's 1954–1975 Shōwa era. In May 2020, the Japanese version became available on HBO Max upon its launch.
