= Kenji Sahara =

Japanese actor (born 1932)

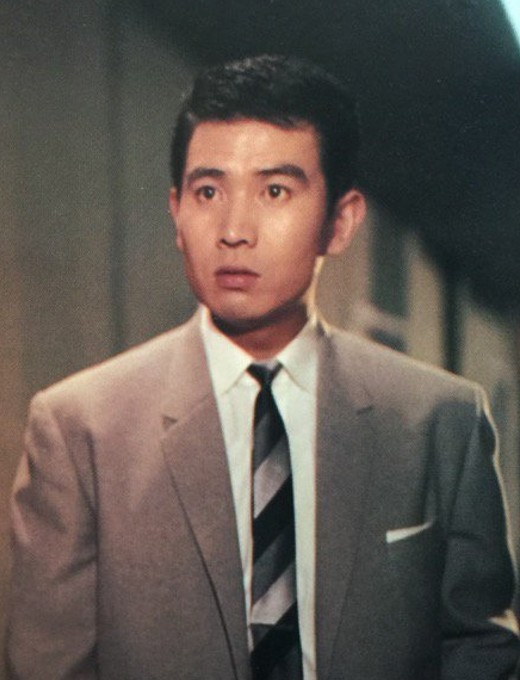
- Sahara on the set of King Kong vs. Godzilla (1962)
- Born: Masayoshi Kato; 14 May 1932 (age 94); Kawasaki City, Kanagawa, Japan
- Other names: Tadashi Ishihara, Jun Manjōme
- Occupation: Actor
- Years active: 1953–2013
- Spouse: Mieko Kato (m. 1964)

Kenji Sahara (佐原 健二, Sahara Kenji; born 14 May 1932) is a Japanese retired actor. He was born in Kawasaki City, Kanagawa as Masayoshi Kato (加藤 正好, Katō Masayoshi). Initially, Sahara used the professional name Tadashi Ishihara before changing it when he secured the lead role in Rodan (1956).

== Selected filmography ==
Sahara did a lot of work for the Toho Company, the studio that so far has produced 28 Godzilla movies. He appeared in more of the Godzilla series than any other actor.

Also, he is the actor who was often relied on in most of the films by Directors Ishiro Honda and Eiji Tsuburaya.

He has appeared in many supporting roles.

Sahara is famous as a mainstay of Toho special-effects movies and the Ultraman series.

- Farewell Rabaul (1954)
- Godzilla (1954) – as Young Lover on the Sound
- Yuki No Koi (1955) – (credited as Tadashi Ishihara)
- Seifuku No Otome Tachi (1955) – as Hideya Fujiwara (credited as Tadashi Ishihara)
- Aoi Me (1956) – as Jirô Hayashi (credited as Tadashi Ishihara)
- Street of Shame (1956)
- Godzilla, King of the Monsters! (1956) – as Man on Boat
- Norihei No Daigaku (1956) – (credited as Tadashi Ishihara)
- People of Tokyo, Goodbye (1956) – (credited as Tadashi Ishihara)
- Rodan (1956) – as Shigeru Kawamura (credited as Kenji Sawara)
- Yoru no kamome (1957)
- Meshiro Sanpei monogatari (1957) – as Otsuka
- Zoku Sazae-san (1957)
- Hikage no musume (1957)
- Daigaku no samurai tachi (1957) – as Yamada
- The Mysterians (1957) – as Joji Atsumi
- Song for a Bride (1958)
- The Badger Palace (1958)
- Kiuchi yasuto (1958)
- Anzukko (1958)
- The H-Man (1958) – as Dr. Masada
- The Young Beast (1958)
- Zokuzoku salaryman shussetai koki (1958)
- Josei S.O.S. (1958)
- Otona niwa wakaranai: Seishun hakusho (1958)
- Salaryman jikkai (1959)
- Onna gokoro (1959)
- Gokigen musume (1959)
- Mothra (1961) as Helicopter Pilot
- Gorath (1962) as Saiki, Vice Captain of Ôtori
- King Kong vs. Godzilla (1962) as Kazuo Fujita
- Matango (1963) as Senzō Koyama
- Atragon (1963) as Umino, Journalist/Mu Agent
- Mothra vs. Godzilla (1964) as Jiro Torahata, a corrupt business tycoon
- Ghidorah, the Three-Headed Monster (1964)
- Frankenstein Conquers the World (1965) as a Soldier
- None but the Brave (1965) as Cpl. Fujimoto
- War of the Gargantuas (1966) as Dr. Yuzo Majida
- Son of Godzilla (1967) as Morio
- Destroy All Monsters (1968) as Nishikawa, Moon Base Commander
- All Monsters Attack (1969) as Kenichi Mitsuki
- Space Amoeba (1970) as Makoto Obata
- Kage Gari Hoero Taihō (1972)
- Godzilla vs. Mechagodzilla (1974) as Ship Captain
- Karafuto 1945 Summer Hyosetsu no mon (1974) as Toshikazu Okaya
- Terror of Mechagodzilla (1975) as General Segawa
- Godzilla vs. King Ghidorah (1991) as Minister Takayuki Segawa
- Godzilla vs. Mechagodzilla II (1993) as Minister Takayuki Segawa
- Godzilla vs. SpaceGodzilla (1994) as Minister Takayuki Segawa
- Hitman (1998) as Tsukamoto, a sleazy and notorious ex-yakuza boss who is assassinated by the King of Killers at the beginning of the film
- Godzilla: Final Wars (2004) as Hachiro Jinguji

Sahara was also the lead in the first of the Ultra series, Ultra Q. He also appeared in a number of subsequent Ultra series, including:

- Ultra Q (1966)- as Jun Manjoume
- Ultra Seven (1967–1968) - as Takenaka Jinguji
- Return of Ultraman (1971–1972) - as Takenaka Jinguji
- Ultraman 80 (1980–1981) - as Dr. Jono
- Ultraman Nexus (2004–2005) - as Togo
- Ultraman Mebius (2006–2007) - as Takenaka Jinguji

His latest Ultraman appearance was in the 2008 Ultraman movie, Superior Ultraman 8 Brothers. He also made a cameo in episodes 47 and 48 of Sonic X, being the voice of Dr. Atsumi.
