= The Peanuts =

Japanese vocal group

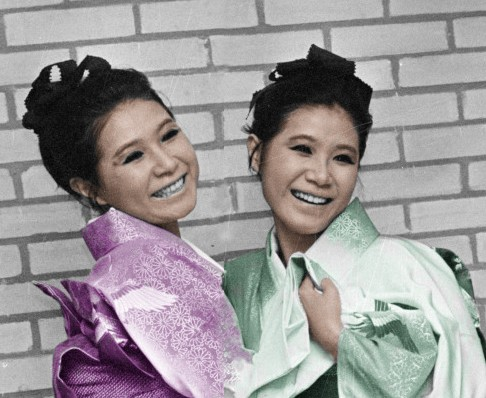
- The Peanuts (Emi (left) and Yumi (right)) in October 1966

Background information
- Born: 1 April 1941; Tokoname, Aichi Prefecture, Japan
- Origin: Japan
- Died: Emi Itō: June 15, 2012 (aged 71); Yumi Itō: May 18, 2016 (aged 75)
- Genre: Kayōkyoku
- Occupations: singers, actresses
- Instrument: Voice
- Years active: 1958–1975
- Label: King Records
- Past members: Emi Itō; Yumi Itō

The Peanuts (ザ・ピーナッツ, Za Pīnattsu) were a Japanese vocal duo comprising the twin sisters Emi (伊藤エミ, Itō Emi) and Yumi Itō (伊藤ユミ, Itō Yumi). They were born in Nagoya on April 1, 1941. Their voices were close in timbre, which resulted in their singing together sounding like a solo artist using double tracking or reverb.

== Early life ==
Emi and Yumi were born identical twins to Hideyo and Tsukiko Ito on Tuesday April 1, 1941 in the city of Tokoname in Aichi Prefecture. Emi was older than her twin sister Yumi.

== Career ==
While in high school, the twins performed at a Nagoya night club as the Ito Sisters, and were discovered by Watanabe Productions founder Shin Watanabe. They were brought to Tokyo in 1958, where they became the first clients for Watanabe Productions. In 1959, the Peanuts became a hit at the Nichigeki theater. That same year, they released their first recording, "Kawaii Hana" ("Cute Flower"). In their early years they sang Japanese covers of standards, foreign hits, and Japanese folk songs. Then they began singing originals, written by their producer, Hiroshi Miyagawa, and such songwriters as Koichi Sugiyama and Rei Nakanishi. They were the first to perform "Koi no Vacance".

The twins embarked on a brief acting career appearing as Mothra's twin fairy priestesses, known as the Shobijin, in the 1961 film Mothra, and the 1964 films Mothra vs. Godzilla and Ghidorah, the Three-Headed Monster. In the audio commentary for the DVD of Mothra vs. Godzilla, the director, Ishirō Honda, recalled the Itos' professionalism. Though not primarily actresses, the twins were surprisingly skilled, learned their lines without trouble, and always worked on time, despite their busy schedule.

Emi had a mole near her left eye. To preserve their image as identical, Yumi would have a mole drawn near her left eye.

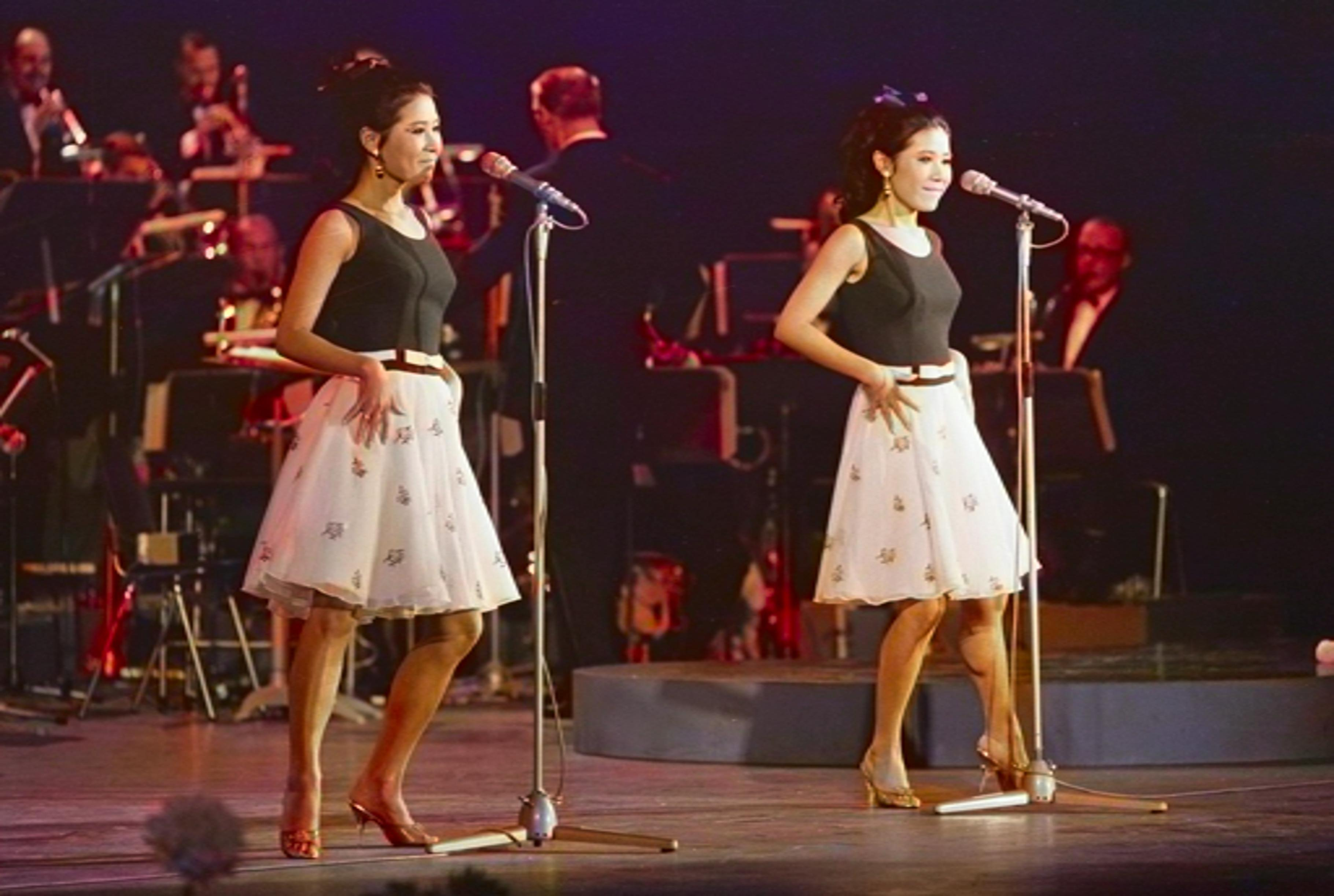
The Peanuts on stage in 1966

=== Foreign performances ===
They appeared in the United States on The Ed Sullivan Show on April 3, 1966, performing "Lover Come Back to Me". Unusual for Japanese singers at the time, the duo had success in Germany, as well as in Austria. In 1963 Caterina Valente was in Japan where the duo caught her attention. Valente invited them to Germany. On the occasion of the 1964 Summer Olympics in Tokyo, Michael Pfleghar produced the opening ceremonies, where both were also invited, and the musical director Heinz Kiessling produced German-language recordings with them, including "Souvenirs from Tokyo". In 1965, Pfleghar cast them in two other shows "The Smile in the West" and "Schlager-Festspiele". In total, they released eight singles in the German language between 1964 and 1967. In 1965 "Souvenirs from Tokyo" reached No. 18 on the Austrian charts and spent 2 weeks at No. 40 on the German Billboard charts. In 1967 "Bye, Bye Yokohama" spent 4 weeks on the Germany charts, rising to No. 30. In 1966, the duo also performed at the Olympia in Paris.

== Retirement and death ==
The pair retired from performing in April 1975, with a farewell concert tour running from March 21st-April 5th 1975, after Emi married fellow Nabepro star Kenji Sawada and they had a son. Emi and Kenji eventually divorced in 1987. After retiring from music, Yumi went on to start another career in fashion design, but never married. The duo is remembered most for its versions of European songs and for a handful of Japanese pop songs, such as "Furimukanaide" ("Don't Turn Around"). Emi Itō died from cancer on June 15, 2012, at the age of 71. Yumi died on May 18, 2016, at the age of 75.

== Discography ==
- 可愛いピーナッツ (Cute Peanuts) (1959)
- ピーナッツ民謡お国めぐり (Peanut Folk Song Country Tour) (1960)
- ヒットパレード (The Hit Parade) (1960)
- 夢で会いましょう (I'll See You in My Dreams) (1961)
- ヒットパレード第2巻 (The Hit Parade Vol. 2) (1962)
- ヒットパレード第3巻 (The Hit Parade Vol. 3) (1962)
- フォークソング (The Folk Songs) (1963)
- 人気の基準 (Popular Standards) (1963
- ヒットパレード (The Hit Parade) (1963)
- ヒットパレード第4巻 (The Hit Parade Vol. 4) (1964)
- ヒットパレード第5巻 (The Hit Parade Vol. 5) (1964)
- ヒットパレード第6巻 (The Hit Parade Vol. 6) (1965)
- Souvenirs aus Tokio (1965)
- ヒットパレード第6巻 – ヨーロッパ周辺 (The Hit Parade Vol. 6 – Around Europe) (1966)
- ザ・ピーナッツ・デラックス (The Peanuts Deluxe) (1967)
- ゴールデンデラックス (Golden Deluxe) (1968)
- フィーリング・グッド – ピーナッツの新しい次元 (Feelin' Good – New Dimension of the Peanuts) (1970)
- ザ・ピーナッツ・ダブル・デラックス (The Peanuts Double Deluxe) (1971)
- ザ・ピーナッツ・ベスト・アルバム (The Peanuts Best Album) (1971)
- 華麗なるフランシス・レイ・サウンド ザ･ピーナッツ最新映画主題歌を歌う (Brilliant Frances Ray Sound – The Peanuts Sing the Latest Movie Theme Song) (1971)
- 世界の女たち (Women in the world) (1972)
- スーパーディスク 20 Superdisc 20 (1972)
- ザ・ピーナッツ・オン・ステージ (The Peanuts On Stage) (1972)
- ザ・ピーナッツ・ベスト20/指輪のあとに (The Peanuts Best 20/After the Ring) (1973)
- 情熱の砂漠 (Passion Desert) (1973)
- スーパーディスク 20 (Superdisc 20) (1973)
- 気になる噂/ベスト・オブ・ザ・ピーナッツ (ki ni naru uwasa/Best Of The Peanuts) (1974)
- ザ・ピーナッツベスト20 (The Peanuts Best 20) (1974)
- 永遠の (Eternal!) (1975)
- ザ・ピーナッツ・ベスト20 (The Peanuts – Best 20) (1975)
- ザ・ピーナッツ (Big Star Series – The Peanuts) (1976)
- ザ・ピーナッツ (Big Star W Series – The Peanuts) (1977)
- ピーナッツオリジナル (The Peanuts Original) (1978)
- ピーナッツポップス (The Peanuts Pops) (1978)
- ピーナッツラブ (The Peanuts Love) (1978)
- ベストスターWデラックス (Best Star W Deluxe) (1979)
- スーパースター・ベスト・アルバム ザ・ピーナッツ (Super Star Best Album – The Peanuts) (1979)
- 記念碑 (Monument) (1980)
- ザ・ピーナッツ・ベスト (The Peanuts Best) (1980)
- ピーナッツの歴史第一巻 (The Peanuts History Vol. 1) (1983)
- ピーナッツの歴史2巻 (The Peanuts History Vol. 2) (1983)
- ザ・ピーナッツ・ベスト (The Peanuts Best) (1984)
- ザ・ピーナッツ・オン・ステージ (The Peanuts On Stage) (1984)
- ザ・ピーナッツ・ベスト・アルバム (The Peanuts Best Album) (1985)
- D.C.恋のフーガ (D.C. koi no fuuga) (1987)
- D.C. (Retro) (1988)

== Kōhaku Uta Gassen appearances ==
Kōhaku Uta Gassen is an annual New Year's Eve television special produced by Japanese public broadcaster NHK.

Year	#	Song	No.	VS	Remarks
1959 (Showa 34)/10th	1	Jounetsu No Hana (情熱の花)	7/25	Hiroshi Wada & Mahina Stars	
1960 (Showa 35)/11th	2	Kanashiki Juurokusai (悲しき16才)	11/27	Hiroshi Wada & Mahina Stars (2)	
1961 (Showa 36)/12th	3	Suku Suku (スク・スク)	19/25	Dark Ducks	
1962 (Showa 37)/13th	4	Furimukanaide (ふりむかないで)	5/25	Dark Ducks (2)	
1963 (Showa 38)/14th	5	Koi No Vacation (恋のバカンス)	22/25	Duke Aces	
1964 (Showa 39)/15th	6	Una Sera Di Tokyo (ウナ・セラ・ディ東京)	24/25	Kyu Sakamoto	Second Finale
1965 (Showa 40)/16th	7	Rock And Roll Music (ロック・アンド・ロール・ミュージック)	21/25	Duke Aces (2)	
1966 (Showa 41)/17th	8	Rome No Ame (ローマの雨)	16/25	Jackey Yoshikawa and His Blue Comets	
1967 (Showa 42)/18th	9	Koi No Fugue (恋のフーガ)	22/23	Ai Jyoji	Second Finale (2)
1968 (Showa 43)/19th	10	Glass No Shiro (ガラスの城)	6/23	Teruhiko Saigō	
1969 (Showa 44)/20th	11	Una Sera Di Tokyo (2)	20/23	Frank Nagai	
1970 (Showa 45)/21st	12	Tokyo No Hito (東京の女)	3/24	Nomura Masaki	
1971 (Showa 46)/22nd	13	San Francisco No Hito (サンフランシスコの女)	18/25	Masaaki Sakai	
1972 (Showa 47)/23rd	14	Sayonara Wa Totsuzenni (さよならは突然に)	11/23	Billy BanBan	
1973 (Showa 48)/24th	15	Una Sera Di Tokyo (3)	12/22	Tsunehiko Kamijō	
1974 (Showa 49)/25th	16	Boogie Woogie Bugle Boy (ブギウギ・ビューグル・ボーイ)	20/25	Akira Fuse	
