= Mothra (film) =

1961 film directed by Ishirō Honda

- Theatrical release poster

Japanese name
- Katakana: モスラ
Transcriptions
- Revised Hepburn: Mosura
- Directed by: Ishirō Honda
- Screenplay by: Shinichi Sekizawa
- Based on: The Luminous Fairies and Mothra by Shin'ichirō Nakamura; Takehiko Fukunaga; Yoshie Hotta
- Produced by: Tomoyuki Tanaka
- Starring: Frankie Sakai; Hiroshi Koizumi; Kyōko Kagawa; The Peanuts
- Cinematography: Hajime Koizumi
- Edited by: Ichiji Taira
- Music by: Yūji Koseki
- Production company: Toho Co., Ltd
- Distributed by: Toho
- Release date: July 30, 1961 (Japan)
- Running time: 101 minutes
- Country: Japan
- Languages: Japanese; English
- Budget: ¥200,000,000 (equivalent to ¥1,175,932,446 in 2024)

Mothra (Japanese: モスラ, Hepburn: Mosura) is a 1961 Japanese kaiju film directed by Ishirō Honda, with special effects by Eiji Tsuburaya. Produced and distributed by Toho Co., Ltd, it is the first film in the Mothra franchise. The film stars Frankie Sakai, Hiroshi Koizumi, Kyōko Kagawa, Jerry Ito, and The Peanuts. In the film, an expedition to an irradiated island brings civilization in contact with a primitive native culture. When one sensationalist entrepreneur abducts two doll-sized priestesses for exploitation, their ancient deity, known as Mothra, arises in retaliation.

In 1960, producer Tomoyuki Tanaka hired Shin'ichirō Nakamura to write an original story for a new kaiju film. Co-written with Takehiko Fukunaga, and Yoshie Hotta, The Luminous Fairies and Mothra was serialized in a magazine in January 1961. Screenwriter Shinichi Sekizawa later adapted the story into a screenplay, patterning his version after King Kong (1933) and Godzilla (1954).

Mothra was theatrically released in Japan on July 30, 1961. An edited, English dubbed version was released theatrically in the United States on May 10, 1962, by Columbia Pictures. The titular monster, Mothra, would become Toho's second most popular kaiju character after Godzilla, appearing in eleven Godzilla films and her own trilogy in the 1990s.

== Plot ==
In waters off Infant Island, a presumed uninhabited site for atomic tests of the Eurasian country Rolisica, a ship is caught and run aground in the turbulence of a typhoon. A rescue party following the storm finds four sailors alive and strangely unafflicted with radiation sickness, which they attribute to the juice provided to them by the island natives. The story is broken by tenacious reporter Zenichiro Fukuda and photographer Michi Hanamura, who infiltrate the hospital examining the survivors.

The Rolisican embassy responds by co-sponsoring a joint Japanese–Rolisican scientific expedition to Infant Island, led by business magnate Clark Nelson. Also on the expedition are radiation specialist Dr. Harada, linguist/anthropologist Shinichi Chujo, and stowaway reporter Fukuda. Chujo has studied the cultures of islands in the area and ascertained that one of the key hieroglyphs in their written language, a radiant cross-shaped star, translates as Mothra. There the team discover a vast jungle of mutated flora, a fleeing native tribe, and two young women only twelve inches tall, who save Chujo from being eaten by a vampire plant. The "Shobijin", as Fukuda dubs them, wish their island to be spared further atomic testing. Acknowledging this message, the team returns and conceals these events from the public.

Nelson, however, returns to the island with a crew of henchmen and abducts the Shobijin, gunning down several natives who try to save them. While Nelson profits off a "Secret Fairies Show" in Tokyo featuring the Shobijin singing, both they and the island natives beseech their goddess Mothra, then in the form of a giant egg, for help. Fukuda, Hanamura, and Chujo communicate with the Shobijin via telepathy; they express conviction that Mothra will come to their aid and warn that "good people are sure to be hurt". Fukuda's newspaper has accused Nelson of holding the Shobijin against their will; Nelson denies the charge and files a libel suit against the paper. Meanwhile, at Infant Island, Mothra in her larval form hatches from the egg and begins swimming toward Japan. During the escort, she destroys a cruise ship and survives a napalm attack on a beeline path for Tokyo. The Rolisican Embassy, however, defends Nelson's property rights over the Shobijin, ignoring any connection to Mothra.

Mothra arrives at Tokyo, impervious to the barrage of weaponry directed at her, and builds a cocoon in the ruins of Tokyo Tower. Public feeling turns against Nelson, and he is ordered to release the Shobijin. As Nelson flees incognito to Rolisica with the Shobijin concealed in a suitcase, Mothra metamorphoses into her imago form and flies to New Kirk City, the capital of Rolisica. While the police scour New Kirk for Nelson and Mothra lays waste to the metropolis, Nelson attempts to flee the city, but he is recognized by civilians and killed in the resultant shootout with police. The Shobijin are assigned to Chujo's care.

Chujo and Hanamura are reminded of Mothra's unique symbol and of the Shobijin's voices by the steeple cross and ringing bells of a church. At Chujo's suggestion, numerous other church bells are rung simultaneously in order to attract Mothra to the runway of New Kirk airport, on which Mothra's symbol has been painted. The Shobijin are returned and Mothra flies them back to Infant Island.

== Cast ==
- Frankie Sakai as Zenichiro Fukuda
- Kyōko Kagawa as Michi Hanamura
- Hiroshi Koizumi as Dr. Shinichi Chujo
- Yumi Ito and Emi Ito as the Shobijin
- Jerry Ito as Clark Nelson
- Ken Uehara as Dr. Harada
- Takashi Shimura as Sadakatsu Amano
- Masamitsu Tayama as Shinji Chujo
- Kenji Sahara as the helicopter pilot
- Akihiko Hirata as the doctor
- Tetsu Nakamura and Osman Yusuf as Nelson's henchmen
- Robert Dunham as New Kirk City Police Chief
- Bin Furuya as Infant Island dancer
- Haruo Nakajima and Katsumi Tezuka as the Mothra larva

== Themes ==
Authors Steve Ryfle and Ed Godziszewski note that Honda treats the film's nuclear anxiety and proxy relationship between America and Japan differently. They note that Rolisica (an amalgam of Russia and America) is portrayed as a "pushy capitalist superpower" that is more concerned with Nelson's money, allowing his crimes in Japan to go unpunished. They also note that Rolisica's atomic ray gun seems to violate Japan's three non-nuclear principles. They iterate that Honda's ideal of understanding and cooperation is achieved through religion, even noting the religious-like iconography of Infant Island. However, they note that the film's political satire "never gets too serious."

Ryfle notes that some writers compared Rolisica's bombing of Infant Island to America's bombing of Hiroshima and Nagasaki and Nelson's kidnapping of the Shobijin to America's occupation and forced Westernization of Japan. Ryfle expresses that the film paints a bad portrait of Rolisica and by extension, the United States, noting that Rolisica exploits natives for atomic testing and commercial gain (via Nelson), and Nelson's press coverage restriction on the expedition is an attempt of covering up Rolisica's involvement in the bombing of Infant Island.

== Production ==
=== Crew ===
- Ishirō Honda – director, co-writer
- Eiji Tsuburaya – special effects director
- Shin Morita – production manager
- Toshio Takashima – lighting
- Takeo Kita, Teruaki Abe – chief art directors
- Akira Watanabe – special effects art director
- Kuichirō Kishida – special effects lighting
- Teizō Toshimitsu – monster builder
- Masanobu Miyazaki, Shoichi Fujinawa – sound recording

=== Development ===
During the summer of 1960, Toho president Iwao Mori and producer Tomoyuki Tanaka hired Shin'ichirō Nakamura to write an original story for a kaiju film. Nakamura collaborated with Takehiko Fukunaga and Zenei Hotta (sometimes credited as Yoshie Hotta), with each writer writing one part of the story. The story, The Luminous Fairies and Mothra, was then serialized in Weekly Asahi Extra magazine in January 1961. Tanaka contacted Sho Watanabe about casting The Peanuts in the film. Watanabe gave the twins permission to participate in the film due to being impressed with the "uniqueness" of the idea.

However, Toho had difficulty with scheduling the twins to shoot their scenes due to contractual obligations with Watanabe Productions. For the film, Honda wanted a more Disney-inspired approach, stating, "We wanted to do something that was new, for the whole family, like a Disney or Hollywood type of picture." Tanaka created the name "Mothra" by combining the Japanese word for "moth" (mosu) and the suffix "ra", taken from Godzilla's Japanese name "Gojira". Adding the suffix "ra" would become a common practice for naming monsters, not just in Toho productions (e.g. King Ghidorah, Ebirah, Hedorah), but in non-Toho Japanese productions, e.g. Gamera.

=== Writing ===
Prior to the original story being written, Toho held story meetings to discuss ideas. One of the ideas included to have Mothra emit a ray beam. While writing the original story, Nakamura chose a giant moth because he wanted a creature that underwent a transformation. Producer Tanaka later confirmed that the female perspective for the film was suggested by another producer during the early planning stages. This inspired Tanaka to come up with the idea for the Shobijin and their roles as guardian spirits of a South Seas island. The character Zen'ichirō Fukuda was named after the writers of the original story.

In the original story, Fukuda is not on the initial expedition and ventures to Infant Island alone later. The natives reveal to Fukuda the legend of Infant Island, with the mythology behind Infant Island including Christian-like overtones which feature two gods (Ajima, the God of Eternal Night and Ajiko, the Goddess of Daylight) conceiving a giant glowing egg, smaller eggs, and a pair of humans who reproduce and repopulate the island. The smaller eggs hatch caterpillars which turn into moths and fly away, which enrages Ajima to condemn all living things to death and commits suicide by tearing himself into four pieces. Heartbroken, Ajiko also commits suicide by also tearing herself into four pieces, which turn into four small, immortal fairies dedicated to serving Mothra of the giant glowing egg.

Fukuda remains on the island and is later awakened by Nelson's gunfire, witnessing Nelson kidnapping the Shobijin and the natives' ritual. Michiko was originally written as Chujo's assistant and the leader of a protest group that unsuccessfully pressures Nelson to release the Shobijin. The original story featured political parallels to a then controversial ratification of a security treaty between Japan and the United States; however, Sekizawa omitted the political backdrop in his version. The original story featured the Rolisican ambassador sending a fleet to protect Nelson and his property from Mothra.

While adapting the story for the film, screenwriter Shinichi Sekizawa picked his favorite aspects of the story and ignored everything else. Sekizawa patterned his script after the original King Kong and Godzilla films. Sekizawa felt that too much detail would confuse audiences and that it was more important to keep audiences entertained, stating, "My philosophy is to just add enough to tell the story and keep it moving along." Honda later admitted that the fantasy elements were Sekizawa's ideas while Honda was interested in the anti-nuclear themes. Originally, Hotta wanted to include an anti-discrimination message based on a person's size.

The original story featured four fairies. Sekizawa felt four was unnecessary and trimmed the members to two, feeling that two fairies was manageable. The original story had the Shobijin stand at 60 centimeters but Sekizawa felt the size was too big and would create difficulties when building the sets. One of the original ideas had one of the Shobijin fall in love with one of the leads; however, Sekizawa dropped this idea because he felt it would have required many twists and turns and would have taken time away from Mothra. Originally, Mothra was to cocoon herself on the National Diet Building but Sekizawa felt it wasn't "spectacular enough" and changed the setting to Tokyo Tower.

It was Sekizawa's decision to refer to the twins as "Shobijin" (small beauties), feeling that "small fairies from Infant Island" was too long to write. Sekizawa coined the name "Infant Island" simply because it "sounded good". In the United States, several promotional materials referred to the Shobijin as "Ailenas", despite Japanese publications and materials not using the term. Honda explained that the name originated from the original story that featured a fairy named "Ailena". The name reached the publicity department for overseas markets. Honda had originally written a scene that showed an area of the island bombed by the atomic bomb, but it was not filmed due to budget concerns.

=== Music ===
The score was composed by Yūji Koseki. Akira Ifukube — who had composed music for other kaiju films such as Godzilla, Rodan, and Varan the Unbelievable — was offered the opportunity to score the film but declined, feeling he wasn't confident enough to create music for The Peanuts. The lyrics for the Mothra theme were written in Japanese and translated into Indonesian at Tokyo University by an Indonesian exchange student. The track "The Girls of Infant Island" was released as a single in 1961 while the track "Song of Mothra" was released as a single in 1978. The track "Daughters of Infant Island" was co-written by the film's assistant director Koji Kajita.

=== Special effects ===
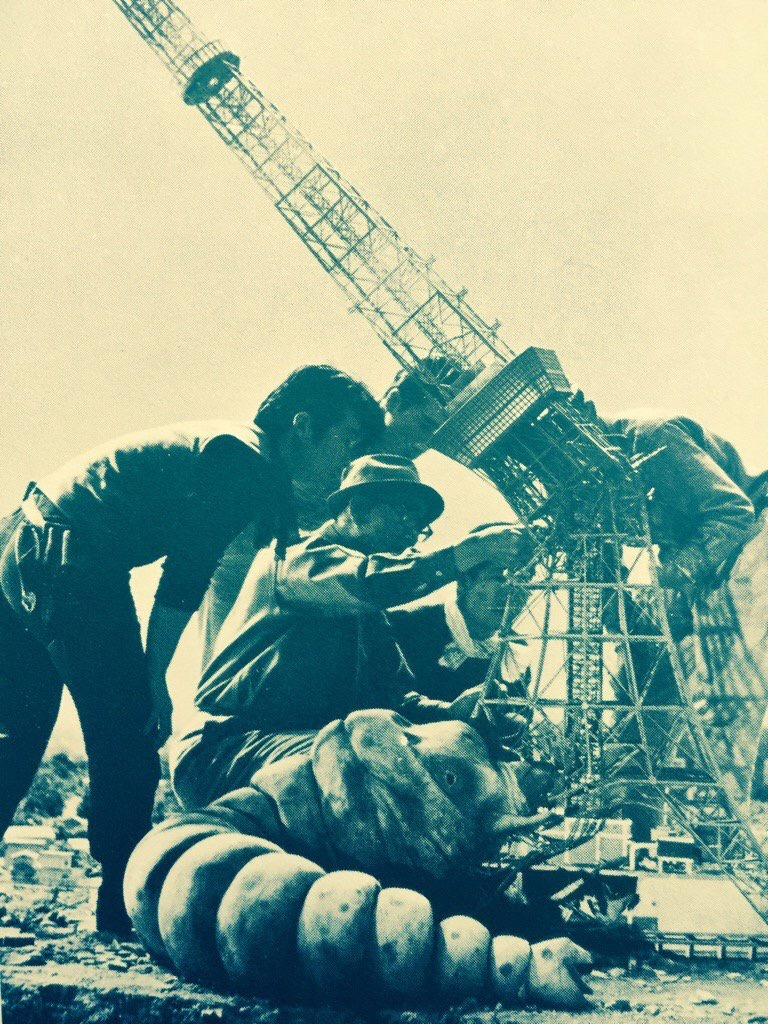
The special effects crew preparing the miniature Tokyo Tower for Mothra's attack scene.

The film's special effects were directed by Eiji Tsuburaya. The Peanuts filmed their scenes separately from the main cast. They filmed most of their scenes in front of a blue screen and oversized sets. Their scenes were later composited into the film. The Peanuts never interacted with the cast. Instead, dolls were used for the actors to interact with while a tape recorder with the Peanuts's lines was played back. New Kirk City was designed after Manhattan, Los Angeles, and San Francisco. Honda originally intended to film second unit photography in Los Angeles but due to the budget inflating because of the New Kirk City scenes, Honda had to use library footage of L.A. freeways and beach fronts instead.

Honda also intended to show how the inhabitants of Infant Island survived a nuclear blast but budget cost forced him to use a bland cave instead. Honda wanted to create a type of mold for the island and asked the art department to create it but this idea was dropped due to budget costs. The Infant Island natives were portrayed by Japanese actors in dark makeup. The live-action Dam footage was filmed in Kurobe Dam. During a production meeting, Tsuburaya told the staff he wanted four water tanks to create the raging waters that breaks the dam. Tsuburaya's Chief Assistant Art Director instead built 12 tanks, which held 4,320 gallons of water.

The dam was built at a 1/50th scale and four meters high. The miniature mountains around the dam were built with concrete to withstand the pressure of the water, a decision that upset Tsuburaya due to being unable to move the set in order to set up cameras. The dam was also designed to realistically crumble under the weight of the water but due to this, only a small amount of water came out during the first try. Three attempts were made to force the water out and the dam had to be weakened for the effect to succeed. Since Tsuburaya was unable to move the cameras, all three takes were edited together. Several props of various scales were created for the caterpillar and adult Mothra, including one caterpillar prop used specifically for water scenes.

A giant suit was produced for the caterpillar Mothra, which allowed larger sets and details to be included. The suit was the largest monster suit that Toho had ever produced. It was built at 1/25th scale, was seven meters long, and required five to six actors inside to move it. Haruo Nakajima and Katsumi Tezuka lead members of the special effects art staff inside the suit. A hand-operated model of the caterpillar was also produced. The hand model had a more narrow, oval shape than the other models and had small legs at the bottom, a feature that other models lacked.

The Tokyo Tower model was built by a metal works company. The tower model was built using blue prints by the Toho effects staff who photographed and researched the real tower. However, the blue prints only showed one side of the tower, which forced the metal works company to figure out the angles to build the other sides. The effects staff had initially requested the original blueprints of Tokyo Tower but were unable to obtain them. Toho closely guarded the custom tower model blueprints to keep competing studios from benefitting from Toho's work. Mothra's silk was created from a form of liquid Styrofoam called "expanded Polystyrene". A small model and large model was built for the atomic ray cannon.

Three different models were built for the adult Mothra, each with different functions. A mid-sized model with more flexible wings was used for the hatching scene. The mid-size model has a smaller thorax and the wingspan is shorter, compared to the other models. The large model was built in 1/100 scale with a wingspan of 2.5 meters. Due to this, the wing movement was less flexible. The eyes were lit by lightbulbs from inside the head and the eyes were constructed from clear latex. The smaller model was only used for extreme long shots of Mothra advancing on New Kirk City. To make the wings flap, the models were suspended on wires from an overhead motorized brace that would open and close. The wires were attached at the center of the wings rather than the tips, which allowed the wings to freely flap at the edges.

=== Alternate ending ===
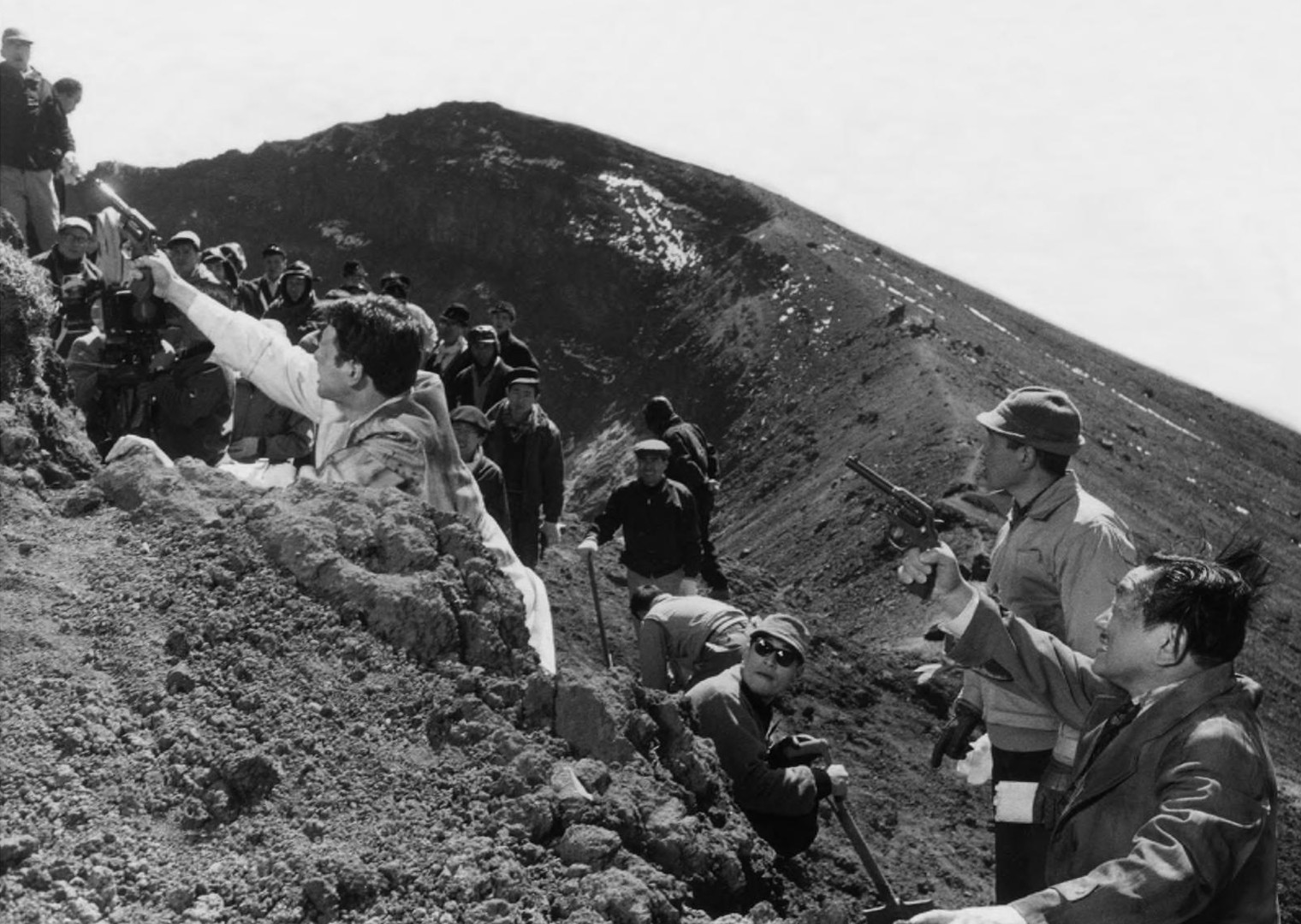
Ishirō Honda directing the unused alternative ending

Toho had deemed Mothra's attack on New Kirk City too expensive and advised Honda and Sekizawa to write a more budget friendly climax. The new ending had Nelson and his crew take Shinji hostage near a volcano, which Nelson falls into after Mothra flaps her wings. Toho's contract with Columbia Pictures stipulated that the climax needed to take place in an American-style city. Toho sent a letter to Columbia Pictures requesting approval to change the climax but rather than wait for a reply, Toho instructed Honda to proceed with principal photography as planned. The new ending was the first scene to be filmed in Kagoshima Prefecture near Mount Kirishima. However, around the same time, Columbia Pictures denied Toho's request for alterations. Surviving images of the alternate ending appeared in official publicity materials; however, the footage was never developed.

While filming the alternate ending, the Nelson dummy used to be plunged into the volcano was later found by locals, who believed it to be a suicide. Authorities retrieved the "body", which led to Honda and his crew being "roundly scolded".

== Release ==
=== Marketing ===
Columbia Pictures' trailer did not reveal Mothra and mainly focused on the Shobijin and their mysterious link to Mothra. The synopsis used for the film's American press book was based on the original story rather than the final film, with the summary referring to the Shobijin as the "Ailenas". Columbia's press book advised theater owners to add police or armed services and a weapons display in the lobby with the caption, "These weapons couldn't stop Mothra!", put signs on construction sites with the caption, "Mothra was here!", send two attractive street valley girls in abbreviated space suits through the main business district and school vicinities with signs on their backs reading, "Mothra, the world's most fantastic love story!", and arrange a display of radioactive materials with a Geiger counter in the lobby to emphasize Mothra's power.

=== Theatrical ===
Mothra was released in Japan on July 30, 1961, where it was distributed by Toho. The film was ranked 10th place in Kinema Junpo's annual box office tally. The film was released by Columbia Pictures with an English dub produced by Titra Studios on May 10, 1962. Columbia released Mothra on a double-bill with The Three Stooges in Orbit in some markets. The American version runs at 90 minutes. Columbia acquired the North American rights to the film during pre-production. The film has been re-released theatrically in Japan since its release. This includes a shorter version of the film distributed by Toho with a 62-minute running time on December 14, 1974. This version was edited by Ishiro Honda. Mothra was re-released theatrically in Japan on November 21, 1982, as part of Toho's 50th anniversary. Hiroshi Koizumi believes the success of the film was attributed to the Peanuts' involvement, due to the twins being popular at the time of the film's release.

=== Critical response ===
On review aggregator Rotten Tomatoes, the film has an approval rating of 80% based on 15 reviews, with an average rating of 5.8/10.

Film critic A. H. Weiler in The New York Times gave the film a generally positive review, singling out the color and special effects for praise. "There's that color, as pretty as can be, that now and then smites the eye with some genuinely artistic panoramas and décor designs." Hazel Flynn of the Los Angeles Citizen News stated, "the sight of the huge flying monster flapping its wings is one of the most impressive special effects I've ever encountered." Boxoffice magazine called the film "one of the best of its kind." A reviewer for Variety called the film "ludicrous" and "haphazardly executed", stating, "the post-dubbed film is too awkward in dramatic construction and crude in histrionic style to score appreciably at the box office."

=== Home media ===
In 2009, the Japanese and American versions of Mothra were released on DVD by Sony Pictures Home Entertainment through their Icons of Sci-fi: Toho Collection set. In 2019, Mill Creek Entertainment released the Japanese and American versions on a steelbook Blu-ray, under licence from Sony. A 4K remaster of the film was released on Blu-ray and 4K UHD Blu-ray in Japan on July 15, 2026.

== Legacy ==
In 1961, Frankie Sakai and a Mothra prop made a cameo appearance in Cheers, Mr. Awamori. Author Steve Ryfle notes that The Song of Mothra has become a pop culture reference, stating, "even many people who've never seen this movie seem to have heard the song." Between 1996 and 1998, Toho produced a trilogy of Mothra films, titled Rebirth of Mothra, for a family friendly audience. According to Toshio Okada, Hayao Miyazaki saw Mothra during its initial release and drew inspiration from it when creating the Nausicaä of the Valley of the Wind manga series. In an interview regarding Shin Godzilla (2016), Studio Ghibli's Toshio Suzuki said he preferred Mothra to Godzilla movies. In 2017 interviews, actor Samuel L. Jackson said he is a fan of Mothra and her debut film.

== See also ==
- List of films featuring miniature people
