= Dogora =

1964 film by Ishirō Honda

- Theatrical release poster
- Directed by: Ishirō Honda
- Written by: Jojiro Okami (story); Shinichi Sekizawa
- Produced by: Yasuyoshi Tajitsu; Tomoyuki Tanaka
- Starring: Yosuke Natsuki; Yōko Fujiyama; Hiroshi Koizumi; Nobuo Nakamura; Robert Dunham; Akiko Wakabayashi; Jun Tazaki; Susumu Fujita; Seizaburô Kawazu; Hideyo Amamoto
- Cinematography: Hajime Koizumi
- Edited by: Ryohei Fujii
- Music by: Akira Ifukube
- Production company: Toho
- Distributed by: Toho
- Release date: August 11, 1964 (Japan)
- Running time: 83 minutes
- Country: Japan
- Language: Japanese

Dogora (宇宙大怪獣ドゴラ, Uchū Daikaijū Dogora; lit. 'Giant Space Monster Dogora') is a 1964 Japanese kaiju film directed by Ishirō Honda, with special effects by Eiji Tsuburaya. Produced and distributed by Toho Studios, the film stars Yosuke Natsuki, Nobuo Nakamura, Hiroshi Koizumi, and Akiko Wakabayashi, along with American actor Robert Dunham. The film tells the story of a huge jellyfish-like carbon-eating creature from space that attacks Japan.

Dogora was released theatrically in Japan on August 11, 1964. It was released directly to television in the United States in 1966 by American International Television, under the title Dagora, the Space Monster.

== Plot ==
When several TV satellites launched by the Electric Wave Laboratory go missing above Japan, people later discover that they collided with unidentified protoplasmic "space cells" of unknown origin.

Meanwhile, Inspector Komai's investigation of unexplained disappearances of diamonds across the globe leads him to the crystallographer Dr. Munakata. While tracking down self-proclaimed diamond broker Mark Jackson, Komai finds him in Munakata's home, but gets knocked out while Jackson is taken by gangsters for questioning. Komai awakens to find Munakata and his lab assistant Masayo Kirino, and tells them of his case before learning the recently stolen diamonds were worthless synthetics. Komai escorts Masayo home and meets Kirino, Masayo's brother who works at the Electric Wave Laboratory. All three witness sparking clouds and a strange invisible force pulling coal from a nearby factory into the sky. They return to Munakata, who theorizes the sparks might be a form of carbon.

Meanwhile, the gangsters bring Jackson to their boss and find the stolen diamonds. Upon realizing they are fake, they attempt to keep Jackson prisoner, but he outwits them and escapes. The gangsters receive word that a new shipment of raw diamonds will arrive in Yokohama and later attack the armored car carrying the diamonds, only to learn that they are also fake. As a result, one of their number, Hamako, schemes to steal the real diamonds for herself. Nearby, the invisible force lifts and drops a nearby coal truck.

When the police learn of the heist, Komai suggests that a creature grabbed the coal truck, but no one believes him. Masayo calls to tell him that Jackson is at Munakata's home again. Komai and the police surround the building, but Jackson reveals he is an investigator sent by the World Diamond Insurance Association to determine the diamond thief's identity. Kirino arrives soon after and tells everyone that the United Nations' Space Planning Committee determined the space cells were mutated by the satellites' radiation into a jellyfish-like monster, later named Dogora. Suddenly, Dogora attacks and eats through Munakata's safe to eat the diamonds inside.

Scientists determine Dogora is drawing energy from carbon-based minerals. Munakata, confident in a remarkable scientific discovery, leaves for the coal mines near northern Kyushu, theorizing it will be the monster's next target. Jackson joins him as well. As Munakata arrives at the mines, unidentified objects begin to show up on radar. In retaliation for their nests being disturbed, a swarm of wasps attack Dogora, causing a chemical reaction that crystallizes sections of its body and fall on the city below. The humans later discover what happened and order artificial wasp venom be mass-produced worldwide.

As night falls over Dokaiwan Bay, evacuation orders go into effect as Dogora descends from the sky and absorbs carbon-based materials from various sources. The military fires artillery at the alien and seemingly succeed in silencing it. However, it undergoes mitosis and targets various global sources.

Desperate for a successful heist, the gangsters track Jackson and Komai, assuming the former hid the real diamonds in a safe-deposit box. Hamako retrieves the box, but later learns it also contained synthetic diamonds. The gangsters leave Jackson and Komai to die bound to dynamite, but the two manage to escape. Dogora continues its attacks, but the military use the artificial venom to quickly eat away at the creature. The gangsters and police clash at the beach, with the former crushed by a crystalline boulder. Soon, the venom successfully kills Dogora and Munakata leaves for the U.N. to discuss the potential of the Dogora incident with the world.

== Cast ==
- Yosuke Natsuki as Inspector Komai
- Yoko Fujiyama as Masayo Kirino
- Hiroshi Koizumi as Professor Kirino, Masayo's Brother
- Robert Dunham as Mark Jackson (as Dan Yuma)
- Akiko Wakabayashi as Gangster Natsui Hamako
- Nobuo Nakamura as Dr. Munakata
- Jun Tazaki as Chief Inspector
- Susumu Fujita as General Iwasa
- Seizaburou Kawazu as Gangster, Boss
- Hideyo Amamoto as Gangster Maki, Safecracker
- Haruya Kato as Sabu, Short Gangster
- Yoshifumi Tajima as Gangster Nadao Kirino
- Akira Wakamatsu as Gangster
- Hironobu Wakamoto as Nitta, Inspector
- Yasuhisa Tsutsumi as Military Official
- Hironobu Wakamoto as Nitta, Inspector
- Shoichi Hirose as Truck Driver
- Ichiro Chiba as Truck Passenger
- Wataru Omae, Keiko Sawai as Scientists
- Koji Uno as Reporter
- Tadashi Okabe as Police Officer
- Yutaka Nakayama as Floating Civilian
- Yutaka Oka as Escort

== Production ==
=== Writing ===
In 1962, after the success of Gorath, Toho immediately had ideas of producing a space monster movie. Simply titled, “Space Mons” (スペース・モンス, Supesu Monsu), written by Jojiro Okami, would be his last proposal for Toho. The proposal was given to Shinichi Sekizawa and renamed “Space Monster” (宇宙大怪獣, Uchu Daikaiju), dropping the unique "Mons" name of the original concept. The story would have followed the futuristic settings of his later two films: Battle in Outer Space and Gorath. It also contains an ongoing theme of his work: humanity uniting on a global scale to address a threat, which after aliens and a rogue star is now monsters. In terms of the production crew, the story treatment was set to be turned into a full script by Shinichi Sekizawa while Ishiro Honda would direct and Eiji Tsuburaya would handle the special effects.

However, feeling that they wouldn’t be able to pull off the effects needed to bring the strange space cells to life at the time, the concept languished at Toho for some time after the initial pitch.

In 1964, Toho had initially planned to release a sequel to King Kong vs. Godzilla (1962), Continuation: King Kong vs. Godzilla in the summer of that year, but when that project failed to materialize, this film—already having a completed script—was selected at the last minute and pushed it into production. “Earth Martial Law” (地球戒厳令, Chikyu Kaigenrei), a first draft title, was written by Shinichi Sekizawa.

At some point, the script went through a heavy revision. Gone was the futuristic setting that had been a stable of Okami's other films. Instead it was set in the then modern times with elements that would be relatable to audiences. For example, the initial attack on the space station and rocket planes was replaced by a short sequence of the creature destroying a modern television satellite. The global angle was also downplayed, talked about but the story always stays in Japan. A jewel heist concept was also added, which became the side story to the movie. Finally the Space Mons were adapted into a monster called Dogora, of which other alterations occurred. The two still shared an appetite for carbon, like diamonds, but instead of always being invisible throughout the film the Dogora do eventually take an on screen, squid-like appearance. A weakness to venom for the monsters was also added, that would be used in the climax.

The concept went through more drafts, and had its title eventually changed to "Giant Space Monster Dogora" before being released in 1964.

=== Filming ===
During an interview, actor Robert Dunham projects that filming for the movie lasted about six to eight weeks.

Mentioned during an interview with actor Robert Dunham, Toho was very excited about the Mark Jackson character in the movie. In fact, they envisioned making a series of films featuring the character. They had such faith in the idea that they sent the actor, Robert Dunham, to Hollywood to both negotiate a distribution deal for the movie Dogora and kindle interest in a series on the character. Unfortunately, Dunham accounts how he was given a lowball offer for Dogora while the prospect of more movies on Mark Jackson was dashed when it was noted that he wasn't a name actor and it was hard to gauge his performance with the dubbing. He believes this is why Nick Adams, who was known in the States, was picked for later movies like Frankenstein vs. Baragon (1965).

=== Special effects ===
The film is unusual for Toho's giant monster series in that the creature is non-anthropomorphic and not portrayed by an actor in a costume. The design for Dogora came from a 3D illustration by Shigeru Komatsuzaki for the Shogakukan publication Weekly Shonen Saturday. The monster's design used protozoa for reference. The process of creating Dogora's onscreen prop was very time-consuming and characterized by trial-and-error in every step, from searching for the correct material to determining the method in which to shoot it. After seeing the design for Dogora, Keizo Murase thought about using soft vinyl, a material which had recently become available on the market. Murase visited a factory in Chiba and purchased a soft vinyl mold for 200 thousand yen. While the mold was rather expensive, special effects director Eiji Tsuburaya agreed with Murase's decision to use soft vinyl. Next, Kanji Yagi created a 1-foot clay mold for Dogora and brought it to the aforementioned factory where it was used to create a soft vinyl miniature for Dogora. However, there was concern that attempting to operate the prop through the normal method of suspending it in the air with piano wire could risk breaking it. Murase came up with the method of placing the prop in a tank of water and manipulating it with fishing line. When Murase showed this to Tsuburaya, he was very pleased that they had finally found a successful method to manipulate the prop.

When shooting began, the Dogora prop was placed in the tank and made to "dance" through the water using water flow from a valve fixed at the bottom of the tank. This had the unintended effect of producing bubbles which became visible in the finished take. According to Teruyoshi Nakano, the water from the local Waterworks Bureau on the day of filming was white and cloudy, meaning the staff had difficulty keeping the tank transparent enough for filming and was unable to shoot very much footage of the Dogora prop. As a result, Dogora's full jellyfish-like form only appears briefly in a single sequence in the finished film despite being heavily featured in marketing and promotion.

Dogora's single-celled form, which was the primary state the creature appeared in onscreen, was created by sandwiching liquid organic glass between plates of solid glass, which was then synthesized into live-action footage. To depict Dogora's cells crystallizing, a light bulb was attached to a 15 centimeter polyvinyl chloride miniature. An electrical current was sent to the bulb through piano wire, causing it to illuminate and giving the effect of the miniature flashing and emitting light.

Dogora's sound effects were created by capturing the sounds of clams using a special respiratory sound pickup microphone. These sounds were combined with other sound effects which would later be used for the Lady Guard alarm in Invasion of Astro-Monster (1966) the following year and for the monsters Alien Baltan and Bullton in Ultraman.

== US release ==
Toho had an English-language version of Dogora prepared in Hong Kong by Ted Thomas's Axis Productions. Because Robert Dunham primarily spoke Japanese for his role in the film, his voice was dubbed into English by another actor. In April 1965, Dogora played at the Toho Theatre in Honolulu, Hawaii, in Japanese with English subtitles. A newspaper ad in the Honolulu Advertiser referred to it as Space Monster Dogora. Dogora was licensed for U.S. release to American International Pictures. Its television unit, American International Television, first offered the film to television stations as Dagora, the Space Monster in the "Amazing '66" syndication package starting in 1965. It would later be included in AITV's "SciFi 65" package. Dogora was not re-dubbed for AITV's release; this version featured no on-screen credits of any kind, only the new opening title.

As Dagora, the Space Monster, the film was never officially issued on home video, although unlicensed copies from Video Yesteryear were produced in the 1980s and 1990s. Media Blasters released the film on DVD on July 15, 2005 under its Tokyo Shock label; audio options on the disc included the original Japanese audio with removable English subtitles and the original Toho international dub.

== In popular culture ==
In "Home Sweet Home for the Aged", a 1973 episode of the television series Sanford and Son, Fred laments about missing this movie while out on a Sunday drive.

== Bibliography ==
- Ragone, August (2007, 2014). Eiji Tsuburaya: Master of Monsters San Francisco, California: Chronicle Books. ISBN 9780811860789.
