= Shin'ichirō Nakamura =

Japanese writer (1918–1997)

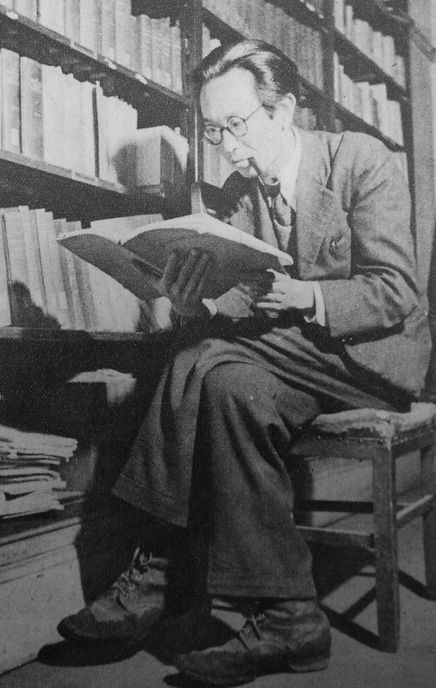
In 1948

Shin'ichirō Nakamura (中村 真一郎, Nakamura Shin'ichirō; March 5, 1918 – December 25, 1997) was a Japanese author.

== Prizes ==
- 1978 Tanizaki Prize for Natsu (Summer, 夏)

== English translations ==
- The Genie and Her Magic Bottle, translated by Hanabusa, Prism International, Vol. 11, No. 2, Autumn 1971.

== Selected works ==
- Kinō to kyō no monogatari, 1948.
- Ōchō no bungaku, 1957.
- Shi no kage no shita ni, 1951.
- Shi no kage no shita ni, Tokyo : Shinzenbi Sha, 1947.
- Aishin to shishin to, 1950.
- Shishū, 1950.
- Tamashii no yoru no naka o, 1951.
- Nagai tabi no owari, 1952.
- Bungaku no miryoku, 1953.
- Bungaku no sōzō, 1953.
- Nakamura Shinʾichirō shū, 1953.
- Akutagawa Ryūnosuke, 1954.
- Yahanraku, 1954.
- Tsumetai tenshi, 1955.
- Yasei no onna, 1955.
- Akutagawa Ryūnosuke no sekai, 1956.
- Nagai Kafū kenkyū, 1956.
- Bungakuteki kankaku, 1959.
- Ōchō bungaku no sekai, 1963.
- Sengo bungaku no kaisō, 1963.
- Kyūkon, 1964.
- Joseiron nōto, 1967.
- Akutagawa Ryūnosuke no sekai, 1968.
- Genji monogatari no sekai, 1968.
- Kin no uo, 1968.
- Watakushi no hyakushō, 1968.
- Enkaku kannō, 1969.
- Hi no matsuri, 1969.
- Kindai bungaku e no gimon, 1970.
- Kokoro no sakeme, 1970.
- Nakamura Shinʾichirō chōhen zenshū, 1970.
- Seiō bungaku to watakushi, 1970.
- Shi no henreki, 1970.
- Hihyō no koyomi, 1971.
- Hyōka no shi, 1971.
- Rai Sanʾyō to sono jidai, 1971.
- Tachihara Michizō kenkyū, 1971.
- Hori Tatsuo, 1972.
- Kenreimonʾin Ukyō Daibu, 1972.
- Koji hakkutsu, 1972.
- Nakamura Shinʾichirō hyōron zenshū, 1972.
- Nakamura Shinʾichirō shū, 1972.
- Netsuaisha, 1972.
- Ai no hōtei, 1973.
- Nakamura Shinʾichirō tampen zenshū, 1973.
- Taiwahen, 1973.
- Tōi musume, 1973.
- Kinsei onna katagi, 1974.
- Koji hakkutsu, 1974.
- Kono hyakunen no shōsetsu, 1974.
- Ansen yawa, 1975.
- Bunshō tokuhon, 1975.
- Nihon koten ni miru sei to ai, 1975.
- Shiki, 1975.
- Shisetsu Genji monogatari, 1975.
- Yumegatari, 1975.
- Kodoku, 1976.
- Nagai kaifukuki (長い 回復期), Tōkyō : Seiga Shobō, 1976.
- Rai Sanʾyō to sono jidai, 1976.
- Shijin no niwa, 1976.
- Shinsei kazoku, 1976.
- Yowa no nezame, 1976.
- Taishō sakka ron, 1977.
- Meiji sakka ron, 1978.
- Monte Kurisuto Haku, c1978.
- Natsu (夏), 1978.
- Rensa hannō, 1978.
- Shinigao, 1978.
- Dokusho wa tanoshimi, 1979.
- Shōwa sakka ron, 1979.
- Akutagawa, Hori. Tachihara no bungaku to sei, 1980.
- Kioku no mori, 1980.
- Shōsetsu no hōhō : watakushi to "nijisseiki shōsetsu", Tokyo : Shūeisha, 1981.
- Toki no naka e no tabi, 1981.
- Hon o yomu, Tokyo : Shinchōsha, 1982.
- Shōsetsu kōsō e no kokoromi, Tōkyō : Shoritsu Kaze no Bara, 1982.
- Waga tenkibo, Tokyo : Shinchōsha, 1982.
- Eien no shojo, Tōkyō : Shinchōsha, 1983.
- Sengo bungaku no kaisō, Tōkyō : Chikuma Shobō, 1983.
- Watakushi no Seiō bungaku (私 の 西欧 文学), Tōkyō : Iwanami Shoten, 1984.
- Bungaku no hōhō (文学 の 方法), Tōkyō : Iwanami Shoten, 1984.
- Fuyu (冬), Tōkyō : Shinchōsha, 1984.
- Geijutsu o megutte (芸術 を めぐって), Tōkyō : Iwanami Shoten, 1984.
- Kindai no sakkatachi (近代 の 作家たち), Tōkyō : Iwanami Shoten, 1984.
- Nakamura Shinʾichirō gekishi shūsei (中村 真一郎 劇詩 集成), Tōkyō : Shichōsha, 1984.
- Watakushi no koten (私 の 古典), Tōkyō : Iwanami Shoten, 1984.
- Ōchō to Edo (王朝 と 江戶), Tōkyō : Kokusho Kankōkai, 1985.
- Yume no fukken (夢 の 復権), Tōkyō : Fukutake Shoten, 1985.
- Zoku Shōsetsu kōsō e no kokoromi (続・小說 構想 へ の 試み), Tōkyō : Shoshi Kaze no Bara : Hatsubaijo Seiunsha, 1985.
- Ai, jinsei, geijutsu (愛・人生・芸術), Tōkyō : Kokusho Kankōkai, 1985.
- Bungaku to kindai (文学 と 近代), Tōkyō : Kokusho Kankōkai, 1985.
- Dokusho-zanmai (読書三昧), Tōkyō : Shinchōsha, 1985.
- Edo kanshi (江戶 漢詩), Tōkyō : Iwanami Shoten, 1985.
- Gensō to sekai (幻想 と 世界), Tōkyō : Kokusho Kankōkai, 1985.
- Irogonomi no kōzō : ōchō bunka no shinsō (色好み の 溝造 : 王朝 文化 の 深層), Tōkyō : Iwanami Shoten, 1985.
- Kurui (狂), Tōkyō : Sakuhinsha, 1986.
- Shi o kangaeru (死 を 考える), Tōkyō : Chikuma Shobō, 1988.
- Hi no yama no monogatari : waga kaisō no Karuizawa (火 の 山 の 物語 : わが 回想 の 軽井沢), Tōkyō : Chikuma Shobō, 1988.
- Ai to bi to bungaku : waga kaisō (愛 と 美 と 文学 : わが 回想), Tōkyō : Iwanami Shoten, 1989.
- Midoriiro no jikan no naka de (绿色 の 時間 の なか で), Tōkyō : Chikuma Shobō, 1989.
- Haiku no tanoshimi (俳句 の たのしみ), Tōkyō : Shinchōsha, 1990.
- Hagiwara Sakutarō (萩原 朔太郎), Tōkyō : Ushio Shuppansha, 1991.
- Dokusho no yorokobi (読書 の よろこび ), Tōkyō : Shinchōsha, 1991.
- Shōsetsuka Henrī Jeimuzu (小說家 ヘンリー・ジェイムズ), Tōkyō : Shūeisha, 1991.
- Bungaku to shite no hyōden (文学 と して の 評伝), Tōkyō : Shinchōsha, 1992.
- Nakamura Shinʾichirō shōsetsu shūsei (中村 真一郎 小說 集成), Tōkyō : Shinchōsha, 1992-1993.
- Nyotai gensō (女体 幻想), Tōkyō : Shinchōsha, 1992.
- Shōsetsu to wa hontō wa nani ka (小說 と は 本当 は 何 か), Nagoya-shi : Kawai Bunka Kyōiku Kenkyūjo; Tōkyō : Kawai Shuppan, 1992.
- Ōchō monogatari : shōsetsu no mirai ni mukete (王朝 物語 : 小說 の 未来 に 向けて), Tōkyō : Ushio Shuppansha, 1993.
- Ansen kūdan (暗泉 空談), Tōkyō : Shūeisha, 1994.
- Bungakuteki sanpo : zuisōshū (文学的 散步 : 随想集), Tōkyō : Chikuma Shobō, 1994.
- Dokusho no kairaku (読書 の 快楽), Tōkyō : Shinchōsha, 1994.
- Gendai bijo sugoroku (現代 美女 双六), Tōkyō : Kawade Shobō Shinsha, 1995.
- Saidoku Nihon kindai bungaku (再読 日本 近代 文学), Tōkyō : Shūeisha, 1995.
- Tamashii no bōryoku (魂 の 暴力), Tōkyō : Chūō Kōronsha, 1995.
- Waga kokoro no shijintachi : Tōson, Hakushū, Sakutarō, Tatsuji (わが 心 の 詩人たち : 藤村・白秋・朔太郎・達治), Tōkyō : Ushio Shuppansha, 1998.
- Nakamura Shinʾichirō (中村 真一郎), Tōkyō : Nihon Tosho Sentā, 2000.
