= Rodan =

Fictional monster, or kaiju

- Rodan and Godzilla character
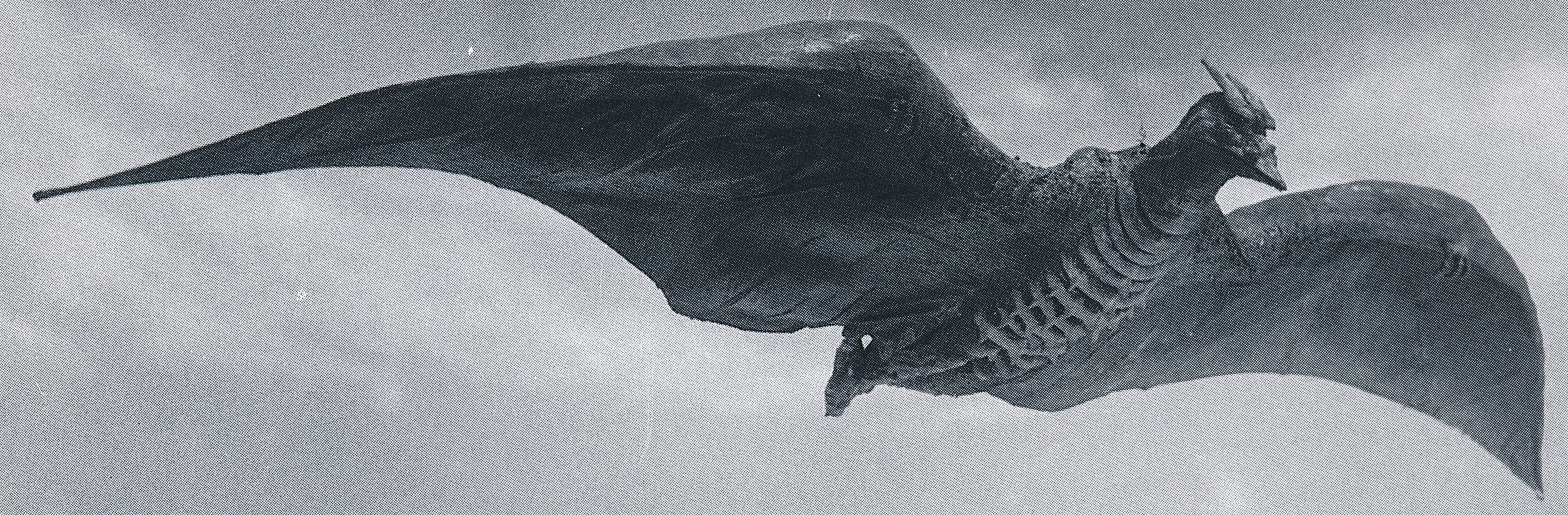
- Rodan during the behind the scenes of the Rodan (1956)
- First appearance: Rodan (1956)
- Created by: Ken Kuronuma
- Portrayed by: Shōwa series Haruo Nakajima; Kōji Uruki; Masaki Shinohara; Teruo Aragaki; Millennium series Naoko Kamio
- Motion capture: Legendary Pictures; Jason Liles

In-universe information
- Aliases: Radon; Monster Zero-Two; The Fire Demon; Titanus Rodan
- Species: Irradiated Pteranodon

Rodan (Japanese: ラドン, Hepburn: Radon) is a giant pteranodon-like monster, or kaiju, which first appeared in the eponymous 1956 film, directed by Ishirō Honda and produced and distributed by Toho. He is depicted as a colossal, prehistoric, irradiated species of Pteranodon.

Following his standalone debut, Rodan went on to be featured in numerous entries in the Godzilla franchise. In 2014, IGN ranked Rodan as #6 on its "Top 10 Japanese Movie Monsters" list, while Complex listed the character as #15 on its "The 15 Most Badass Kaiju Monsters of All Time" list.

== Development ==
=== Name ===
The Japanese name Radon is a contraction of Pteranodon. The spelling of Radon in Japanese also corresponds to the name of Ladon, the dragon guarding the Hesperides in Greek mythology - since there is no distinction between "l" and "r" in Japanese.

It was changed to Rodan for English-speaking markets in order to avoid confusion with the element radon. However, in Godzilla vs. Mechagodzilla II, the English version of the film used the original name Radon.

=== Behind the scenes ===
As with Godzilla, writer Ken Kuronuma turned to prehistoric animals for inspiration in developing the character, though unlike the former, whose species is largely left ambiguous, Rodan is explicitly stated to be a kind of Pteranodon. Just as Godzilla was conceived as a symbol of an American nuclear threat, Rodan was seen as an embodiment of the same danger originating from the Soviet Union.

=== Roar ===
The character's shriek was created by sound technician Ichiro Minawa, who sought to replicate the "contrabass technique" composer Akira Ifukube used for Godzilla. He layered it with a sped up human voice. The sound would be remixed and reused for several other Toho monsters, including the Heisei incarnation of King Ghidorah and Battra.

== History ==
=== Showa era (1956–1968) ===
Rodan, as portrayed by Teruoshi Nigaki in Destroy All Monsters

Rodan's debut appearance was the first and only time the character was given a chestnut color. He originally had a menacing face with a jagged, toothed beak, which would disappear in later incarnations as the character became more heroic. Rodan was portrayed via a combination of suitmation and wire-operated puppets for flight sequences. During suitmation sequences, Rodan was portrayed by Haruo Nakajima, who almost drowned when the wires holding the 150 lb. suits above a water tank snapped. In Ghidorah, the Three-Headed Monster, the Rodan suit was of visibly lesser quality than the previous one, having a more comical face, a thick neck which barely concealed the shape of the performer's head within, and triangular wings. The modification of the character's face was deliberate, as Rodan was meant to be a slapstick character rather than the tragic villain seen in his film debut. A new suit was constructed for Invasion of Astro-Monster which more closely resembled the first, having more rounded wings and a sleeker face. The sleek face was retained in Destroy All Monsters, though the wings and chest area were crudely designed.

=== Heisei era (1993) ===
Rodan as seen in Godzilla vs. Mechagodzilla II (1993)

Rodan was revived in 1993's Godzilla vs. Mechagodzilla II, this time portrayed entirely via a wire-manipulated marionette and hand puppets. Having received criticism for his emphasis on battle sequences relying heavily on beam weapons, special effects artist Koichi Kawakita sought to make the confrontation between Godzilla and Rodan as physical as possible.

=== Reiwa era (2017–2021) ===
The skeletal remains of an individual Rodan appears in the prologue of Godzilla: Planet of the Monsters, having been killed in China. This is expanded upon in the prequel novel Godzilla: Monster Apocalypse, in which it is revealed the Rodan emerged from Paektu Mountain in November 2005, attacked China, and battled Anguirus before they were both killed by a bio-weapon created by the Chinese military called Hedorah. In 2036, a flock of Rodans took over Siberia, competing against a swarm of Megaguiruses to prey on European refugees on the Trans-Siberian Railway. In Godzilla: City on the Edge of Battle's prequel novel Godzilla: Project Mechagodzilla, a second Rodan was said to have attacked Kyushu in 2029 while another flock of Rodans attacked Rome to prey on humans and eventually took over the Italian Peninsula in the mid-2030s. While enacting "Operation: Long March" and "Operation: Great Wall" in 2044 and 2045 respectively, United Earth forces faced attacks from an individual Rodan, among other monsters, in North Africa as well as a third flock of Rodans feeding on Meganulon in China.

Godzilla Singular Point features various Rodans which are based on the Quetzalcoatlus. Most times, Rodan is smaller than its older counterparts, however, a larger, dark Rodan appears in the show, which is shortly killed by Godzilla.

Rodan appears in Godzilla the Ride: Giant Monsters Ultimate Battle, a 5-minute short film directed by Takashi Yamazaki, In the film, Rodan fights against King Ghidorah, but Ghidorah kills him mid-flight.

=== Monsterverse (2019–2026) ===
Rodan as he appears in Godzilla: King of the Monsters

In 2014, Legendary Pictures announced that they had acquired the rights to Rodan, Mothra and King Ghidorah from Toho to use in their Monsterverse.

Rodan appears in the post-credits scene of Kong: Skull Island, which depicts cave paintings showing him, Mothra, King Ghidorah, and Godzilla in footage that is shown to James Conrad and Mason Weaver.

A casting call confirmed that Rodan, Mothra, and King Ghidorah would be featured in Godzilla: King of the Monsters. Viral marketing describes him as a titanic kaiju with the skeletal structure of a Pteranodon and magma-like skin serving as plate armor. The film's promotional website, Monarch Sciences, identifies the fictional island of Isla de Mara off the eastern coast of Mexico as Rodan's location and describes him as being 154 ft (46.94 m) tall with a weight of 39,043 tons and a wingspan of 871 ft (265.48 m), making it the shortest version of the character, yet also the heaviest and the one with the greatest wingspan, though part of the short height is this version of Rodan being a quadruped like a real pterosaur as opposed to an upright biped like the Toho versions. He is also stated to be powerful enough to level cities with thunderclaps generated by his wings.

In Godzilla: King of the Monsters, Colonel Alan Jonah uses Dr. Emma Russell to have the ORCA device awaken Rodan from Monarch's Mexican outpost 56. With Rodan awoken, Monarch's jets lead him into fighting King Ghidorah where he is defeated. After Godzilla is presumably killed by the Oxygen Destroyer, Rodan sides with Ghidorah before being defeated by Mothra in Boston and then switching loyalties to Godzilla after Ghidorah is destroyed, leading the other Titans into bowing to him. According to a news clipping shown in the end credits, Rodan returned to hibernation in Mt. Fuji.

In the second season finale of Monarch: Legacy of Monsters, which takes place before the events of Godzilla: King of the Monsters, Lee Shaw travels to Southeast Asia to settle his debts with an old friend and asks him for help in finding a Titan. The Titan is later revealed to be Rodan, who is awake and perched atop an active volcano.

== Appearances ==
Stock footage that featured Rodan was used in several films, such as Valley of the Dragons, Godzilla vs. Gigan, Godzilla vs. Megalon, Terror of Mechagodzilla, Bye-Bye Jupiter, and Godzilla vs. Kong. A post-credits scene in the 2017 film Kong: Skull Island depicts cave paintings of Godzilla, Rodan, Mothra and King Ghidorah.

=== Films ===
- Rodan (1956)
- Ghidorah, the Three-Headed Monster (1964)
- Invasion of Astro-Monster (1965)
- Destroy All Monsters (1968)
- Godzilla vs. Mechagodzilla II (1993)
- Godzilla: Final Wars (2004)
- Godzilla: King of the Monsters (2019)

=== Television ===
- Godzilla Island (1997–1998)
- Godzilla Singular Point (2021)
- Godzilland (1992–1993)
- Godziban (2019–present)
- Chibi Godzilla Raids Again (2023–present)
- Monarch: Legacy of Monsters (2026)

=== Video games ===
- Godzilla / Godzilla-Kun: Kaijuu Daikessen (Game Boy; 1990)
- Circus Caper (NES; 1990)
- Godzilla 2: War of the Monsters (NES; 1991)
- Battle Soccer: Field no Hasha (SNES; 1992)
- Kaijū-ō Godzilla / King of the Monsters, Godzilla (Game Boy; 1993)
- Godzilla: Battle Legends (Turbo Duo; 1993)
- Godzilla Giant Monster March (Game Gear; 1995)
- Godzilla Trading Battle (PlayStation; 1998)
- Godzilla: Destroy All Monsters Melee (GCN, Xbox; 2002/2003)
- Godzilla: Domination! (GBA; 2002)
- Godzilla: Save the Earth (Xbox, PS2; 2004)
- Godzilla: Unleashed (Wii; 2007)
- Godzilla Unleashed: Double Smash (NDS; 2007)
- Godzilla: Unleashed (PS2; 2007)
- Godzilla: The Game (PS3/PS4; 2015)
- Godzilla Defense Force (2019)
- Godzilla Battle Line (2021)

=== Literature ===
- Godzilla vs. Mechagodzilla II (1993)
- Godzilla King of the Monsters (1994)
- Godzilla vs. Gigan and the Smog Monster (1996)
- Godzilla on Monster Island (1996)
- Godzilla Saves America: A Monster Showdown in 3-D! (1996)
- Godzilla 2000 (novel; 1997)
- Godzilla at World's End (novel; 1998)
- Godzilla vs. the Robot Monsters (novel; 1998)
- Godzilla: Journey to Monster Island (novel; 1998)
- Godzilla vs. the Space Monster (novel; 1998)
- Godzilla Likes to Roar! (1998)
- Who's Afraid of Godzilla? (1998)
- Godzilla: Kingdom of Monsters (comic; 2011–2012)
- Godzilla: Gangsters & Goliaths (comic; 2011)
- Godzilla: Legends (comic; 2011–2012) featuring Baby Rodan
- Godzilla (comic; 2012)
- Godzilla: The Half-Century War (comic; 2012–2013)
- Godzilla: Rulers of Earth (comic; 2013–2015)
- Godzilla: Cataclysm (comic; 2014)
- Godzilla in Hell (comic; 2015)
- Godzilla: Oblivion (comic; 2016)
- Godzilla: Rage Across Time (comic; 2016)
- Godzilla: Monster Apocalypse (novel; 2017)

== Bibliography ==
- Berry, Mark F. (2005). The Dinosaur Filmography. McFarland & Company. ISBN 9780786424535.
- "Miniatures" by Stephen Dedman, Eidolon Magazine summer 1996, volume 5, issue 3 (also known as whole number issue 20 and the "Harlan Ellison Conference Issue"). Eidolon Publications, North Perth, Australia. ISSN 1038-5657.
