= Godzilla 2 =

Godzilla 2 may refer to:

- Godzilla Raids Again, the sequel to the original 1954 film
- Godzilla vs. Mechagodzilla II
- Godzilla: City on the Edge of Battle, the second film in the Godzilla anime trilogy, sometimes referred to as Godzilla 2: City on the Edge of Battle in marketing
- Godzilla: King of the Monsters (2019 film), the sequel to Godzilla (2014), also titled Godzilla II: King of the Monsters in some languages
- Godzilla Minus Zero, the upcoming sequel to Godzilla Minus One
- Godzilla 2: War of the Monsters, the second Godzilla video game released for the Nintendo Entertainment System
