= King Ghidorah =

Kaiju from Godzilla franchise

- Godzilla character
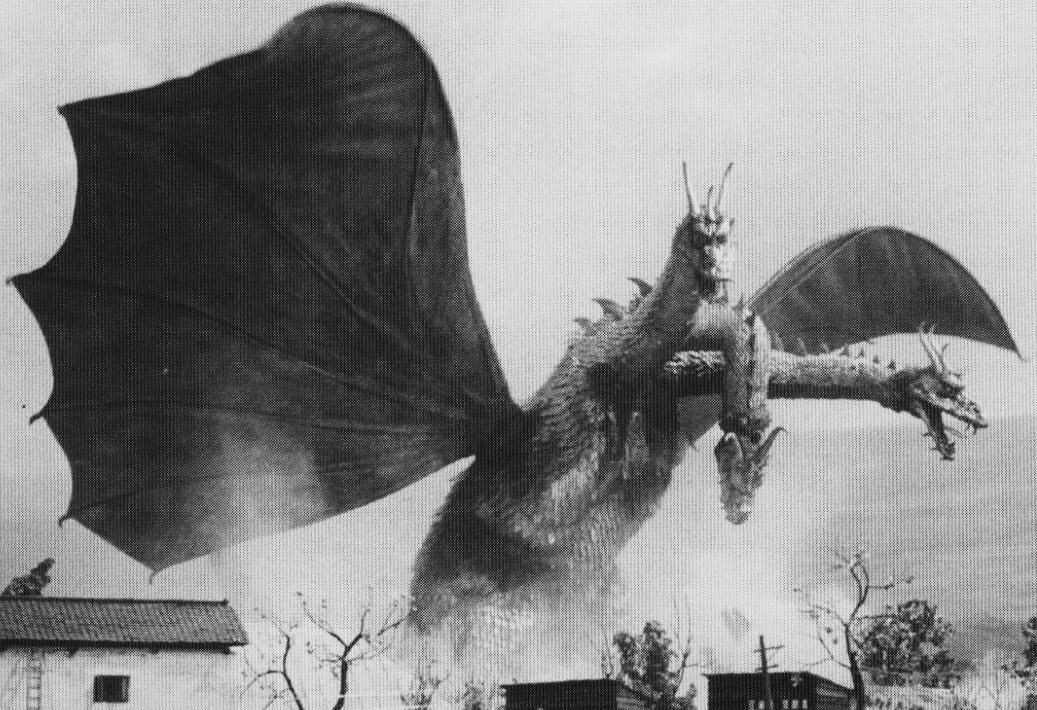
- King Ghidorah, as portrayed by Shoichi Hirose via suitmation during the filming of Ghidorah, the Three-Headed Monster.
- First appearance: Ghidorah, the Three-Headed Monster (1964)
- Created by: Tomoyuki Tanaka; Eiji Tsuburaya; Shinichi Sekizawa
- Designed by: Akira Watanabe
- Portrayed by: Shōwa era: Shoichi Hirose; Susumu Utsumi; Kanta Ina; Heisei era: Hurricane Ryu; Tsutomu Kitagawa; Millennium era: Akira Ohashi
- Motion capture: Legendary Pictures: Jason Liles; Alan Maxson; Richard Dorton

In-universe information
- Aliases: Ghidrah; King Ghidra; King Ghidora; Monster Zero; The 10,000 Year Old Dragon; The King of Terror; The Golden King; God of the Void; King of the Void
- Species: Three-headed draconic alien

King Ghidorah (Japanese: キングギドラ, Hepburn: Kingu Gidora) is a giant dragon-like extraterrestrial monster, or kaiju, in Toho’s Godzilla media franchise. He first appeared in the 1964 film Ghidorah, the Three-Headed Monster, directed by Ishirō Honda. The character was initially created by Tomoyuki Tanaka, Eiji Tsuburaya, and Shinichi Sekizawa as an homage to the eight-headed mythological Japanese dragon Yamata no Orochi. Although the name of the character is officially trademarked by Toho as "King Ghidorah", the character was initially referred to as Ghidrah in some English markets.

Although King Ghidorah's design has remained largely consistent throughout his appearances (an armless, bipedal, golden and yellowish-scaled dragon with three heads, two fan-shaped wings, and two tails), his origin story has varied from being an extraterrestrial planet-destroying dragon, a genetically engineered monster from the future, a guardian monster of ancient Japan, or a god from another dimension. The character is usually portrayed as the archenemy of Godzilla and a foe of Mothra, though he has had one appearance as an ally of the latter.

Despite rumors that Ghidorah was meant to represent the threat posed by China, which had at the time of the character's creation just developed nuclear weapons, director Ishirō Honda denied the connection and stated that Ghidorah was simply a modern take on the dragon Yamata no Orochi.

== Overview ==
=== Development ===
According to special effects director Eiji Tsuburaya's protégé Teruyoshi Nakano, the initial idea for Ghidorah, the Three-Headed Monster, came from Tomoyuki Tanaka, who also created Godzilla. Tanaka's inspiration came from an illustration of the Lernaean Hydra in a book about Greek mythology and Orochi of Japanese folklore. Tanaka was enamored with the idea of Godzilla fighting a multi-headed serpent but considered seven or eight heads excessive; thus, the number of heads was reduced to three. The final version, designed by Akira Watanabe, was a three-headed dragon with large wings, two tails, and of extraterrestrial origin.

Toho had also drawn inspiration from the three-headed dragon Zmey Gorynych or King Dragon キング・ドラゴン (Kingu Doragon) in the Japanese version of the 1956 Soviet film Ilya Muromets, which had been distributed theatrically in Japan by Shintoho in March 1959. King Ghidorah's name is composed of "King" (キング, Kingu) and "Ghidorah". The "Ghidorah" part of the name comes from the pronunciation of the word "hydra" (Гидра, ˈɡʲidrɐ) in Russian, written as ヒドラ (Hidora) in Japanese.

Other sources of inspiration included mythological creatures such as the hydra, cerberus, unicorn, pegasus, and qilin.

=== Abilities ===
King Ghidorah primarily attacks by blasting "gravity beams" from his three mouths. These lightning-like attacks are roughly equal in power to Godzilla's atomic breath, and can be combined to form a stronger blast. King Ghidorah is seen using this ability in all his appearances except for Godzilla: The Planet Eater, where King Ghidorah's form is instead composed of energy resembling gravity beams. King Ghidorah has sometimes shown control over gravity in general, allowing the kaiju to fly even after losing a wing, crush and destroy thousands of planets (as well as spacefaring craft) sacrificed to him, and cause nearby objects in the environment to float due to his mere presence.

One trait that is seen in all versions of King Ghidorah is his great wings, which he uses to fly at Mach 3 (or 550 knots in Godzilla: King of the Monsters). In space, he can travel in a meteorite that produces magnetic fields, and fly at speeds exceeding Mach 400. Aside from this, he can use his wings to shield himself from enemy attacks (even Godzilla's atomic breath), project lightning strikes similar to his gravity beams, and generate supersonic shockwaves and strong winds. Ghidorah's electrical properties and generation of powerful bursts of wind cause yellow lightning storms to manifest in his vicinity. The resulting unnatural hurricane can tear through the stratosphere, raise tornadoes and waterspouts, and reach sustained wind speeds of 349 kilometres per hour (217 miles per hour), strengthening over time, breaking the Saffir–Simpson scale and exceeding the strength of any known storm on Earth. Although supplementary materials for Godzilla: King of the Monsters state that this happens when Ghidorah takes flight due to his hyper-tensile tendons, traces of gold in his scales, and electro-receptor molecular biology, in the film proper, the process starts as soon as Ghidorah awakens on the ground. As hinted by several scenes in the film and stated in the novelization, Ghidorah's hurricane furthermore disrupts and alters worldwide weather patterns to cause even more storm systems around the world. In the comic Kingdom Kong, which takes place in 2019, not even a year after Ghidorah's defeat by the end of King of the Monsters, the agency of Monarch reports that the storm has reached wind speeds of 644 kilometers (400 miles) per hour, with air pressure so dense that it triggers new cyclones every five minutes and creates waterspouts that reach down to the sea floor.

In physical combat, King Ghidorah rapidly attacks with kicks and stomps from the air, constriction with one or more necks and even by grabbing enemies to drop them from the sky. In Godzilla vs. King Ghidorah, after King Ghidorah was killed by Godzilla, the future humans turned him into a cyborg called Mecha-King Ghidorah, which has a Gravity Laser Cannon in the mouth of his robotic head, electrified grapples and a mechanical arm in his chest for capturing Godzilla.

In Rebirth of Mothra III, King Ghidorah can construct a corrosive dome to drain the life force of captured victims for the kaiju to absorb. He also has the power of hypnosis on eye contact, project lightning bolts from his wings, barrier generation using the light of energy attacks used against him and regeneration of his entire body from severed body parts. When Mothra Leo traveled back in time to kill Ghidorah, the dragon's younger self is shown, less refined and spitting fireballs rather than gravity beams.

In Godzilla, Mothra and King Ghidorah: Giant Monsters All-Out Attack, King Ghidorah can electrocute his opponents by biting them, he can also gain power by absorbing the energy of dead monsters and form an energy shield capable of deflecting Godzilla's atomic breath.

In Godzilla: The Planet Eater, the third part of an animated trilogy, Ghidorah is depicted as an evolved entity from a universe with different physical laws that are worshiped by the Exif, who he influenced to become nihilists upon mastering advanced Gematron mathematics. While Ghidorah consumed the Exifs' homeworld, their first offering to him , through his gravitational powers, a few priests were spared and traveled to other worlds where they established cults to sacrifice the converted planets to Ghidorah in the same way. The Exifs summon Ghidorah by having worshippers call out to him in prayer during times of great despair, allowing Ghidorah to physically manifest as a shadow to consume the worshippers through their shadows before his heads finally emerge through black holes. His necks extend to infinite lengths, nigh-invisible to machines save for the gravitational energy he emanates, strong enough to distort Godzilla's heat ray by deflecting it or actually bending the concept of space. As long as someone native to the dimension he invades acts as his guiding anchor and witness, Ghidorah can defy that universe's physics, able to render himself intangible to enemy attacks whilst still capable of assaulting foes normally. He can even distort space-time and erode reality, able to change people's chronological perception of events and nearly succeeding in "erasing" Godzilla from existence. Though his avatar was rendered tangible to physics by the loss of connection to the priest serving as his key witness (thus allowing Godzilla to destroy his projection through reality), Ghidorah was simply banished back to his dimension, awaiting for another individual to serve as his link to open up his next chance to enter reality and feast. In order to prevent these circumstances from reoccurring, efforts had to be made to eliminate sources of anger, hate, despair, and revenge (achieved by the main character committing suicide with all of Earth's remaining machinery).

In Godzilla: King of the Monsters, Ghidorah has a divergent frontal lobe density in each of his heads, rendering each head capable of independent thoughts and divergent personality traits. His scales are capable of running bioelectrical currents through his body, aided by traces of gold in his dermal layer, allowing him to raise unnaturally strong storms that gradually increase in power. After draining all of Boston's electric power grid by chomping down on a power substation, King Ghidorah is able to unleash chain lightning from the tips of the bones in his wings (referencing his Rebirth of Mothra III incarnation) and later shows more of his vampiric, energy-draining capabilities when he chomps down on Godzilla in a nearly successful attempt to siphon away Godzilla's remaining nuclear energy along with the power boost Mothra's ashes provided him (referencing a similar attempt made by Keizer Ghidorah in Godzilla: Final Wars). As an alpha, Ghidorah's roar is able to awaken and influence other titans around the world into rampaging in the wake of Godzilla's supposed death, having taken over as king. Halfway through the film, he displays two "unnatural" abilities that were attributed to — and served as evidence of — his alien nature. The first is the durability to withstand the Oxygen Destroyer, emerging unscathed from the same detonation which severely injured Godzilla and killed all Earth-based lifeforms within a two-mile radius. The second is the possession of highly accelerated regenerative properties, having regrown the left head minutes after Godzilla tore it off, retaining the memories and personality since Ghidorah's neurons are spread throughout his body like in an octopus. However, according to the official novelization, a store of energy must be absorbed to do so, which Ghidorah acquired from the highly-radioactive lava of Rodan's volcano. Later on, the same power substation Ghidorah consumed to boost himself also healed up the wounds on his wing membranes immediately after he fired lightning from the tips of his wings. Eventually, Godzilla succeeded in incinerating Ghidorah's wings, side heads, body, and finally, the middle head, to prevent the alien dragon from coming back. However, Ghidorah was not entirely destroyed, for the head Godzilla bit off during the fight in Mexico remained intact and was salvaged.

In Godzilla vs. Kong, it is revealed that Ghidorah's heads communicated with each other via telepathy, as his necks were so long that communication via the nervous system was impractical. Apex Cybernetics, which has acquired Ghidorah's skull and brain, is using these telepathic abilities as the basis of a psychic control system for Mechagodzilla. Once Mechagodzilla received an energy source sufficient to power it properly, Ghidorah's mind suddenly transferred itself to this new body, frying the pilot to death as it seized total control of the robot.

In Godzilla Minus Zero, starting as a gelatinous mass that landed in a meteor, it assumes the form of one-headed wyvern after absorbing the local wildlife. Lightning meant to kill Ghidorah mutates it into its three-headed form. It later uses this ability to absorb Godzilla's DNA, but its long, thin necks render it unable to control the blast of Godzilla's atomic breath. It develops an additional ability to emanate a blue anti-gravity beam that allows it to lift large objects, such as entire buildings and Godzilla itself.

== Film history ==
=== Shōwa era (1964–1975) ===
In his debut film, Ghidorah, the Three-Headed Monster, Ghidorah is portrayed as an ancient extraterrestrial entity responsible for the destruction of the Venusian civilization, five thousand years before the film's events. His attempt to destroy Earth is thwarted by the combined efforts of Godzilla, Rodan and Mothra.

Subsequent Shōwa era films portrayed Ghidorah as the pawn of various alien races seeking to subjugate Earth. King Ghidorah appears in the fifth and sixth episodes of the television series Zone Fighter, where it is revealed that he is supposedly a creation of the Garoga aliens, though it is left unclear as to whether this statement is true or not.

Screenwriter Shinichi Sekizawa insisted that the Ghidorah suit be fabricated using light-weight silicone-based materials in order to grant the wearer greater mobility. The final Ghidorah design was constructed by special effects artist Teizo Toshimitsu, who had initially painted it green in order to further differentiate it from Godzilla, Rodan and Mothra, but changed it to gold on the insistence of Eiji Tsuburaya, after his assistant noted that being a creature from Venus, the "gold planet", Ghidorah should be that color.

The monster suit itself was built by Akira Watanabe and worn by Shoichi Hirose. Hirose walked hunched over inside the Ghidorah costume, holding a metal bar for balance, while puppeteers would control its heads, tails and wings off-camera like a marionette. The monster's heads were each fitted with remotely controlled motors, which were connected to operators via a wire extending from the suit's backside.

Performing as Ghidorah proved challenging to Hirose, as he had to time his movements in a way that would not conflict with the separately operated heads and wings, as doing so would have resulted in the overhead wires tangling. Because of the suit's weight, it frequently snapped the overhead wires supporting it. Special effects were added as the creature is capable emitting destructive, lightning-like "gravity beams" from its mouths and generating hurricane-force winds from its wings.

Despite King Ghidorah's central role in the film's plot, the character was given little screen time, as Hirose had fallen out with special effects director Eiji Tsuburaya, who never forgave Hirose for accepting a Hollywood deal, and subsequently he hired Susumu Utsumi to play King Ghidorah after Invasion of Astro-Monster. In that film, King Ghidorah was given a darker shade of gold, and his movements both on land and in the air were more fluid than during Ghidorah the Three-Headed Monster, as the special effects crew had at that point learned from the shortcomings of the previous film's depiction of the creature.

=== Heisei era (1991–1998) ===
Ghidorah and Mecha-King Ghidorah in Godzilla vs. King Ghidorah, the first incarnations of the character to appear during the franchise's Heisei era

In Godzilla vs. King Ghidorah (1991), the creature is re-envisioned as a trio of diminutive genetically engineered creatures called Dorats (Japanese: ドラッツ, Hepburn: Drats) owned by a group of humans from the 23rd century known as the Equal Environment Earth Union, a group dedicated to equalizing the power of Earth's nations. Seeking to stop Japan's global economic dominance in their timeline by transforming the Dorats into King Ghidorah through nuclear exposure, the Earth Unionists plant the Dorats on Lagos Island during the 1954 H-bomb tests there. Prior to doing so, they remove the dinosaur that would ultimately become Godzilla from the island, so that King Ghidorah would be able to attack Japan without opposition. In 1992, the Earth Unionists unleash Ghidorah onto Japan, but he is defeated by a recreated Godzilla.

King Ghidorah's body stays under the Sea of Okhotsk for two centuries before being recovered by a defected Earth Unionist to make him a cyborg and sent back to 1992 as Mecha-King Ghidorah (Japanese: メカキングギドラ, Hepburn: Meka Kingu Gidora) in order to stop Godzilla's rampage.

The character's manes were deleted and replaced with horns, as it proved difficult for the special effects team to superimpose the manes into footage of people escaping the monster. Special effects director Koichi Kawakita had originally planned on having each of Ghidorah's heads fire differently colored beams, but this was ultimately scrapped in favor of the classic yellow color. This version of King Ghidorah was portrayed by Hurricane Ryu.

In Godzilla vs. Mechagodzilla II (1993), Mecha-King Ghidorah's remains are salvaged by the United Nations Godzilla Countermeasures Center (UNGCC) and used to build Mechagodzilla.

In Rebirth of Mothra, a monster named Desghidorah appears, who heavily resembles King Ghidorah but has graphite black skin and a quadrupedal stance.

In Rebirth of Mothra III (1998), King Ghidorah is depicted as an extraterrestrial that landed on earth during the Cretaceous Period of the Mesozoic Era and wiped out the dinosaurs by draining them of their life energies. Ghidorah left Earth and returns in modern times to feed on human children. Mothra Leo fails to defeat the kaiju and travels back to the Cretaceous in order to kill Ghidorah retroactively. Mothra Leo defeats the younger Ghidorah, but the monster's severed tail allows him to regenerate back into his adult form in modern times. After hibernating from the Cretaceous era to the present day, aided by the ancient Primitive Mothra species, Mothra Leo finally kills the kaiju by transforming into a new form: "Armor Mothra". This version of King Ghidorah was portrayed by Tsutomu Kitagawa, who would go onto play Godzilla in the Millennium era.

=== Millennium era (2001) ===
Ghidorah, as depicted in Godzilla, Mothra and King Ghidorah: Giant Monsters All-Out Attack

In Godzilla, Mothra and King Ghidorah: Giant Monsters All-Out Attack, Ghidorah is portrayed as having been one of the three Guardians of Yamato, originating 1,000 years before the events of the film. Initially an antagonist, Ghidorah was imprisoned in Mount Fuji, only to be reawakened in 2001 to halt Godzilla's destruction of Tokyo. Ghidorah is defeated, but then revived and empowered by ally Mothra.

Director Shūsuke Kaneko had originally planned to use Varan as Godzilla's principal antagonist, but was pressured by Toho chairman Isao Matsuoka to use the more recognizable and profitable King Ghidorah, as the previous film in the franchise, Godzilla vs. Megaguirus, which featured an original and unfamiliar antagonist, was a box office and critical failure. In order to emphasize Ghidorah's heroic role in the movie, the creature's size was greatly reduced, and was portrayed by Akira Ohashi, who moved the creature's heads as hand puppets.

In Godzilla: Final Wars, a kaiju called Keizer Ghidorah (Japanese: カイザーギドラ, Hepburn: Kaizā Gidora) appears being based on Ghidorah as the true form of Monster X.

=== Reiwa era (2018–2026) ===
==== Anime trilogy (2018) ====
King Ghidorah (depicted as Void Ghidorah) battling Godzilla Earth in Godzilla: The Planet Eater (2018)

In the post-credits scene of Godzilla: City on the Edge of Battle, Metphies, a priest of the Exif alien race, reveals to the main character, Haruo Sakaki, the name of the god his people worship: Ghidorah. The entity appears as the main antagonist of Godzilla: The Planet Eater.

The anime incarnation of Ghidorah is markedly different from his original portrayal, having evolved to the point of discarding his physical body in favor of a form of pure astral energy with two tails, two wings, and three necks that extend infinitely (at least 20 kilometers or 12 miles in length in the film), stretching out of three black hole-like portals to devour planets sacrificed to him by the Exif cult with his gravitational powers while his torso remains within an alternate dimension. In this state, King Ghidorah is completely invulnerable as long as his 'anchor' remains alive, and is capable of completely ignoring the laws of physics of the dimensions he invades, with his powers including intangibility, the manipulation of thermodynamics, gravity and time through time dilation.

In the anime, Ghidorah is the deity worshipped by the Exif under the titles of "Wings of Death", "Golden Demise", and "God of Destruction". He is summoned to Earth by the cult set up by Metphies in order to destroy Godzilla and devour Earth just as they fed him other planets they visited and converted to the Exif to faith. Ghidorah overpowers Godzilla, who is left completely helpless while the interdimensional entity slowly erases him from reality. Metphies, who has linked himself to Ghidorah to serve as his witness to their reality, tries to convince Haruo to take his place as Ghidorah's link, since his thirst for revenge against Godzilla makes him the ideal host. Haruo refuses and breaks the link Metphies has to Ghidorah, causing the entity to be affected by conventional physical laws, allowing Godzilla to disperse, defeat, and effectively banish him back to his realm of reality for the time being while Metphies dies in the process. Some time later, Haruo receives a vision from Metphies, telling him that his lingering anger and desire to defeat Godzilla will ensure that Ghidorah will eventually be summoned again. With this, Haruo allows Godzilla to destroy him and all of Earth's remaining technology, sacrificing himself to prevent Ghidorah from returning to consume the Earth.

==== Theme park attractions (2019–2021) ====
In 2019, King Ghidorah was used in Godzilla vs. Evangelion: The Real 4-D, Though this version of Ghidorah was nicknamed "Shin Ghidorah" or "Shin King Ghidorah". King Ghidorah first shows up in the ride when an explosion condensed into a new shape, released by Shin Godzilla. As he descends on the city and confronts Shin Godzilla, Shin Godzilla fires his atomic breath once again, but Ghidorah uses his gravity powers to deflect the beam in separate directions. Ghidorah then uses his gravity beams to lift several surrounding buildings into the air and throw them at Shin Godzilla, incapacitating him . The Evangelion Units attempt to fight King Ghidorah themselves, but are unable to stop him . As they counter the dragon, Shin Godzilla rises back to his feet to continue battling the enemy. Ghidorah attacks Shin Godzilla, but he uses his dorsal plate beams to counter Ghidorah's assault and knock him back, before blasting Ghidorah with his atomic breath until he depletes himself and becomes immobilized.

As Ghidorah rises again, the three Eva Units continue their effort to fight the monster; Unit-00 and 02 jump on King Ghidorah's body but are blasted off by his gravity beams. Unit-01 pulls a sword off of a nearby building and thrusts it into Ghidorah's chest, causing him to crash into the city below. For a brief moment, the creature seems defeated, only for Ghidorah to rise completely unharmed from the rubble and turns his attention to the frozen Shin Godzilla to shoot at him with gravity beams. Shin Godzilla's body begins to glow again, seemingly using Ghidorah's attack to regain his energy. He awakens and fires his atomic breath at Ghidorah, causing the two kaijus beams to lock. Godzilla's beam gradually begins to overpower Ghidorah's, moving closer until it strikes at Ghidorah, creating a blinding explosion. Once the smoke settles, the Evangelion Units are left completely intact and King Ghidorah is gone, seemingly destroyed by the blast. Having defeated his rival, Shin Godzilla retreats back into the ocean, leaving Osaka-III and the EVA Units peacefully.

In 2021, King Ghidorah was used again in Godzilla the Ride: Giant Monsters Ultimate Battle, this time it was redesigned by the ride's director Takashi Yamazaki. This version of Ghidorah is first seen ravaging the city with his Gravity Beams, and is spotted by a Japanese Self-Defense Force (JSDF) soldier, Ghidorah's enemy Godzilla arrives in the city approaching from the sea. The unnamed JSDF soldier delivers a safety briefing just before Ghidorah smashes in a wall of the theatre and roars at the guests, only to fly away. Ghidorah's Gravity Beams strike a building near the lead vehicle, crushing it with rubble. Ghidorah lands in front of the vehicle, but it drives between his legs. He gives chase, trying and failing to bite it with all three of his heads. Finally he flies ahead of it, lands, and charges forward at full speed. The vehicle soon reverses and hides in the shell of a building, but Ghidorah soon finds the vehicle and snatches it up in the jaws of his middle head. As he flies off from Japan, Rodan shows up and attacks head-on. Ghidorah repulses the new attacker, but drops the vehicle.

The vehicle then deploys its parachutes as the monsters clash each other. Ghidorah prevails easily, throwing Rodan to the ground before assailing the smaller winged kaiju with gravity beams. He then breaks the top of the Tokyo Tower off, which the vehicle narrowly avoids, as Godzilla arrives in the city and meets up with Ghidorah. They both roar a challenge and the vehicle lands on Godzilla's side and climbs up his shoulder before driving down his tail, soaring into the air once more, and landing on a roof. Ghidorah throws Godzilla to the ground near the building, forcing the vehicle to drive off the roof and deploy parachutes again. Godzilla grabs Ghidorah by the heads and throws him towards the vehicle, which just slips through a gap between his wing and leg.

Ghidorah recovers and pounces, but Godzilla intercepts Ghidorah with a powerful blast of atomic breath, suspending him in mid-air and blasting a hole through his chest. Godzilla roars in victory as the vehicle lands, one of Ghidorah's still-living heads then shows up out of nowhere and keeps attempting to attack the vehicle. Godzilla squishes the final head of Ghidorah, splashing blue blood fluid and brains everywhere, ending Ghidorah and resulting in Godzilla roaring a victory.

==== Fest Godzilla shorts (2023–2024) ====
In 2023 and 2024, King Ghidorah was featured in the Fest Godzilla shorts Fest Godzilla 4: Operation Jet Jaguar and Fest Godzilla 5: All Monsters Showdown as an alien threat that forces Godzilla and Jet Jaguar to work together. He is depicted through the use of a refurbished GMK Ghidorah suit.

==== Godzilla Minus Zero (2026) ====
King Ghidorah, as depicted in Godzilla Minus Zero

In Godzilla Minus Zero (2026) King Ghidorah starts out in a liquid form from a Meteor that crash lands in Japan, and by absorbing the D.N.A of other animals slowly transforms into a one-headed Dragon. It attacks Matsumoto City. With help from the United States the Disaster Response Bureau attempt to kill King Ghidorah with a new fuel-air bomb and "Narukami rods", metallic spears that conduct lightning. This leads King Ghidorah to evolve into his three-headed form, giving him the power to lift heavy objects with his gravity beam and generate hurricane-force winds. When it is discovered that Godzilla has returned, the Disaster Response Bureau's new plan is to have Godzilla and King Ghidorah to fight to the death, with the victor presumably being weakened to the point that the United States Armed Forces will be able to kill them. When Godzilla and King Ghidorah fight, Godzilla is defeated, though both sustain heavy injuries. The bureau manages to temporarily trap King Ghidorah by freezing him in liquid nitrogen, allowing Godzilla to recover. King Ghidorah eats Godzilla's severed arm and gains heat ray powers but is unable to control them, allowing Godzilla to kill King Ghidorah with his own.

=== Monsterverse (2019–2021) ===
Ghidorah, as he appears in Godzilla: King of the Monsters (2019)

In 2014, Legendary Pictures announced their acquisition of the licenses to Rodan, Mothra and King Ghidorah from Toho to use in their Monsterverse franchise. The trio were introduced in Kong: Skull Island in a post-credits scene depicting cave paintings of all three monsters, including Godzilla.

In June 2017, a press release confirmed Rodan, Mothra, and King Ghidorah would all be featured in Godzilla: King of the Monsters. In April 2018, Jason Liles, Alan Maxson, and Richard Dorton were cast to provide the motion capture performances of the heads of King Ghidorah, with Liles performing the middle head, Maxson performing the right head, and Dorton performing the left head. Other actors would perform the rest of King Ghidorah's body.

This version of Ghidorah stands 521 feet (158.8 meters) tall, weighing 141,056 tons with an unknown wingspan that allows him to fly at a maximum speed of 550 knots. Unlike previous incarnations of the character, Ghidorah's three heads are portrayed with independent personalities from each other, although Ghidorah overall still exhibits the inherent sadism of most incarnations: the middle head is the leader and more prominently sadistic than the other two, the right head is angry and thirsty for battle, and the left head is curious, distractable and more submissive — the heads are officially named Ichi, Ni and San respectively (meaning "One", "Two" and "Three" in Japanese). He is referred to as "Monster Zero" (a reference to Invasion of Astro-Monster) by the organization Monarch. According to Monarch's database, ancient civilizations called the monster "Ghidorah".

In this incarnation, King Ghidorah is portrayed as a rival apex predator to Godzilla that originated from another world, "failing from the stars" in ancient times, who actively seeks to usurp Godzilla's domination of the other monsters, proving to be different from most of the known titans due to being actively murderous and genocidal towards humans while threatening to destroy Earth's ecosphere. It's briefly speculated by the characters that Ghidorah's motives behind the destruction are xenoforming Earth to his own liking, though the novelization briefly suggests when discussing said theory that maybe Ghidorah has no higher end-goal than hatefully murdering every living thing that isn't him.

Referenced in various myths and said to be the inspiration for the beasts in humanity's various Chaoskampf stories, King Ghidorah is shown through ancient cave paintings to have fought against Godzilla and/or his species in the past before, but his nature scared ancient humans enough that the info contained in those myths was left incomplete. King Ghidorah ended up being frozen in Antarctica, discovered by Monarch who proceeded to study the monster until he was freed by eco-terrorists led by Alan Jonah. Godzilla is attracted to Ghidorah's activity and they engage in a short battle, but Ghidorah retreats when Monarch's military forces intervene; proceeding to Mexico once he senses Rodan being awoken from his own hibernation inside a volcano.

Ghidorah forces Rodan into submission but is then attacked by Godzilla again, who manages to gain the upper hand by dragging the flying Titan into the ocean. Godzilla is nearly victorious after completely biting off Ghidorah's left head, but in desperation, the human military attempts to kill both Ghidorah and Godzilla by detonating a new weapon called the Oxygen Destroyer. Caught in the blast's center, the weapon almost kills Godzilla but is revealed to have no effect on Ghidorah, who flies back to land and within minutes, fully regenerates his severed head, which would eventually allow the humans to deduce that he is in fact an alien with a completely different biology than any known lifeform on Earth. With Godzilla seemingly defeated, Ghidorah becomes the new "alpha" or "king of the monsters", and puts out a worldwide call that awakens all of the Earth's Titans, and commands them to aid him in destroying human civilization and inflicting an extinction event that could wipe out all multicellular life on Earth, with Rodan as his right hand. Ghidorah even starts causing massive electrical storms in the eastern United States, radically altering climate conditions.

When Ghidorah comes to Boston to destroy the Orca device that is negating his hold over the Titans, he battles a revived Godzilla while Mothra fights Rodan. This time, Ghidorah defeats Godzilla after empowering himself by feeding on the city's energy supply and throwing Godzilla from a high altitude, but is stopped from killing him thanks to distractions from Mothra (who is killed by Ghidorah in an act of self-sacrifice which enables Godzilla to absorb her life force) and the humans (who use the Orca to distract Ghidorah from sucking Godzilla dry before the latter could use Mothra's power boost). Godzilla recovers and uses Mothra's power to unleash a series of thermonuclear pulses that obliterate Ghidorah, severing his wings and heads. A reverted Godzilla later destroys Ghidorah’s last head with his atomic breath. In a post-credits scene, Jonah and his men are shown Ghidorah's previously severed head from a fisherman in Mexico. He tells the fisherman, "We'll take it."

The tie-in Godzilla vs. Kong graphic novel Kingdom Kong reveals that Ghidorah's passage over Mexico during Rodan's awakening left an isolated version of his hurricane anchored above the ocean, even after Ghidorah's death has enabled the rest of Earth's climate to re-stabilize. 2 years later, this storm is drawn towards Skull Island amid the Titan Camazotz' invasion of the island via the Hollow Earth, and it permanently merges with the perpetual storm barrier surrounding Skull Island, enveloping Skull Island in an endless superstorm which effectively destroys all unprotected life on the island after Camazotz is defeated.

In the 2021 sequel, Godzilla vs. Kong, set five years after the events of King of the Monsters, Ghidorah's severed head is being used by Apex Cybernetics' Ren Serizawa (portrayed by Shun Oguri) to telepathically interface with Mechagodzilla's body. Godzilla senses his fallen rival's presence, which prompts him to attack the Apex facilities where Mechagodzilla is being built. Eventually, what's left of Ghidorah's consciousness takes control of the cybernetic Titan, killing Apex CEO Walter Simmons and electrocuting Ren Serizawa, before battling Godzilla in Hong Kong. Ghidorah's influence on Mechagodzilla is evident from his desire for unabridged destruction and the senseless killing of humans. Mechagodzilla and Ghidorah's consciousness were finally destroyed by the combined efforts of Godzilla and Kong. In the novelization, Ren's death is changed so that instead of being electrocuted, his mind is trapped inside Mechagodzilla and overwritten by the Ghidorah-derived mind, and the novel drops hints that Ghidorah's consciousness may have possessed Ren's body and escaped afterwards.

== In other media ==
The various incarnations of King Ghidorah appeared in other media associated with the series, such as video games, television shows, and comics.

=== In video games ===
King Ghidorah's appearance in video games after 1991 usually utilizes his Heisei design, combined with traits from other versions.

In the Pipeworks trilogy (Godzilla: Destroy All Monsters Melee, Godzilla: Save the Earth, and Godzilla: Unleashed) and the Godzilla game for PlayStation 4, both King Ghidorah and his mechanized counterpart appear as playable characters and enemies.

The eighth level of Kyoei Toshi, a 2017 PS4 game where players, as civilians, must escape and survive kaiju attacks, features the Heisei versions of Godzilla and King Ghidorah shooting and biting at each other next to a building the player must enter to retrieve an important package.

In 2024, King Ghidorah and Hedorah were added as downloadable guest fighters in the indie game GigaBash, coming two years after Gigan, Godzilla, Mechagodzilla (specifically "Kiryu", the Millennium Era version), and Destoroyah were introduced as DLCs to the game. Although presented with its Heisei appearance, King Ghidorah also includes traits from its Showa and Monsterverse counterparts in attacks, taunts, and backstory (as he is stated to be an alien invader).

As of 2026, the mobile game Godzilla: Battle Line includes Desghidorah, Keizer Ghidorah, Mecha-King Ghidorah and all versions of the standard King Ghidorah (including the one from Godzilla the Ride: Giant Monsters Ultimate Battle) except the Showa version.

King Ghidorah appears as a figurine in the limited-time Godzilla DLC for Dave the Diver, which ran from May 23 to November 22, 2024.

=== Television ===
Stock footage of King Ghidorah from Ghidorah, the Three-Headed Monster was used in four episodes of Courage the Cowardly Dog: Courage in the Big Stinkin' City, The Tower of Dr. Zalost, Fishy Business and Nowhere TV. Mostly serving a small role in harmless jumpscares and background footage, the kaiju briefly shoots fire at Courage through a television.

== Appearances ==
King Ghidorah appeared in a brief piece of stock footage in Terror of Mechagodzilla. The mechanical head of Mecha-King Ghidorah appears briefly in the opening of Godzilla vs. Mechagodzilla II. Spin-off characters based on King Ghidorah (although quadrupedal in appearance) were featured in other Toho films: Desghidorah in Rebirth of Mothra and Keizer Ghidorah in Godzilla: Final Wars. A post-credits scene in Kong: Skull Island depicts cave paintings of Godzilla, Rodan, Mothra and King Ghidorah. It was implied that King Ghidorah took over Mechagodzilla's consciousness in Godzilla vs. Kong.

=== Films ===
- Ghidorah, the Three-Headed Monster (1964)
- Invasion of Astro-Monster (1965)
- Destroy All Monsters (1968)
- Godzilla vs. Gigan (1972)
- Godzilla vs. King Ghidorah (1991)
- Godzilla vs. Mechagodzilla II (1993)
- Rebirth of Mothra III (1998)
- Godzilla, Mothra and King Ghidorah: Giant Monsters All-Out Attack (2001)
- Godzilla: Final Wars (2004; toy)
- Godzilla: City on the Edge of Battle (2018)
- Godzilla: The Planet Eater (2018)
- Godzilla: King of the Monsters (2019)
- Godzilla Minus Zero (2026)

=== Television ===
- Zone Fighter (1973)
- Godzilla Island (1997 - 1998)
- Godzilland (1992 - 1993)
- Godziban (present)

=== Video games ===
- Godzilla: Monster of Monsters! (NES - 1988)
- Godzilla (Game Boy - 1990)
- Godzilla 2: War of the Monsters (NES - 1991)
- Battle Soccer: Field no Hasha (SNES - 1992)
- Super Godzilla (SNES - 1993)
- Kaijū-ō Godzilla / King of the Monsters, Godzilla (Game Boy - 1993)
- Godzilla: Battle Legends (Turbo Duo - 1993)
- Godzilla: Monster War / Godzilla: Destroy All Monsters (Super Famicom - 1994)
- Godzilla Giant Monster March (Game Gear - 1995)
- Godzilla Trading Battle (PlayStation - 1998)
- Godzilla Generations: Maximum Impact (Dreamcast - 1999)
- Godzilla: Destroy All Monsters Melee (GCN, Xbox - 2002/2003)
- Godzilla: Domination! (GBA - 2002)
- Godzilla: Save the Earth (Xbox, PS2 - 2004)
- Godzilla: Unleashed (Wii, PS2 - 2007)
- Godzilla Unleashed: Double Smash (NDS - 2007)
- Godzilla (PS3 - 2014 PS3 PS4 - 2015)
- City Shrouded in Shadow (PS4 - 2017)
- Godzilla Defense Force (2019)
- Unnamed MonsterVerse Mobile Game (2019)
- Godzilla Battle Line (2021)
- GigaBash (PS4, PS5, Steam, Epic Games - 2024)

=== Literature ===
- Godzilla vs. King Ghidorah (manga 1991)
- Godzilla Saves America: A Monster Showdown in 3-D! (1996)
- Godzilla 2000 (novel 1997)
- Godzilla vs. the Robot Monsters (novel 1998)
- Godzilla vs. the Space Monster (novel 1998)
- Godzilla: Kingdom of Monsters (comic 2011 - 2012)
- Godzilla: Gangsters & Goliaths (comic 2011)
- Godzilla: Legends (comic 2011 - 2012)
- Godzilla: The Half-Century War (comic 2012 - 2013)
- Godzilla: Rulers of Earth (comic 2013 - 2015)
- Godzilla: Cataclysm (comic 2014)
- Godzilla in Hell (comic 2015)
- Godzilla: Oblivion (comic 2016)
- Godzilla Rivals (comic 2022)
- Godzilla vs. The Mighty Morphin Power Rangers (comic 2022)

== Cultural impact ==
=== Music ===
In 2003, British-American hip hop artist Daniel Dumile (known primarily as MF Doom) released the album Take Me To Your Leader, under the alias "King Geedorah". The album's cover art features an illustration resembling King Ghidorah, and the album features samples from the English versions of various Godzilla films. Doom also went under "King Geedorah" when he was in the group Monsta Island Czars.

King Ghidorah is also the namesake for King Giddra, a Japanese hip hop group which was sporadically active between 1993 and 2003.

=== Biology ===
In 2022, a species of branching worm was named after the monster, Ramisyllis kingghidorahi, discovered in the waters around Sado Island. According to scientist Maria Teresa Aguado, the name was selected as "King Ghidorah is a branching fictitious animal that can regenerate his lost heads, so we thought this was an appropriate name for the new species of branching worm".

=== Internet memes ===
In 2019, following the release of Godzilla: King of the Monsters, digital artist Michael J. Larson published a humorous fan art of King Ghidorah, depicting two of his heads with serious, menacing expressions, while the third makes a goofy face. Subsequently known as the "Three-Headed Dragon" meme, the image was widely reused with labels added next to each of King Ghidorah's heads, representing any set of three items where the third is argued to be noticeably inferior in quality to the other two.

== Reception ==
The character has been well-received and is considered to be the most famous enemy of Godzilla. IGN listed the creature as #2 on their "Top 10 Japanese Movie Monsters" list. Complex listed the character as #4 on its "The 15 Most Badass Kaiju Monsters of All Time" list, calling him "iconic" and saying that he"... simply looks cooler than some of the more powerful bugs, crabs, and robots."

In his review of Ghidorah, the Three-Headed Monster, Ethan Reed of Toho Kingdom praised King Ghidorah, calling him"a fantastic addition to the franchise" and "no less than pure evil, a relentless force of destruction that wipes out the life of entire planets just for the sake of it" and concluded that "King Ghidorah is not only one of the best characters in the series, but one of the best movie villains as well." Similar views were expressed in Paste, which listed Ghidorah as #5 on its "10 Best Movie Dragons", describing him as "probably the deadliest beast in all of Godzilla lore".

Godzilla historian Steve Ryfle, however, has criticized Ghidorah's design in Godzilla vs. King Ghidorah, citing his stiff movements and recycled Rodan roar, as well as noting that it did not deviate enough from Eiji Tsuburaya's original design.

Following the release of King of the Monsters, Ghidorah's left head has gained the nickname "Kev/Kevin". This was following an announcement by Mike Dougherty who released a tweet with the names of Ghidorah's head. Due to his seemingly unique personality, Kevin has become the subject of memes.

== See also ==
- Hydreigon

== Works cited ==
- Honda, Ishiro (1975). Terror of Mechagodzilla. Toho Co., Ltd.
- Okawara, Takao (1993). Godzilla vs. Mechagodzilla II. Toho Co., Ltd.
- Ryfle, Steve (1998). Japan's Favorite Mon-Star: The Unauthorized Biography of the Big G. ECW Press. ISBN 1550223488.
- Yoneda, Okihiro (1998). Rebirth of Mothra III. Toho Co., Ltd.
- Cohen, David (2000). Courage the Cowardly Dog - Episode 15: Courage in the Big Stinkin' City. Warner Bros. Television.
- Cohen, David (2001). Courage the Cowardly Dog - Episode 20: Nowhere TV. Warner Bros. Television.
- Dilworth, John R. (2001). Courage the Cowardly Dog - Episode 27: The Tower of Dr. Zalost. Warner Bros. Television.
- Jess-Cooke, Carolyn (2012). Film Sequels: Theory and Practice from Hollywood to Bollywood (First ed.). Edinburgh University Press. ISBN 9780748689477.
- Kalat, David (2010). A Critical History and Filmography of Toho's Godzilla Series (2nd ed.). McFarland. ISBN 9780786447497.
- Ragone, August (May 6, 2014). Eiji Tsuburaya: Master of Monsters (paperback ed.). Chronicle Books. ISBN 9781452135397.
- Solomon, Brian (2017). Godzilla FAQ: All That's Left to Know About the King of the Monsters. Applause Theatre & Cinema Books. ISBN 9781495045684.
- Rhoads, Sean; McCorkle, Brooke (2018). Japan's Green Monsters: Environmental Commentary in Kaiju Cinema. McFarland. ISBN 9781476663906.
- Shizuno, Kobun; Seshita, Hiroyuki (2018). Godzilla: City on the Edge of Battle. Toho Co., Ltd.
- Brykczynski, Ben (2019). Godzilla: A Comprehensive Guide. Blurb Inc.
- Skipper, Graham (2022). Godzilla: The Official Guide to the King of the Monsters (in English and Japanese). Welbeck Publishing. p. 219. ISBN 9781802790009.
