= Godzilla (comics) =

Godzilla in comics

Godzilla has appeared in a range of comic books that have been published in Japan and the United States.

== Japanese Godzilla comics ==
Godzilla battles Hedorah on the cover of the 1971 Japanese manga adaptation of Godzilla vs. Hedorah

In his native Japan, Godzilla has been featured in various comic books since his inception in 1954. These comics, for the most part, were black-and-white publications known as manga. The vast majority of these comics were adaptations of the films. Every film from Godzilla to Godzilla 2000: Millennium received a comic book adaptation with the exception of King Kong vs. Godzilla. In addition, all of the films from Godzilla vs. Megaguirus to Godzilla: Final Wars did not receive a comic book adaptation.

For the most part, there were anywhere from two to four different adaptations of each film; for example, the first comic adaptation of Godzilla vs. Biollante was called Godzilla 1990, while the second adaptation of Godzilla vs. Mothra was called Godzilla vs. Mothra: Great Study. Most of these comics (in particular, the comics from the 1950s to the 1970s) were published in children's magazines such as Bokura, Bouken Oh and Shonen, while others were published in Yellow Pages-sized weekly or monthly publications, while still others were published as one-shots and sold in movie theaters. Many of the latter comics (the 1980s to the 1990s) were published by Shogakukan Comics, Tentomushi Comics and Kodansha Comics. In the early 1990s, many of the original adaptations from the original series of Godzilla films were compiled into two pocketbook-sized volumes and reprinted by Bamboo Books. In 1992, Bamboo would reprint Godzilla's battles with King Ghidorah from earlier manga into a collection called Battle History of Godzilla vs. King Ghidorah.

Most of the time these adaptations would deviate from the original films and flesh out characters or add scenarios to the stories that were not present in the original films. Outside these adaptations, many of the original Godzilla films also received Asahi Sonorama book-and-record sets. These illustrated comic-style book-and-record sets featured painted artwork within.

Outside these adaptations, Godzilla was also featured in original stories as well. A sequel story to the original film was published in 1955 called The Last Godzilla, while a sequel story to Godzilla Raids Again was published in 1958 called Godzilla Continued: Anguirus Strikes Back. In 1979, the Japanese edition of Starlog featured a two-part illustrated story written by Katsuhiro Otomo called A Space Godzilla. Part 1 was featured in issue No. 4 ("Farewell Earth"), while Part 2 was featured in issue No. 6 ("Return to the Stars"). In 1990 an anthology-style comic, featuring different stories by different writers and artists, was published and called The Godzilla Comic. This was followed in 1991 by a second anthology-style comic, also featuring different stories by different writers and artists, called The Godzilla Comic Raids Again: Gigantis the Fire Comic. These two comics featured varying styles of stories, which ranged from typical Godzilla stories to comedic stories, violent stories and even "adult"-themed stories that contained nudity.

In 2014, to coincide with the 60th anniversary of Godzilla and the 40th anniversary of the company's own Big Comic Original Magazine, Shogakukan Inc. released the comic Big Comic Original Godzilla Special Issue. This one-shot comic featured 21 Godzilla-themed comic stories from the industry's top manga artists and writers.

In 2018, Toho produced a manga serial published in Shōnen Jump+ based on the film Godzilla: Planet of the Monsters.

In 2025, a manga serial titled Godzilla Galaxy Odyssey by Ju Ishiguchi began publishing in Young Champion.

== US Godzilla comics ==
Through the years since 1976, there have been various U.S. Godzilla comics published by different comic book publishing companies. These range from promotional comics to comics published by large mainstream comic companies such as Marvel Comics.

=== Godzilla vs. Megalon comic ===
The first Godzilla comic published in the United States was actually a small promotional comic. In the summer of 1976 (as part of the publicity promoting the upcoming U.S. release of the film Godzilla vs. Megalon), a small four-page comic book adaptation was published by Cinema Shares International Distribution Corp. and given away for free at movie theaters. The comic featured no credits (so the artist and writer are unknown) and featured no cover. It was magazine-sized and published on newsprint. The comic is infamous for getting names of two of the major characters wrong, as Jet Jaguar is referred to as "Robotman" and Gigan is referred to as "Borodan".

=== Dark Horse Comics ===
Godzilla rises from a stormy sea. From Godzilla, King of the Monsters (vol. #3) No. 10 by Dark Horse Comics

In 1987, Dark Horse Comics acquired the rights to Godzilla and for the next 12 years published various comic books and trade paperbacks based on the character. These ran the gamut from back-up stories in anthology titles, to one-shots, to miniseries, to an ongoing series, as well as various reprints in the trade paperback format. In 1987, they published a black and white one-shot comic called Godzilla, King of the Monsters Special #1. Between 1988 and 1989, Dark Horse published a six-issue miniseries simply called Godzilla. It was a translated version of the Japanese manga of the film The Return of Godzilla, which was based on the Japanese version of the film rather than the Americanized version, Godzilla 1985. This series was reprinted in the trade paperback Godzilla, which was issued in 1990 and then reissued in 1995. It was then reprinted in color as the miniseries Dark Horse Classics: Terror of Godzilla #1–6 from 1998 to 1999.

In 1992, an illustration of Godzilla (provided by Arthur Adams) was published in San Diego Comic-Con Comics #1. Also that same year the one-shot issue Godzilla Color Special #1 was published. It would be reprinted as simply Dark Horse Classics: Godzilla #1 in 1998.

In 1993, Godzilla was featured in the anthology series Dark Horse Comics in issues #10-11(parts of Dark Horse Comics #10's story and artwork would be slightly altered twice in both Godzilla, King of the Monsters #0 and the trade paperback Godzilla: Age of Monsters). That same year, Godzilla was also featured in a pair of one-shot comics, Urban Legends #1, which dispels the dual ending myth from the film King Kong vs. Godzilla, and Godzilla vs. Barkley, which was based on the TV commercial Godzilla vs. Charles Barkley. The latter comic was also published in Japan.

In 1995, Godzilla appeared in the one-shot comic Godzilla versus Hero Zero. That same year Godzilla starred in a second ongoing series called Godzilla, King of the Monsters that ran from issues #0–16. This series was published from 1995 to 1996. The series features several new monsters for Godzilla to battle and a story arc in which Godzilla was flung through time by a would-be archvillain, who uses him to cause both the 1906 San Francisco earthquake and the sinking of the RMS Titanic, as well as battle the Spanish Armada. Godzilla would then be flung into the far-flung future as well and would rampage across it before returning to the modern day. The last issue of the Dark Horse series sees Godzilla flung back into time to just a few hours before the asteroid which supposedly destroyed the dinosaurs impacted on Earth, and fighting an alien creature. This issue first seems to have an "it was all a dream" ending, as Godzilla wakes from his slumber in the modern day. But then a twist is thrown into the ending: Godzilla is shown staring at a piece of his opponent's tail that is still in his hand from where he had ripped it off in the final moments of their battle before the impact.

In 1996, Godzilla appeared in the anthology series Dark Horse Presents in issue #106, as well as in issue #4 of the four-issue miniseries A Decade of Dark Horse. Also that same year, some of the earlier published material was reprinted in the trade paperback Art Adams' Creature Features.

Finally, in 1998, Godzilla appeared in trade paperbacks and miniseries that were simply reprinting earlier material. This included the miniseries Dark Horse Classics: Godzilla-King of the Monsters #1–6 and the trade paperbacks Godzilla: Age of Monsters and Godzilla: Past Present Future.

=== Trendmasters Godzilla comics ===
In 1994, Trendmasters toys published a mini-comic called Godzilla, King of the Monsters that came packaged with some of the figures from their Godzilla toy line.

=== Fox Kids Magazine Godzilla comics ===
In 1998, Fox Kids Magazine featured two Godzilla: The Series comics to promote the animated series, one based upon the three-part episode "Monster War" and the other being an original story.

=== IDW Publishing ===
A painted cover of Godzilla attacking a city by Alex Ross. From Godzilla: Kingdom of Monsters #1 (March 2011) from IDW Publishing

==== Ongoing main series ====
In 2010, IDW Publishing obtained the comic book rights for the license of the Godzilla franchise. Unlike the two previous companies who licensed Godzilla, IDW was able to acquire the rights to many other Toho movie monsters from Toho International (which is the American branch of Toho co.). These include Anguirus, Rodan, Mothra, King Ghidorah, Kumonga, Hedorah, Gigan, Mechagodzilla, Titanosaurus, Battra, SpaceGodzilla, Destoroyah, Moguera, Varan, Manda, Baragon, Gaira, Sanda, Ebirah, Kamacuras, Gorosaurus, Gezora, Kamoebas, Jet Jaguar, Megalon, King Caesar, Biollante, Mecha-King Ghidorah, Orga, Megaguirus, and Zilla. As well as these licensed monsters, IDW introduced a new group of monsters called the Trilopods. Created by artist Matt Frank, these monsters are based on the prehistoric arthropods called trilobites.

From March 2011 to February 2012, IDW published their first Godzilla series, a 12-issue series called Godzilla: Kingdom of Monsters. The series launched with a painted cover by Alex Ross, as well as a record 100 variant covers of issue #1 that were mostly retailer incentives. This promotion allowed 100 U.S. comic book store owners to have personalized variants featuring their store being demolished by Godzilla's foot if they each ordered over 500 copies of issue #1. As a result, Godzilla: Kingdom of Monsters #1 was thus able to sell out its 1st printing. In August 2011, IDW released a one-shot issue called Godzilla: Kingdom of Monsters 100-Cover Charity Spectacular. The issue featured all 100 of the unique covers of the comic book store-smashing variants of issue #1 via a cover gallery. Proceeds from the sale of the issue went to benefit the International Medical Corps for tsunami relief in Japan. In September 2011, IDW began collecting the series as a three-volume trade paperback series. In July 2019, the entire series was collected as a deluxe trade paperback.

From May 2012 to May 2013, IDW published a second ongoing series, simply called Godzilla. The series ran 13 issues. In November 2012, IDW collected the series as a three-volume trade paperback series. In April 2014, the entire series was collected as a deluxe trade paperback called Godzilla: History's Greatest Monster.

From June 2013 to June 2015, IDW published a third ongoing series called Godzilla: Rulers of Earth, which ran 25 issues. The publisher began collecting the series as a six-volume trade paperback series in December 2013. In June 2016, they started to recollect the series as a two-volume deluxe trade paperback series, with the first volume called Godzilla: Complete Rulers of Earth. In August 2019 the second volume, called Godzilla: Complete Rulers of Earth 2, was released.

Godzilla: The Kai-Sei Era is a line of comics established into a shared universe which launch in July 2025. This was announced by IDW and Toho after renewing their partnership to 2029. The line initially consists of three books: Godzilla by Tim Seeley and Nikola Čižmešija, Godzilla: Enter the Deadzone by Ethan S. Parker and Griffin Sheridan and Pablo Tunica, and Spaceship Godzilla by Chris Gooch and Oliver Ono. IDW's Godzilla line editor Jake Williams said, "The Kai-Sei era is the only ongoing Godzilla story of its kind – crafted for comic readers who have never bought a Godzilla book, and Godzilla fans who have never read a comic. We aim to bring you the absolute best stories possible – whether those stories contain super powered G-Force members trying to kill Godzilla, mutants in a wasteland trying to survive in its wake, or mercenaries flying around space in Mechagodzilla. Every month readers will be able to take a peek inside a brand-new universe composed of unimaginable horrors, kaiju old and new, and heroes to keep it all at bay. We’re telling the best Godzilla stories in the world, inside the best comics on the shelves."

==== Miniseries ====
Outside of the ongoing main series, IDW has also published seven five-issue miniseries. They first published a five-issue miniseries called Godzilla: Gangsters & Goliaths from June – October 2011. The miniseries was then collected as a trade paperback in November 2011.

A second five-issue miniseries called Godzilla: Legends was published from November 2011 – March 2012. The miniseries was then collected as a trade paperback in June 2012.

A third five-issue miniseries called Godzilla: The Half-Century War was published from August – December 2012. The miniseries was then collected as a trade paperback in May 2013. The miniseries was then collected again as a hardcover book, with additional artwork, in July 2015. In October 2016, issue #1 was reprinted as Godzilla: The Half-Century War – Greatest Hits #1.

A fourth five-issue miniseries called Godzilla: Cataclysm was published from August – December 2014. The miniseries was then collected as a trade paperback in March 2015.

A fifth five-issue miniseries called Godzilla In Hell was published from July – November 2015. Issues #1 and 2 of the miniseries both went into a second and third printing, while issue #3 went into a second printing. The miniseries was then collected as a trade paperback in February 2016.

A sixth five-issue miniseries called Godzilla: Oblivion (which was originally going to be titled Godzilla: World's End) was published from March – July 2016. The miniseries was then collected as a trade paperback in October 2016.

A seventh five-issue miniseries called Godzilla: Rage Across Time was published from August – November 2016. This series took the form of an anthology with Godzilla and other kaiju impacting various events across history. Issue #1 went into a second printing. The miniseries was then collected as a trade paperback in December 2016.

An eighth five-issue miniseries called Godzilla: Monsters & Protectors was published from April – July 2021, aimed at a younger audience. This was followed by a five issue sequel subtitled All Hail the King that ran from October 2022-February 2023 and a one-shot conclusion titled Summer Smash in July 2023.

Godzilla: Here There Be Dragons, a five-issue miniseries pitting Godzilla against Sir Francis Drake, ran from June–November 2023. It was followed by Godzilla: Here There Be Dragons II - Sons of Giants, which ran from June–November 2024, which focused on a secret society of kaiju worshippers covering up their existence led by Thomas Jefferson. A conclusion to the trilogy Godzilla: Here There Be Aliens is set to begin releasing in May 2025.

Godzilla: War for Humanity was a five issue miniseries published from August 2023-May 2024, pitting Godzilla against an infectious fungus kaiju called Zoospora.

Godzilla: Skate or Die was a five issue miniseries that was published from June to November 2024, focused on a group of Australian teenagers having to deal with their skate park being in the crossfire of a battle between Godzilla and Varan.

Godzilla's Monsterpiece Theatre was a three issue miniseries by Tom Scioli that ran from October 2024 to January 2025 pitting Godzilla against Jay Gatsby, Sherlock Holmes, the protagonist of The Time Machine, Dracula, and Frankenstein's monster. It would be followed in 2026 by the anthology series Godzilla's Monsterpiece Theatre Presents, which placed Godzilla into different stories each issue consisting of Romeo and Juliet, The Odyssey, War of the Worlds and The Wonderful Wizard of Oz with Scioli providing a serialized Godzilla vs. Robin Hood story as a backup feature.

Godzilla: Heist is a five issue miniseries written by Van Jensen and illustrated by Kelsey Ramsay published on Jan 13, 2026. The story follows Jai, a thief that can summon Godzilla to his location, staging high-stakes heists using Godzilla as a distraction.

Sonic the Hedgehog X Godzilla is a crossover miniseries with IDW Publishing's Sonic the Hedgehog comic series and set to release in 2026.

==== One-shots ====
In June 2014, IDW published a one-shot issue called Godzilla: The IDW Era. This one-shot issue gave a brief overview of all the various IDW Godzilla series and miniseries that had been published over the past three years.

In June 2016, a one-shot collection called Godzilla Treasury Edition was released. This one-shot collection features reprints of some of James Stokoe's artwork and covers from the various IDW series and miniseries.

Godzilla Rivals is a quarterly series of one-shot comics, each focusing on Godzilla battling a different monster. The first installment of the series was released on June 30, 2021.

Godzilla vs. America is a anthology series of one-shots, each focused on Godzilla attacking a different American city with stories by area artists. The first issue set in Chicago was released in February 2025. The second issue, based around Los Angeles was released in April 2025 with all proceeds going towards recovery efforts from the January 2025 Southern California wildfires. The third issue, released in July 2025, is set in Boston and the fourth issue released in October 2025 is set in Kansas City, Missouri. The fifth entry was released in March 2026, set in Portland, Oregon. The sixth entry will release in May 2026 and break from the city formula in favor of showcasing the entire state of Texas.

=== Legendary Comics ===
In May 2014, Legendary Comics released Godzilla: Awakening, a graphic novel prequel to the MonsterVerse film Godzilla (2014). It was written by Max and Greg Borenstein and featured art by Eric Battle, Yvel Gluchet and Alan Quah. In September (to coincide with the film's home video release), the novel was reissued as a trade paperback. Characters from the graphic novel would later be adapted to live-action media in the 2023 television series Monarch: Legacy of Monsters.

In October 2018, Legendary announced plans for a graphic novel prequel to Godzilla: King of the Monsters titled Godzilla: Aftershock. It was written by Arvid Nelson and illustrated by Drew Edward Johnson, and released on May 21, 2019.

In March 2021, Legendary published a graphic novel prequel to Godzilla vs. Kong titled Godzilla: Dominion.

A crossover between DC Comics' Justice League in Justice League vs. Godzilla vs. Kong

=== Godzilla vs. Cthulhu: A Death May Die Story ===
A one-shot comic to promote a comic-con exclusive gamepiece of Godzilla for Cthulhu: Death May Die where Godzilla battles Cthulhu.

== Collected U.S. editions ==
=== Marvel Comics ===
- Essential Godzilla, King of the Monsters (2006, collects Godzilla, King of the Monsters #1–24, ISBN 978-0785121534)
- Godzilla: The Original Marvel Years (2024, collects Godzilla, King of the Monsters #1–24, ISBN 978-1302958756)

=== Dark Horse Comics ===
- Godzilla (1995, collects Godzilla (vol. 2) #1–6, ISBN 978-1569710630)
- Godzilla: Age of Monsters (1998, collects Godzilla, King of the Monsters Special #1, Godzilla Color Special #1, Godzilla, King of the Monsters (vol. 3) #0–4, and 16, Godzilla versus Hero Zero #1, and a short story from Dark Horse Presents #106, ISBN 978-1569712771)
- Godzilla: Past Present Future (1998, collects Godzilla, King of the Monsters (vol. 3) #5–15 and a short story from A Decade of Dark Horse #4 of 4, ISBN 978-1569712788)

=== IDW Publishing ===
- Godzilla: Kingdom of Monsters
  - Volume One (2011, collects Godzilla: Kingdom of Monsters #1–4, ISBN 978-1613770160)
  - Volume Two (2012, collects Godzilla: Kingdom of Monsters #5–8, ISBN 978-1613771228)
  - Volume Three (2012, collects Godzilla: Kingdom of Monsters #9–12, ISBN 978-1613772058)
  - Godzilla: Kingdom of Monsters (2019, collects Godzilla: Kingdom of Monsters #1–12, ISBN 978-1684055333)
- Godzilla: Gangsters and Goliaths (2011, collects Godzilla: Gangsters and Goliaths #1–5, ISBN 978-1613770337)
- Godzilla: Legends (2012, collects Godzilla: Legends #1–5, ISBN 978-1613772232)
- Godzilla
  - Volume One (2012, collects Godzilla (vol. 4) #1–4, ISBN 978-1613774137)
  - Volume Two (2013, collects Godzilla (vol. 4) #5–8, ISBN 978-1613775844)
  - Volume Three (2013, collects Godzilla (vol. 4) #9–13, ISBN 978-1613776582)
  - Godzilla: History's Greatest Monster (2014, collects Godzilla (vol. 4) #1–13, ISBN 978-1613779484)
- Godzilla: The Half-Century War (2013, collects Godzilla: The Half-Century War #1–5, paperback ISBN 978-1613775950, hardcover ISBN 978-1631403217)
- Godzilla: Rulers of Earth
  - Volume One (2013, collects Godzilla: Rulers of Earth #1–4, ISBN 978-1613777497)
  - Volume Two (2014, collects Godzilla: Rulers of Earth #5–8, ISBN 978-1613779330)
  - Volume Three (2014, collects Godzilla: Rulers of Earth #9–12, ISBN 978-1631400094)
  - Volume Four (2014, collects Godzilla: Rulers of Earth #13–16, ISBN 978-1631401725)
  - Volume Five (2015, collects Godzilla: Rulers of Earth #17–20, ISBN 978-1631402814)
  - Volume Six (2015, collects Godzilla: Rulers of Earth #21–25, ISBN 978-1631404078)
  - Godzilla: Complete Rulers of Earth (2016, collects Godzilla: Rulers of Earth #1–12, ISBN 978-1631406263)
  - Godzilla: Complete Rulers of Earth 2 (2019, collects Godzilla: Rulers of Earth #13–25, ISBN 978-1684055050)
- Godzilla: Cataclysm (2015, collects Godzilla: Cataclysm #1–5, ISBN 978-1631402425)
- Godzilla in Hell (2016, collects Godzilla in Hell #1–5, ISBN 978-1631405341)
- Godzilla: Oblivion (2016, collects Godzilla: Oblivion #1–5, ISBN 978-1631407338)
- Godzilla: Rage Across Time (2016, collects Godzilla: Rage Across Time #1–5, ISBN 978-1631408533)
- Godzilla: Unnatural Disasters (2021, collects Godzilla: Legends #1–5, Godzilla in Hell #1–5, and Godzilla: Rage Across Time #1–5, ISBN 978-1684058266)
- Godzilla: World of Monsters (2021, collects Godzilla: Gangsters and Goliaths #1–5, Godzilla: Cataclysm #1–5, and Godzilla: Oblivion #1–5, ISBN 978-1684058303)
- Godzilla: Monsters & Protectors—Rise Up! (2022, collects Godzilla: Monsters & Protectors #1–5, ISBN 978-1684058723)
- Godzilla Rivals
  - Round One (2023, collects Godzilla Rivals #1–4, ISBN 978-1684059133)
- Godzilla vs. Mighty Morphin Power Rangers (2022, collects Godzilla vs. Mighty Morphin Power Rangers #1–5, ISBN 978-1684059379)
- Godzilla Library Collection Vol. 1 (2023, collects Godzilla: Gangsters and Goliaths #1–5, Godzilla: Legends #1–5, and Godzilla: The Half-Century War #1–5, ISBN 979-8887240329)
- Godzilla Library Collection Vol. 2 (2024, collects Godzilla: Kingdom of Monsters #1–12, ISBN 979-8887240701)

=== Legendary Comics ===
- Godzilla: Awakening (2014, Legendary, hardcover ISBN 978-1401250355, paperback ISBN 978-1401252526)
- Godzilla: Aftershock (2019, Legendary, ISBN 978-1681160535)
- Godzilla Dominion (2021, Legendary, ISBN 978-1681160788)
- Godzilla x Kong: The Hunted (2024, Legendary, ISBN 978-1681161280)

== See also ==
- Godzilla at the Comic Book DB (archived from the original)
- Godzilla at the Appendix to the Handbook of the Marvel Universe
