= List of Godzilla games =

Games based on Toho's Godzilla

This is a chronological list of games based on Toho's Godzilla franchise.

Since the early 1980s, a variety of video games have been developed and released on various platforms. The majority of these games were exclusively released in Japan, while others were either later released in internationally, or developed in the United States.

== Video games ==
=== Titles released in the 1980s ===
Game	Details
Godzilla vs. 3 Major Monsters Original release date(s): NA: 1984; EU: 1984; JP: 1984	Release years by system: 1984—MSX
Godzilla vs. 3 Major Monsters Original release date(s): NA: 1984; EU: 1984; JP: 1984	Notes: Developed by Bandai.; Published by Bandai.
Fierce Dragon Godzilla: Metropolis Destruction / Bōryū Gojira Daitoshi Kaimetsu Original release date(s): NA: 1985; EU: 1985; JP: 1985	Release years by system: 1985—FM-7, PC X-1
Fierce Dragon Godzilla: Metropolis Destruction / Bōryū Gojira Daitoshi Kaimetsu Original release date(s): NA: 1985; EU: 1985; JP: 1985	Notes: Developed by Bandai.; Published by Bandai.
Gojira-Kun Original release date(s): JP: 1985	Release years by system: 1985—MSX
Gojira-Kun Original release date(s): JP: 1985	Notes: Developed by Toho.; Published by Toho.; Based on the Godzilland anime.
The Movie Monster Game Original release date(s): NA: 1986; EU: 1986	Release years by system: 1986—Apple II, Commodore 64
The Movie Monster Game Original release date(s): NA: 1986; EU: 1986	Notes: Developed by Epyx.; Published by Epyx.
Monster's Fair Original release date(s): NA: 1986; EU: 1986; JP: 1986	Release years by system: 1986—MSX
Monster's Fair Original release date(s): NA: 1986; EU: 1986; JP: 1986	Notes: Developed by Toho.; Published by Toho.
Godzilla Challenge One Original release date(s):	Release years by system: 1987—Video Challenger
Godzilla Challenge One Original release date(s):	Notes: Developed by Takara Tomy.; Published by Takara Tomy.
Godzilla: Monster of Monsters! Original release date(s): NA: October 1989; EU: 1991; JP: December 9th 1988	Release years by system: 1988—NES/Famicom
Godzilla: Monster of Monsters! Original release date(s): NA: October 1989; EU: 1991; JP: December 9th 1988	Notes: Developed by Compile.; Published by Toho.

=== Titles released in the 1990s ===
Game	Details
Godzilla / Gojira-kun: Kaijū Daikōshin Original release date(s): NA: October 1990; EU: 1991; JP: December 18th 1990	Release years by system: 1990—Game Boy
Godzilla / Gojira-kun: Kaijū Daikōshin Original release date(s): NA: October 1990; EU: 1991; JP: December 18th 1990	Notes: Developed by Compile.; Published by Toho (Nintendo in Europe).
Circus Caper Original release date(s): NA: July 1990; JP: August 8th 1989	Release years by system: 1990—NES
Circus Caper Original release date(s): NA: July 1990; JP: August 8th 1989	Notes: Developed by Advance Communication Company.; Published by Toho.
Godzilla 2: War of the Monsters Original release date(s): NA: 1992	Release years by system: 1991—NES
Godzilla 2: War of the Monsters Original release date(s): NA: 1992	Notes: Developed and Published by Toho.
Battle Soccer: Field no Hasha / Battle Soccer: Champion of the Field Original release date(s): JP: December 11, 1992	Release years by system: 1992—SNES
Battle Soccer: Field no Hasha / Battle Soccer: Champion of the Field Original release date(s): JP: December 11, 1992	Notes: Developed by Pandora Box.; Published by Banpresto.
Godzilla Original release date(s): NA: 1993; EU: 1993; JP: 1993	Release years by system: 1993—NEC PC-9801
Godzilla Original release date(s): NA: 1993; EU: 1993; JP: 1993	Notes: Developed by SystemSoft.; Published by SystemSoft.
Super Godzilla Original release date(s): NA: July 1994; JP: December 23, 1993	Release years by system: 1993—SNES
Super Godzilla Original release date(s): NA: July 1994; JP: December 23, 1993	Notes: Developed by Advance Communication Company.; Published by Toho.
Godzilla Original release date(s): 1993	Release years by system: 1993—Arcade
Godzilla Original release date(s): 1993	Notes: Developed by Banpresto.; Published by Banpresto.
Kaijū-ō Godzilla / King of the Monsters, Godzilla Original release date(s): JP: December 17, 1993	Release years by system: 1993—Game Boy
Kaijū-ō Godzilla / King of the Monsters, Godzilla Original release date(s): JP: December 17, 1993	Notes: Developed by Bandai.; Published by Bandai.
Godzilla: Battle Legends Original release date(s): NA: 1993; EU: 1993; JP: 1993	Release years by system: 1993—Turbo Duo
Godzilla: Battle Legends Original release date(s): NA: 1993; EU: 1993; JP: 1993	Notes: Developed by Alpha System.; Published by Hudson Soft.
Godzilla Wars Jr. Original release date(s): NA: 1994; EU: 1994; JP: 1994	Release years by system: 1994—Arcade
Godzilla Wars Jr. Original release date(s): NA: 1994; EU: 1994; JP: 1994	Notes: Developed by Namco.; Published by Namco.
Godzilla: Monster War / Godzilla: Destroy All Monsters Original release date(s): NA: unreleased; EU: 1994; JP: 1994	Release years by system: 1994—Super Famicom
Godzilla: Monster War / Godzilla: Destroy All Monsters Original release date(s): NA: unreleased; EU: 1994; JP: 1994	Notes: Developed by Alfa System.; Published by Toho.
Godzilla: The Atomar Nightmare Original release date(s):	Release years by system: 1995—ZX Spectrum
Godzilla: The Atomar Nightmare Original release date(s):	Notes: Developed by Tiger's Claw.; Published by Tiger's Claw.
Godzilla: Heart-Pounding Monster Island Original release date(s):	Release years by system: 1995—Sega Pico, PC
Godzilla: Heart-Pounding Monster Island Original release date(s):	Notes: Developed by Sega.; Published by Sega.
Godzilla: Rettoushinkan / Godzilla: Archipelago Shock Original release date(s): JP: 1995	Release years by system: 1995—Saturn
Godzilla: Rettoushinkan / Godzilla: Archipelago Shock Original release date(s): JP: 1995	Notes: Co-Developed by Sega, Naxat Soft and Scarab.; Published by Sega.; Based upon the 1995 film Godzilla vs. Destoroyah.
Godzilla: Kaijuu no Daishingeki Original release date(s): JP: 1995	Release years by system: 1995—Game Gear
Godzilla: Kaijuu no Daishingeki Original release date(s): JP: 1995	Notes: Developed by SIMS Co., Ltd.; Published by Sega.
Godzilla Movie Studio Tour Original release date(s): NA: 1998; EU: 1998; JP: 1998	Release years by system: 1998—CD-ROM
Godzilla Movie Studio Tour Original release date(s): NA: 1998; EU: 1998; JP: 1998	Notes: Developed by Premier Systems.; Published by Toho.
Godzilla Online Original release date(s): NA: 1998; EU: 1998; JP: 1998	Release years by system: 1998—CD-ROM
Godzilla Online Original release date(s): NA: 1998; EU: 1998; JP: 1998	Notes: Developed by Mythic Entertainment.; Published by Kesmai Corporation.; Based upon the 1998 film Godzilla.
Godzilla - The Aftermath Original release date(s): NA: 1998; EU: 1998; JP: 1998	Release years by system: 1998—Online
Godzilla - The Aftermath Original release date(s): NA: 1998; EU: 1998; JP: 1998	Notes: Developed by TriStar Pictures.; Published by TriStar Pictures.; Based upon the 1998 film Godzilla.; Godzilla - The Aftermath on godzilla.com
G-Patrol VR Combat Simulator Original release date(s): NA: 1998; EU: 1998; JP: 1998	Release years by system: 1998—Online
G-Patrol VR Combat Simulator Original release date(s): NA: 1998; EU: 1998; JP: 1998	Notes: Developed by TriStar Pictures.; Published by TriStar Pictures.; Based upon the 1998 film Godzilla.
Godzilla Original release date(s): NA: 1998; EU: 1998; JP: 1998	Release years by system: 1998—LCD
Godzilla Original release date(s): NA: 1998; EU: 1998; JP: 1998	Notes: Developed by TriStar Pictures.; Published by TriStar Pictures.; Based upon the 1998 film Godzilla.
Godzilla: Virtual Shakin' Original release date(s): NA: 1998; EU: 1998; JP: 1998	Release years by system: 1998—LCD
Godzilla: Virtual Shakin' Original release date(s): NA: 1998; EU: 1998; JP: 1998	Notes: Developed by TriStar Pictures.; Published by TriStar Pictures.; Based upon the 1998 film Godzilla.
Godzilla Original release date(s): NA: 1998; EU: 1998; JP: 1998	Release years by system: 1998—Pinball
Godzilla Original release date(s): NA: 1998; EU: 1998; JP: 1998	Notes: Developed by Sega.; Published by Sega.; Based upon the 1998 film Godzilla.
Godzilla Trading Battle Original release date(s): JP: 1998	Release years by system: 1998—PlayStation
Godzilla Trading Battle Original release date(s): JP: 1998	Notes: Developed by Toho.; Published by Toho.; Based upon the 1998 film Godzilla and previous Godzilla films.
Godzilla Generations Original release date(s): JP: February 27, 1998	Release years by system: 1998—Dreamcast
Godzilla Generations Original release date(s): JP: February 27, 1998	Notes: Developed by General Entertainment.; Published by Sega.; Based upon the 1998 film Godzilla and previous Godzilla films.
Godzilla Generations: Maximum Impact Original release date(s): JP: December 23, 1999	Release years by system: 1999—Dreamcast
Godzilla Generations: Maximum Impact Original release date(s): JP: December 23, 1999	Notes: Developed by General Entertainment.; Published by Sega.
Godzilla: The Series Original release date(s): NA: 1999; EU: 1999; JP: 1999	Release years by system: 1999—Game Boy Color
Godzilla: The Series Original release date(s): NA: 1999; EU: 1999; JP: 1999	Notes: Developed by Crawfish Interactive.; Published by Crave.; Based upon the 1998-2000 TV series Godzilla: The Series.

=== Titles released in the 2000s ===
Game	Details
Godzilla: The Series - Monster Wars Original release date(s): NA: 2000; EU: 2000; JP: 2000	Release years by system: 2000—Game Boy Color
Godzilla: The Series - Monster Wars Original release date(s): NA: 2000; EU: 2000; JP: 2000	Notes: Developed by Crawfish Interactive.; Published by Crave.; Based upon the 1998-2000 TV series Godzilla: The Series.
Godzilla: Destroy All Monsters Melee Original release date(s): (GameCube): NA: October 8, 2002; EU: November 15, 2002; JP: December 12, 2002; (Xbox): NA: April 16, 2003; EU: Mid 2003	Release years by system: 2002—GameCube, Xbox
Godzilla: Destroy All Monsters Melee Original release date(s): (GameCube): NA: October 8, 2002; EU: November 15, 2002; JP: December 12, 2002; (Xbox): NA: April 16, 2003; EU: Mid 2003	Notes: Developed by Pipeworks Software.; Published by Infogrames.
Godzilla: Domination! Original release date(s): NA: November 11, 2002; EU: November 15, 2002; JP: December 11, 2002	Release years by system: 2002—Game Boy Advance
Godzilla: Domination! Original release date(s): NA: November 11, 2002; EU: November 15, 2002; JP: December 11, 2002	Notes: Developed by WayForward Technologies.; Published by Infogrames.
Godzilla: Save the Earth Original release date(s): (Playstation 2): NA: November 2, 2004; EU: December 9, 2004; JP: December 10, 2004; (Xbox): NA: November 16, 2004; EU: November 19, 2004	Release years by system: 2004—Xbox, PlayStation 2
Godzilla: Save the Earth Original release date(s): (Playstation 2): NA: November 2, 2004; EU: December 9, 2004; JP: December 10, 2004; (Xbox): NA: November 16, 2004; EU: November 19, 2004	Notes: Developed by Pipeworks Software.; Published by Atari
CR Godzilla 3S-T Battle Original release date(s): JP: 2006	Release years by system: 2006—Pachinko
CR Godzilla 3S-T Battle Original release date(s): JP: 2006	Notes: Developed by Newgin.; Published by Newgin.
Godzilla: Pachislot Wars Original release date(s): JP: 2007	Release years by system: 2007—Pachislot
Godzilla: Pachislot Wars Original release date(s): JP: 2007	Notes: Developed by Sammy.; Published by Sammy.
Godzilla: Unleashed Original release date(s): (Playstation 2): NA: November 20, 2007; EU: February 22, 2008; AU: February 29, 2008; (Wii): NA: December 5, 2007; EU: February 22, 2008; AU: February 29, 2008	Release years by system: 2007—Wii, PlayStation 2
Godzilla: Unleashed Original release date(s): (Playstation 2): NA: November 20, 2007; EU: February 22, 2008; AU: February 29, 2008; (Wii): NA: December 5, 2007; EU: February 22, 2008; AU: February 29, 2008	Notes: Developed by Pipeworks Software.; Published by Atari; Sold around 800,000 units.
Godzilla Unleashed: Double Smash Original release date(s): NA: November 20, 2007; EU: February 22, 2008; AU: December 5, 2007	Release years by system: 2007—Nintendo DS
Godzilla Unleashed: Double Smash Original release date(s): NA: November 20, 2007; EU: February 22, 2008; AU: December 5, 2007	Notes: Developed by Pipeworks Software.; Published by Atari
Godzilla: Monster Mayhem (fighting app) Original release date(s): NA: 2009; EU: 2009; JP: 2009	Release years by system: 2009—iOS
Godzilla: Monster Mayhem (fighting app) Original release date(s): NA: 2009; EU: 2009; JP: 2009	Notes: Developed by Indiagames Ltd.; Published by Indiagames Ltd.
Godzilla: Monster Mayhem (sidescroller app) Original release date(s): NA: 2009; EU: 2009; JP: 2009	Release years by system: 2009—iOS
Godzilla: Monster Mayhem (sidescroller app) Original release date(s): NA: 2009; EU: 2009; JP: 2009	Notes: Developed by Indiagames Ltd.; Published by Indiagames Ltd.

=== Titles released in the 2010s ===
Game	Details
CR Godzilla: Descent of the Destruction God Original release date(s): NA: 2010; EU: 2010; JP: 2010	Release years by system: 2010—Pachinko
CR Godzilla: Descent of the Destruction God Original release date(s): NA: 2010; EU: 2010; JP: 2010	Notes: Developed by Newgin.; Published by Newgin.
Godzilla on Monster Island Original release date(s): NA: 2011; EU: 2011; JP: 2011	Release years by system: 2011—AVP Slot
Godzilla on Monster Island Original release date(s): NA: 2011; EU: 2011; JP: 2011	Notes: Developed by IGT.; Published by IGT.
Monster Strike Original release date(s): NA: 2013; EU: 2013; JP: 2013	Release years by system: 2013—iOS, Android
Monster Strike Original release date(s): NA: 2013; EU: 2013; JP: 2013	Notes: Developed by Pixi, Ltd.; Published by Pixi, Ltd.
Godzilla Encounter Original release date(s): NA: 2014; EU: 2014; JP: 2014	Release years by system: 2014—iOS, Android
Godzilla Encounter Original release date(s): NA: 2014; EU: 2014; JP: 2014	Notes: Developed by Legendary Pictures.; Published by Legendary Pictures.
Godzilla: Crisis Defense Original release date(s): NA: 2014; EU: 2014; JP: 2014	Release years by system: 2014—Online
Godzilla: Crisis Defense Original release date(s): NA: 2014; EU: 2014; JP: 2014	Notes: Developed by Legendary Pictures.; Published by Legendary Pictures.; Official Site
Godzilla: Strike Zone Original release date(s): NA: 2014; EU: 2014; JP: 2014	Release years by system: 2014—iOS, Android, Online
Godzilla: Strike Zone Original release date(s): NA: 2014; EU: 2014; JP: 2014	Notes: Developed by Legendary Pictures.; Published by Legendary Pictures.; Official Site
Godzilla Smash3 Original release date(s): NA: 2014; EU: 2014; JP: 2014	Release years by system: 2014—iOS, Android
Godzilla Smash3 Original release date(s): NA: 2014; EU: 2014; JP: 2014	Notes: Developed by Pipeworks.; Published by RoguePlay.
Godzilla Original release date(s): NA: 2015; EU: 2015; JP: 2015	Release years by system: 2015—PlayStation 3, PlayStation 4
Godzilla Original release date(s): NA: 2015; EU: 2015; JP: 2015	Notes: Developed by Natsume Atari.; Published by Bandai Namco Entertainment.
Godzilla: Kaiju Collection Original release date(s): NA: 2015; EU: 2015; JP: 2015	Release years by system: 2015—iOS, Android
Godzilla: Kaiju Collection Original release date(s): NA: 2015; EU: 2015; JP: 2015	Notes: Developed by HEROZ, Inc.; Published by HEROZ, Inc.
Shin Godzilla Original release date(s): NA: 2016; EU: 2016; JP: 2016	Release years by system: 2016—PlayStation.VR demo for PlayStation 4
Shin Godzilla Original release date(s): NA: 2016; EU: 2016; JP: 2016	Notes: Developed by Toho.; Published by Toho.
City Shrouded in Shadow Original release date(s): JP: 2017	Release years by system: 2017—PlayStation 4
City Shrouded in Shadow Original release date(s): JP: 2017	Notes: Developed by Granzella.; Published by Bandai Namco.; Features Godzilla, King Ghidorah, Mothra, Battra, and Kiryu.
Godzilla Defense Force Original release date(s): NA: 2019; EU: 2019; JP: 2019	Release years by system: 2019—iOS, Android
Godzilla Defense Force Original release date(s): NA: 2019; EU: 2019; JP: 2019	Notes: Developed by Neople and Studio 42.; Published by Nexon.

=== Titles released in the 2020s ===
Game	Details
Fall Guys Original release date(s): NA: 2020; EU: 2020; JP: 2020	Release years by system: 2020—Microsoft Windows, PlayStation 4, Android, iOS
Fall Guys Original release date(s): NA: 2020; EU: 2020; JP: 2020	Notes: Developed by Mediatonic; Published by Devolver Digital.; Godzilla appears as an official downloadable skin.
Godzilla Battle Line Original release date(s): NA: 2021; EU: 2021; JP: 2021	Release years by system: 2021—iOS, Android
Godzilla Battle Line Original release date(s): NA: 2021; EU: 2021; JP: 2021	Notes: Developed by Now Productions.; Published by Toho Games.
Godzilla Destruction Original release date(s): NA: 2021; EU: 2021; JP: 2021	Release years by system: 2021—iOS, Android
Godzilla Destruction Original release date(s): NA: 2021; EU: 2021; JP: 2021	Notes: Developed by Nobollel.; Published by Toho Games.; Servers were shut down as of January 1st, 2022
Run Godzilla Original release date(s): NA: 2021; EU: 2021; JP: 2021	Release years by system: 2021—iOS, Android
Run Godzilla Original release date(s): NA: 2021; EU: 2021; JP: 2021	Notes: Developed by KingMo.; Published by Toho Games.
GigaBash Original release date(s): 2022	Release years by system: 2022—Microsoft Windows, PlayStation 4, PlayStation 5, 2023—Nintendo Switch, Xbox One, Xbox Series X
GigaBash Original release date(s): 2022	Notes: Developed and published by Passion Republic Games.; Godzilla (Heisei), Gigan (Showa), Mechagodzilla (Kiryu), and Destoroyah were released as part of a DLC set on December 6, 2022.; A second batch of DLC, titled Godzilla: Nemesis, was released on May 16, 2024, featuring King Ghidorah (Heisei) and Hedorah (Showa).
Godzilla: Voxel Wars Original release date(s): 2023	Release years by system: 2022—Microsoft Windows
Godzilla: Voxel Wars Original release date(s): 2023	Notes: Developed by Nukenin LLC.; Published by Toho Games.; Resembles the 2018 turn based strategy game Into the Breach.
Dave the Diver Original release date(s): 2024	Release years by system: 2024 — Microsoft Windows, Nintendo Switch, PlayStation 4, PlayStation 5
Dave the Diver Original release date(s): 2024	Notes: Developed and published by Mintrocket.; Released for free on May 23, 2024, only available until November 23, 2024.; Features Burning Godzilla, Ebirah, and Miki Saegusa.
Sonic Rumble Original release date(s): 2025	Release years by system: 2025 — Microsoft Windows, Android, iOS
Sonic Rumble Original release date(s): 2025	Notes: Developed and published by Sega.; Collaboration lasts from December 22, 2025 to January 21, 2026.; Godzilla (Heisei), King Ghidorah (Heisei), Mechagodzilla (Kiryu), and Destoroyah are featured as playable characters.; The crossover also features a stage where players must survive Godzilla and mechanical versions of Shockirus sea lice.
Sonic Racing: CrossWorlds Original release date(s): 2025	Release years by system: 2025 — Microsoft Windows, Nintendo Switch, Nintendo Switch 2, PlayStation 4, PlayStation 5, Xbox One, Xbox Series X and Series S
Sonic Racing: CrossWorlds Original release date(s): 2025	Notes: Developed and published by Sega.; Downloadable content featuring a Godzilla themed race track and vehicles based on Godzilla, King Ghidorah, and Mothra was released on November 3, 2026.
Godzilla: Destroy All Monsters Melee Remastered Original release date(s): 2026	Release years by system: 2026—Microsoft Windows, Nintendo Switch, Nintendo Switch 2, PlayStation 5, Xbox Series X and Series S
Godzilla: Destroy All Monsters Melee Remastered Original release date(s): 2026	Notes: Developed by Pipeworks Software.; Published by Atari.; Remaster of Godzilla: Destroy All Monsters Melee

=== Cancelled titles ===
Game	Details
Rodan Original release date(s): NA: 1991; EU: 1991; JP: 1991	Release years by system: 1991—NES
Rodan Original release date(s): NA: 1991; EU: 1991; JP: 1991	Notes: Developed by Toho.; Eventually changed into the 1992 title Godzilla 2: War of the Monsters.
Godzilla: Destroy All Monsters Original release date(s): NA: 1994	Release years by system: 1994—SNES
Godzilla: Destroy All Monsters Original release date(s): NA: 1994	Notes: Developed by Toho.; Planned American release of the 1994 Super Famicom title Godzilla: Kaijuu Daikessen.
Godzilla Original release date(s): NA: 1998	Release years by system: 1998—Game.Com
Godzilla Original release date(s): NA: 1998	Notes: Developed by Tiger Electronics; Planned for release, but cancelled after a dispute led to Tiger losing the license.

== Board games ==
Game	Details
Godzilla Game Original release date(s): (Note: Box and board art painted by Ralph Pereida): NA: 1963	Release years by system: 1963
Godzilla Game Original release date(s): NA: 1963	Notes: Developed by Ideal.; Published by Ideal.
Godzilla Game Original release date(s): NA: 1978	Release years by system: 1978
Godzilla Game Original release date(s): NA: 1978	Notes: Developed by Mattel.; Published by Mattel.
Godzilla Original release date(s): NA: 1998; EU: 1998; JP: 1998	Release years by system: 1998
Godzilla Original release date(s): NA: 1998; EU: 1998; JP: 1998	Notes: Developed by Milton Bradley.; Published by Milton Bradley.
Kong: Skull Island Game Original release date(s): NA: 2005; EU: 2005; JP: 2005	Release years by system: 2005
Kong: Skull Island Game Original release date(s): NA: 2005; EU: 2005; JP: 2005	Notes: Developed by Pressman Toy Corp.; Published by Pressman Toy Corp.
Godzilla: Kaiju World Wars Original release date(s): NA: 2010	Release years by system: 2010
Godzilla: Kaiju World Wars Original release date(s): NA: 2010	Notes: Developed by ToyVault.; Published by ToyVault.
JENGA: Godzilla Extreme Edition Original release date(s): NA: 2020; EU: 2020	Release years by system: 2020
JENGA: Godzilla Extreme Edition Original release date(s): NA: 2020; EU: 2020	Notes: Developed by Hasbro.; Published by The OP.
MONOPOLY: Godzilla Monster Edition Original release date(s): NA: 2020; EU: 2020	Release years by system: 2020
MONOPOLY: Godzilla Monster Edition Original release date(s): NA: 2020; EU: 2020	Notes: Developed by Hasbro.; Published by The OP.
Godzilla: Tokyo Clash Original release date(s): NA: 2020; EU: 2020	Release years by system: 2020
Godzilla: Tokyo Clash Original release date(s): NA: 2020; EU: 2020	Notes: Developed by Prospero Hall.; Published by Funko Games.
Clue: Godzilla Original release date(s): NA: 2025	Release years by system: 2025
Clue: Godzilla Original release date(s): NA: 2025	Notes: Licensed by Hasbro Games

== Card games ==
Game	Details
Godzilla Stomp! Original release date(s): NA: 2011	Release years by system: 2011
Godzilla Stomp! Original release date(s): NA: 2011	Notes: Developed by ToyVault; Published by ToyVault.
Battle Spirits Original release date(s):	Release years by system: 2015
Battle Spirits Original release date(s):	Notes: Developed by Bandai.; Published by Bandai.
Godzilla Card Game Original release date(s): NA: 2019	Release years by system: 2019
Godzilla Card Game Original release date(s): NA: 2019	Notes: Developed by Bandai.; Published by Bandai.

== See also ==
- Gamera 2000
