= Godzilla: Save the Earth =

2004 video game

- Developer: Pipeworks Software
- Publisher: Atari
- Series: Godzilla
- Platforms: PlayStation 2 Xbox
- Release: PlayStation 2: NA: November 2, 2004; EU: December 9, 2004; JP: December 9, 2004; AU: December 17, 2004; Xbox: NA: November 16, 2004; EU: November 19, 2004; AU: December 10, 2004
- Genre: Fighting
- Modes: Single player, Multiplayer

Godzilla: Save the Earth is a fighting video game based on Toho's Godzilla franchise. It is developed by Pipeworks Software, published by Atari, and released in 2004 for PlayStation 2 and Xbox.

The game is a sequel to 2002's Godzilla: Destroy All Monsters Melee, and was followed by Godzilla: Unleashed in 2007.

== Gameplay ==
A fight between Destoroyah and King Ghidorah

The gameplay is very similar to the previous game, with the main differences being that it plays at a slower pace and allows monsters to use their beam attacks more frequently. New additions included elevated terrains, a challenge mode, online play, and a more cohesive story mode that includes limited traveling sections and underwater levels. In addition to all twelve playable monsters from the previous game, Save the Earth introduces six new playable monsters: Baragon, Jet Jaguar, Megaguirus, Moguera, Mothra, and SpaceGodzilla.

The original servers for both versions of Save the Earth are no longer in operation, but the Xbox version is playable online using unofficial Xbox Live revival servers called Insignia.

== Plot ==
Save the Earth takes place two years after Godzilla: Destroy All Monsters Melee. The story involves mankind getting hold of Godzilla's DNA, known in the game as "G-Cells." The Vortaak learn of this, once again returning to Earth, controlling a vast army of monsters, including their ultimate weapon: SpaceGodzilla. The player faces down many controlled monsters in different locations. In the climax cut-scene, Godzilla confronts SpaceGodzilla in a final duel. Godzilla blasts off SpaceGodzilla's shoulder crystals causing a black hole to form. SpaceGodzilla is sucked in and apparently killed, forcing the Vortaak to retreat while Godzilla lets out a victorious roar, having saved the Earth yet again.

== Reception ==
Reception

Aggregate score
Aggregator	Score	
Aggregator	PS2	Xbox
Metacritic	62/100	63/100

Review scores
Publication	Score	
Publication	PS2	Xbox
1Up.com	B−	B−
Electronic Gaming Monthly	5.33/10	5.33/10
Game Informer	6/10	6/10
GameSpot	6/10	6/10
GameSpy	3/5	3/5
IGN	6.5/10	6.5/10
Official U.S. PlayStation Magazine	2.5/5	N/A
Official Xbox Magazine (US)	N/A	7.1/10
TeamXbox	N/A	6.1/10
X-Play	2/5	2/5
Detroit Free Press	N/A	2/4

Godzilla: Save the Earth received mixed reviews on both platforms according to video game review aggregator Metacritic.

1UP gave the game a "B−" score, saying: "Godzilla: Save the Earth is a fun game and a worthy sequel to Godzilla: Destroy All Monsters Melee. If it had been afforded a little more finesse (especially regarding the Challenges) and a little more authentic Godzilla flavor, it'd be even sweeter. The fact is, though, that unless you're a Godzilla fan, there are better games of this general type out there (War of the Monsters and Def Jam: Fight for New York come to mind). Still, the kaiju in Godzilla's universe are way cooler than grown, sweaty men in tights."
