= Godzilla (1990 video game) =

1990 Game Boy video game

- North American cover art
- Developer: Compile
- Publishers: WW: Toho; EU: Infogrames
- Composers: Akira Ifukube (Theme song); Tsukamoto Masanobu
- Series: Godzilla
- Platform: Game Boy
- Release: NA: October 1990; JP: December 18, 1990; EU: 1991
- Genre: Action
- Mode: Single-player

Godzilla (ゴジラくん 怪獣大行進, Gojira-kun: Kaijū Daikōshin) is a video game developed by Compile based on the Godzilla franchise, and was first released for Game Boy in 1990. It is a port of the 1985 MSX game, Gojira-Kun. The game features character designs from the franchise's Showa era films.

== Plot ==
Various monsters that Godzilla had previously defeated, have kidnapped his son, Minilla, and hidden him somewhere inside the Labyrinth of Matrix. It is up to Godzilla to fight the monsters' attacks and solve their many puzzles, all while navigating a much larger maze.

== Gameplay ==
The game is a 2D side-scrolling video game where Godzilla can only walk around or climb ladders, vines or crystals. A prominent part of the game is his punch, the only attack he has, which is used to destroy boulders, and to kill or push enemies. The main point of each room is to destroy all of the boulders, by pushing them against a wall and hitting it again. Once all of the boulders are gone, one or two arrow panels will appear somewhere in the room. Touching one will take Godzilla to the room in a large map corresponding to its direction. As levels are completed, the direction is revealed on the map for further use.

There are three items in the game: the hourglass (or "sandglass"), the heart, and the lightning bolt (or "thunder"). The hourglass stops all enemy movement for a short period of time. The heart increases Godzilla's health. The lightning bolt kills all enemies on-screen, except for Ghidorah.

=== Saving ===
The game uses a password system to save. There are two variations: a four-character password and an eighteen-character password. Four-character passwords only save the player's position on the map, while eighteen-character passwords save the revealed map points. Neither of them save extra lives or the player's score.

=== Monsters ===
Each character is briefly outlined in the game's manual:

- Godzilla: The first playable character. He must punch boulders through 64 levels, in order to find his son.
- Minilla: Godzilla's son, who was captured and placed in the heart of the Labyrinth of Matrix. He is only seen in the end, and does not appear in any of the levels.
- Baragon: A slow moving enemy.
- Mechagodzilla: The robotic double of Godzilla, one of Godzilla's main rivals, with a speed that is slightly slower than Godzilla's.
- Hedorah (or "Hedrah"): A normally invincible monster, that can only be defeated by a boulder, a spike pit, or a lightning bolt. He is also the slowest in movement.
- Anguirus (or "Anguillas"): A mutant Ankylosaurus that is usually an ally of Godzilla. Normally is a regular paced enemy, but once he is leveled with Godzilla, he will charge at a high speed, making him the fastest in the game.
- Rodan: A mutant Pteranodon that, just like Anguirus, is usually Godzilla's ally, but now an enemy who flies after him, making it harder to avoid damage.
- King Ghidorah (or "Ghidrah"): A mutant extraterrestrial dragon. After about two minutes, Ghidorah will appear. Having both invincibility and flight, it is very hard to make it past him. He can't be killed by anything. Ghidorah also flies in short bursts.

== Japanese version ==
There are a few differences in the Japanese version when compared to the international versions:

- Godzilla moves faster in the Japanese version, with his speed having been decreased in the international versions.
- When fighting Hedorah, the player can punch him, instead of pushing him back and stunning him.
- Ghidorah can actually be taken out in the Japanese version, not in the international versions, where he is invincible.
- The monsters' graphics are different from the international versions.
- There is a two-player mode that does not appear in the international versions.

== Release and reception ==
Reception

Review score
Publication	Score
Electronic Gaming Monthly	6/10, 7/10, 5/10, 8/10

Godzilla was released for the Game Boy in the United States on October 1990.
