= Gamera 2000 =

1997 video game

- Developer: Surveyor Corp.
- Publisher: Daiei Digital Entertainment
- Platform: PlayStation
- Release: JP: April 25, 1997
- Genre: Action
- Modes: Single-player, multiplayer

Gamera 2000 is a video game developed by Surveyor Corp. and released by Daiei Digital Entertainment for the PlayStation. The game features the giant monster character Gamera, and was released in Japan on April 25, 1997.

== Gameplay ==
The gameplay of Gamera 2000 is very similar to Panzer Dragoon. The game features eight levels in total.

== Development ==
The game was released in Japan on April 25, 1997, in Japan for the Sony PlayStation and published by Datai Digital Entertainment. Publisher THQ had expressed some interest in releasing it in North America; however, the game was never published outside of Japan.

== Reception ==
Reception

Review scores
Publication	Score
Famitsu	27/40
GameFan	86.33
GameSpot	7.5
Super Game Power	4/5
Dengeki PlayStation	85/100, 80/100, 75/100, 80/100
Gamers	85/100

Famitsu gave the game a 27 out of 40 score.

Gamespot gave the game 7.5 out of 10.

GameFan gave it scores of 89, 90, and 80.

Super GamePower gave it a 4 out of 5.
