= Godzilla: Monster of Monsters! =

1988 video game

- North American cover art
- Developer: Compile
- Publisher: Toho
- Series: Godzilla
- Platform: NES
- Release: JP: December 9, 1988; NA: October 1989; EU: 1991
- Genre: Action
- Mode: Single-player

Godzilla: Monster of Monsters! (ゴジラ) is a Nintendo Entertainment System video game released in Japan in 1988 and in 1989 in the US by Toho Co., Ltd. The North American version removes all references to Toho Cenfile-Soft Library and Compile, crediting the game to Toho Eizo on the title screen instead.

== Storyline ==
In the year 2XXX, the mysterious Planet X appears when Pluto and Neptune switch positions in the Solar System, and its inhabitants begin an attempt to conquer the Earth, using a legion of space monsters (though some of these creatures were in fact from Earth) as their primary attack force. The King of Monsters, Godzilla, joins forces with the guardian monster Mothra and the forces of Earth to repel the invasion forces.

== Gameplay ==
Mothra trying to defeat Manda, a monster that emerges from the Martian volcanoes.

The game features two playable monsters, Godzilla and Mothra. The player uses both monsters in turn by selecting the desired character on a virtual gameboard, representative of the planet it is on, and moving it like a chess piece. Each space is a hexagon that represents playable, side-scrolling levels. There are rocky zones, jungle zones, city zones, and hyperspace zones. The hyperspace zones feature fights with the Matango, Dogora, and the Goten. The alien space ships resemble the design of Atragon and The War in Space.

Each board contains several monsters from the Godzilla series and some from other Toho movies and the objective is to clear each board of enemy monsters before advancing to the next board. Battles are fought when the player moves Godzilla or Mothra adjacent to an enemy monster, and are reminiscent of a match from a fighting game. The player plays a small side-scrolling level for each space advanced, and if one has moved adjacent to the monster, a battle follows the side-scrolling stages. More monsters appear on each stage until nearly every monster in the game is featured. When the player reaches Planet X, every previous monster is present along with King Ghidorah himself. The monster battles have a time limit of forty seconds but lack a countdown timer.

The monsters from the game (in order of confrontation and with their corresponding planets):

- Earth: Gezora - A giant squid or cuttlefish-like creature (originally from the 1970 movie Space Amoeba)
- Earth: Moguera - A giant robot (originally from the 1957 movie The Mysterians)
- Mars: Varan - A water lizard (originally from the 1958 movie (Varan The Unbelievable)
- Jupiter: Hedorah - A giant alien creature that feeds off of pollution (from the 1971 Godzilla movie Godzilla vs. Hedorah)
- Saturn: Baragon - A fire-breathing dinosaur (originally from the 1965 movie Frankenstein Conquers the World)
- Uranus: Gigan - A cyborg monster with blade arms (from the 1972 Godzilla movie Godzilla vs. Gigan)
- Pluto: Mechagodzilla - A robotic replica of Godzilla (from the 1974 Godzilla movie Godzilla vs. Mechagodzilla)
- Planet X: King Ghidorah - A giant three-headed dragon (from the 1964 Godzilla movie Ghidorah, the Three-Headed Monster)

The titular mushroom kaiju from the 1963 film Matango appear as mid-bosses throughout the early stages of the game. In later stages, that role goes to Gohten, the space battleship from the 1977 sci-fi film The War in Space.

In addition, Dogora from the 1964 film of the same name and the creature Manda from the 1963 film Atragon appear as common enemies throughout the game.

== Reception ==
Reception

Review scores
Publication	Score
Consoles +	61%
Electronic Gaming Monthly	5/10, 5/10, 6/10, 4/10
Joypad	58%
Joystick	63%
Official Nintendo Magazine	41%
Player One	25%
Total!	10%
Famicom Hisshōbon	2/5
Mean Machines	45%
Super Gamer	19%

Godzilla: Monster of Monsters received generally unfavorable reception from critics.

== Legacy ==
In 1992, Toho released a sequel called Godzilla 2: War of the Monsters for the NES. The player controls the Army, trying to protect Japan from the Godzilla monsters. Syracuse Herald-Journal commented that while the game is "OK" as a strategy title, a more action-oriented approach would have been preferable.

This game was the focus on a popular creepypasta titled "NES Godzilla Creepypasta", where a fan of the game ends up playing a twisted version of the game possessed by a vicious demonic entity called Red, a skeletal red monster who heavily distorts the game to hellish and unrealistic depths and has a history with the narrator's late girlfriend. The story is notable for also featuring a heavy amount of "screencaps" from the fictional version of the game. A sequel of the creepypasta was made involving a person buying the game in order to see if it's actually possessed, and ends up encountering a grey ape-like creature similar to Red named "Warlock" who demands the person stops playing the possessed game. A fangame had been in development with a demo being released in 2017, however it ceased production in 2023.
