= María Teresa Aguado =

Spanish evolutionary biologist (1976– )

Maria Teresa Aguado
- Born: Madrid, Spain
- Education: Autonomous University of Madrid
- Known for: Research on invertebrates, especially worms
- Scientific career
- Fields: Biology, Zoology, Evolutionary biology, Biodiversity
- Workplaces: Autonomous University of Madrid; University of Göttingen

Maria Teresa Aguado Molina, also known as Maite Aguado; is a Spanish-German biologist, curator, adjunct professor, and since 2022 she coordinates a new exhibition of the Biodiversity Museum Göttingen.

== Career ==
Maria Teresa "Maite" Aguado Molina was born in Madrid. After studying biology at the Autonomous University of Madrid, she worked for five years as a biology teacher while earning additional university degrees in educational sciences, evolutionary biology, and biodiversity. She then completed her doctoral dissertation on a topic that continues to define her scientific career: invertebrate marine animals, particularly worms.

After holding a position as assistant professor and spending research stays in the USA, she was appointed associate professor of biology and zoology at the Autonomous University of Madrid in 2014.

In 2019, she became a curator, and in 2021 an apl. professor, and since 2022 she coordinates a new exhibition of the Biodiversity Museum Göttingen at the Georgia Augusta. She also teaches evolution and biodiversity at the Johann Friedrich Blumenbach Institute of Zoology and Anthropology.

== Publications ==
- Biodiversitätsmuseum Göttingen. Maria Teresa Aguado Molina, Christoph Bleidorn, Sonja Vogt (eds.), Universitätsverlag Göttingen, 2021, ISBN 978-3-8639-5487-1.
