= Godzilla vs. Gigan =

1972 film by Jun Fukuda

- Theatrical release poster

Japanese name
- Kanji: 地球攻撃命令 ゴジラ対ガイガン
Transcriptions
- Revised Hepburn: Chikyū Kōgeki Meirei: Gojira tai Gaigan
- Directed by: Jun Fukuda
- Written by: Shinichi Sekizawa
- Produced by: Tomoyuki Tanaka
- Starring: Hiroshi Ishikawa; Tomoko Umeda; Yuriko Hishimi; Minoru Takashima; Zan Fujita; Toshiaki Nishizawa; Kunio Murai
- Cinematography: Kiyoshi Hasegawa
- Music by: Akira Ifukube
- Production company: Toho-Eizo
- Distributed by: Toho
- Release date: March 12, 1972
- Running time: 89 minutes
- Country: Japan
- Language: Japanese
- Budget: ¥30 million (est.; $100,000)
- Box office: ¥320 million

Godzilla vs. Gigan (Japanese: 地球攻撃命令 ゴジラ対ガイガン, Hepburn: Chikyū Kōgeki Meirei Gojira Tai Gaigan; lit. Earth Destruction Directive: Godzilla vs. Gigan) is a 1972 Japanese kaiju film directed by Jun Fukuda, with special effects by Teruyoshi Nakano. Distributed by Toho and produced under its special effects-based subsidiary Toho-Eizo, it is the 12th film in the Godzilla franchise. The film stars Hiroshi Ishikawa, Yuriko Hishimi, Tomoko Umeda, and Minoru Takashima, alongside Haruo Nakajima as Godzilla, Kenpachiro Satsuma as Gigan, Koetsu Omiya as Anguirus and Kanta Ina as Ghidorah. It is the last film in which Godzilla was portrayed by Nakajima after playing the character since the original 1954 film; he subsequently retired from suit acting.

Godzilla vs. Gigan was released theatrically in Japan on March 12, 1972. It received a wide theatrical release in the United States in 1977 by Cinema Shares under the title Godzilla on Monster Island and was released in the UK by Miracle Films the same year under the title War of the Monsters.

The film was followed by Godzilla vs. Megalon, released on March 17, 1973.

== Plot ==
The Nebulans, a race of cockroach-like aliens from a planet in M Space Hunter Nebula, plot to take over the Earth, as their home planet has been destroyed by pollution from another race native to the planet, which destroyed itself in the process. To carry out their plans in secret, they disguise themselves using skin suits based on deceased humans, and build World Children's Land, a theme park which serves as a disguise for their base of operations, centered inside a statue of Godzilla called the Godzilla Tower. They also have King Ghidorah and Gigan at their disposal, guiding the monsters using Action Signal Tapes, which broadcast a frequency that instructs them on what to do. The aliens plan to use their monsters to wipe out human civilisation.

Gengo Odaka, a freelance manga artist, inadvertently discovers one of the tapes after being hired by the Nebulans to produce concept art for the park. When the tape is played, the signal is heard by Godzilla and Anguirus on Monster Island, who realize something is amiss. Anguirus is sent to Tokyo to investigate but is driven back by the JSDF. After reporting back to Godzilla, the two monsters set off for Tokyo again to confront the Nebulans at World Children's Land.

As they arrive, the Nebulans send Gigan and Ghidorah into battle, who prove to be more than a match for Godzilla and Anguirus; to make matters worse, Godzilla is badly injured by the Nebulans when the Godzilla Tower fires an extremely powerful laser weapon at Godzilla, and is rapidly overpowered by Gigan's assortment of bladed weapons. However, Gengo and his friends come to the aid of Godzilla and Anguirus when they destroy Godzilla Tower with TNT supplied by the JSDF, killing the Nebulans and leaving Ghidorah and Gigan without instruction.

Though the extraterrestrial monsters manage to regain their composure and briefly resume the fight, Godzilla and Anguirus now have the upper hand, and manage to drive both Ghidorah and Gigan into a full retreat. With the invasion defeated, Godzilla and Anguirus begin the return trip to Monster Island, much to the cheers of the humans who helped them fend off their opponents.

== Cast ==
- Hiroshi Ishikawa as Gengo Odaka
- Tomoko Umeda as Machiko Shima
- Yuriko Hishimi as Tomoko Tomoe
- Minoru Takashima as Shosaku Takasugi
- Zan Fujita as Fumio Sudo, the Chairman of World Children's Land
- Toshiaki Nishizawa as Kubota, Secretary of World Children's Land
- Kunio Murai as Takashi Shima
- Gen Shimizu as the Commander of Defense Forces
- Kuniko Ashihara as Mrs. Fudo
- Zeko Nakamura as Priest
- Akio Muto as Kadohisa
- Haruo Nakajima as Godzilla
- Kenpachiro Satsuma as Gigan. Satsuma previously portrayed Hedorah in the previous film and later portrays Godzilla in Heisei-era film series.
- Koetsu Omiya as Anguirus
- Kanta Ina as King Ghidorah

=== English dub ===
- Frank Mullen as Gengo Odaka
- Linda Masson as Machiko Shima
- Barbara Laney as Tomoko Tomoe
- Michael Kaye as Shosaku Takasugi, Anguirus
- Chris Hilton as Fumio Sudo
- Ted Thomas as Kubota, Godzilla
- Hal Archer as Takashi Shima
- Saul Lockhart as Commander of Defense Forces
- Jack Moore as Commander of Defense Forces
- Ron Oliphant

== Production ==
=== Writing ===
Disappointed with the critical and commercial reception of Godzilla vs. Hedorah (1971), Tomoyuki Tanaka immediately began thinking about how to take Godzilla back to the golden era of the 1960’s. Taking note of the Champion Matsuri Festival Reissue of Ghidorah, the Three-Headed Monster in 1971 and Invasion of Astro-Monster in 1972, which drew in strong attendance of 1,350,000 people, in contrast to Godzilla vs. Hedorah's 400,000, Tanaka felt the best way to reinvigorate Godzilla was not to try new things, but bring back fan-favorite villain King Ghidorah.

Tanaka commissioned both Shinichi Sekizawa and Takeshi Kimura, to write different drafts for the next Godzilla film, each of them coming up with their own separate concepts. Both writers were given stipulations from Tanaka though to include King Ghidorah and a new monster, Gigan. Presumably, someone at the studio also insisted upon the Godzilla Tower, as it appears in both writers’ drafts as well. The two drafts were submitted in July 1971.

Kimura's draft, titled Godzilla vs. The Space Monsters: Earth Destruction Directive (ゴジラ対宇宙怪獣 地球防衛命令, Gojira tai Uchū Kaijū: Chikyū Bōei Meirei) involved Miko, an alien being resembling a large brain, intends to conquer the Earth using King Ghidorah, Gigan and Megalon (later to be reworked into the main villain in 1973's Godzilla vs. Megalon). However Godzilla and Anguirus appear in Tokyo in defense of Earth. Miko uses the three space monsters to install his being into a giant statue of Majin Tuol, a fictional Inca god, which has been erected at Tokyo's Science Land. Gigan uses the buzzsaw in his chest to cut the statue, causing it to bleed. Majin Tuol, now having come to life and inhabiting the statue, allies itself with Godzilla and Anguirus. The three Earth monsters defeat the space creatures and Godzilla destroys Miko. After the decisive battle, Majin Tuol again turns to stone.

Sekizawa's pitch, titled King Ghidorah's Great Counterattack! (キングギドラの大逆襲!, Kingu Gidora no Daigyakushū!) or The Return of King Ghidorah, featured Godzilla, Rodan and Varan in combat with King Ghidorah, Gigan and a new monster called Mogu. Except for its monster cast, this draft was reportedly much closer to the final filmed version of Godzilla vs. Gigan.

=== Music ===
The majority of the film's soundtrack consists of recycled cues from previous Toho films such as Frankenstein vs. Baragon, Atragon, King Kong Escapes, Battle in Outer Space and several other Godzilla films. Akira Ifukube, who composed the music for those films, receives credit in the film. In addition to those stock tracks, several themes composed by Ifukube for the Mitsubishi Pavilion at Expo '70 are used throughout the movie. A new song called "Godzilla March", sung by Susumu Ishikawa and composed by Kunio Miyauchi, plays at the end of the film. Ishikawa also performed two more new songs ("Go! Go! Godzilla" and "Defeat Gigan") that were released on the soundtrack album.

=== Filming ===
This was Haruo Nakajima's final time playing Godzilla, a role he had played since 1954's Godzilla. Presumably in order to cut costs, the film relies heavily on stock footage from previous films, such as Ghidorah, the Three-Headed Monster, Invasion of Astro-Monster, The War of the Gargantuas and Destroy All Monsters for Godzilla and King Ghidorah's fighting screentime.

This was the first film in which Godzilla actually shed blood. It first happens during the big battle later in the film when Gigan flies over past Godzilla and swipes his shoulder, and later, when Gigan repeatedly strikes a severely weakened Godzilla in his forehead. Also, Anguirus is cut in the snout by Gigan at one point, consequently bleeding towards the camera.

=== Creature design ===
Gigan was designed by Shōnen Magazine illustrator Takayoshi Mizuki, based on ideas by Teruyoshi Nakano. Mizuki was contacted in early 1971 by Toho production manager Masao Suzuki to design a space monster for a new Godzilla film.

According to Nakano, "the idea for Gigan was to create a monster with quite a different shape," wanting for the monster to be akin to a "richly colored dinosaur" and also being inspired by the designs of the multilayered jūnihitoe kimonos worn by Japanese court ladies. Mizuki created two potential looks for Gigan, a "triangular" design reminiscent of his final appearance, and a "circular" design sporting a number of hemispheres across its body. Mizuki aimed for a "sharp, florid" look when creating Gigan's design, and took inspiration after birds; he based Gigan's form on migratory birds such as geese, and adopted the sharpness of an eagle from his neck up.

In this film, Ghidorah's three heads required completely new sculpts to be made, which were created by Nobuyuki Yasumaru. A year later, the suit would be used one final time for the television series Zone Fighter, before being formally retired.

== Release ==
=== Box office ===
In Japan, the film sold approximately 1,780,000 tickets. The film earned ¥320 million in Japan distribution income (rentals).

=== Critical response ===
On review aggregator Rotten Tomatoes, approval rating of 67% based on 6 reviews, with an average rating of 6/10.

=== English version ===
Following the film's release in Japan in March, 1972, Toho commissioned Hong Kong broadcaster and voice actor Ted Thomas to produce an English language dub. As was usual with Toho's international export versions of its films, Godzilla vs. Gigan was left uncut, although the credits were changed to English. One significant change was made for this international version. In the Japanese release, speech bubbles, as seen in comic books, are used to depict a conversation between Godzilla and Anguirus. The speech bubbles were removed in original prints of the English version and the conversation was dubbed into English with Thomas as the voice of Godzilla and Michael Kaye as the voice of Anguirus.

In 1977, Mel Maron's Cinema Shares International Distribution purchased the North American rights to Godzilla vs. Gigan and released the film as Godzilla on Monster Island in the U.S. Rather than going to the expense of dubbing the film again, Cinema Shares utilized Toho's English dub. Aiming for a "G" rating from the MPAA, the company's editors removed three instances of blood from the monster scenes and muted the phrase "You're a hard bitch" on the soundtrack. Following the theatrical release, Godzilla on Monster Island entered television syndication.

In the 1980s, Toho had regained control of the film's American distribution rights and licensed the film to New World Pictures. New World's home video division released the international version of Godzilla vs. Gigan on video in 1988, fully uncut. Several budget re-releases of the film continued from New World's successors over the next decade. Shortly thereafter, the Sci-Fi Channel began broadcasting Cinema Shares' version, Godzilla on Monster Island, in the early 1990s. A letterboxed transfer of Toho's international version replaced Godzilla on Monster Island on the channel in 2002.

=== Home media ===
The film received several VHS releases during the 1990s by distributors such as Anchor Bay Entertainment and PolyGram Video. The film was released on DVD by Sony Pictures Home Entertainment on October 19, 2004 and on Blu-ray by Kraken Releasing on May 6, 2014. In 2019, the Japanese version was included in a Blu-ray box set released by the Criterion Collection, which included all 15 films from the franchise's Shōwa era.
