= Godzilla vs. Megalon =

- Theatrical release poster

Japanese name
- Kanji: ゴジラ対メガロ
Transcriptions
- Revised Hepburn: gojira tai megalo
- Directed by: Jun Fukuda
- Screenplay by: Jun Fukuda
- Story by: Shinichi Sekizawa
- Produced by: Tomoyuki Tanaka
- Starring: Katsuhiko Sasaki; Hiroyuki Kawase; Yutaka Hayashi; Robert Dunham; Kotaro Tomita; Wolf Ohtsuki; Gentaro Nakajima
- Cinematography: Yuzuru Aizawa
- Music by: Riichiro Manabe
- Production company: Toho–Eizo
- Distributed by: Toho
- Release date: March 17, 1973
- Running time: 81 minutes
- Language: Japanese
- Budget: ¥30 million (est.; $100,000)
- Box office: $5 million (U.S.)

Godzilla vs. Megalon (ゴジラ対メガロ, Gojira tai Megaro) is a 1973 Japanese kaiju film directed by Jun Fukuda, written by Fukuda and Shinichi Sekizawa, and produced by Tomoyuki Tanaka, with special effects by Teruyoshi Nakano. Distributed by Toho and produced under their effects subsidiary Toho–Eizo, it is the 13th film in the Godzilla franchise. The film stars Katsuhiko Sasaki, Hiroyuki Kawase, Yutaka Hayashi, and Robert Dunham, alongside Shinji Takagi as Godzilla, Hideto Date as Megalon, Kenpachiro Satsuma as Gigan, and Tsugutoshi Komada as Jet Jaguar.

Godzilla vs. Megalon was released theatrically in Japan on March 17, 1973, it received generally mixed reviews from critics and audiences with criticism of its special effects and use of stock footage from previous Godzilla films. The film was given a theatrical release in the United States during the summer of 1976 by Cinema Shares, where it went on to gross $5 million. Given this release and subsequent home media, the film has become one of the most well-known kaiju films in the United States. The film's popularity might also be a major contributor to Western perceptions of kaiju films as comedic or campy. The film received revived recognition after an appearance on Mystery Science Theater 3000 in 1991.

The film was followed by Godzilla vs. Mechagodzilla, released on March 21, 1974.

== Plot ==
In the first part of 1971, (Note: 197X in Japanese version) the second of a series of underground nuclear tests is conducted, near the Aleutians, sending shockwaves as far as Monster Island in the South Pacific, severely damaging the island paradise and sending Anguirus plummeting into the depths of the Earth, with Godzilla narrowly escaping the fissure into which its friends tumble.

For millions of years, Seatopia, an opulent undersea civilization that resides in vast cities reminiscent of those of Ancient Greece and Rome, has existed in relative peace, ruled by Emperor Antonio, but nuclear tests in recent years have severely affected the cities via the earthquakes the tests produced. With the Seatopian capital badly affected by the most recent test, the Seatopians plan to unleash their civilization's beetle-styled titan, Megalon, to destroy the surface world out of vengeance.

On the surface, an inventor named Goro Ibuki, his little brother Rokuro, and Goro's friend Hiroshi Jinkawa are relaxing near a lake, when Seatopia makes itself known to the Earth by drying up the lake and using it as a base of operation. As they return home they are ambushed by agents of Seatopia who are trying to steal Jet Jaguar, a humanoid shaped robot under construction by the trio of inventors. However, the agents' first attempt is botched and they are forced to flee to safety.

Some time later, Jet Jaguar is completed but the trio of inventors are knocked unconscious by the returning Seatopian agents. The agents' plan is to use Jet Jaguar to guide Megalon to destroy whatever city Seatopia commands him. Goro and Rokuro are sent to be killed, while Hiroshi is taken hostage. Megalon is finally released to the surface while Jet Jaguar is put under the control of the Seatopians and is used to guide Megalon to attack Tokyo with the JSDF failing to defeat the monster. Eventually, the trio of heroes manage to escape and devise a plan to send Jet Jaguar to get Godzilla's help using Jet Jaguar's secondary control system.

After uniting with Japan's Defense Force, Goro manages to regain control of Jet Jaguar and sends the robot to Monster Island to bring Godzilla to fight Megalon. Without a guide to control its actions, Megalon flails around relentlessly and aimlessly fighting with the Defense Force and destroying the outskirts of Tokyo. The Seatopians learn of Jet Jaguar's turn and thus send out a distress call to their allies, the Nebulans, to send Gigan to assist Megalon.

As Godzilla journeys to fight Megalon, Jet Jaguar starts acting on its own and ignoring commands to the surprise of its inventors and grows to gigantic proportions to face Megalon itself until Godzilla arrives. The battle is roughly at a standstill until Gigan arrives and both Megalon and Gigan double team Jet Jaguar. Godzilla finally arrives to assist Jet Jaguar and the odds become even.

After a long and brutal fight, Gigan and Megalon both retreat and Godzilla and Jet Jaguar shake hands on a job well done. Jet Jaguar bids Godzilla farewell and Godzilla returns to Monster Island. Jet Jaguar returns to his human-size form and returns home with Goro and Rokuro.

== Cast ==
- Katsuhiko Sasaki as Inventor Goro Ibuki
- Hiroyuki Kawase as Rokuro Ibuki
- Yutaka Hayashi as Hiroshi Jinkawa
- Robert Dunham as Emperor Antonio of Seatopia and Seatopian agent on motorcycle
  - Gorō Naya voices Antonio in Japanese version
- Kotaro Tomita as Lead Seatopian Agent
- Wolf Ohtsuki as Seatopian Agent
- Gentaro Nakajima as Truck Driver
- Sakyo Mikami as Truck Driver's Assistant
- Tsugutoshi Komada as Jet Jaguar
- Shinji Takagi as Godzilla
- Hideto Date as Megalon
- Kenpachiro Satsuma as Gigan

== Production ==
=== Development ===
The origins of Megalon can be traced back to 1969's All Monsters Attack, as the original working idea for the film's antagonist Gabara was initially envisioned as a giant mole cricket called Gebara. The character was later reworked into Kaoru Mabuchi's 1971 treatment for Godzilla vs. the Space Monsters: Earth Defense Directive, a precursor to 1972's Godzilla vs. Gigan. The proposal called for Megalon to be paired with Gigan and King Ghidorah under the command of the hostile alien invader Miko, only to be defeated and driven off by the combined might of Godzilla, Anguirus, and a brand new monster called Majin Tuol. The next draft of the script, titled The Return of King Ghidorah!, retained the core villain cast of Gigan, King Ghidorah, and Megalon, but replaced Anguirus and Majin Tuol with Varan and Rodan. However, most of the proposed monsters were cut, leading to the final version of Godzilla vs. Gigan.

Contrary to popular belief, there is no evidence Godzilla vs. Megalon was originally planned as a Jet Jaguar solo film, and no Japanese sources have surfaced which claim otherwise. Rather, the creation of Jet Jaguar was the result of a contest Toho had for children in mid-to-late 1972. The winner of the contest was an elementary school student, who submitted the drawing of a robot called Red Arone. Red Arone was turned into a monster suit, but when the child was shown the suit, he became upset because the suit did not resemble his original design. The boy's original design was white but the costume was colored red, blue and yellow. Red Arone was used for publicity, but Toho had renamed the character Jet Jaguar and had special effects director Teruyoshi Nakano redesign the character, only keeping the colors from the Red Arone suit. The Red Arone suit had a different head and wings.

According to Teruyoshi Nakano, Godzilla vs. Megalon was a replacement project for another film that was cancelled at the last minute, and evidence suggests this cancelled film was Godzilla vs. Red Moon, slated for 1973. As a result, the project was postponed during pre-production. Screenwriter Shinichi Sekizawa had no time to write out a full script, and instead thought out a general story. Director Jun Fukuda ultimately ended up writing the screenplay.

The film had three early treatments, each written by Shinichi Sekizawa, one was titled Godzilla vs. The Megalon Brothers: The Undersea Kingdom's Annihilation Strategy which was completed in September 1972. The second was titled Insect Monster Megalon vs. Godzilla: Undersea Kingdom's Annihilation Strategy, which was turned in on September 5, 1972, and the third draft was submitted on September 7, 1972. The production time totaled nearly six months from planning to finish.

=== Creature design ===
According to Teruyoshi Nakano, the Godzilla suit used in this film (nicknamed "MegaroGoji" メガロゴジ ) was made in a week, making it the fastest Godzilla suit ever made to date. They did not have time to make the eyes work correctly, something they had more time to fix for Godzilla's five appearances on Toho's superhero TV series Zone Fighter (1973), which was produced around the same time.

The Megalon suit was one of the heaviest suits produced since the 1954 Godzilla suit, which made it even more difficult to raise the Megalon suit via wires in certain scenes up to the point where Nakano almost decided to scrap those scenes altogether. Since the film was shot in the winter, Katsuhiko Sasaki stated that director Jun Fukuda gave him and Yutaka Hayashi a shot of whiskey to warm them up.

The Gigan suit is similar to the previous design, but the suit was made thinner, less bulky, the horn on the head was less pointed, and the buzzsaw didn't move, since it was made of static pieces. This suit also has different-sized back fins, a more circular visor, scales running up the back/sides of the neck and longer legs compared to the original version.

=== Filming ===
Teruyoshi Nakano recalls how the film was rushed and that it took three weeks to shoot, stating, "It went into productions without enough preparation. There was no time to ask Mr. Sekizawa to write the script, so Mr. Sekizawa kind of thought up the general story and director Fukuda wrote the screenplay. The screenplay was completed right before crank-in". The film also heavily employs stock footage from previous films such as Mothra vs. Godzilla, Ghidorah the Three-Headed Monster (both from 1964), The War of the Gargantuas (1966), Ebirah, Horror of the Deep (1966), Destroy All Monsters (1968), Godzilla vs. Hedorah (1971), and Godzilla vs. Gigan (1972).

== English versions ==
Cinema Shares theatrical poster for the 1976 U.S. release of Godzilla vs. Megalon. The poster (which spoofs the theatrical poster for King Kong) incorrectly places the monsters atop the World Trade Center; no such scene (nor any scenes set in the United States at all) occurs in the film itself.

In 1976, Cinema Shares gave Godzilla vs. Megalon a wide theatrical release in the United States and launched a massive marketing campaign for the film, along with the poster, buttons with one of the four monsters' faces on them were released. Given away at theatrical showings was a comic that told a simplified version of the film, which incorrectly named Jet Jaguar as "Robotman" and Gigan as "Borodan". These incorrect names were also featured in the U.S. trailer.

Cinema Shares originally planned to use the uncut Toho international English version, but to ensure a G rating, several minor cuts were made, which resulted in the film running three minutes shorter than the original version. These cuts included a majority of the opening titles, several mild obscenities and some shots of barely visible pornographic magazine clips when the main characters are kidnapped in a truck.

Godzilla vs. Megalon is the first Godzilla film to receive an American prime time network television premiere, where it was broadcast nationwide at 9:00 PM on NBC on March 15, 1977. However, to accommodate commercials, the film was only shown in a one-hour time slot, which resulted in the film being cut down to 48 minutes. John Belushi hosted the broadcast where he did some skits, all in a Godzilla suit.

Mel Maron (who was president of Cinema Shares at the time) chose to release Godzilla vs. Megalon because he saw Godzilla as a heroic figure by that point and felt the timing was right to show children a hero who was a friendly monster and not Superman.

In 1988, New World Video intended to release the original uncut version of the English dub but declined the project because it lacked the budget that was required for a full release. However, despite this, the film was released uncut and in widescreen in 1992 by UK company Polygram Ltd as a double feature with Godzilla vs. Gigan. In 1998 the film was again released by UK company, 4 Front Video. As of now it appears those are the only two VHS tapes on the film that are unedited and in high quality. It was also released on DVD by Power Multimedia in 1999 in Taiwan. Originally the Sci-Fi Channel (now SyFy) showed the cut version, until finally in 2002 as Toho regained ownership of that title alongside Godzilla vs. Gigan and Godzilla vs. Mechagodzilla (both of which also were released by Cinema Shares) and broadcast the film fully uncut for the first time in the U.S.

=== U.S. copyright status ===
When Cinema Shares first distributed its English-dubbed version of Godzilla vs. Megalon theatrically in the United States in 1976, a copyright notice was not included, causing that U.S. release to enter the public domain under the copyright law then in effect; this did not eliminate Toho's copyright in the underlying Japanese film. This resulted in companies releasing poorly cropped, fullscreen VHS tapes mastered from pan and scan sources. This also led to the film being featured on an episode of Mystery Science Theater 3000.

On January 1, 1996, the film's U.S. copyright was restored, with Toho as the rights holder, pursuant to the Uruguay Round Agreements Act (URAA), codified at 17 U.S.C. § 104A.

== Release ==
=== Box office ===
In Japan, Godzilla vs. Megalon sold approximately 980,000 tickets. It was the first Godzilla film to sell less than one million admissions. It earned ¥220 million in Japan distribution income (rentals).

The film was a success in American theaters, earning $383,744 in its first three days in Texas and Louisiana alone. The film grossed about $20 million worldwide.

=== Critical response ===
A scene from the film depicting Godzilla dropkicking Megalon while sliding on his tail, a moment noted as "goofy" by many critics.

Godzilla vs. Megalon was released theatrically in America on May 9, 1976, though the San Francisco Chronicle indicates that it opened there in June, and The New York Times indicates that it opened in New York City on July 11. The New York Times film critic Vincent Canby, who a decade before had given a negative review to Ghidorah, the Three-Headed Monster, gave Godzilla vs. Megalon a generally positive review. In his review on July 12, 1976, Canby said, "Godzilla vs. Megalon completes the canonization of Godzilla...It's been a remarkable transformation of character – the dragon has become St. George...It's wildly preposterous, imaginative and funny (often intentionally). It demonstrates the rewards of friendship, between humans as well as monsters, and it is gentle."

Godzilla vs. Megalon has attracted the ire of many Godzilla fans in the decades since its original release. The film contributed to the reputation of Godzilla films in the United States as cheap children's entertainment that should not be taken seriously. It has been described as "incredibly, undeniably, mind-numbingly bad" and one of the "poorer moments" in the history of kaiju films.

Author Stephen Mark Rainey's critique of the film was strongly negative, published in Japanese Giants, issue four. 1977, edited and published by Bradford G. Boyle.

In particular, the special effects of the film have been heavily criticized. One review described the Godzilla costume as appearing to be "crossed with Kermit the Frog" and another sneeringly compared it to Godzilla vs. Gigan, stating that it did "everything wrong that Gigan did, and then some." However, most of the criticism is of the lack of actual special effects work, as most of it consists of stock footage from previous films, including Godzilla vs. Gigan and Ghidorah, the Three-Headed Monster, but a few pieces of effects work have garnered praise, specifically a scene where Megalon breaks through a dam and the draining of the lake. The other aspects of the film have been similarly skewered. The acting is usually described as flat and generally poor, and as not improving, or sometimes, worsening, the already weak script. One part of the film, on the other hand, has garnered almost universal praise: Godzilla's final attack on Megalon, a flying kick. It has been called the saving grace of the film, and was made famous by the mock exclamations of shock and awe displayed on Godzilla vs. Megalon's appearance on Mystery Science Theater 3000. Through the end of season three to the middle of season five, that clip would be shown during the opening of each show.

Despite all this, the film is also one of the most widely seen Godzilla films in the United States – it was popular in its initial theatrical release, largely because of an aggressive marketing campaign, including elaborate posters of the two title monsters battling atop New York City's World Trade Center towers, presumably to capitalize on the hype surrounding the Dino De Laurentiis remake of King Kong, which used a similar image for its own poster.

On review aggregator Rotten Tomatoes, approval rating of 38% based on 8 reviews, with an average rating of 4.7/10.

=== Home media ===
==== Japan ====
In 2023, Toho had announced 4K digital remasters for The Return of Godzilla and Godzilla vs. Megalon. The film was broadcast on the Japanese Movie Specialist Channel in November 2023, to commemorate the film's 50th anniversary and the then-latest release of Godzilla Minus One.

==== United States ====
The film was released numerous times in the VHS format, mostly as videos from bargain basement studios that featured the edited TV version, while PolyGram and 4 Front released the unedited version of the film in 1992 and 1998, respectively. Some rumors have circulated that the film's original VHS releases in the States were uncut, but there is no evidence confirming or denying this.

Media Blasters acquired the DVD rights to both Godzilla vs. Megalon and Destroy All Monsters. Both films were released under one of the company's divisions, Tokyo Shock. Media Blasters originally planned to release Godzilla vs. Megalon on DVD and Blu-ray on December 20, 2011; however, because of technical difficulties with the dubbing and Toho having yet to give its approval for the release, the DVD/Blu-ray release was delayed. Media Blasters finally released the film on August 14, 2012, but only on a bare-bones DVD and Blu-ray. Despite this, a manufacturing error led to several copies of the originally planned version featuring bonus content being released by accident. These special features versions are incredibly rare and are not labeled differently from the standard version, making them nearly impossible to find. This release was commercially the first to remaster the film to its original full-length version.

In 2019, the Japanese version and export English dub were included in a Blu-ray box set released by the Criterion Collection, which included all 15 films from the franchise's Shōwa era.
