= Mechagodzilla =

Robot kaiju from Godzilla franchise

- Godzilla character
- Mechagodzilla as portrayed by Kazunari Mori via suitmation in Godzilla vs. Mechagodzilla (1974)
- First appearance: Godzilla vs. Mechagodzilla (1974)
- Portrayed by: Shōwa era: Kazunari Mori; Heisei era: Wataru Fukuda; Millennium era: Hirofumi Ishigaki; Motokuni Nakagawa

In-universe information
- Aliases: The Bionic Monster; The Cosmic Monster; Mecha-G; Super Mechagodzilla; Kiryu; Type-3 Kiryu; MFS-3 Kiryu; Mechagodzilla 2 (Note: The Heisei Mechagodzilla is referenced as "Mechagodzilla 2" in multiple video games. The 1975 Showa Mechagodzilla is referenced as "Mechagodzilla 2" in Bandai's 2014 video game Godzilla, see Video games); Mechagodzilla 3 (Note: The Millennium Mechagodzilla is referenced as "Mechagodzilla 3" in multiple video games, see Video games); G Breaker
- Species: Weaponized Godzilla-like robot
- Affiliation: Humans, aliens, King Ghidorah(depending on depiction)

Mechagodzilla (Japanese: メカゴジラ, Hepburn: Mekagojira) is a mecha kaiju (a giant robotic monster) who first appeared in the 1974 film, Godzilla vs. Mechagodzilla. In the Showa era Godzilla films, Mechagodzilla is depicted as being constructed by extraterrestrial invaders to confront and destroy Godzilla. In the subsequent Heisei era, Millennium era and Monsterverse films, it is usually depicted as a man-made weapon designed to defend against Godzilla and other kaiju. The character is portrayed as a robotic counterpart of Godzilla with a vast array of high-tech weaponry. Along with King Ghidorah, Mechagodzilla is commonly considered to be an archenemy of Godzilla.

== Overview ==
=== Development ===
Mechagodzilla was conceived in 1974 as a more serious villain than its two immediate predecessors, Gigan and Megalon, whose films were considered creative disasters. Sources stated that Tomoyuki Tanaka, Jitsuzo Horiuchi and Yasuhiro Seto first came up with the idea for the character, with director Jun Fukuda and special effects director Teruyoshi Nakano agreeing on it. According to Tanaka, Mechagodzilla was inspired by both Mechani-Kong from the previous Toho film King Kong Escapes and the robot anime genre, which was popular at the time.

Effects director Teruyoshi Nakano also felt that a mechanical monster was cheaper to construct than the mutated animals Godzilla had previously faced. As the resulting Godzilla vs. Mechagodzilla proved to be a greater critical success than previous 1970s Godzilla films, the character was revived in 1975's Terror of Mechagodzilla. The film's screenplay was based on the winning entry of a story-writing competition won by Yukiko Takayama, who continued the darker tone of the previous film by adding the subplot of Mechagodzilla being cybernetically connected to a young woman. Mechagodzilla's design remained largely unchanged from its previous appearance, though it was made to look thinner and more angular, with a darker sheen and an MG2 insignia emblazoned on its upper arms. The film's original draft was going to have Mechagodzilla destroy Tokyo utterly, though the scale of destruction was cut down for budgetary reasons.

Early concept art of Mechagodzilla's Heisei incarnation, dubbed "Berserk"

Mechagodzilla was brought back in 1993's Godzilla vs. Mechagodzilla II, as the success of Godzilla vs. Mothra and the popularity of its main antagonist Mothra spurred Toho into reintroducing familiar characters rather than inventing new ones. Originally, the new Mechagodzilla was to be named "Berserk", and was envisioned as being a much more organic Godzilla-like creature which would later turn on its creators after becoming infected with a computer virus which makes it self-aware. Berserk would subsequently absorb more and more machinery, to the point of degenerating into a mass of metal and wires, though this concept was rejected early in pre-production.

As Mechagodzilla was intended to be a military defense weapon rather than an alien construct, the character was redesigned as looking sleeker and smoother. It was portrayed by suit actor Wataru Fukuda, and consisted of multiple separate elements which were worn like plate armor. Special effects artist Koichi Kawakita originally envisioned Mechagodzilla being able to split into aerial and terrestrial units, though this idea was scrapped in favor of the character merging with the flying battleship Garuda. The film was promoted through the children's program Adventure Godzilla-land, which portrayed Godzilla and Mechagodzilla as rival news anchors reporting on the events of the upcoming movie. Composer Akira Ifukube wrote a theme for Mechagodzilla incorporating a slow battle march with heavy percussion and pentatonic phrasing.

The decision to incorporate Mechagodzilla into the Millennium series was taken by producer Shōgo Tomiyama, who gave the general outline of what would become the story of Godzilla Against Mechagodzilla to Godzilla vs. Megaguirus director Masaaki Tezuka. Tezuka instructed his staff to research both cybernetics and DNA engineering in order to make the character scientifically plausible. Tezuka had initially wanted Mechagodzilla to be a much speedier robot than the one on film, envisioning it as becoming progressively more agile during its fight against Godzilla as the latter tore off its opponent's armaments. This incarnation of Mechagodzilla was deliberately shown being airlifted by carriers rather than flying directly into battle as the previous two incarnations had done, as Tezuka felt that it made little sense for Mechagodzilla to drain its energy in such a manner. Upon being asked why the Mechagodzilla suit wasn't painted with military camouflage colors, Tezuka answered that "Mechagodzilla doesn't need to hide." Tezuka had originally intended to have both Godzilla and Mechagodzilla die at the end of the film, but was forced to change this on the insistence of Toho managers, who felt that such an ending was too dark for a New Year movie release.

In the 2003 sequel Godzilla: Tokyo S.O.S., creature designer Shinichi Wakasa used the same mold to create a redesigned Mechagodzilla, which was meant to look more weathered than its predecessor. According to production designer Shinki Nishikawa, several other changes were made to the Mechagodzilla design's head, chest and arms in order to make the character look less heroic and more machine-like. The robot's back unit was reduced in size and flipped upside down, and the head was made smaller. As the previous design's shoulder cannons were considered uneven and unsophisticated-looking because of their rectangular shape, special effects director Eiichi Asada made them more pentagonal. As the character was supposed to rely more on its forearm cannons than in the previous film, Nishikawa made them larger and more powerful looking.

For Godzilla vs. Kong, Mechagodzilla's design was inspired by the Generation 1 Transformers due to their "simplicity." Director Adam Wingard attempted to avoid the "complex" designs from the Michael Bay Transformers films. Writer Max Borenstein had originally written Mechagodzilla into Godzilla: King of the Monsters. However, director Michael Dougherty scrapped the character during development.

Mechagodzilla wouldn't return until 2025, when Godzilla Minus One director, Takashi Yamazaki announced that he would be including Mechagodzilla for the next film, Godzilla the Ride: Great Clash, where it appears as the Kiju type 0‐G Breaker (Japanese: Kiju型0Gブレーカー, Hepburn: Kiju-gata 0 G burēkā), also known as the "G Breaker". The design was revealed on July 1, 2025, one month before Great Clash was released to the Seibuen Amusement Park.

=== Arsenal ===
The Showa Mechagodzilla stands 50 metres (160 ft) in height and weighs 40,000 metric tons. It is built from "space titanium", and is capable of launching missiles from its fingers, toes and knees, as well as firing Space Beams from its eyes and a Cross Attack Beam from its chest unit. It also possesses jets in its feet, allowing it to fly. Its head can spin 360°, and can form a force field capable of repelling and shocking opponents. The upgraded model featured in Terror of Mechagodzilla included revolving missiles, and was no longer vulnerable to decapitation, as its main computer was housed in an external power source. Once Mechagodzilla's head was removed, the machine was able to continue to fight, possessing a Head Controller capable of firing a concentrated laser with the same strength as its regular beams.

The Heisei Mechagodzilla stands at 120 metres (390 ft) in height, weighs 150,000 metric tons, and is powered by a nuclear reactor which derives its energy from heavy hydrogen and helium-3 in pellet form. Its frame is coated in an armor made of synthetic diamond codenamed T-1, allowing the robot to resist Godzilla's atomic breath as well as absorb its power to energize its Plasma Grenades, an energy weapon housed in its abdomen. Additional armaments include Mega Buster ray fired from its mouth, Laser Cannons in its eyes, missiles fired from its shoulders and hips, jet propulsors on its back and behind its hips to fly and two harpoons known as the G-Crusher fired from its arms. The G-Crusher is capable of sending large amounts of electric current through the cables. The model is later combined with the flying battleship Garuda, thus allowing it to hover and adding two additional High Power Maser Beam Cannons to its arsenal.

Kiryu, the Millennium Mechagodzilla, stands at 60 metres (200 ft) in height, weighs 40,000 metric tons, and is piloted remotely from a control craft. The mecha can be remotely recharged from the ground using microwaves that are relayed through a power system on one of the command aircraft, and then beamed back down to the robot. Its armaments include a Twin Maser Cannon in its mouth, railguns on its hands, a back unit with missiles and boosters, a maser blade in its right hand, reactors on its flanks and hips to fly and two rocket launchers on its shoulders. Its most powerful and most energetically costly weapon is the Absolute Zero Cannon housed in its chest, which fires a beam capable of flash freezing enemies. In Godzilla: Tokyo S.O.S., the Absolute Zero Cannon is replaced with a Triple Hyper Maser Cannon, its right hand can collapse into a drill and he can deploy a metal wire from his chest to capture Godzilla..

The Anime Trilogy Mechagodzilla stands 50 meters in height, weighs 30,000 metric tons, and is powered by artificial intelligence and made from nanometal. In the novel: Project Mechagodzilla, its arsenal includes a Blade Launcher, Convergent Neutron Cannon, Laminated Heat-Resistant Armored Plate, Flight, Hyper Lance, plasma booster, Thermal Energy Buffer Layer and Tail Blow. When it forms Mechagodzilla city, the defenses include gun cannons, EMP Harpoons, and a force field to protect itself when fired upon.

In Godzilla vs. Kong, Mechagodzilla stands at 122 metres (400 ft) in height, towering over Godzilla, weighs 100,000 metric tons, and is telepathically piloted through a cybernetic neural network developed from King Ghidorah's only surviving brain (from a head severed by Godzilla in Godzilla: King of the Monsters). Its weaponry includes a Proton Scream fired from its mouth, missiles fired from its shoulders and chest, jet boosters on its back, plasma punches, buzzsaws in its fingers and a drill at the end of its tail.

== Film history ==
=== Shōwa period (1974–1975) ===
In Godzilla vs. Mechagodzilla, Mechagodzilla is created by the Black Hole Planet 3 aliens, also known as the Simians, in order to conquer Earth before their homeworld gets destroyed by an expanding black hole. First appearing in a pseudo-flesh outer covering and masquerading as the real Godzilla, Mechagodzilla attacks Japan and overpowers Godzilla's ally Anguirus. Godzilla appears and destroys the pseudo-flesh disguise, forcing Mechagodzilla to reveal itself in full. Godzilla and Mechagodzilla's initial battle results in a tie, as Godzilla is severely wounded and Mechagodzilla is forced back into the Simian's base for repair. Mechagodzilla is deployed again but is overpowered through the combined efforts of Godzilla and King Caesar. Godzilla ultimately destroys Mechagodzilla by tearing its head off, causing it to explode upon the self-destruction of the Simians' base.

The Simians, now under the leadership of Mugal, return and rebuild Mechagodzilla in Terror of Mechagodzilla. This time, it is further modified with living human brain cells and has its control circuitry integrated into the body of the formerly human cyborg Katsura Mafune. Mechagodzilla is teamed up with the dinosaur Titanosaurus, who is controlled by Katsura's crazed father. Although Mechagodzilla survives another decapitation during a battle against Godzilla, it is once more defeated after Katsura commits suicide, destroying the robot's controls and freezing it long enough for Godzilla to use its atomic heat ray on Mechagodzilla's headless body, causing it to explode.

=== Heisei period (1993) ===
Super Mechagodzilla featured in Godzilla vs. Mechagodzilla II (top); Mechagodzilla, also known as Kiryu, featured in Godzilla: Tokyo SOS (bottom).

In Godzilla vs. Mechagodzilla II, Mechagodzilla is built as an anti-Godzilla weapon by the United Nations Godzilla Countermeasures Center using 23rd-century technology reverse engineered from the remains of Mecha-King Ghidorah. Mechagodzilla overpowers Godzilla in Kyoto, but is rendered harmless by a voltage backsurge caused by Godzilla. Mechagodzilla is recovered and merged with the smaller airship Garuda to form Super-Mechagodzilla (スーパーメカゴジラ, Supa-Mekagojira). This combined mecha later fights both Fire Rodan and Godzilla. He proceeds to cripple Godzilla by destroying his secondary brain and mortally wounds Rodan. Rodan then sacrifices his energy to revive Godzilla, who begins emitting heat strong enough to melt Super-Mechagodzilla's armor. He then uses uses his new red spiral atomic breath to destroy the weakened mecha.

In Godzilla vs. SpaceGodzilla, it is revealed that Mechagodzilla's remains were salvaged and used to construct Moguera.

=== Millennium period (2002–2003) ===
The Millennium incarnation is featured in two films: Godzilla Against Mechagodzilla and Godzilla: Tokyo S.O.S. and is referenced as Kiryu (機龍, Kiryū), derived from Kikai Ryu (Japanese for "machine dragon") or "Kōryū" (Japanese for steel dragon). When a second Godzilla appears in 1999, the Japanese military creates a Mechagodzilla built around the skeleton of the original Godzilla from 1954 and a DNA computing-based operating system. During its first battle with Godzilla four years later in 2003, Kiryu's genetic memories of its 1954 incarnation are awakened, and it proceeds to attack Tokyo, free from the controls of its pilot until its power drains. During its second battle with Godzilla, Kiryu forces Godzilla to retreat after using its Absolute Zero Cannon.

In Godzilla: Tokyo S.O.S., taking place one year later in 2004, Mothra's fairies warn Japan that Kiryu's creation is a violation of the natural order and that Mothra would gladly take the cyborg's place in protecting Japan, should Kiryu be dismantled. The ultimatum is declined, as Kiryu was built partially to defend against a second attack from Mothra herself. Godzilla eventually appears, prompting Mothra and Kiryu to cooperate. Kiryu momentarily is forced to fight Godzilla alone after Mothra is killed, but is later assisted by Mothra's larvae, who encase Godzilla in a silk webbing, and Kiryu is given orders to terminate him. However, Kiryu's soul has awakened once again, and it instead grabs hold of Godzilla, flies out to sea, and submerges both Godzilla and itself in the depths of the ocean (though not before ejecting its human occupant to safety).

=== Reiwa period (2017–2025) ===
Mechagodzilla appears briefly in Godzilla: Planet of the Monsters, the first film in the anime trilogy. The mecha is designed and constructed by humans and bilusaludo - the latter one of two alien races who made contact with humans in an attempt to rescue them - as a countermeasure against Godzilla. But the mech is never activated as Godzilla attacked the construction facility forcing them to abandon it. Though not seen again, the mech is referenced several other times throughout the film. In Godzilla: City on the Edge of Battle, the second film in the trilogy, the remnants of Mechagodzilla's AI rebuild the facility it was created in by utilizing nanometal to help defeat Godzilla, aptly named "Mechagodzilla City". It also creates three battlesuits with flight capabilities called "Vultures".

Haruo and his forces use the city as a base of operations to destroy Godzilla. When Mechagodzilla City begins assimilating its surroundings and living beings with its nanometal under the command of the Bilusaludo, and is predicted to assimilate the entire planet prompting Haruo to destroy its command center, giving Godzilla the opening to destroy it. In Godzilla: The Planet Eater, some nanometal survives within Yuko's body which Professor Martin extracts and applies to the last Vulture intending to rebuild civilization. Realizing this will only repeat the mistakes that prompted Godzilla's advent, endanger the Houtua and risk the return of Ghidorah, Harou takes Yuko and the last Vulture and flies all three towards Godzilla in a suicide charge to save the Houtua from mankind's mistakes.

Mechagodzilla appears in the film Godzilla the Ride: Great Clash, referenced to as the "G Breaker", constructed by the Emergency Defense against Gargantuan Encounter (EDGE) and deployed to battle Godzilla. The G-Breaker briefly overpowers Godzilla, but eventually has its head torn off by him.

=== Monsterverse (2021) ===
Mechagodzilla was featured in the 2021 film Godzilla vs. Kong. Secretly built by Apex Cybernetics as an anti-Titan weapon, it is designed to wipe out the Titans and replace Godzilla, remotely piloted by Ren Serizawa via a telepathic link originating from a skull of Ghidorah's left head (acquired after it was torn off by Godzilla in Godzilla: King of the Monsters prior), though conventional energy sources prove insufficient to power it to full capacity.

As Mechagodzilla is being built at a facility in Pensacola, Florida, Godzilla responds to a bioacoustic signal emitted from the mecha's eye similar to the ORCA device, which causes him to search for and eventually attack the facility. Due to the secrecy of the project, the public misinterprets this as Godzilla having gone rogue, resulting in Monarch and Apex taking Kong to the Hollow Earth in search of an energy source to confront Godzilla with; simultaneously, Apex covertly plans to use it to power Mechagodzilla, now housed within Victoria Peak. Godzilla and Kong clash en route to the Hollow Earth in the Tasman Sea, but ultimately the team finds and retrieves the power source, in the form of "Hollow Earth Energy".

After Godzilla and Kong fight a second time in Hong Kong, Serizawa charges the mechanized titan with the untested Hollow Earth's energies, upon pressure from Apex Cybernetics' CEO Walter Simmons. However, the process unexpectedly allows Ghidorah's mind to possess Mechagodzilla, who then kills both Simmons and Serizawa, goes on a rampage in the city, and faces Godzilla. Godzilla is easily overwhelmed, and is nearly killed before Kong joins the battle. Kong's axe initially proves ineffective against Mechagodzilla, as its energy was depleted after battling Godzilla. As Mechagodzilla maintains the upper hand, Josh Valentine tampers with its control panel via alcohol spillage, stalling it long enough for Godzilla to supercharge Kong's axe with his atomic breath. Kong then uses his fully powered axe to dismember Mechagodzilla's limbs, and finishes it off by tearing off its head.

== In other media ==
The various incarnations of Mechagodzilla have appeared in other media associated with the series, such as video games, television shows, and comics.

=== In video games ===
Various incarnations of Mechagodzilla have appeared in many Godzilla video games, including Godzilla: Monster of Monsters!, Super Godzilla, Godzilla: Destroy All Monsters Melee, Godzilla: Save the Earth, Godzilla: Unleashed, and Godzilla (2014).

Kiryu along with Godzilla, Gigan and Destoroyah become DLC guest stars in the indie game GigaBash.

The Monsterverse Mechagodzilla appears as a playable skin in Epic Games' Fortnite, alongside Godzilla and Kong.

=== Television ===
While Mechagodzilla did not appear in Godzilla: The Series, a sequel to Godzilla (1998), the first Godzilla was reanimated as a cyborg called Cyber-Godzilla in the Monster Wars trilogy.

A Shōwa-inspired Mechagodzilla appears in the post-credits scene of the final episode of the anime series Godzilla Singular Point, though the lab's computer screens identify him as Robogodzilla.

=== In film ===
Mechagodzilla appears in the 2018 science fiction action film Ready Player One where he is seen battling the Iron Giant and the RX-78-2 Gundam. This time, Mechagodzilla is remodeled and resembles the 1974 Shōwa version, the 2002 Kiryū, and Noriyoshi Ohrai's poster for Godzilla vs. Mechagodzilla II.

== Appearances ==
=== Films ===
- Godzilla vs. Mechagodzilla (1974)
- Terror of Mechagodzilla (1975)
- Godzilla vs. Mechagodzilla II (1993)
- Godzilla Against Mechagodzilla (2002)
- Godzilla: Tokyo S.O.S. (2003)
- Godzilla: Final Wars (2004; toy)
- Godzilla: Planet of the Monsters (2017)
- Ready Player One (2018)
- Godzilla: City on the Edge of Battle (2018) as Mechagodzilla City
- Godzilla vs. Kong (2021)

=== Television ===
- Godzilland (1992 - 1993)
- Godzilla Island (1997 - 1998)
- Godzilla: The Series (1998 - 2000) as Cyber-Godzilla
- Godzilla Singular Point (2021)

=== Video games ===
- Godzilla: Monster of Monsters! (NES - 1988) as Mechagodzilla (1974)
- Godzilla / Godzilla-Kun: Kaijuu Daikessen (Game Boy - 1990) as Mechagodzilla (1974)
- Battle Soccer: Field no Hasha (Super Famicom - 1992) as Mechagodzilla (1974)
- Super Godzilla (Super NES - 1993) as Mechagodzilla (1974) and Mechagodzilla 2
- Kaijū-ō Godzilla / King of the Monsters, Godzilla (Game Boy - 1993)
- Godzilla: Battle Legends (Turbo Duo - 1993)
- Godzilla: Monster War / Godzilla: Destroy All Monsters (Super NES - 1994)
- Godzilla Giant Monster March (Game Gear - 1995)
- Godzilla Trading Battle (PlayStation - 1998) as Mechagodzilla (1974) and Mechagodzilla 2
- Godzilla Generations (Dreamcast – 1998) as Mechagodzilla (1974)
- Godzilla: Destroy All Monsters Melee (GameCube, Xbox - 2002/2003) as Mechagodzilla 2 and Mechagodzilla 3 (Xbox exclusive)
- Godzilla: Domination! (Game Boy Advance - 2002) as Mechagodzilla 2 and Mechagodzilla 3
- Godzilla: Save the Earth (Xbox, PlayStation 2 - 2004) as Mechagodzilla 2 and Mechagodzilla 3
- Godzilla: Unleashed (Wii, PlayStation 2 – 2007) as Mechagodzilla (1974, Wii exclusive), Mechagodzilla 2 and Kiryu
- Godzilla Unleashed: Double Smash (Nintendo DS – 2007) as Kiryu
- Godzilla on Monster Island (AVP Slot – 2011) as Kiryu
- Godzilla (PlayStation 3, PlayStation 4 - 2014/2015) as Mechagodzilla (1974, PS4 exclusive), Mechagodzilla 2 (1975), Super Mechagodzilla, and Kiryu
- City Shrouded in Shadow (PS4 – 2017) as Kiryu
- Godzilla Defense Force (2019)
- GigaBash (PS4, PS5, Steam, Epic Games - 2022, Nintendo Switch, Xbox - 2023) as Kiryu

=== Music ===
- MeccaGodZilla, also known as RAVAGE, is a rapper & producer who is a member of rap group Monsta Island Czars

=== Literature ===
- Godzilla vs. the Robot Monsters (1998)
- Ready Player One (novel 2011) as Kiryu
- Godzilla: Kingdom of Monsters (comic 2011 - 2012)
- Godzilla: Gangsters and Goliaths (comic 2011)
- Godzilla: Legends (comic 2011 - 2012)
- Godzilla: Ongoing (comic 2012)
- Godzilla: The Half-Century War (comic 2012 - 2013)
- Godzilla: Rulers of Earth (comic 2013 - 2015) as Mechagodzilla (1974) and Kiryu
- Godzilla: Oblivion (comic 2016)
- Godzilla: Monster Apocalypse (novel 2017)
- Godzilla: Project Mechagodzilla (novel 2018)
- Justice League vs. Godzilla vs. Kong (2023–2024) as Monsterverse Mechagodzilla

== Reception ==
The character has generally been positively received. It was rated No. 15 of the 50 Best Movie Robots by The Times, beating other such legends as C-3PO from Star Wars, the T-1000 from Terminator 2: Judgment Day, and Optimus Prime from Transformers. Complex listed the character as No. 6 on its "The 15 Most Badass Kaiju Monsters of All Time" list, while IGN listed it as No. 4 on their "Top 10 Japanese Movie Monsters" list.

Since its debut in 1974 with Godzilla vs. Mechagodzilla, critics and historians have widely recognized Mechagodzilla as one of Godzilla's most recognizable recurring opponents and a principal character in the franchise, due to its repeated appearances in multiple films and popularity among audiences.

== In popular culture ==
- In an episode of 30 Rock's fifth season, "Chain Reaction of Mental Anguish", Kiryu appears as one of the characters in a theme restaurant.
- In Ernest Cline's novel Ready Player One and its film adaptation, the main antagonist Nolan Sorrento controls a full-size Mechagodzilla replica during the climactic battle in a virtual reality environment.
- Mechagodzilla makes a cameo appearance in the Ugly Americans episode "Kong of Queens", in which King Kong fights Godzilla (King Kong's children watching the movie King Kong vs. Godzilla), and another when Kong punches a wall (after an argument with Mark Lily on the phone), the Showa-era Mechagodzilla was seen having breakfast.
- Mechagodzilla was parodied by the series South Park in their episode "Mecha-Streisand", which features singer Barbra Streisand becoming a gigantic mechanical monster.

== Bibliography ==
- Kalat, David (2010). A Critical History and Filmography of Toho's Godzilla Series (2nd ed.). Jefferson, NC: McFarland & Co. ISBN 9780786447497.
- Ryfle, Steve (1998). Japan's Favorite Mon-Star: The Unauthorized Biography of the Big G. ECW Press. ISBN 1550223488.
- Solomon, Brian (2017). Godzilla FAQ: All That's Left to Know About the King of the Monsters. Applause Theatre & Cinema Books. ISBN 9781495045684.
