= Godzilla: Kaijū Daikessen =

1994 video game

- Developer: Alfa System
- Publisher: Toho
- Composers: PiPo Morinaga; Takuya Yasuda; Yuji Yoshikawa
- Series: Godzilla
- Platform: Super Famicom
- Release: JP: December 9, 1994
- Genre: 2D fighting
- Modes: Single-player, multiplayer

Godzilla: Kaijū Daikessen (ゴジラ 怪獣大決戦; lit. "Godzilla: Strange Beast Great War") is a 2D fighting video game released in 1994 for the Super Famicom. The game was developed by Alfa System and published by Toho. It was the second game based on Toho's Godzilla franchise to be released on Super Famicom, following 1993's Super Godzilla.

The May 1995 issue of Nintendo Power previewed a planned release of the game in North America, titled Godzilla: Destroy All Monsters, but the game was never released for unknown reasons, but most likely due to the rise of the next generation of consoles, such as the Nintendo 64 and the PlayStation. A similarly titled game, Godzilla: Destroy All Monsters Melee, was released in North America in 2002.

== Gameplay ==
=== Single player ===
In the single-player game, players are able to choose from Godzilla, Anguirus, King Ghidorah, Gigan, Megalon, Mechagodzilla, Biollante and Mothra. No matter which monster the players select, they are taken to a map of Japan and must select their opponent to battle. Battles take place in the familiar 2D fighting screen seen in Street Fighter II and other games of the genre, though the game plays more akin to the SNES Dragon Ball Z: Super Butōden fighting games. Each round has a time period of sixty seconds, during which each monster fights with a variety of attacks to wear their opponent's energy bar down and win the round. At the end of the round, the player's score is tallied up based on time, energy and the level of their opponent. Once every enemy monster has been defeated, the player enters the eighth and final round and must face Mechagodzilla/Super Mechagodzilla or Gotengo. Upon the defeat of one of those monsters, the credits roll and the game ends.

Each monster has a variety of standard and unique, special attacks, as well as the ability to block. Standard attacks include light and heavy physical attacks (punch, kick, etc.) and varying degrees of energy-based attacks, a dash attack and a grab attack. Each monster also has the ability to stun the opponent with a loud roar. As a succession of hits is landed, the monster will glow red and be stunned for several seconds, while a separate energy bar fluctuates, either to increase the strength of the monster's attack or the possibility of stunning the opponent. Monsters are able to use their projectile attacks to block oncoming projectiles, and sometimes the two can clash in a brief test-of-strength encounter.

=== Multi-player ===
The game supports the standard two-player Vs Mode, the only difference being in the player's ability to select Mechagodzilla 2 and Atragon, presumably, to choose their own battleground.

=== Playable monsters ===
Godzilla: King of the Monsters, Godzilla attacks using punches and his tail to smack opponents away, filling the void of an all-rounded fighter. Godzilla's charge attack is to rush the opponent and headbutt and bite at them, while his projectile attacks are the standard Atomic Ray, which can also be directed in a clockwise fashion, and his more powerful Red Spiral Ray.

Anguirus: Small and light, Anguirus can land multiple hits but takes damage quite easily. Anguirus can attack by spinning his spiked body and tail and by cannonballing himself out of the sky, however, he has no energy or projectile-based attacks.

King Ghidorah: Godzilla's most persistent foe, King Ghidorah is large and has a variety of attacks. Ghidorah can fly and attacks using its three heads and its large feet. King Ghidorah can also blast opponents with its electrical energy beams and whip them with its tail.

Gigan: Faster than Godzilla and tougher than Anguirus, Gigan attacks using its hooked arms and flame breath, able to whip opponents with its tail, rip them off with his body-mounted buzzsaw and blast them with a thin red energy beam. Gigan has a rushing combination attack where it grabs, kicks, punches and blasts its opponent away with a back-flip kick.

Megalon: Megalon is an unbalanced character in the game. Attacking with its horned head, Megalon is slow but makes up for its lack of grace with incredibly powerful special attacks. Megalon's standard projectile is a small beam of yellow electricity but it also drops a ball of fire onto the battlefield, incinerating the opponent and causing massive damage. It has a drill-combo attack that also causes considerable damage. Megalon can also launch itself like a torpedo at its opponents.

Mechagodzilla: Slow but varied, Mechagodzilla can fly, extend its limbs and unleash a variety of projectile attacks, while being extremely durable. Mechagodzilla has an energy shield to block attacks, as well as the standard block, fires missiles and lasers at its opponent and has a special move where it unleashes all of its arsenal in one blast, causing significant damage.

Biollante: A monstrous clone of Godzilla, Biollante is slow moving but powerful. Biollante attacks using its large mouth and tentacled appendages, tossing spores at the opponent.

Mothra: Light and quick, Mothra is also extremely weak. Mothra can fly about the upper part of the screen out of reach of normal attacks, causing its opponent to use jump attacks instead. Mothra can divebomb the opponent, leave spores, shoot energy beams and attack with her wings. Battra makes a cameo appearance during one of Mothra's special attacks, when it combines with her to give a more powerful supporting eyelight attack on her opponent.

Mechagodzilla (Heisei): The boss opponent for the game is on easy mode, Mechagodzilla 2 is only selectable in two-player mode. Mechagodzilla 2 is faster than its predecessor and has stronger attacks, extending its limbs further, attacking with concussive lasers and bombs and traveling like a tank. His special ability is a projector in his chest that makes him able to absorb and re-release enemy projectiles back to his attacker. Mechagodzilla 2, however, seems to block less, in favour of a more aggressive attack pattern.

Super Mechagodzilla: When the game is beaten on medium difficulty, an enhanced version of Mechagodzilla 2 confronts the player, proving the most difficult challenge of the game through its joining with Garuda. This character is only unlockable by code.

Gotengo: This character is unlocked in hard mode. Unlike the monsters, Gotengo is a ship with a drill that can fire missiles at its opponent, it can fly, can fire lasers, release an electricity field and a freeze weapon at the monsters.
