= Godzilla (Heisei) =

Fictional monster, or kaiju

Godzilla (Heisei era)
- Godzilla character
- Godzilla, as portrayed by Kenpachiro Satsuma via suitmation in Godzilla vs. King Ghidorah (1991).
- First appearance: The Return of Godzilla (1984)
- Last appearance: Godzilla vs. Destoroyah (1995)
- Portrayed by: Kenpachiro Satsuma; Wataru Fukuda (Godzillasaurus)

In-universe information
- Species: Mutated amphibious dinosaur
- Gender: Male
- Family: Godzilla Junior (adopted son)
- Home: Lagos Island (1944) (Note: These events are depicted in the Heisei-era film timeline, not by the film release date); Baas Island (1995)

Heisei Godzilla (Japanese: 平成ゴジラ, Hepburn: Heisei Gojira) refers to the version of the character from the Heisei continuity of the Godzilla franchise. The denotation of "Heisei" is derived from the Japanese political period during which a majority of the films in this series were released; starting with The Return of Godzilla in 1984, and ending with Godzilla vs. Destoroyah in 1995.

Over the course of the series, Godzilla evolved from being a purely antagonistic force to an anti-hero merely happening to save humanity by defeating other more threatening monsters. He is increasingly portrayed as misunderstood and more a force of nature, as touted by the recurring character Miki Saegusa. He ultimately met his demise in Godzilla vs. Destoroyah after absorbing the uranium deposits from Baas Island, dying over the course of days as his body began melting down, being succeeded by Godzilla Junior.

Having appeared in the more films than any other design, the Heisei version of Godzilla has persisted in representing both the character and the franchise as a whole despite being retired from the films since 1995. It is still the primary look used in marketing, merchandize, video games, and comic adaptations.

== Overview ==
=== Name ===
When Godzilla vs. Biollante had been released, Godzilla at the time was commonly called the New Godzilla (Japanese: 新ゴジラ, Hepburn: Shin Gojira). This name would be used to dub Godzilla Junior's adult form in Godzilla vs. Destoroyah (1995). For Godzilla vs. Mechagodzilla II, the Baby Godzilla's species is named "Godzillasaurus", a combination of "Godzilla" and the suffix -saurus, derived from the Greek term "saûros", meaning "lizard" in English.

In Godzilla vs. Destoroyah, after absorbing massive amounts of radiation, Godzilla reaches a burning state that causes his body to slowly melt down. Although it is usually known as Burning Godzilla (Japanese: バーニングゴジラ, Hepburn: Bāningu Gojira), some concept art refers to this form of Godzilla as Red Godzilla (Japanese: 赤きゴジラ, Hepburn: Akaki Gojira).

== Character's biography ==
In the continuity of the Heisei series, Godzilla is the second member of his kind to appear, succeeding the original Godzilla that attacked Tokyo in 1954 and was subsequently killed by the Oxygen Destroyer. Both individuals were originally of a species of theropod dinosaur called Godzillasaurus that survived the K-T Extinction, and were living in the Marshall Islands. While one Godzillasaurus would go on to be mutated by the Castle Bravo thermonuclear test and become the Godzilla that would attack in 1954, the other would be living on the island of Lagos in 1944 when Japanese and American forces fought there during the Gilbert and Marshall Islands campaign in World War II. Stumbling into the middle of a naval exchange between the two military forces, the Godzillasaurus drove the Americans away, inadvertently saving the Japanese soldiers, only to be grievously injured by naval gunfire.

Soon after, a group of time travelers called the Futurians from the 23rd century arrived on Lagos Island. As part of a scheme to prevent Japan from becoming a global economic superpower in the future, the Futurians sought to erase Godzilla from history, seeing him as the main obstacle in their plan. They teleported the Godzillasaurus to the Bering Sea, believing it would prevent it from being mutated by Castle Bravo. However, the Futurians misinterpreted this Godzillasaurus as being the same individual that would become the 1954 Godzilla; this new Godzillasaurus would remain in a comatose state beneath the sea until a Soviet nuclear submarine crashed into its vicinity in the 1970s. The radiation from the submarine ended up mutating the dinosaur into a new Godzilla anyway. In 1984, Godzilla would be roused to the surface by a volcanic eruption, setting in motion the events of The Return of Godzilla (1984).

=== The Return of Godzilla (1984) ===
Godzilla, as portrayed by Kenpachiro Satsuma in The Return of Godzilla.

Godzilla makes his first appearance when the eruption draws him to the surface near Daikoku Island. His emergence is witnessed by the crew of the Japanese fishing vessel Yahata Maru, and though Godzilla ignores the ship, sea lice mutated and enlarged from feeding on his irradiated blood invade it and slaughter the crew. Godzilla later attacks a Soviet nuclear submarine, which causes an international crisis across Japan. Godzilla finally arrives in Japan, coming ashore to feed on a nuclear power plant in Shizuoka Prefecture. His attack is stalled, however, when he is distracted by a homing signal from a passing flock of birds. Godzilla attacks again later that night, this time rampaging through the heart of Tokyo.

He obliterates a Japan Self-Defense Forces attack force that attempts to stop him, and then battles the Super X, an advanced aerial vehicle. The Super X nearly kills Godzilla using radiation-numbing cadmium armaments, but a radioactive lightning storm caused by an accidental orbital nuclear strike by the Soviets revitalizes him. Godzilla destroys the Super X, but is then lured out of Tokyo and to Mount Mihara on Ōshima Island by an artificial homing signal. A subsequent controlled volcanic eruption buries Godzilla alive in the mountain.

=== Godzilla vs. Biollante (1989) ===
Samples of Godzilla's DNA are recovered from the ruins of his rampage, falling into the hands of multiple organizations and leading to the creation of an Anti-Nuclear Energy Bacteria (ANEB) and a plant-hybrid entity known as Biollante. Five years later, Godzilla is released from Mt. Mihara by terrorists from the genetics corporation BioMajor, and immediately begins attacking Japan. He confronts Biollante in her rose form at the Lake Ikeda laboratory of Dr. Genishiro Shiragami, defeating her easily.

Godzilla then begins making his way to Tsuruga to feed on a nuclear power plant, only to be redirected to Osaka by the psychic Miki Saegusa. During his rampage through Osaka, Godzilla is successfully injected with a dose of the ANEB by Colonel Goro Gondo. The ANEB does not immediately take effect, but a second battle with a regenerated Biollante at Wakasa Bay heats up Godzilla's body temperature, allowing the ANEB to weaken him. While Biollante disintegrates, Godzilla weakly trudges his way back into the ocean.

=== Godzilla vs. King Ghidorah (1991) ===
The ANEB leaves Godzilla in a semi-comatose state for two years, with the JSDF constantly monitoring him. The Futurians finally arrive in 1992 Japan to enact their plot to eliminate Godzilla; though they don't prevent his existence, their actions do lead to the creation of King Ghidorah, a genetically engineered three-headed dragon created from the DNA of an extraterrestrial found on Venus in the distant future. Ghidorah is unleashed upon Japan to destroy it, but Godzilla is purged of the ANEB when he destroys and feeds off of a nuclear submarine deployed by the Teiyo Group.

The sub's radiation energizes Godzilla and further increases his size, and he makes landfall in Hokkaido where he fights and defeats Ghidorah in a valley. Godzilla then rampages from Sapporo to Tokyo, where he is confronted by Mecha-King Ghidorah, a cyborg version of Ghidorah piloted by the benevolent Futurian Emmy Kano. Ghidorah carries Godzilla out to sea, with Emmy escaping and Ghidorah being destroyed in the process.

=== Godzilla vs. Mothra (1992) ===
Only a few short months later, a meteoroid crashes in the Izu–Ogasawara Trench near where Godzilla is resting, rousing him to the surface. He comes upon the egg of the primordial divine moth Mothra as it is being transferred to Japan from Infant Island of Indonesia by the Marutomo Company's ship, and witnesses it hatch into Mothra's larval form.

Godzilla attacks Mothra unprovoked, and nearly kills her until Battra, Mothra's dark and ferocious male counterpart, intervenes. While Mothra escapes in the confusion, Battra pulls Godzilla into an underwater brawl, where stray blasts from Godzilla's atomic breath and Battra's prism eye beams create a giant crack on the Philippine Sea Plate. The two monsters are swallowed up by the fissure, but still alive, and instead push their way through Earth's mantle before emerging from the crust.

Godzilla emerges from Mount Fuji and decimates a JSDF force that attempts to slow his advance. He makes his way to Yokohama to confront Mothra and Battra, who have metamorphoses into their imago forms, at Yokohama Cosmo World. Godzilla disrupts an airborne duel between the two and overpowers them both, prompting the moths to forge an alliance against him. Mothra and Battra immobilize Godzilla with a plethora of energy-based attacks, and then carry him away from the city. Godzilla kills Battra mid-flight, forcing Mothra to drop them both into the ocean.

=== Godzilla vs. Mechagodzilla II (1993) ===
Godzilla remains in the ocean for a year before finally reappearing in 1994, after intercepting a bio-acoustic signal from Adonoa Island, a landmass in the Bering Strait once used by Soviet as a dumping ground for radioactive waste. He finds the source of the signal, a living Godzillasaurus egg, being smuggled away by scientists from the United Nations Godzilla Countermeasures Center (UNGCC), a special branch of the United Nations designed to study and combat Godzilla and other monsters.

After battling and incapacitating Rodan, a Pteranodon irradiated by the island's radioactive contamination, Godzilla pursues the egg to the UNGCC's headquarters in Kyoto. En route, Godzilla is confronted by Mechagodzilla, a massive combat mecha modeled after the former created by the UNGCC from the remains of Mecha-King Ghidorah and controlled by its military branch, G-Force.

Mechagodzilla's large assortment of weaponry grievously injures Godzilla, but he manages to overcome the mecha by using his nuclear pulse to disable it. He then arrives in Kyoto where the egg has hatched into the juvenile Godzillasaurus, which Azusa Gojo named him Baby Godzilla. Sensing Baby is afraid of his presence, Godzilla leaves the city and returns to the ocean. G-Force later lures Godzilla into a second confrontation with Mechagodzilla in Makuhari using Baby as bait, but backfires after Rodan transformed into Fire Rodan to intercepts the UNGCC transport containing Baby and Gojo after responded to Baby's call.

Later, Godzilla is soon overpowered by Mechagodzilla, now merges with Garuda to becomes Super Mechagodzilla, which paralyzing him by electrically rupturing a second brain in his hips and then mortally wounds him with a merciless barrage of energy weapons. Rodan, who was injured by Mechagodzilla, responds to Baby's call again, but Mechagodzilla shoots him down onto Godzilla. The dying Rodan sacrifices himself by transfers his power into Godzilla, which promptly regenerates and further energizes the latter's second brain, granting Godzilla a empowered variant of his atomic breath, which he uses to destroys Mechagodzilla.

Now unopposed, Godzilla locates Baby and expresses relief at finally encountering another of his kind. Despite Baby initially being afraid of Godzilla's gigantic size, Miki telepathically urges him from afar to follow Godzilla. Adopting Baby as his own, Godzilla departs with his son into the sea.

=== Godzilla vs. SpaceGodzilla (1994) ===
In 1995, Godzilla and now grown-up Baby Godzilla, known as Little Godzilla, having settles on Baas Island, a lush island in the South Pacific that Godzilla often visited due to its close proximity and similarities to his former home on Lagos Island. He raises Little there in relative peace for a year. A group of UNGCC researchers, including Miki, who warned by the Cosmos about the arrival of an extraterrestrial clone of Godzilla created from samples of his cells, which being sent off into outer space and then fusing with an crystalline entity of unknown origin called SpaceGodzilla, come to the island to try enact Project T, the placement of a telepathic amplifier on the back of Godzilla's head that can be used to control the beast and keep him away from Japan.

The operation is interrupted by the arrival of SpaceGodzilla. Intent on killing his progenitor and conquering the Earth, SpaceGodzilla initially attacks Little to lure Godzilla into a confrontation, then quickly overwhelms Godzilla with a myriad of psychic attacks. SpaceGodzilla then imprisons Little in a cage of crystals, and the enraged Godzilla, after failing to free his son, pursues SpaceGodzilla to Kyushu.

He arrives to find that SpaceGodzilla has transformed Fukuoka into a massive fortress of crystals, and his enemy locked in a battle with M.O.G.U.E.R.A, a new G-Force mecha built to replace Mechagodzilla as a part of Project M that piloted by Koji Shinjo, Kiyoshi Sato and Akira Yuki. Godzilla and M.O.G.U.E.R.A join forces in a protracted battle with SpaceGodzilla, taking dual advantage of SpaceGodzilla reliance on the crystals and Fukuoka Tower as an energy source to cripple the creature.

While M.O.G.U.E.R.A is damaged beyond repair in the battle, Godzilla ultimately destroys SpaceGodzilla by incinerating him along with the damaged now-unmanned M.O.G.U.E.R.A. with a supercharged atomic blast. With Little freed by SpaceGodzilla's destruction, Godzilla peacefully leaves Kyushu to reunite with his son after Miki uses her psychic powers to remove the mind control device from him.

=== Godzilla vs. Destoroyah (1995) ===
Godzilla, as he appears in Godzilla vs. Destoroyah.

Sometime later, in 1996, a volcanic eruption on Baas Island reveals a hidden deposit of high-purity uranium which destroys the island and further irradiates Godzilla and Little Godzilla. While Little grows into a larger, adolescent state known as Godzilla Junior by UNGCC, Godzilla's heart, analogous to a nuclear reactor, experiences abnormal nuclear destabilization from the huge influx of radiation.

He begins to undergo gradual nuclear meltdown, with his body developing glowing, lava-like rashes and leaving his atomic breath in a perpetual supercharged state. Godzilla attacks Hong Kong in a frenzied, agonized state. The UNGCC learns that his meltdown is terminal and will inevitably cause him to explode with enough force to ignite the Earth's atmosphere. Efforts are made by G-Force to stabilize Godzilla's condition using advanced freezing weapons and the modified version of the previous Super-X called Super X-III, but the situation is further escalated by the sudden appearance of Destoroyah, a species of Precambrian creatures mutated by the Oxygen Destroyer, which wreak havoc through Tokyo.

The UNGCC organizes a meeting between Godzilla and Destoroyah by once again using Junior as bait, hoping that Destoroyah will kill Godzilla before he can reach meltdown. Junior ends up defeating Destoroyah himself before Godzilla arrives, and the two reunite. The reunion is interrupted by Destoroyah, which merges into their complete form and ambushes the two at Haneda Airport. Godzilla witnesses Destoroyah kills Junior, sending him into a rage-induced warpath.

After temporarily driving Destoroyah away, Godzilla unsuccessfully attempts to revive an dying Junior, causing his grief over his only companion's death accelerates the meltdown. Destoroyah returns, but Godzilla and G-Force overwhelm and destroy them.

As Godzilla starts to meltdown, G-Force uses its freezer weapons and Super X-III to minimize the damage. The expected thermonuclear explosion is prevented, but Godzilla himself perishes as his body disintegrates, releasing his radioactive properties into Tokyo and rendering the city uninhabitable. However, Junior ends up absorbing the radiation, restoring him to life and causing him to mutate into a fully grown Godzilla, ultimately succeeding his father.

== Appearances ==
=== Films ===
- The Return of Godzilla (1984)
  - Godzilla 1985 (1985)
- Godzilla vs. Biollante (1989)
- Godzilla vs. King Ghidorah (1991)
- Godzilla vs. Mothra (1992)
- Godzilla vs. Mechagodzilla II (1993)
- Monster Planet of Godzilla (1994)
- Godzilla vs Space Godzilla (1994)
- Godzilla vs Destoroyah (1995)

=== Television ===
- Chibi Godzilla Raids Again (2024, cameo)

=== Books ===
- Definitive Edition: The Perfect Godzilla Giant Monster Super Encyclopedia (2016; only on the front cover of the book with other Godzilla specimens)
- Picturebook of Godzilla & All Monsters (2021; only on the front cover of the book with other Godzilla specimens)
- Godzilla and Toho Tokusatsu: Official Mook Vol.0 (2022; only on the back cover)
- Godzilla and Toho Tokusatsu: Official Mook Vol.15 (2023; only on the front cover with Mechagodzilla II)

=== Video games ===
- Super Godzilla
- Godzilla: Destroy All Monsters Melee (as Godzilla 90s)
- Godzilla: Save the Earth (as Godzilla 90s)
- Godzilla: Unleashed (as Godzilla 90s)
- Godzilla On Monster Island
- Monster Strike
- Godzilla (2014 video game)
- Godzilla: Kaiju Collection
- Godzilla Battle Line
- GigaBash

== Public displays ==
In 1995, a statue of the Heisei Godzilla was built and displayed at the Hibiya Godzilla Square, but in 2016, it was replaced by a 3-metre (9.8-foot; 300-centimetre; 120-inch) tall statue of Shin Godzilla. The Heisei Godzilla statue was moved inside the Toho Cinemas Hibiya building.

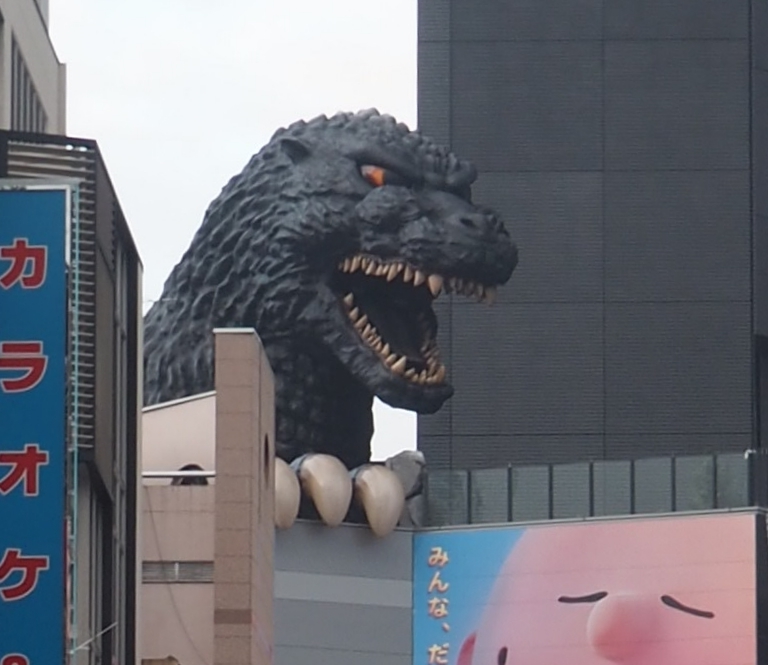
The Godzilla head on display at Shinjuku Toho Building in 2015

In 1999, a 8.75-metre (28.7-foot; 875-centimetre; 344-inch) tall Heisei Godzilla slide was built at Kurihama Flower World, though it has the outward appearance of a statue. This statue was constructed for children under the age of 12.

On December 8, 2014, an announcement was made that the Godzilla head would be constructed on the 8th floor terrace of the Hotel Gracery Shinjuku in Tokyo, Japan. The construction work of the Godzilla head was completed on April 10, 2015 and is currently located at the Shinjuku Toho Building in Kabukichō, Shinjuku.

In February 2022, Coolprops announced that they would release an official life-sized bust of the Heisei Godzilla, in collaboration with Toho.

== Stolen suit ==
A photograph of the stolen Godzilla suit after being found at Lake Okutama.

During production on Godzilla vs. Mothra in 1992, the Godzilla suit built for the previous film, Godzilla vs. King Ghidorah, went missing from Toho's warehouse. According to American news outlets, the suit was stolen by a group of unknown thieves, prompting Toho to issue a public plea for its return. An elderly Japanese woman happened upon the discarded suit while walking around Lake Okutama. After alerting Toho of its whereabouts, it was recovered and repaired in time for use in Godzilla vs. Mothra.

== See also ==
- Godzilla (Shōwa)
- Shin Godzilla (character)
- Godzilla (Takashi Yamazaki)
