= Megalon =

Kaiju from Godzilla franchise

- Godzilla character
- Megalon as featured in Godzilla vs. Megalon (1973).
- First appearance: Godzilla vs. Megalon (1973)
- Last appearance: Godzilla vs. Megalon (2023)
- Created by: Jun Fukuda; Shinichi Sekizawa
- Portrayed by: Hideto Odachi

In-universe information
- Species: Giant beetle-like deity

Megalon (メガロ, Megaro) is a giant monster, or kaiju, who first appeared in Jun Fukuda's 1973 film Godzilla vs. Megalon as the titular main antagonist. Megalon is depicted as a giant beetle-like creature capable of burrowing, flight, and shooting projectiles. Despite its major appearance in the thirteenth film in the Godzilla franchise, it remains its only feature film appearance to date. (Note: Aside from Godzilla: Final Wars (2004), in which he makes a cameo as a toy) In the film, Megalon joins forces with Gigan to fight Godzilla and Jet Jaguar.

== Overview ==
=== Design ===
Megalon is a bipedal, humanoid, burrowing insect-like entity resembling a beetle, standing 55 meters (180 feet) tall and weighing 40,000 metric tons (44,092 short tons). The creature is worshiped as the god of the subterranean Kingdom of Seatopia. Following a series of unregulated nuclear tests in the 1973 film, Megalon was sent above ground by the Seatopians to seek revenge against humanity.

Megalon has two drill-like front appendages, which it uses both for burrowing and as weapons, and it possesses a set of wings usually protected by a beetle-like shell. When flying, Megalon puts its two arms together and its outer wings open allowing two hindwings to be used for flying. When the left and right arms are combined, Megalon's arms turn into a rotating drill which grants it the ability to burrow through ground.

Megalon also has a horn similar to a Japanese rhinoceros beetle, which non-Japanese viewers found odd. Lightning-like bolts of electricity can be fired by Megalon from its horn, in a style similar to King Ghidorah's gravitational rays. Megalon generates napalm bombs in its stomach, which it spits from its mouth. Officially called Geothermal Napalm Bullets, these bombs act as timed explosives, giving other kaiju time to throw them back at Megalon. Megalon is also able to leap through the air for ten kilometers at a time, in a style similar to a grasshopper. Megalon can fly at speeds up to mach 3, burrow at mach 2, and can swim underwater at mach 4.

The suit created to portray Megalon was the second heaviest created by Toho at the time, only being outclassed by the original Godzilla suit from the 1954 film. During production of a scene featuring explosives, the suits for Megalon and Gigan caught fire and the actors had to be rescued by nearby technicians who doused the flames with water hoses.

== Appearances ==
=== Showa era (1973) ===
Megalon was originally meant to appear in the 1972 film, Godzilla vs. Gigan, but was cut out of the film by screenwriter Shinichi Sekizawa and pushed back to appear in the 1973 film, Godzilla vs. Megalon instead.

In Godzilla vs. Megalon, Megalon is worshiped as a deity by the people of the subterranean kingdom known as Seatopia. The Seatopians unleash Megalon on the surface world as revenge for the damage caused to Seatopia through reckless nuclear testing. Megalon possesses limited intelligence, so to direct him, the Seatopians send agents to steal the robot Jet Jaguar, which proceeds to lead Megalon to targets selected for destruction. After Seatopia gains control over Jet Jaguar, the robot directs Megalon to destroy much of Tokyo. When Jet Jaguar is successfully returned to the control of his creators, Seatopia makes contact with the Nebula Space Hunter Aliens, who send Gigan to assist Megalon, and the two monsters come into conflict with Godzilla and Jet Jaguar. Megalon and Gigan are ultimately defeated, and Megalon burrows back underground to return to Seatopia.

Unlike most kaiju under fire from humans who prevail with brute force, Megalon uses retreat and ambush tactics to defeat human forces in his first encounter.

=== Millennium era (2004) ===
Megalon makes a cameo in the 2004 film Godzilla: Final Wars as a toy, along with other kaiju from the Godzilla franchise.

=== Reiwa era (2017-2023) ===
Megalon returns in Godzilla: Monster Apocalypse, a prequel novel to Godzilla: Planet of the Monsters. Megalon appeared on the West coast of Africa in 2012 and crossed the continent, destroying countless nations, and disappeared into the Indian Ocean. There were 20 million casualties, including the wounded. Shortly after Megalon's attack across Africa, millions of refugees fled to Europe and the Middle East due to civil wars across the continent, this also lead to a dispute between refugees and locals in Egypt that lead to a second civil war. Megalon returned 10 years later and attacked South Africa, forcing humanity to abandon the continent.

In Godzilla: Project Mechagodzilla, a prequel novel to Godzilla: City on the Edge of Battle, 7 years later, Megalon moves to Asia. It annihilates India and Pakistan, both of whom just recovered from a nuclear war against each other. After destroying the Philippines, Megalon attacked Okinawa, but was intercepted by King Caesar, a guardian deity of the island, and both monsters died in the resulting battle.

Megalon made his return in the short film Godzilla vs. Megalon, released for Godzilla Fest 2023 to celebrate the 50th anniversary of the character. In the short, Megalon is summoned to fight Godzilla, after his victory over Gigan in the previous short, Godzilla vs. Gigan Rex.

== Other appearances ==
=== Films ===
- Godzilla vs. Megalon (1973)
- Godzilla: Final Wars (2004; toy)
- Godzilla vs. Megalon (2023, short film)

=== Television ===
- Godzilla Island (1997–1998)

=== Web content ===
- Godziban (2019-2025)

=== Literature ===
- Godzilla at World’s End (1998)
- Godzilla: The Half-Century War (comic, 2012–2013)
- Godzilla: Rulers of Earth (comic, 2013–2015)
- Godzilla: Monster Apocalypse (2017)
- Godzilla: Project Mechagodzilla (2018)

=== Video games ===
- Godzilla vs. 3 Major Monsters (MSX, 1984)
- Godzilla (Arcade, 1993)
- Kaijū-ō Godzilla (Game Boy, 1993)
- Godzilla: Battle Legends (TurboDuo, 1993)
- Godzilla: Heart-Pounding Monster Island (Sega Pico, 1995)
- Godzilla Trading Battle (PlayStation, 1998)
- Godzilla Generations (Dreamcast, 1998)
- Godzilla: Destroy All Monsters Melee (GameCube, Xbox, 2002–2003)
- Godzilla: Domination! (GBA, 2002)
- Godzilla: Save the Earth (Xbox, PS2, 2004)
- Godzilla: Unleashed (Wii, PS2, 2007)
- Godzilla Unleashed: Double Smash (Nintendo DS, 2007)
- Godzilla (PS3, PS4, 2014)
- Godzilla Defense Force (Mobile, 2019)
- Godzilla (Stern pinball machine, 2021)
- Godzilla Battle Line (2021)

== Bibliography ==
- Kalat, David (2010). A Critical History and Filmography of Toho's Godzilla Series (2nd ed.). McFarland & Company. ISBN 9780786447497.
- Lees, J.D.; Cerasini, Marc (May 1998). The Official Godzilla Compendium. Random House. ISBN 0679888225.
- Nishikawa, Shinji (2024) [2023 (Original Japanese publication)]. Godzilla: The Encyclopedia. Titan Books. ISBN 978-1835410363.
- Skipper, Graham (2022). Godzilla: The Official Guide to the King of the Monsters (in English and Japanese). Welbeck Publishing Group. ISBN 9781802790009.
