= Hedorah =

Kaiju from Godzilla franchise

- Godzilla character
- Hedorah in land form as portrayed by Kenpachiro Satsuma via suitmation in Godzilla vs. Hedorah
- First appearance: Godzilla vs. Hedorah (1971)
- Last appearance: Chibi Godzilla Raids Again (2023)
- Created by: Yoshimitsu Banno
- Portrayed by: Shōwa series Kenpachiro Satsuma; Millennium series Kazuhiro Yoshida

In-universe information
- Alias: The Smog Monster
- Species: Pollutant Monster
- Forms: Aquatic form Land form Flying form Final form

Hedorah (ヘドラ, Hedora), also known as the Smog Monster, is a giant monster, or kaiju, who first appeared in Toho's 1971 film Godzilla vs. Hedorah. Hedorah was named for Hedoro (へどろ), the Japanese word for sludge, slime, vomit or chemical ooze.

== Overview ==
=== Development ===
Whereas Godzilla was a symbol of Japanese concerns over nuclear weapons, Hedorah was envisioned as an embodiment of Yokkaichi asthma, caused by Japan's widespread smog and urban pollution at the time. Director Yoshimitsu Banno stated in an interview that his intention in creating Hedorah was to give Godzilla an adversary who was more than just a "giant lobster" and which represented "the most notorious thing in current society". He also stated that Hedorah's vertically tilted eyes were based on vaginas, which he joked were "scary". The monster was originally going to be named "Hedoron", though this changed once the TV series Spectreman introduced a character with an identical name.

The monster was realized via various props and a large sponge rubber suit donned by future Godzilla performer Kenpachiro Satsuma in his first acting role for Toho. Satsuma had been selected on account of his physical fitness, though he stated later that he had been disappointed to receive the role, as he had grown tired of taking non-speaking roles. In performing as Hedorah, Satsuma tried to emphasize Hedorah's otherworldly nature by making its movements seem more grotesque than animal-like. Several authors have noted that, unlike most Toho monsters, Hedorah's violent acts are graphically shown to claim human victims, and the creature shows genuine amusement at Godzilla's suffering. Banno wished to bring back Hedorah in a sequel set in Africa, but the project never materialized, as he was fired by producer and series co-creator Tomoyuki Tanaka, who allegedly accused him of ruining the Godzilla series. Complex listed the character as #8 on its "The 15 Most Badass Kaiju Monsters of All Time" list.

Banno had hoped to revisit Hedorah in his unrealized project Godzilla 3-D, which would have had featured a similar monster named Deathla. Like its predecessor, Deathla would have been a shape-shifting extraterrestrial, though it would have fed on chlorophyll rather than gas emissions, and all of its forms would have incorporated a skull motif.

=== Shōwa era (1971) ===
In Godzilla vs. Hedorah, Hedorah originates from the Dark Gas Nebula in the constellation of Orion. It journeys to Earth via a passing comet, and lands in Suruga Bay as a monstrous tadpole-like creature, increasing in size as it feeds on the pollutants contaminating the water. It proceeds to rampage throughout Japan, killing thousands and feeding on gas emissions and toxic waste, gradually gaining power as it advances from a water stage, to a land stage, and finally a bipedal Perfect Form that it can switch out for a smaller, flying form at any time. Godzilla confronts Hedorah at Mount Fuji, but his atomic breath has no effect on Hedorah's amorphous, water-rich body. Hedorah rapidly overpowers Godzilla using a combination of its fearsome strength and incredible durability, and almost kills the King of the Monsters after hurling him into a pit and attempting to drown him under a deluge of chemical ooze. It is later discovered that Hedorah is vulnerable to temperatures high enough to dehydrate it, so the JSDF constructs a pair of gigantic electrodes on the battlefield to use against the alien. Hedorah and Godzilla continue to fight, and the former is subsequently killed when Godzilla uses his atomic breath to power the electrodes, which cripple Hedorah and allow Godzilla to fully dehydrate its body into dust.

=== Millennium era (2004) ===
Hedorah briefly reappears in Godzilla: Final Wars as one of several monsters under the Xiliens' control before it is destroyed by Godzilla alongside Ebirah in Tokyo.

=== Other ===
Hedorah also appears in Godzilla: Planet of the Monsters's prequel novel Godzilla: Monster Apocalypse, in which it was originally a colony of sludge-like microorganisms that lived off dissolved chemicals inside a mine in Hebei, China. After the Chinese government discovered it in 1999, they studied and modified the microorganisms to operate as a giant, mist-like bioweapon with red and yellow eyes called Hedorah. In 2005, the Chinese military commenced "Operation: Hedorah" to kill Anguirus and Rodan with the bio-weapon. Hedorah successfully took down the two monsters, but it achieved sentience afterwards and went on a rampage, consumed the pollutants in the surrounding area, then disappeared, leaving an estimated 8.2 million casualties in its wake.

The 2021 short film "Godzilla vs. Hedorah", created for the 50th Anniversary of the character, features the Final Wars incarnations of Hedorah and Godzilla in a rematch amid an oil refinery in the daytime.

The webseries Godziban features a wise elderly Hedorah and his grandson known as Grandpa Hedo and Young Hedo. They initially had their own end segment where Grandpa Hedo shared his wisdom with his grandchild before being shifted to a Greek chorus role in the main series.

Hedorah also appears as a recurring character in Chibi Godzilla Raids Again. In this animated series, Hedorah is depicted as male, and serves as a teacher to the other monsters, describing himself as a self-professed 'sage'. He also ironically has a particular interest in protecting the environment.

== Appearances ==
=== Films ===
- Godzilla vs. Hedorah (1971)
- Godzilla: Final Wars (2004)
- Godzilla: Planet of the Monsters (2017)
- Godzilla vs. Hedorah (2021, short film)

=== Television ===
- Godzilla Island (1997-1998)
- Godziban (2019–present)
- Chibi Godzilla Raids Again (2023-2024)

=== Video games ===
- Godzilla: Monster of Monsters! (NES - 1988)
- Godzilla / Godzilla-Kun: Kaijuu Daikessen (Game Boy - 1990)
- Godzilla 2: War of the Monsters (NES - 1991)
- Kaijū-ō Godzilla / King of the Monsters, Godzilla (Game Boy - 1993)
- Godzilla: Battle Legends (Turbo Duo - 1993)
- Godzilla Trading Battle (PlayStation - 1998)
- Godzilla: Destroy All Monsters Melee (GCN, Xbox - 2002/2003)
- Godzilla Unleashed: Double Smash (NDS - 2007)
- Godzilla: The Game (PS3 - 2014 PS3 PS4 - 2015)
- Godzilla Defense Force (2019)
- Godzilla Battle Line (2021)
- GigaBash (PS4, PS5, Steam, Epic Games - 2024)

=== Literature ===
- Godzilla vs. Gigan and the Smog Monster (1996)
- Godzilla at World’s End (1998)
- Godzilla: Monster Apocalypse (2017)

=== Comics ===
- Godzilla: Legends (comic - 2011–2012)
- Godzilla: Ongoing (comic - 2012)
- Godzilla: The Half-Century War (comic - 2012–2013)
- Godzilla: Rulers of Earth (comic - 2013–2015)
- Godzilla Rivals (comic - 2021)
- Godzilla vs. Hulk (comic - 2025)

=== Music ===
- Hedorah appears on the album cover of Frank Zappa's Sleep Dirt.
- Hedorah appears on the album cover of Dinosaur Jr's Sweep It Into Space.

== Bibliography ==
- Rhoads & McCorkle, Sean & Brooke (2018). Japan's Green Monsters: Environmental Commentary in Kaiju Cinema. McFarland. ISBN 9781476663906.
