= Santa Cruz Games =

American video game developer

- Company type: Independent
- Industry: Video games
- Founded: 2001; 25 years ago
- Defunct: 2010; 16 years ago
- Headquarters: Santa Cruz, California, US
- Area served: Worldwide

Santa Cruz Games was an American independent video game developer founded in 2001 in Santa Cruz, California, USA.

== Published games ==
- 2008: The Amazing Spider-Man and the Masked Menace for Jakks Pacific (Plug It In And Play TV Game)
- 2008: Tomb Raider: Underworld for Nintendo DS
- 2008: Igor: The Game for Wii, PC
- 2007: Godzilla Unleashed: Double Smash for DS
- 2006: Superman Returns for DS, GBA (Electronic Arts)
- 2005: Madagascar Island Mania for Microsoft Windows
- 2005: Fantastic 4 for Jakks Pacific (Plug It In And Play TV Game)
- 2004: Spider-Man for Jakks Pacific (Plug It In And Play TV Game)
- 2004: Shark Tale for Windows
- 2003: 101 Dalmatians II: Patch's London Adventure for PS1
- 2003: Dora the Explorer: Barnyard Buddies for PS1
- 2002: Shaun Murray's Pro WakeBoarder for GameCube
- 2001: E.T.: Interplanetary Mission for PS1

=== Canceled/Unreleased Games ===
- A sequel to HBO Boxing (PlayStation 2)
- How I Spent My Summer Vacation (Nintendo DS, Windows)
- Pickles (GameCube, Xbox)
- a Scorpion King game
- SpongeBob SquarePants and the Nicktoons: Gravjet Racing (Xbox 360)
