= GigaBash =

- Developer: Passion Republic Games
- Publisher: Passion Republic Games
- Directors: Mel Law, Aiken Tow
- Producer: Ng Aik Sern
- Writer: Gerald Yong
- Engine: Unreal Engine 4
- Platforms: Microsoft Windows; PlayStation 4; PlayStation 5; Nintendo Switch; Xbox One; Xbox Series X/S
- Release: Windows, PS4, PS5; August 5, 2022; Switch, Xbox One, Series X/S; August 4, 2023
- Genre: Brawler
- Modes: Single-player, multiplayer

GigaBash is a brawler game developed and published by Malaysian independent studio Passion Republic Games. It was released for Microsoft Windows, PlayStation 4 and PlayStation 5 on August 5, 2022. It was also released for Nintendo Switch, Xbox One and Xbox Series X/S on August 4, 2023. The video game centers on battles themed around the kaiju genre, and features crossover collaborations with characters from the franchises of Godzilla, Ultraman, and Gamera.

== Gameplay ==
=== Controls and Mechanics ===
GigaBash is a brawler in which players assumes control of "titans" (giant kaiju, mechas, and aliens of various forms) to battle each other in stages filled with destructible environments, some of which involve hazards or otherwise disruptive (or helpful) elements like lava, flash floods with debris, spiked walls, avalanches, pitfalls, freezing water, non-playable enemy units, sandstorms, harmful intermittent energy pulses, massive collapsible buildings, explosive tanks, rideable missiles, or temporary boosts that can aid any of the combatants.

Each monster has a basic (light) and special (heavy) attack, which can be repeated, prolonged, or charged by tapping or holding down the associated button. Each titan is also capable of grabbing (with the grabbed object or enemy being thrown if the grab button is pressed again). All basic attacks (and some special attacks) change when done in the air or with a grab, while grabbing an enemy in the air results in a unique move that gains more points than even a triple combo. Combatants grabbing each other at the same time must mash the attack button in order to successfully grab their opponent, with a stalemate resulting in both combatants simply pushing each other away harmlessly. Certain combatants with beam attacks can also engage in a "beam clash", which involves mashing the special attack button to push the collision point between two beams towards the enemy before an explosion occurs and damages those closest to the collision point.

The monsters also have the ability to block (which can be disrupted by enough attacks, grabs, grab-based attacks, and explosions) and dash (backward when stationary, influenced by the direction the player is going in if mobile). Blocking can be done at the same time as a basic move (usually resulting in a parry, counter, deflective barrier, or omnidirectional attack) or a special move (which triggers an anti-air attack like an uppercut or an upward shot), and the dash can be combined with the basic attack for a forward dash attack, or can be done in the air for a quick, non-dashing dodge. Some of the characters have special gimmicks unique to them. Certain attacks, objects, and environmental hazards can also inflict status effects (most - but not all - of which bypass blocking) like burning (does damage over time), poisoning (slows and damages over time), restraining, freezing, dizziness, impalement, and electrocution (paralysis, with the last of the five sometimes erratically disrupting movement for a few seconds afterward), bleeding (does damage every time the inflicted character moves), and confusion (reverses controls).

The game revolves around Giga-energy, which may be found as orbs in certain places within some stages. However, Giga-energy is usually gained every time a kaiju damages their opponent (with some special moves gaining more by sacrificing health, knocking the enemy's Giga-energy out of them, or outright absorbing the enemy's Giga-energy). Once full of Giga-energy (as indicated by a pink meter), kaiju can transform into their significantly stronger and larger "S-class" state. This form is temporary, with the Giga-energy meter slowly depleting over time, but, although Giga-energy found in the environment cannot refill the meter while the monster is in its S-class state, the kaiju can fill their meter back up by doing combos or absorbing the enemy's Giga-energy with certain attacks. When a match goes on for long enough, a destructible bubble-like "Giga-ball" will start floating around the stage, which would allow any kaiju that shatters it to unleash an ultimate attack that deals devastating damage to other opponents. Titans can also steal the ultimate move ability from the enemy that currently has it by attacking them enough times before they can unleash it.

=== Modes ===
The game comes with four story modes where the player controls one of the four playable monsters. On March 26, 2026, a fifth story mode was added via DLC.

- The first story mode, "The Legend of Luana Island", is about the volcanic ape Gorogong of Luana Island (a place named after the princess who sacrificed herself to seal him in the island's volcano). Awakened and driven berserk following the thievery of his crystalline artifact (implied to be the spirit of Princess Luana herself), he eventually took over Tarabak Island (the game's equivalent of Skull Island) after defeating the monsters Skorak, Rohanna, and Rawa, uniting all of their respective cults under him in the process.
- The second story, "Project P.P.J.U.R.A.S", is about the alien invader Pipijuras. Codenamed "P.P.J.U.R.A.S." by the Global Titan Defense Initiative (GTDI), it was previously contained in Area 51 and given cybernetic upgrades to serve as an anti-kaiju weapon. After its mind control implant was destroyed in a battle with Gorogong, it fought Earth's forces to retrieve the parts of its stolen teleporter, which it then implanted in the Earth's core after defeating its guardian, Zyva, destructively teleporting the entire planet to its race.
- The third story is about "Woolley's Misadventures". Due to a distraction, the story's main character sets out from his home, Siberia's Yeti Sanctuary, and goes on a journey across the world, meeting enemies (who he interpreted as others wanting to play with him) and others of his kind in the process, resulting in his family greatly expanding by the end of his adventure.
- The fourth story, "The Knight in Lighting Armor", is about Thundatross, an electrical mecha developed by OtomaTEC and piloted by a young boy, teenage prodigy Yuuki Otoma. Following the abduction of his father Kazuo at the hands of OtomaTEC defector Dr. Reiner, Yuuki, with the aid of his mentor Gigaman, ended up facing "Unit 02", a newer version of Thundatross created and piloted by Dr. Reiner (who aims to absorb the power of Earth's Giga Core, which will lead to the destruction of all titans and the Earth as a whole), with Yuuki's father strapped in to bypass the security features that prevent the mecha's technology from being used by anyone not related to the Otomas. After saving Dr. Otoma and the fate of Earth (with Dr. Reiner stuck in his destroyed mech and abandoned deep in the Earth's core), Thundatross is accepted as a hero of humanity.
- The fifth story, "A Legend Reborn", is about Gigaman, an Ultraman-like figure formed by the bond between the human Sho and the ancient cosmic being known as gaya Gaya. After 32 years of defending Japan, the veteran hero retired after his failure to save Tokyo from Rawa's self-destruction in 2012. Resolving to return to heroism in 2020, Gigaman, alongside new heroes, the mechas Thundatross and R.O.J.A.K. (Robot of Justice Against Kaiju), fought to put a stop to the mass kaiju rampage known as Ascension in 2021, an event caused by the newly revived Rawa, capitalized on by the space manticore Balzarr. When Rawa and Balzarr combined in their original form, Zargorah, Gigaman and Sho, strengthening their bond to bring forth "Gaya Gigaman", sacrificed themselves to bring down their primordial nemesis, thus saving the world.

The game also has an arcade mode, where the player runs through a gauntlet of the game's nine original titan (excluding the player's monster) at launch, as well as both local and online multiplayer. In Onslaught mode, one or two players can fight through 50 waves of enemies (Classic), or 30 waves of enemies with powerful abilities (Mutants). In battle mode, players can engage in free-for-all battle, or split into 2 - 3 teams and combat each other. While the game supports up to four players, solo players can also compete against characters controlled by artificial intelligence. Furthermore, the game features "Mayhem mode", a party mode in which players can complete various minigames together.

The game's ten original monsters can be leveled up to 20 the more they are played. Leveling up unlocks a monster's skins and lore documents. The game's DLC characters have all their alternate skins and lore unlocked.

== Characters ==
The game launched with ten original monsters. As of July 2026, the roster now also features DLC fighters, among them, six kaiju from the Godzilla franchise, seven characters from the Ultraman franchise (with the fifth fighter being assisted in battle by a juvenile kaiju), two kaiju from Gamera Rebirth, and five original characters. bringing the roster up to a total of 30 monsters.

=== Original Characters ===
==== Base Roster ====
- Gorogong, the "Mad Beast": A magma-infused, horned gorilla-like monster from Luana Island, based on King Kong as well as the Ultraman kaiju Bemular and Garamon.
- Pipijuras, "Specimen 51": A three-eyed alien invader. Based on several Ultraman aliens, including Metron, Temperor, and Baltan, with the last of the three eventually ending up as a guest fighter in the game.
- Thundatross, the "Knight in Lightning Armor": A giant mecha based on DyGenGuar, piloted by teenage prodigy Yuuki Otoma, son of Dr. Kazuo Otoma and his late wife Megumi Otoma, powered by Giga Energy and equipped with an enormous electric sword that can summon lightning from above.
- Woolley: A member of a global species of Yeti known for their agility, sucking ability, hyper-elastic bellies, and playful nature, appearing to be a cross between Totoro and Kirby. Although referred to as male in-game, Ng Aik Sern, the game's founder, implies that Woolley may also be considered female.
- Skorak, the "Great Devourer": A predatory, toxic slug that uses Rawa's previous skull as an explosive snail shell after having poisoned and devoured the dragon from inside due to cult defectors, earning him titles like "Tyrant Slayer", and "Nightmare of Tarabak Island". Skorak's home, Tarabak, is named after the Taraban snail kaiju from Ultraman Tiga, while the monster's name is based on "skull" and its Malay equivalent, "tengkorak".
- Gigaman, the "Symbol of Hope": A giant, slightly out-of-shape (but still very potent) Ultraman-esque veteran superhero, formed by the bond between a man named Sho and an ancient Garuda-like entity named Gaya. Having recently emerged from abrupt retirement, he serves as a mentor for the pilot of Thundatross (as he is implied to have worked with Yuuki's father in the past).
- Rohanna, the "Ancient Monarch of Tarabak": A giant nature goddess based on the Sang Kelembai, tigers, and the bunga raya flower, intended to represent of Malaysia as a whole. Her name, based on "Roh" (Malay for "Spirit") and "hana" (Japanese for flower), coincidentally matches the name of one of the game's project managers (since Rohana, spelled with a single "n", is a common name in Malaysia).
- Rawa, the "Extinction Dragon": A powerful saurian monster based on both the Phaya Naga and Godzilla, wielding ethereal flames that outright disintegrates molecules without a trace of heat. Once a serpentine ruler reigning supreme over Tarabak Island, he was revived as an undead entity in a weakened (but still powerful) state by his cult following his death due to Skorak.
- Zyva (fully known as "Ghamidzyva"): A race of telekinetic, shapeshifting, faceless crystalline sentinels that fiercely guard the Hollow Earth from all who enter it regardless of their intentions, sometimes entering the surface world to immediately deal with any attempts against the Earth's core, or even attack other creatures simply for being too close to a Hollow Earth entrance.
- Kongkrete: An enigmatic human actor that was accidentally merged with a building by the beam of Gigaman, who he idolized and was set to portray in a film, now existing as a living building that shows up wherever Giga Energy is most concentrated, being constantly spotted watching Gigaman from a distance.

==== MechaJURAS Free DLC ====
- MechaJURAS, the "Future of Liberty": A massive, anti-titan mecha originally made by the GTDI based on Pipijuras, it has since been improved and mass-produced to be sold to countries worldwide.

==== Mighty DLC Pack ====
- R.O.J.A.K. (Robot of Justice Against Kaiju), the last "Super Aegis": A Megazord-like mecha composed of the survivors of "Aegis" teams that were destroyed by Balzarr. Named after a salad given their different backgrounds, themes, and behavior. The five members include "Kabuto" (rookie pilot Eji Yōsuke), the red stag beetle from Japan, "Tian Long" (ace pilot Zhou Yang), the yellow dragon from China, "Crown" (an anonymous hacker girl going by the same codename), the green durian from Malaysia, "Rex" (bodybuilder Jack Kavana), the blue T. rex from the fictional Polynesian Kahu'a Republic, and "Liberty Prime" (Sergeant Sam Williams), the black tank from the US.
- Balzarr, the "Demon Star": A space manticore that arrived in a meteorite to consume the Earth's Giga Energy, inspired by the Power Rangers villain Goldar.

==== Final Ascension DLC ====
- Gaya Gigaman, the "Champion of Justice": A more powerful form of Gigaman attained by a strengthened bond with Sho's host Gaya. One of only two "Apex Titans" alongside Zargorah.
- Zargorah, the "Devourer of Stars": The original, combined form of Rawa and Balzarr. A primordial, serpentine Apex Titan known as the "Cosmic Chaos", nemesis of Gaya and source of almost all the Giga Energy in the world, including Earth's Giga Core.

=== Godzilla ===
==== 4 Kaiju DLC Pack ====
- Gigan (Showa): An agile and highly advanced, violent, cycloptic cyborg "space dinosaur" with scythe arms, a chest buzzsaw, and shotgun-like "Gigarium Cluster" beam. He is sent by M Space Hunter Nebula Aliens for the purpose of planetary invasion, and is considered to be one of Godzilla's most brutal adversaries.
- Godzilla (Heisei), the "King of the Monsters": A formidable dinosaur from Lagos Island mutated and empowered by nuclear energy, one of the most famous kaiju known. Based on his Heisei incarnation, albeit with attacks and taunts that reference his iconic moments from other films and versions of him.
- Mechagodzilla, Multipurpose Fighting System Type-3 "Kiryu": A mecha with a vast array of powerful weapons (railguns, plasma blades, missiles, maser beams, and an Absolute Zero Cannon) and other equipment (thrusters that allow for quick movement and flight), built using the bones of the original Godzilla, the vengeful spirit of which sometimes possesses the machine.
- Destoroyah, the "Perfect Lifeform": A colony of microscopic Precambrian crustaceans mutated by the "Oxygen Destroyer" superweapon that defeated the original Godzilla, combined in the form of a single demonic, sadistic creature.

==== 2 Nemesis DLC Pack ====
- King Ghidorah (Heisei), "Monster Zero": Godzilla's archenemy, a malevolent three-headed dragon with golden scales, great wings, and immense power over lightning as manifested in his signature "gravity beams" and electromagnetic pulses. As with Godzilla, although based on his Heisei version, he also references the iconic attacks, actions, and traits of his other incarnations, most notably his origin as a planet-destroying alien.
- Hedorah (Showa), the "Smog Monster": A massive heap of toxic mud composed of extremely corrosive, pollution-eating extraterrestrial mineral microorganisms. With his acidic sludge, sulfuric fumes, and "Hedrium Rays", he poses a danger to the environment and all living things within his vicinity.

=== Ultraman ===
==== 4 Characters DLC Pack ====
- Ultraman, the "Monster Disposal Specialist": An iconic, 20,000 year-old kaiju-fighting giant hero hailing from the Land of Light in Nebula M78. Though mostly based on his original version, at least one of his attacks references his Shin Ultraman counterpart.
- Alien Baltan (Generation I), the "Space Ninja": One of Ultraman's most persistent enemies, a race of advanced arthropod-like extraterrestrial invaders with the ability to teleport and self-duplicate.
- Ultraman Tiga: A "Giant of Darkness" that returned to being good, he stole the powers of his former allies and thus became the first Ultra in the franchise with multiple forms, in his case, Multi (balanced), Power, Sky (speed), and Glitter (ultimate form).
- Camearra, the "Love-Hate Warrior": Leader of the Dark Giants, armed with the power of darkness, control over swarms of Shibito-Zoiger kaiju, and ice whips that can turn into swords. She is the former lover of Ultraman Tiga, intent on corrupting him and returning him to the side of evil.

==== Ultraman: Rising DLC ====
- Ultraman & Emi: The heroic alter-ego of baseball superstar Kenji "Ken" Sato, assisted in battle by his adopted daughter Emi, offspring of the draconian kaiju Gigantron.

==== Ultraman Zero DLC ====
- Ultraman Zero, "Son of Seven": One of the most popular of the Ultra warriors, a member of the Inter Galactic Defense Force, and head of his own squad, the "Ultimate Force Zero". Despite his young age of 5,900 years, he is a powerful warrior who heroically defends the greater multiverse with his myriad of abilities.
- Ultraman Belial, the "Galactic Emperor": The archenemy of Ultraman Zero, albeit not so different from him in his younger days. Further corrupted and fused with Alien Reiblood, the fallen, 160,000 year-old Ultra Warrior schemes to conquer the universe with his Giga Battlenizer, his army of allied monsters and aliens, and dark power as a Reionics.

=== Gamera ===
==== Gamera Rebirth DLC ====
- Gamera, the "Last Hope": A giant turtle with fiery powers, quick flight, and a razor-edged shell, he is one of several monsters created by an ancient civilization to eradicate most of humanity, but instead turned against his mission and the other bioengineered kaiju to protect mankind.
- Guiron: Gamera's most brutal foe in Rebirth, a lean, quadrupedal beast with an enormous blade-shaped head, sharp scales shot electromagnetically from his armored back, an elastic torso, and remarkable agility. He is one of the many monsters made in ancient times to cleanse the human population, and is formed using the same template as Gamera himself.

== Development ==
GigaBash is the debut title for Malaysian independent game development studio Passion Republic Games. The monsters in the game were inspired by classic tokusatsu characters including Godzilla, the Dino Megazord, and Ultraman. Video games, such as games based on the WWE license, King of the Monsters, Rampage, Gundam Versus, War of the Monsters and Power Stone also influenced the team. Party games, such as Overcooked and Rocket League were also major sources of inspiration. The team also included a story mode, which serves as an "extension" to the core battle mode. This mode will explore the background of four different monsters and their origin. The game's control scheme was designed to be accessible and simple, though the player's attack will be modified by other contextual factors, such as if the player is blocking, dashing or grabbing. Each playable character in the game went through multiple phases of design and development. Thundatross, the game's first publicly revealed character, was described as an "all-rounded" monster that resembles other classic kaiju. The first teaser trailer for the game premiered on September 12, 2019. The game was released on August 5, 2022, for PlayStation 4, PlayStation 5, and Windows.

During the 2022 Tokyo Game Show, it was announced that Godzilla would join the roster as a guest character. A teaser for Godzilla's appearance in the game was released on November 2, along with three mystery fighters, all of which were foreshadowed in trailers released on November 16, 23, and 30. The DLC was released on December 6, with the three other fighters revealed to be Gigan, Mechagodzilla (Kiryu), and Destoroyah. In a Japanese Indie World Showcase on April 19, 2023, the game's Nintendo Switch port was announced for August 4, 2023, and was made available for pre-order that same day.

On October 12, a collaboration with the Ultraman series was announced. Ultraman himself was teased on that same day, with additional teasers for three other characters released on October 19, October 26, and November 2. The DLC, containing Alien Baltan, Ultraman Tiga, and Camearra, was released on November 8. However, due to regional restrictions and licensing agreements, the DLC is unavailable in mainland China. It was originally also unavailable in Japan due to the same reasons, up until it was finally released for Japan on February 9, 2026. Along with this DLC came a patch that adds the ability for combatants with beam attacks to engage in "beam clashes".

A second batch of Godzilla DLC fighters, titled the Nemesis pack, was announced on April 25, 2024. Similar to the first two DLCs, trailers were released on May 2 and 9 to foreshadow its guest fighters. The DLC was released on May 16, 2024, adding King Ghidorah and Hedorah to the roster.

On August 27, 2024, the Mighty DLC Pack, which consists of original DLC characters inspired by the Super Sentai/Power Rangers franchise, was announced. The two fighters, the invading space manticore Balzarr and the combining mecha R.O.J.A.K., were released on September 5.

On October 20, 2024, during New York Comic-Con 2024, an Ultraman: Rising collaboration DLC was announced. Unlike previous DLCs, it introduces only a single character to the roster, the film's titular character (though he is also assisted in battle by the juvenile kaiju Emi). Released on November 28, it is not available in China like the first Ultraman DLC due to regional restrictions and licensing agreements.

On May 22, 2025, MechaJURAS, previously a gimmick in one stage, was announced as a playable character, released on May 29.

On October 16 and 23, 2025, two trailers were released to tease an unnamed DLC. On October 30, this was officially revealed to be a Gamera Rebirth collaboration, with a trailer released on November 13 confirming that the other monster in the DLC is Guiron. The DLC was released on November 20.

On February 26, 2026, an upcoming mobile version of the game was announced. On March 6 and 13, 2026, two teasers were released for the game's eighth DLC, revealed to be known as the "Final Ascension" on March 20. The DLC was released in March 2026, introducing Gaya Gigaman and Zargorah, two new arenas, and a story mode for Gigaman.

On June 6, 2026, the ninth DLC, set for a July 9th release, was announced to be another Ultraman pack featuring Ultraman Zero and his nemesis, Ultraman Belial.

== Reception ==
Reception

Aggregate scores
Aggregator	Score
Metacritic	PS5: 73/100
OpenCritic	50% recommend

Review scores
Publication	Score
Destructoid	7.5/10
IGN	7/10
Push Square	7/10
Shacknews	7/10

GigaBash received "mixed or average" reviews upon release, according to review aggregator Metacritic. Fellow review aggregator OpenCritic assessed that the game received fair approval, being recommended by 50% of critics. Mitchell Saltzman of IGN gave the a game an 7/10 rating, praising the game's simple controls, character movesets and gimmick-filled stages; he concluded that these characteristics made more suited for casual local play than solo or even online play, modes he deemed "at least present and serviceable".
