= E.T.: Interplanetary Mission =

2001 video game

- North American cover art
- Developer: Santa Cruz Games
- Publishers: NA: NewKidCo; EU: Ubi Soft
- Platforms: PlayStation, Microsoft Windows
- Release: NA: December 4, 2001
- Genres: Puzzle, action, platformer
- Mode: Single-player

E.T.: Interplanetary Mission (known as E.T. the Extra-Terrestrial: The 20th Anniversary in Europe) is a 2001 action platformer video game developed by Santa Cruz Games, released by NewKidCo and Ubi Soft, and based on the film E.T. the Extra-Terrestrial. The game's story, which follows the end of the movie, centers around the titular character traveling to various planets, including Earth, in order to collect rare plants to save the universe.

E.T.: Interplanetary Mission was met with mixed reviews upon release. Critics deemed the game an improvement over the previous E.T. game, but criticized its simplicity, controls, and graphics. In 2025, an Easter egg insulting Al Qaeda founder Osama bin Laden was found at the end of the credits.

== Plot and gameplay ==
The game's story takes place after E.T.: The Extra Terrestrial, in which Elliott helped E.T. get home from Earth, but the alien embarks on a mission to gather more knowledge for his people in the form of exotic plants, which could affect the fate of the universe.

E.T. shooting a stunning projectile from his chest

The player takes control of E.T. in an isometric environment. The goal of each level is to collect plants and guide E.T. to the exit. While E.T. is slower than most enemies in the game, he is able to heal using his glowing finger, stun enemies using his stomach, and lift or throw enemies using telekinesis. If E.T. takes enough damage, he will lose a life, requiring the player to start a new game or continue with a new life.

E.T.: Interplanetary Mission has fifteen levels divided among five worlds, including Earth. The game also features puzzle elements, such as blocked areas that can only be accessed by collecting keys and touching switches, platforming elements, and three levels of difficulty.

== Development and release ==
E.T.: Interplanetary Mission was developed by Santa Cruz Games as one of multiple games released in time for the movie's 20th anniversary in 2002. In 2000, prior to the game's development, NewKidCo founder Hank Kaplan wanted to secure the rights to E.T. in order to create movie-based children's video games, but due to the film's age and the backlash of the 1982 Atari game of the same name, Kaplan's decision was met with a mixed response. NewKidCo and Ubi Soft acquired the license to the movie from Universal Pictures and Amblin Entertainment; the partnership was extended in 2001, but NewKidCo ran into financial hardships caused by the large number of licensed E.T. games it had released in the early 2000s, which included Interplanetary Mission. E.T.: Interplanetary Mission was released in North America on December 4, 2001, for the PlayStation.

== Reception ==
Reception

Aggregate score
Aggregator	Score
Metacritic	50/100

Review scores
Publication	Score
GameZone	7.2/10
PlayStation Official Magazine – UK	4/10
Official U.S. PlayStation Magazine	0.5/5

E.T.: Interplanetary Mission received "mixed or average" reviews from critics according to Metacritic. Kendall Lacey of TotalGames.net described the game as "a lot better than anyone dared to imagine", making reference to the 1982 Atari game, but said that the game was not as good as the movie it was based on. Michael Lafferty of GameZone called it an easy game with "delightful" and "charming" animations. Gary Steinman of Official U.S. PlayStation Magazine was more critical, commenting that the game is "dreadfully ugly and unredeemingly unfun". Mac Fank of Official PlayStation Russia, who noticed that the game lacked any background music, criticized the game's limited selection of sound effects, and Marcellus of Neo Plus, a Polish gaming magazine, said that the controls were the game's biggest flaw.

== Easter egg ==
In 2025, researchers discovered a hidden message at the end of the game's credits, which required a cheat code to view. The credits list the individuals who worked on the game, some of whom are listed with humorous nicknames, and at the end of the credits the message "Fuck Off Bin Laden" is shown – a reference to Al Qaeda founder Osama bin Laden in keeping with popular political discourse immediately after the September 11 attacks. The Easter egg was seen in an Angry Video Game Nerd episode about the game; afterwards, ESRB did not change the game's rating.
