= Anguirus =

Kaiju from Godzilla franchise

- Godzilla character
- Anguirus as portrayed by Hiroshi Sekita in Destroy All Monsters (1968)
- First appearance: Godzilla Raids Again (1955)
- Created by: Motoyoshi Oda
- Portrayed by: Shōwa series: Katsumi Tezuka; Hiroshi Sekita; Koetsu Omiya; Tadaaki Watanabe; Kin'ichi Kusumi; Millennium series: Toshihiro Ogura
- Voiced by: Shōwa series: Michael Kaye

In-universe information
- Alias: Angilas
- Species: Ankylosaur Kaiju

Anguirus (Japanese: アンギラス, Hepburn: Angirasu) is a kaiju created by Motoyoshi Oda who first appeared in the 1955 film Godzilla Raids Again, the second film in the Godzilla franchise produced and distributed by Toho. He is a dinosaurian monster resembling an Ankylosaurus, with Ceratosaurus and Styracosaurus traits.

Anguirus serves as the first monster to be shown engaging in combat with Godzilla in a film, and since his debut, the character has appeared conversely as an enemy and an ally of Godzilla in numerous films produced by Toho, including Destroy All Monsters (1968), Godzilla vs. Gigan (1972), Godzilla vs. Megalon (1973), Godzilla vs. Mechagodzilla (1974), and Godzilla: Final Wars (2004). He has also appeared in other media, including comic books, video games and television series.

== Overview ==
=== Appearance ===
Anguirus is a quadrupedal giant or irradiated dinosaur that mostly resembles an ankylosaurus. His head resembles a cross between that of a ceratosaurus and a styracosaurus. He has several horns on the top of his head and a single horn above his nose. His face is long and drawn out, has rows of long, serrated teeth and has two tusks on his upper jaw. His carapace is studded with long, sharp spikes. Anguirus' tail is covered with spikes (he also had a tail club in Godzilla: Final Wars). His tail makes up most of his body length. His hind limbs are longer than his forelimbs, and he can stand up on them to his full height, though he generally walks upon all fours. Anguirus has not one but five brains, one in his head which controls all of his organs, and one above each one of his limbs; each brain most likely controls the limb it is above. This gives Anguirus an advantage in battle, for he can react much quicker than most kaiju. Anguirus first appears in the Showa continuity as brown with yellowish spines, these colors are later changed in the Millennium series to light gray, with orange spikes and horns.

=== Powers and abilities ===
In his first appearance in Godzilla Raids Again, it is explained that Anguirus is capable of moving incredibly fast in spite of his bulk due to his brain extending into his chest and abdominal areas, allowing him to react more quickly. He is able to lunge at his opponents with massive leaps, as seen in Godzilla vs. Mechagodzilla, and is also capable of burrowing substantial distances. His long, burrowing journey started in Godzilla vs. Megalon and ended in Godzilla vs. Mechagodzilla, in which he resurfaces underneath Mechagodzilla and battles until his jaw is broken by the robot. Two of his attacks involve jumping backward to impale his opponents on his spiked carapace in Godzilla vs. Gigan and his vice-like bite; the most famous example of the latter being when he faced King Ghidorah in Destroy All Monsters and latched onto one of King Ghidorah's necks, his grip holding firm even after the space monster took flight. Anguirus also has the ability to heal and regenerate in a few minutes, as executives said he recovered almost immediately after Mechagodzilla broke his jaw. Anguirus has incredible durability, surviving being stomped on, being kicked with immense robotic force, being dropped from high altitudes, and surviving Godzilla's atomic ray.

In Godzilla: Final Wars, Anguirus had the ability to curl himself into a ball and propel himself forward with tremendous speed. The Final Wars version also possessed a spiked tail club like a real ankylosaurus, though it was not used in combat. He also had spikes on his legs.

Within Godzilla Raids Again, Anguirus' last roars, before being defeated by Godzilla, caused ultrasonic-like effect which produced cracks on Osaka Castle. Anguirus was also noted to be able to emit stunning poison from his claws and back spikes. Anguirus was also originally planned to breathe an atomic ray in Godzilla Raids Again, and this was recorded in the official novelization of the film.

=== Behind the scenes ===
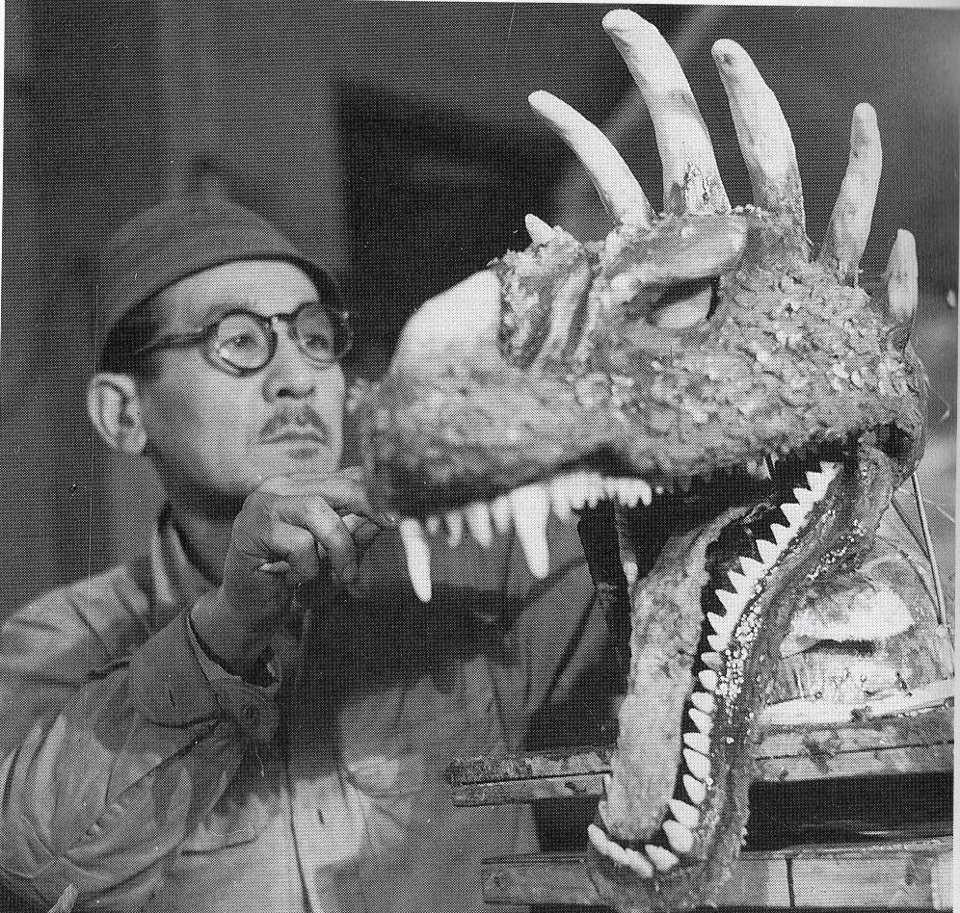
Anguirus' head under construction on the set of Godzilla Raids Again

During the existence of the character, there have been three official Anguirus suits. The first and second were constructed under the supervision of Eiji Tsuburaya. After the release of Godzilla Raids Again, Toho was looking to release the movie to Western audiences but was having trouble finding a distributor. AB-PT pictures, an American distribution company, was producing their own movie The Volcano Monsters shortly after the release of Godzilla Raids Again. AB-PT attempted to incorporate the monster footage of Toho's film into their own, but had little success. They struck up a deal between the two companies; the second Godzilla suit and the original Anguirus suit were shipped to Los Angeles to film some additional scenes. Due to financial problems with AB-PT studios, the company collapsed and its assets were absorbed into other production companies. The second Godzilla suit and the original Anguirus suit both disappeared and remain lost to this day. The second suit, created for color filming, was built in 1968. The design had no radical changes from the original aside from some modification on the thickness of the spines and arrangement of the teeth. For Godzilla: Final Wars, a third suit was built incorporating modern sculpting methods and animatronics. The final suit is darker in color and somewhat more streamlined and biologically realistic in design. During the making of Gigantis, the Fire Monster, as part of dubbing Godzilla Raids Again, Anguirus' roar was used to largely replace Godzilla's roar. Angurius' roars were created by using the sounds of a saxophone, a harmonica, an oboe, and a tuba.

== History ==
=== Shōwa period (1955–1974) ===
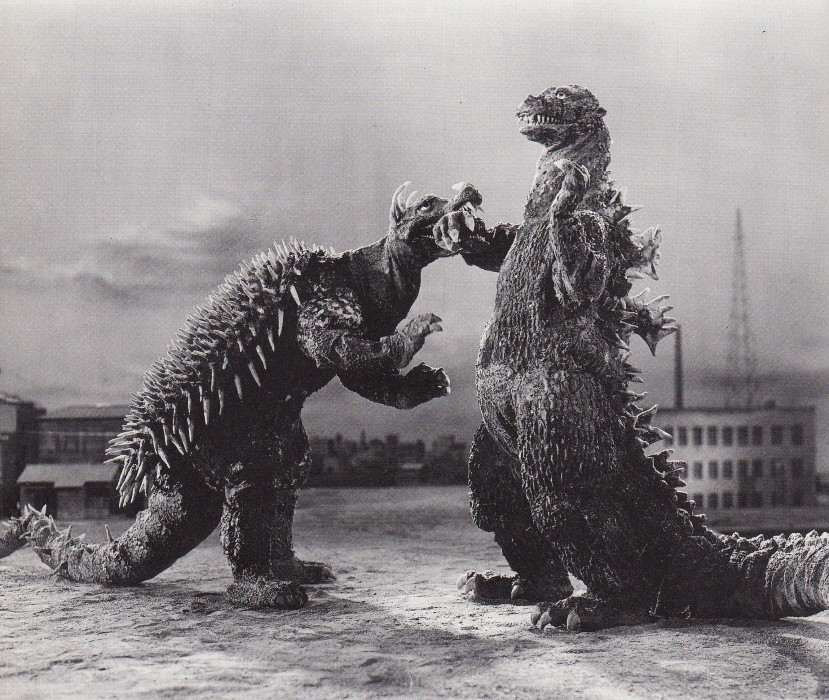
Anguirus and Godzilla in a publicity still for the 1955 film Godzilla Raids Again.

According to the English subtitles of Godzilla Raids Again, Anguirus, or "Angilas" as he was referred to in the film, was an Angilosaurus, a fictional dinosaur that lived from 150 to 70 million years ago and is described as "one of the stronger dinosaurs that lived in the prehistoric era." Additionally, he is described in a textbook by Polish world animal specialist Plateli Hondon as "one of the few creatures that had a thorough hatred for war-like predators". An individual Angilosaurus was awakened by the same hydrogen bombs that awoke Godzilla and battled him until he was killed by the latter. In the American localized or "Americanized" version of Godzilla Raids Again, in 1959 titled Gigantis, the Fire Monster, the name of the dinosaur is pronounced ""ANG-will-o-Saw-rus," and given the sub-moniker "Killer of the Living".

According to this version of the film, they ruled the Earth at one time, then disappeared suddenly. From an unnamed textbook in the movie, a scientist reads that the angilosaurs may return from hibernation due to radioactive fallout. Anguirus is also said to have "brains in several parts of his body, including the head, abdomen, and the chest". Throughout both versions of the film, Anguirus battles Godzilla on several occasions until the latter eventually kills him.

Anguirus was reintroduced in Destroy All Monsters as an ally and best friend of Godzilla living with him on Monsterland, a role that Anguirus maintained throughout Godzilla vs. Gigan (1972), Godzilla vs. Megalon (1973), and Godzilla vs. Mechagodzilla (1974). Most notably, Anguirus helps Godzilla fight King Ghidorah and Gigan and attempts to fight Mechagodzilla on his own before the robot breaks his jaw in a bloody display, forcing him to retreat underground.

The Showa Anguirus was 60 meters (197 feet) tall, 100 meters (328 feet) long and weighed 30,000 metric tons.

=== Millennium period (2004) ===
Anguirus as featured in the 2004 film Godzilla: Final Wars

Anguirus was intended to appear in the unmade film Godzilla X Varan, Baragon, and Anguirus: Giant Monsters All-Out Attack. However, Toho requested that director Shusuke Kaneko replace Anguirus and Varan with the more popular Mothra and King Ghidorah, respectively, leading to the release of the film Godzilla, Mothra and King Ghidorah: Giant Monsters All-Out Attack.

Anguirus returned in the 2004 film, Godzilla: Final Wars after a 30 year screen absence, as a brainwashed pawn of the Xiliens. The aliens secretly dispatch Anguirus to attack Shanghai, where it battles the flying United Nations battleship, Karyu, until the Xiliens teleport Anguirus away to make humanity believe they had destroyed the monster. Once humanity discovers the Xiliens' true objective, the latter send fighters and Anguirus to destroy the Karyu. Following this, Anguirus, Rodan, and King Caesar are dispatched to confront Godzilla, but are ultimately defeated.

In the English dub of the 2004 film during Anguirus' confrontation with the battleship Karyu, one crew member erroneously calls it "the Angweenus." While this is only a translation error, it has been the subject of some fan affection.

The Millennium Anguirus was 90 meters (295 feet) tall, 160 meters (525 feet) long and weighed 60,000 metric tons.

=== Reiwa period (2017–2021) ===
In the prologue for the film Godzilla: Planet of the Monsters, the corpses of Anguirus and Rodan make a cameo appearance, having been killed by a bio-weapon created by the Chinese military. This is expanded upon in the prequel novel Godzilla: Monster Apocalypse, in which Anguirus and Rodan attacked Beijing before they were killed by the bio-weapon, Hedorah. Additionally, two other members of Anguirus' species appear, with one attacking South Africa and the other killed by Godzilla in Los Angeles.

In the Godzilla Singular Point anime series, Anguirus scavenges several Rodan carcasses from a JSDF base in Chiba Prefecture's forests and terrorizes the locals, with the local mayor's son coining the monster's name for his resemblance to ankylosaurs. After Anguirus hinders military responses with his ability to predict attacks and deflect projectiles by vibrating his spines, the JSDF, local hunters, and the Otaki Factory's mecha Jet Jaguar join forces to lure out Anguirus. Upon discovering the creature can use quantum mechanics due to his extra-dimensional composition to predict the future, they temporarily stun him with a harpoon gun, but he attacks the mayor's photoshoot, leading to Jet Jaguar killing Anguirus with a point-blank harpoon shot. The mecha's inventor later takes one of Anguirus' horns as a trophy and to fashion into a spear for Jet Jaguar.

== Appearances ==
In Godzilla: King of the Monsters (2019), a skeleton seemingly resembling Anguirus appears within an ancient sunken city in Godzilla's lair. Director Michael Dougherty stated that it "might or might not be Anguirus".

=== Films ===
- Godzilla Raids Again (1955)
- Gigantis, the Fire Monster (1959)
- Destroy All Monsters (1968)
- All Monsters Attack (1969, stock footage cameo)
- Godzilla vs. Gigan (1972)
- Godzilla vs. Megalon (1973)
- Godzilla vs. Mechagodzilla (1974)
- Godzilla: Final Wars (2004)

=== Television ===
- Godzilland (1992–1993)
- Godzilla Island (1997–1998)
- Godzilla Singular Point (2021)
- Godziban (2019–present)
- Chibi Godzilla Raids Again (2023–present)

=== Video games ===
- Godzilla / Godzilla-Kun: Kaijuu Daikessen (Game Boy – 1990)
- Battle Soccer: Field no Hasha (SNES – 1992)
- Kaijū-ō Godzilla / King of the Monsters, Godzilla (Game Boy – 1993)
- Godzilla: Battle Legends (Turbo Duo – 1993)
- Godzilla: Monster War / Godzilla: Destroy All Monsters (Super Famicom – 1994)
- Godzilla Giant Monster March (Game Gear – 1995)
- Godzilla Trading Battle (PlayStation – 1998)
- Godzilla: Destroy All Monsters Melee (GCN, Xbox – 2002/2003)
- Godzilla: Domination! (GBA – 2002)
- Godzilla: Save the Earth (Xbox, PS2 – 2004)
- Godzilla: Unleashed (Wii, PS2 – 2007)
- Godzilla Unleashed: Double Smash (NDS – 2007)
- Godzilla (PS3, PS4 – 2014)
- Godzilla Defense Force (2019)
- Magic: The Gathering Arena – Anguirus, Armored Killer / Gemrazer (2020)
- Godzilla Battle Line (2021)

=== Literature ===
- Godzilla and Godzilla Raids Again (novellas adapting films – 1955)
- Godzilla at World's End (novel – 1998)
- Godzilla vs. the Robot Monsters (novel – 1999)
- Godzilla: Kingdom of Monsters (comic – 2011–2012)
- Godzilla: Gangsters and Goliaths (comic – 2011)
- Godzilla: Legends (comic – 2011–2012)
- Godzilla: Ongoing (comic – 2012)
- Godzilla: The Half-Century War (comic – 2012–2013)
- Godzilla: Rulers of Earth (comic – 2013–2015)
- Godzilla: Cataclysm (comic – 2014)
- Godzilla in Hell (comic – 2015)
- Godzilla: Oblivion (comic – 2016)
- Godzilla: Monster Apocalypse (novel – 2017)

== Bibliography ==
- Lees, J.D.; Cerasini, Marc (1998). The Official Godzilla Compendium. Random House. ISBN 0679888225.
- Ryfle, Steve (1998). Japan's Favorite Mon-Star: The Unauthorized Biography of the Big G. ECW Press. ISBN 1550223488.
