= Godzilla: Unleashed =

2007 video game

- Developers: Pipeworks Software; Santa Cruz Games (DS)
- Publisher: Atari
- Series: Godzilla
- Platforms: Wii, PlayStation 2, Nintendo DS
- Release: Nintendo DS: NA: November 20, 2007; AU: December 5, 2007; EU: February 22, 2008; PlayStation 2: NA: November 20, 2007; EU: February 22, 2008; AU: February 29, 2008; Wii: NA: December 5, 2007; EU: February 22, 2008; AU: February 29, 2008
- Genre: Fighting
- Modes: Single player, multiplayer

Godzilla: Unleashed is a 3D fighting video game based on Toho's Godzilla franchise. It was developed by Pipeworks Software and published by Atari. The game was released in North America on November 20, 2007 for PlayStation 2; and on December 5 of the same year for the Wii. A Nintendo DS version, titled Godzilla Unleashed: Double Smash, was developed by Santa Cruz Games and released in North America on December 5, 2007.

Unleashed serves as a sequel to 2004's Godzilla: Save the Earth, itself a sequel to 2002's Godzilla: Destroy All Monsters Melee. The game features over 20 Kaiju and Mechas from the Shōwa (1954–1975), Heisei (1984–1995), and Millennium (1999–2004) era films, as well as two original Toho-approved creations.

== Gameplay ==
King Caesar and Anguirus in battle

Like its predecessors, Godzilla Unleashed plays as a 3D fighting game with the option to play with up to four monsters in free-for-all or team battles. While the PS2 version involves only button presses, the Wii version uses a combination of button presses and motion control using the Wii Remote and Nunchuk. Basic punch and kick attacks are through the A and B buttons while more powerful and aggressive strikes require swinging of the remote up, down or sideways while pressing A and/or B. Movement is done by the analog stick on the Nunchuk, and flicking it upwards allows players to jump. Flicking both the remote and Nunchuk allows monsters to grab nearby opponents or environmental objects, and throw them. Weapon and beam attacks also return, but are much weaker and do not lock on. However, they can be sustained for much longer periods. Rage Mode from the previous games is absent, but monsters can achieve "Critical Mass" by destroying the energy crystals found in arenas, which causes them to increase in size temporarily, glow red (similar looking to Burning Godzilla from Godzilla vs. Destoroyah), and deal more damage.

Monsters can also use "Power Surges", temporary abilities used only once per battle, per monster. Surges increase certain traits; for example, the Fire Surge increases damage dealt, and the Speed Surge increases speed. They can also decrease abilities like Shield Surge, which increases defense while slowing movement. Others can improve and damage others, like Radiation Surge, which enhances health regeneration while impairing that of nearby monsters. Before the Surge is over, monsters can release a powerful shockwave attack. In the single-player Story Mode, multiple Power Surges can be collected through defeating an enemy monster afflicted with the Surge. In multiplayer mode, the Surges are obtained by destroying Surge Crystals that pop up in the environment.

Along with destructible environments, Earth's Military or the Vortaak's Forces are present, depending on the arena/city. Both will attack certain monsters each time. Monsters are attacked under differing circumstances. For example, Global Defense Force monsters will be attacked by humans if they go out of their way to destroy human buildings and military units, being on the same side. The same goes for Alien monsters and the Vortaak. Destruction of crystals and use of Power Surges and Critical Mass can also affect military attitude towards certain monsters. In Story Mode, the Atragon appears multiple times throughout but due to the personal attitude of its Admiral, it will attack regardless of actions or faction.

=== Playable monsters ===
Monsters are divided into four factions: Earth Defenders, Global Defense Force, Aliens, and Mutants. In Story Mode, monsters of particular factions have different goals and take on a different order of missions. Each faction also has different styles of play and what they consider friend or foe. Some choose to destroy the crystals to get rid of them while others intend to abuse their powers, and so will reflect this depending on how the player chooses to act throughout. As players gain points with some factions for obtaining Power Surges, obtaining all seven Power Surges will null any allegiances the player has and unlock a secret level called "Tyrant", in which the player's chosen monster is given unlimited Critical Mass, but is forced to brawl against several monsters who may or may not have been former allies.

Both console versions of the game include all 18 playable monsters from Godilla: Save the Earth plus Obsidius, an original monster created by Pipeworks and chosen from four potential designs in a fan vote conducted on IGN. Each version features exclusive monsters not found in the other version; the Wii version adds seven new monsters, including the original monster Krystalak, for a total of 26, while the PS2 version includes only one unique monster for a total of 20. New characters are marked below in bold.

Playable characters
Earth Defenders	Global Defense Force	Aliens	Mutants
Anguirus; Baragon; Fire Rodan; **Godzilla 1954** (Note: Wii only) (Note: Not playable in training or story mode on Wii); Godzilla 90s; Godzilla 2000; **King Caesar**; Mothra; **Varan**	Jet Jaguar; Kiryu; Mechagodzilla 2; Mecha-King Ghidorah; MOGUERA	Gigan; King Ghidorah; **Mechagodzilla**; Megalon; Orga	**Battra** (Note: PS2 Only); **Biollante**; Destoroyah; **Krystalak**; Megaguirus; **Obsidius**; SpaceGodzilla; **Titanosaurus**

=== Double Smash ===
The Nintendo DS version of Unleashed, Double Smash, features gameplay akin to a side-scroller, similar to that of the Godzilla: Monster of Monsters!. Using the two-screen display of the Nintendo DS, players control flying monsters on the top screen and grounded monsters on the bottom screen, switching control between the two at any time. A multiplayer option allows for a different player to control each monster. Players can control Anguirus, Gigan, Godzilla, Krystalak, or Megalon on the ground, and Battra, Destoroyah, Fire Rodan, King Ghidorah or Mothra in the air.

== Story ==
King Ghidorah face-to-face with Gigan

Unleashed occurs 20 years after Godzilla: Save the Earth, beginning when a meteor shower causes climate shifts and earthquakes. Simultaneously, monsters of Earth begin attacking cities across the globe due to crystals growing on the ground. The Vortaak, returning from the previous games, chose to invade and use the crystals to seize Earth. Factions form among the members of Earth and the monsters, totaling four monster factions: Earth Defenders, made up of natural monsters protecting their territory; Global Defense Force, made up of mechas built to protect humanity; Aliens, made up of allies of the Vortaak invaders; and Mutants, made up of monsters drawn to the power of the crystals. Choices in the story affect later events, including the relationships between Earth and the monster factions.

It is revealed in the finale that the source of the crystals was SpaceGodzilla trying to escape his interdimensional prison that he was trapped in at the end of Save the Earth. The game has four different endings depending on which faction you are on. Earth Defenders and Global Defense monsters remove the crystals, defeat the mutants, run off the Vortaak, and are congratulated by the human forces. Players on the Alien faction destroy the human forces and see Vorticia laugh in victory. Those on the Mutant faction allow the crystals to spread rapidly, and will witness SpaceGodzilla roar in victory. Any monster who has acquired all of the Power Surges will become corrupted and evil, with the reporter saying the player's monster was their only hope.

== Development ==
Before the game was released, there was a six page 'designer diary' hosted on IGN that provided some information about working on the game. The first interview of the game with Pipeworks stated that the title was completely new and is specifically designed with the Wii Remote in mind. There were also plans to use WiiConnect24 support for downloading purposes, but this was not in the completed game. First screenshots of the PS2 version of the game were released during September 2007. A PSP version was also planned.

On October 9, 2007, IGN's development blog has revealed that Heavy Melody created the soundtrack for the game and that every monster has a unique theme song that ties to the overall feeling of their faction. On October 19, 2007, IGN stated that the PSP version of Godzilla: Unleashed was canceled; however, it was said that if the Wii version of the game sells well, they would consider bringing back the PSP version.

On November 9, 2007, GameSpot posted the sixth designer diary with lead developer Simon Strange talking about the factions' importance.

== Reception ==
Reception

Aggregate score
Aggregator	Score		
Aggregator	DS	PS2	Wii
Metacritic	28/100	38/100	44/100

Review scores
Publication	Score		
Publication	DS	PS2	Wii
1Up.com	N/A	N/A	D+
Destructoid	N/A	2.5/10	N/A
Eurogamer	N/A	N/A	2/10
Game Informer	N/A	N/A	4/10
GameSpot	2/10	3/10	3.5/10
GameSpy	1/5	N/A	2.5/5
GamesRadar+	2/5	2/5	N/A
GameTrailers	N/A	N/A	5/10
GameZone	3/10	5/10	4/10
IGN	3/10	4.9/10	4.9/10
Nintendo Power	3/10	N/A	5.5/10

Unleashed received negative reviews on all platforms, according to video game review aggregator Metacritic. Play Magazine called the Wii version "among the best fighters for the system", while GameSpot stated, "Unleashed is the worst thing to happen to Godzilla since getting killed by Mothra's babies."

GameSpy praised the large lineup of playable kaiju as "ample fan service" while showing disappointment over the new original kaiju, Obsidius and Krystalak, being "a shame that these guys make the cut while classic foes like Hedorah and Battra are MIA (or confined to the PS2 version in Battra's case)."

The controls were criticized the most by critics, reportedly being unresponsive at times. Nintendo Power said of the Wii version, "Though Godzilla Unleashed is fairly accessible, even casual gamers may wonder why their creatures don't always do what they want," while IGN experienced "a good deal of lag between when you swing the Wiimote and when your monster attacks." Game Informer, however, more bluntly called them a "complete slop".

The visuals were also criticized, with GameTrailers stating that the Wii version's films "are often seen as classics because of their low production values and hokey monster designs. Still, Godzilla Unleashed is simply unattractive with its low-res textures and washed-out color palette."

The game eventually sold around 800,000 units over its lifetime, outselling both Godzilla: Destroy All Monsters Melee and Godzilla: Save the Earth, the two previous games in the series.

Critical reaction to Double Smash was also largely negative. IGN gave the game a score of 3 out of 10, saying: "None of the recent Godzilla games have been very good, but at least they were fun. Godzilla Unleashed: Double Smash cannot make this claim. It looks terrible, and reduces the King of the Monsters to a mush of no-texture polygons, then puts him in a tedious series of punching planes and kicking boats." GameSpot gave Double Smash a 2 out of 10, calling it "one of the worst DS games ever made," adding: "With a perfect storm of terrible game design, bad play mechanics, and uninspired destruction, this game does what oxidation bombs, volcanoes, and Matthew Broderick couldn't: It kills Godzilla." GameSpy gave the game a 1 out of 5, saying: "This brain-dead combat is perhaps the worst part of Double Smash. Slowly plodding through the stale levels, fighting the same enemies, and using the same techniques to win grows old almost immediately."
