= Godzilla: Battle Legends =

1993 video game

- Developer: Toho/Alfa System
- Publisher: Toho (Japan) Hudson Soft (US)
- Series: Godzilla
- Platform: Turbo Duo
- Release: JP: February 26, 1994; NA: 1994
- Genre: Fighting
- Mode: Up to 2 players simultaneously

Godzilla: Battle Legends, simply referred to as Godzilla in North America, is a fighting game based on the Godzilla film franchise, made for the Turbo Duo in 1993, developed by Alfa System and published in the United States by Hudson Soft.

When Godzilla fights a certain foe, his appearance changes to reflect the era when he battled in certain films. For example, Godzilla looks like as he did in 1955 when he fights Anguirus, and as in 1964 when he fights Rodan. This game's sequel, Godzilla: Monster War for the SNES, features fewer monsters, with the inclusion of Biollante as a playable character and Mothra.

In single player mode, only Godzilla is playable.

== Characters ==
- Godzilla (55, 64, 65, 71, 72, 73, 75, 89, 91 and 92)
- Anguirus
- Rodan
- King Ghidorah (Showa, Heisei and "Mecha")
- Hedorah (Final) (Hedorah uses flying mode for some of his attacks)
- Gigan
- Megalon
- Mechagodzilla (74/MK 1, 75/MK 2 and 93/Super Mechagodzilla)
- Super X II
- Biollante (both forms rose & final, nonplayable, boss)
- Battra (Larva and Imago)

== Reception ==
Reception

Review scores
Publication	Score
Electronic Gaming Monthly	8/10, 5/10, 6/10, 5/10
Famitsu	9/10, 6/10, 7/10, 7/10
Gekkan PC Engine	65/100, 75/100, 75/100, 75/100, 80/100
Dengeki PC Engine	85/100, 85/100, 90/100, 85/100
VideoGames	8/10

Award
Publication	Award
VideoGames (1994)	Best Turbo Duo Game

According to Famitsu, Godzilla: Battle Legends sold over 2,188 copies in its first month on the market in Japan. The Japanese publication Micom BASIC Magazine ranked the game fourth in popularity in its May 1994 issue, and it received a 21.4/30 score in a readers' poll conducted by PC Engine Fan. It received mixed reviews from critics. VideoGames named it "Best Turbo Duo Game" of 1994, over Beyond Shadowgate and Might and Magic III: Isles of Terra.
