= Gigan =

Kaiju from Godzilla franchise

- Godzilla character
- Gigan as portrayed by Kenpachiro Satsuma via suitmation in Godzilla vs. Gigan
- First appearance: Godzilla vs. Gigan (1972)
- Last appearance: Chibi Godzilla Raids Again (2024)
- Created by: Kaoru Mabuchi; Jun Fukuda
- Portrayed by: Shōwa era: Kenpachiro Satsuma (Note: Credited as Kengo Nakayama.); Isao Zushi; Millennium era: Kazuhiro Yoshida
- Voiced by: Mamoru Miyano (Chibi Godzilla Raids Again)

In-universe information
- Alias: Borodan
- Species: Extraterrestrial cyborg
- Gender: Male
- Affiliation: Nebulans (Showa era); Xilliens (Millennium era); Megalon (ally)

Gigan (Japanese: ガイガン, Hepburn: Gaigan) is a kaiju created by Kaoru Mabuchi and Jun Fukuda who first appears in Toho's 1972 film Godzilla vs. Gigan directed by Jun Fukuda. In the Showa era, Gigan is an extraterrestrial avian monster transformed into a cyborg by the alien race named the Nebulans, while in the Millennium era, he is a bioweapon retrieved and created by the Xilliens who fought Mothra millennia ago before he was defeated by her and awakened by the Xilliens in the present time.

Sporting a buzzsaw in his frontal abdominal region, large metallic hooks for hands, and a bird-like beak, he is considered one of Godzilla's most brutal and violent opponents, and the first kaiju in the Toho sci-fi series to make him noticeably bleed. Complex listed the character as No. 2 on its "The 15 Most Badass Kaiju Monsters of All Time" list.

== Overview ==
=== Development and design ===
Gigan was created during the early 1970s when the Godzilla films had undergone a comic book-like shift in tone. Special effects were now purely science fiction fare and budgets were greatly reduced, and Gigan was designed as both a marketing ploy for children's toys and as a completely alien creature whose design would not have necessitated the same attention to detail needed for Godzilla's previously more earthly opponents.

The character was first conceived by Kaoru Mabuchi in his script Godzilla vs. the Space Monsters – Earth Defense Directive, which contained elements that would later be incorporated into Godzilla vs. Gigan, including having a mind-controlled Gigan teaming up with King Ghidorah, though the script also included Megalon. The mastermind behind the space monsters' actions would have been a living brain called Miko.

The first Gigan suit was designed by illustrator Takayoshi Mizuki, modeled by suitmaker Noboyuki Yasamaru, and was worn by Kenpachiro Satsuma, who had starred as Hedorah's suit actor in Godzilla vs. Hedorah. The two initially did not get on well during filming, as Yasamaru focused more on the suit's appearance than on its practicality, at one point making the character's hand-hooks out of pure fiberglass, which made lifting them almost impossible. In portraying Gigan, Satsuma deliberately emphasized the character's destructive personality. For Gigan's appearance in Zone Fighter, Satsuma did not reprise the role. Special effects director Teruyoshi Nakano had initially wanted to give Gigan the ability to fire a laser beam from his forehead as a homage to Buddha sporting a halo around his head, but the idea was scrapped, as Nakano felt that the character was already powerful enough. The beam was nevertheless included in some promotional stills, along with various Godzilla video games.

== History ==
=== Showa era (1972-1973) ===
Gigan debuts in the 1972 film Godzilla vs. Gigan, in which he and King Ghidorah are summoned to Earth by the Nebulans, cockroach-like alien race whose planet had been ravaged by another race and wish to subjugate the Earth in order to create a utopia of "perfect peace". However, the monsters are challenged and defeated by Godzilla and Anguirus.

In the 1973 film, Godzilla vs. Megalon, Gigan is sent by the Nebulans to assist the Seatopians in their assault on humanity by aiding their god, Megalon, in a battle against Godzilla and Jet Jaguar. After having his arm broken by Jet Jaguar however, Gigan retreats into outer space, leaving Megalon to face Godzilla and Jet Jaguar alone.

In the same year, Gigan also makes an appearance in Toho's television series Zone Fighter. After his battle with Godzilla and Jet Jaguar, Gigan is captured by an alien race called the Garogans and sent back to Earth to prevent Godzilla from rescuing Zone Fighter. He was temporarily defeated by the former, but revived once Godzilla left and faced Zone Fighter, who eventually killed Gigan.

=== Millennium era (2004) ===
After a 31-year absence, Gigan returned in the film Godzilla: Final Wars. Millennia prior, Gigan was an ancient bioweapon created by the alien race called Xillien who had fought Mothra for the fate of the Earth and was defeated. In the present time, his mummified body is discovered in Hokkaido and Xilliens awaken Gigan to assist them in destroying Earth and destroy the Gotengo to stop its human and mutant occupants from awakening Godzilla at Antarctica. While Gigan disables the Gotengo, the crew succeed of freeing Godzilla. Gigan faces Godzilla in battle, but is defeated after Godzilla decapitates his head with atomic breath. The Xiliens recover and modify Gigan with chainsaw to assist Monster X in fighting Godzilla at Tokyo. However, Gigan battles Mothra once more, but inadvertently decapitates himself with his own razor disks after he attempts to kill Mothra before she destroys him once and for all.

=== Reiwa era (2022) ===
Gigan returned in Gemstone's GvG and Godzilla vs. Gigan Rex, in which Godzilla battles an army of Gigan soldiers known as Gigan Miles, led by the elite red-colored Gigan Rex.

Chibi Gigan appears in the Japanese series Chibi Godzilla Raids Again, voiced by Mamoru Miyano, in which he is shown as a assignee who tries to retrieve Chibi Mechagodzilla and destroy Monster Island. Chibi Gigan is always easily refuted and persuaded, so he never achieves his goal.

== Appearances ==
Gigan as featured in Godzilla: Final Wars (top) and in the CGI short film Godzilla vs. Gigan Rex (bottom)

=== Films ===
- Godzilla vs. Gigan (1972)
- Godzilla vs. Megalon (1973)
- Godzilla: Final Wars (2004)

=== Television ===
- Zone Fighter (1973)
- Godzilland (1992–1993)
- Godzilla Island (1997–1998)
- Chibi Godzilla Raids Again (2024–present)

=== Web content ===
- Godziban (2019–present)
- Godzilla vs. Gigan Rex (2022)
- Fest Godzilla 3: Gigan Attacks (2022)
- Godzilla vs. Megalon (2023)
- Godziburst (2025)

=== Video games ===
- Godzilla: Monster of Monsters! (NES – 1988)
- Kaijū-ō Godzilla / King of the Monsters, Godzilla (Game Boy – 1993)
- Godzilla: Battle Legends (Turbo Duo – 1993)
- Godzilla: Monster War / Godzilla: Destroy All Monsters (Super Famicom – 1994)
- Godzilla Giant Monster March (Game Gear – 1995)
- Godzilla Trading Battle (PlayStation – 1998)
- Godzilla: Destroy All Monsters Melee (GameCube, Xbox – 2002/2003)
- Godzilla: Save the Earth (Xbox, PS2 – 2004)
- Godzilla: Unleashed (Wii – 2007) – The Millennium version is exclusive in the Wii version.
- Godzilla: Unleashed (PS2 – 2007) – The Showa version is exclusive to the PlayStation 2 version.
- Godzilla: The Game (PS3, PS4)
- Godzilla Defense Force (2019)
- Godzilla Battle Line (2021)
- GigaBash (PS4, PS5, Steam, Epic Games - 2022)

=== Literature ===
- Godzilla at World's End (novel – 1998)
- Godzilla: Legends (comic; 2011–2012)
- Godzilla: Ongoing (comic – 2012)
- Godzilla: The Half-Century War (comic; 2012–2013)
- Godzilla: Rulers of Earth (comic; 2013–2015)
- Godzilla: Oblivion (comic – 2016)
- Godzilla: Project Mechagodzilla (novel – 2018)

=== Music ===
- Gigan (a.k.a. Zymeer) is a rapper from hip-hop group Monsta Island Czars also featured on the Take Me to Your Leader album.
- Guitar virtuoso Buckethead wrote a song called "Gigan", as well as another named "Mecha Gigan". They appear on his 2006 albums The Elephant Man's Alarm Clock and Crime Slunk Scene.
