= Godzilla (2014 video game) =

2014 video game

- Developer: Natsume Atari
- Publisher: Bandai Namco Games
- Series: Godzilla
- Engine: PhyreEngine
- Platforms: PlayStation 3, PlayStation 4
- Release: PlayStation 3: JP: December 18, 2014; NA: July 14, 2015; EU: July 17, 2015; PlayStation 4: NA: July 14, 2015; JP: July 16, 2015; EU: July 17, 2015
- Genres: Action-adventure, fighting
- Modes: Single player, multiplayer

Godzilla (Note: Japanese: ゴジラ Godzilla, Hepburn: Gojira Godzilla) (also known as Godzilla: The Game) is a 2014 video game developed by Natsume Atari and published by Bandai Namco Games for the PlayStation 3 and PlayStation 4 based on the Japanese monster Godzilla franchise by Toho. It was first released on December 18, 2014, in Japan only for the PlayStation 3. It was released on July 14, 2015, in North America and on July 17, 2015, in Europe. The Western PlayStation 4 version is based on the upgraded Japanese release called Godzilla VS, released on July 14, 2015, containing more content such as additional monsters.

== Gameplay ==
=== God of Destruction mode ===
Destruction mode consists of the player controlling Godzilla as he attacks certain stages (10 areas manually selected at the end of each round, from 25 levels), and is similar to Godzilla Generations. In order to clear the stage, the player must destroy all of the G-Energy Generators in the map, while also being attacked by G-Force and occasionally a boss (bosses must also be defeated to complete an area). Some of these stages are timed and the player must destroy all of the Generators before the timer expires. As Godzilla destroys objects such as buildings, G-Energy Generators, and military vehicles, he will increase in size. Godzilla begins the campaign at 50 meters in height, and can reach an almost limitless size. Bosses that Godzilla faces will be leveled at the appropriate height based on Godzilla's current size, although sometimes they are larger on the harder levels. But if Godzilla dies and the level is retried, the boss becomes smaller in size. In order to complete Destruction Mode and reach the game's true final boss, the player must exceed 100 meters in height by the last stage. After the credits roll the player will begin the final stage as Burning Godzilla and be attacked by the Super X3 and several DAG-MB96 Maser Cannons (also, enemies firing freeze missiles). After this, the Legendary Godzilla will appear as the game's true final boss and must be defeated before the timer expires and Godzilla reaches meltdown. After Legendary Godzilla is defeated, the game's final cutscene will be triggered. If playing through God of Destruction mode as the Legendary Godzilla, the incarnations switch places and Burning Godzilla is the final boss. In the PS4 edition, all the characters are playable, so players can choose any monster of their liking.

Godzilla, Mothra and King Ghidorah battling each other in the game.

=== King of Kaiju mode ===
"King of Kaiju" is a game mode where the player plays through six stages, each with a different monster to fight. The monsters increase in strength the further the player progresses. The weaker monsters will appear in the first two waves (such as Mothra and Jet Jaguar), slightly harder monsters in the third and fourth, and the most powerful monsters in the final two stages (such as King Ghidorah, Gigan and Kiryu). The Heisei Godzilla, Burning Godzilla, the Hollywood (Legendary) Godzilla, and other kaiju are all playable in this mode.

=== Evolution mode ===
As the player defeats certain enemies and destroys certain structures in Destruction Mode, new abilities will be unlocked and can be applied to Godzilla in this mode. Godzilla can receive new attacks, including the "victory dance" from Invasion of Astro-Monster, as well as atomic breath upgrades, including the ability to use atomic breath to fly as in Godzilla vs. Hedorah, as well as fire Minilla's smoke rings or use a white misty atomic breath based on that used by the original Godzilla in 1954.

=== Diorama mode ===
Throughout the game, the player will unlock monster models and other objects that can be placed in an environment and viewed from various angles and used to take screen-shots, allowing the player to recreate battles from the films or the game, or to create fantasy battles.

=== Kaiju Field Guide ===
The player will also unlock biographies for various monsters from the Godzilla series beyond just those featured in the game, which appear here. These bios include pictures of the monsters from films they appear in, as well as information about the monsters' attributes and film appearances.

=== Online multiplayer mode ===
Exclusive to the PS4 version, the game features an online multiplayer mode in which two to three players can battle one another with a selection of kaiju also exclusive to the PS4.

== Characters ==
=== Playable kaiju ===
- Godzilla (1989, 1964, 1995, and 2014)
- Anguirus (Showa)
- Rodan (Showa)
- Mothra (Heisei Larva and Imago)
- King Ghidorah (Heisei)
- Hedorah (Showa)
- Mechagodzilla (1974 and 1975)
- Biollante
- Battra (Larva and Imago)
- SpaceGodzilla
- Destoroyah
- Gigan (Modified 2004)
- Super Mechagodzilla
- Mecha-King Ghidorah
- Type-3 Kiryu
- Jet Jaguar

== Development ==
Godzilla was revealed in Japan on June 26, 2014, with a trailer uploaded to YouTube by Bandai Namco Japan.

In late-mid-August, Japan's Famitsu magazine revealed the game would be released on December 18, 2014, in Japan, and on August 29, 2014, Bandai Namco released a second trailer for the game. On November 18, 2014, the third trailer was released by Bandai Namco. On December 5, the game's Japanese demo was released to the Japanese PlayStation Network.

On December 5, 2014, the English release of the game was revealed in The Game Awards for PlayStation 3 and PlayStation 4, and was scheduled to be released on July 14, 2015, in North America and July 17, 2015, in Europe. All kaiju who previously appeared in the PlayStation 3 release are included, with the addition of SpaceGodzilla, Mecha-King Ghidorah, Rodan, Anguirus, Mechagodzilla 1974, Godzilla 1964 and Battra (Larva and Imago) as PlayStation 4 exclusives. The game was delisted from PlayStation Store in late 2017, presumably in December.

== Reception ==
Reception

Aggregate score
Aggregator	Score
Metacritic	PS4: 38/100

Review scores
Publication	Score
4Players	35%
Destructoid	4/10
Famitsu	PS3: 29/40; PS4: 30/40
Game Informer	3/10
GameRevolution	1.5/5
GameSpot	3/10
GamesRadar+	1/5
GamesTM	3/10
IGN	4.5/10
Push Square	5/10
Shacknews	5/10
Digital Spy	1/5

Upon release in the West, Godzilla was met with a negative response with an average critic score of 38 out of 100 on Metacritic, with many reviewers criticizing an outdated presentation of the graphics and level design, while also noting awkward movement controls and repetition. James Stephanie Sterling stated it "has the look and feel of a small budget game" rather than a "major 'AAA' release" while Jordon Devore reviewing for Destructoid called it "a letdown" given the premise. Several online personalities also noted the lack of local co-op gameplay, the most widely cited complaint being that a one-on-one fighting game should incorporate the most basic function of the genre with the online mode instead being a preferred extra feature. However, some critics did note the faithful recreation of the monsters themselves and amount of content for long time Godzilla fans with Jon Ryan reviewing for IGN noting that while the overall game had a "lack of substantial gameplay", "the spirit of the old-school monster movie is where Bandai Namco absolutely nails it."

The game has developed a cult following among the Godzilla fandom in the years since it was delisted from digital storefronts.
