= Super Godzilla =

1993 video game

- North American cover art
- Developer: Advance Communication Company
- Publisher: Toho
- Producers: Masato Takeno; Junichi Tsunoda; Seigo Taniguchi; Michiharu Hasuya; MIS
- Composers: Michiharu Hasuya; Junko Yokoyama
- Series: Godzilla
- Platform: Super Nintendo Entertainment System
- Release: JP: 23 December 1993; NA: July 1994
- Genre: Action
- Mode: Single-player

Super Godzilla (超ゴジラ, Chō-Gojira) is a video game for the Super Nintendo Entertainment System released in Japan on December 23, 1993, and in North America in July 1994. It is based on Toho's Godzilla franchise and was developed by Advance Communication Company.

== Gameplay ==
The player must guide Godzilla through different levels, destroying obstacles and fighting enemies along the way while preserving Godzilla's energy level (decreased by destroying obstacles or by enemy attacks) and working against a time limit. The game is split in two screens: the top displays Godzilla's actions, while the bottom one is a map that shows his location on the current level. When Godzilla finds a monster to battle, the game switches to a side-view fighting segment.

=== Playable monsters ===
- Godzilla - Defender of Japan, the atomic dinosaur that once destroyed civilization became humanity's only hope for survival. In his quest to rid the Earth of its aggressors, Godzilla is aided by a small band of humans that control the King of the Monsters as he faces other monsters.
- Super Godzilla (Japanese Name: 超ゴジラ, Chō-Gojira) - After King Ghidorah is resurrected as Mecha-King Ghidorah, the human characters determine that Godzilla must increase in power, and so Godzilla has to seek out the three capsules of Super S energy to become Super Godzilla. After defeating Mecha-King Ghidorah, Bagan, the ultimate enemy monster of the game appears and Godzilla again changes into Super Godzilla in order to combat him.

=== Enemy monsters ===
- King Ghidorah
- Mechagodzilla (the Japanese version has the Heisei Mechagodzilla; the US version has the original Showa Mechagodzilla as Godzilla vs. Mechagodzilla II had not been released internationally yet.)
- Biollante
- Battra
- Mecha-King Ghidorah
- Bagan — an ancient creature of Chinese origin, augmented with King Ghidorah's DNA and Dr. Shiragami's serum, who serves as the game's final boss. Bagan, though having never appeared in the Godzilla film series, was originally developed for two unproduced Toho films throughout the 1980s and 1990s, being scrapped for both of them before production began. He would later be planned to appear in a 1995 film, though was scrapped once again.
- UFO (must battle them consistently beginning in Stage 2 unless Godzilla finds and destroys the Mothership in each stage)

== Story ==
When King Ghidorah suddenly attacks Osaka, the military deploys the Super X II to locate Godzilla, and they use a transmitter to control the mutant dinosaur. Godzilla is led to Osaka, where he fights and kills King Ghidorah. Immediately afterwards, Ghidorah's body vanishes and an alien spaceship appears. The invaders reveal that they were controlling Ghidorah, and demand that the human race surrender. Meanwhile, another Godzilla appears in Mt. Fuji, and the Super X II lures the real Godzilla there to fight it. Godzilla confronts the new Godzilla, who is revealed to be Mechagodzilla wearing an artificial skin. During Godzilla's fight with the robot, the aliens kidnap Dr. Shiragami and take him to Lake Ashino. Godzilla goes there to rescue the professor, and is confronted by Biollante, his plant-like clone. After defeating Biollante, the Super X II rescues Shiragami, it is revealed that the doctor had recovered DNA samples of Godzilla and King Ghidorah and had been experimenting on them to create a serum that enhances the physical attributes of any being. However, the aliens invaded his laboratory and stole the samples, using them to create Biollante.

Dr. Shiragami injects some of the serum into Godzilla, making him stronger. The aliens unleash Battra in Yokohama, and it lays an egg that is threatening to hatch. Godzilla travels to Yokohama, kills Battra, and destroys the egg before it can hatch. King Ghidorah soon returns as Mecha-King Ghidorah, having been resurrected by the aliens, and begins to attack Yokohama. The aliens reveal that they have hidden several capsules around the city that are holding Shiragami's serum. If Godzilla can find them all before Mecha-King Ghidorah destroys fifty percent of the city, he will mutate into a more powerful form dubbed "Super Godzilla." He succeeds, and confronts Mecha-King Ghidorah. The cyborg monster is easily outmatched by Godzilla's newfound power and is destroyed. However, the battle is far from over. The aliens travel to the past, where they find and awaken an ancient creature called Bagan and inject him with a sample of the serum, making him just as powerful as Godzilla. The two titans battle in the ruins of Yokohama, and Bagan proves to be more challenging than all the other monsters he faced. Eventually, Godzilla bests Bagan, and the aliens retreat, but not before promising revenge. The serum eventually wears off, and Godzilla returns to his original form. The Super X II disables the transmitter, releasing Godzilla from their control, and the mutant dinosaur returns to the ocean with humanity indebted to him for his aide.

== Reception ==
Reception

Review scores
Publication	Score
AllGame	2/5
Electronic Gaming Monthly	7/10, 5/10, 5/10, 7/10
Famitsu	5/10, 5/10, 5/10, 3/10
Super Play	39%
Total!	5+
VideoGames	5/10

Super Godzilla received a 20.5/30 score in a readers' poll conducted by Super Famicom Magazine. The game also garnered a mixed reception from critics. Electronic Gaming Monthly similarly criticized that the map roaming is too slow and boring and the battles are too lacking in interactivity, and additionally complained that frustrating "cheap hits" were too common. GamePro similarly opined that the visuals and sounds "capture the essence of Godzilla movies" but that the gameplay moves too slow, with extensive time spent on a dull map screen culminating in battles which consist mostly of non-interactive cinemas. They concluded the game to be only for hardcore Godzilla fans.

== Unmade Film Adaptation ==
In 1994, Toho planned to adapt the game into a film, where Godzilla teams up with Rodan and Mothra to defeat Bagan, although their combined might fails to do so. As a last ditch effort, Godzilla feeds on radiation and evolves into Super Godzilla, making it an even match. That would later be unused in the film, as Bagan and Rodan would be replaced by M.O.G.U.E.R.A and SpaceGodzilla in the film Godzilla vs SpaceGodzilla. In 1995 it was also planned to introduce Bagan, along with the Gotengo, but was ultimately scrapped.
