= Godzilla: Destroy All Monsters Melee =

2002 video game

- North American Xbox cover art
- Developers: Pipeworks Software; WayForward Technologies (GBA)
- Publisher: Infogrames (Note: Released under the Atari brand name. The remaster is published under Atari as a whole.)
- Director: Matt Bozon (GBA)
- Producer: John Beck (GBA)
- Designers: Armando Soto; Matt Bozon (GBA)
- Programmer: Michael W. Stragey (GBA)
- Artists: Armando Soto; Matt Bozon; Luke Brookshier (GBA)
- Composer: Jake Kaufman (GBA)
- Series: Godzilla
- Platforms: Original; GameCube, Xbox, Game Boy Advance; Remaster; Nintendo Switch, Nintendo Switch 2, PlayStation 5, Windows, Xbox Series X/S
- Release: GameCube: NA: October 15, 2002; PAL: November 15, 2002; Xbox: NA: April 15, 2003; Domination; Game Boy Advance: EU: November 15, 2002; NA: November 19, 2002; AU: November 22, 2002 Remaster; WW: November 3, 2026
- Genre: Fighting
- Modes: Single-player, multiplayer

Godzilla: Destroy All Monsters Melee is a fighting game based on Toho's Godzilla franchise. It was developed by Pipeworks Software and published by Infogrames under the Atari brand for GameCube in 2002.

A companion game developed by WayForward Technologies for Game Boy Advance, Godzilla: Domination!, was released in November of the same year. Destroy All Monsters Melee was later released for Xbox in 2003, featuring additional content and enhanced graphics. It was followed by two sequels, Godzilla: Save the Earth (2004) and Godzilla: Unleashed (2007).

A remastered version was released on November 3, 2026 for Microsoft Windows, PlayStation 5, Xbox Series X, Nintendo Switch and Nintendo Switch 2.

== Gameplay ==
A fight between Godzilla and Megalon

In Godzilla: Destroy All Monsters Melee, players control one of several giant monsters and fight across large, destructible city environments. The game presents a scenario in which aliens have unleashed mutated creatures on Earth, prompting battles between monsters in populated urban areas. Players choose a monster and engage others using hand‑to‑hand attacks, close‑range strikes, special moves, and projectile abilities, all while navigating cityscapes filled with buildings that can be damaged or destroyed during combat. The game offers multiple modes. Adventure Mode serves as the primary single‑player progression, where players fight through a sequence of opponents across different cities. Destruction Mode focuses on causing as much structural damage as possible for points. Melee Mode supports two to four players in battles where monsters respawn, and the winner is determined by score. Survival Mode challenges players to defeat as many monsters as possible using a single health bar. Team Battle divides players into groups for cooperative fights. Each monster has distinct attributes, move sets, and mobility, and additional monsters and stages can be unlocked by completing Adventure Mode with different characters. Environmental interaction plays a significant role: buildings collapse under impact, and human military forces attack monsters during battles. Progression varies in difficulty, with some later encounters presenting steeper challenges. The game’s mechanics emphasize a mix of movement, combat variety, and environmental destruction across its roster of monsters and city arenas.

A total of 11 playable monsters can be unlocked, including Godzilla (90s and 2000), Anguirus, Megalon, Gigan, King Ghidorah, Destoroyah, Rodan, Mecha King Ghidorah, Mechagodzilla 2, and Orga. The Xbox version features an additional 12th monster, Mechagodzilla 3.

== Plot ==
The plot involves an alien race known as the Vortaak invading the Earth and assuming control of the planet's giant monsters, sending them to attack cities across the globe. One monster (the player's character) breaks free from the Vortaak's control, and battles the other monsters in order to drive off the Vortaak.

== Development ==
The game was announced by Infogrames on March 25, 2002, as a GameCube-exclusive, with Pipeworks Software announced as the developer and a release date within the fall of 2002. It was later shown off at E3 2002 and at Infogrames' press event in August.

In January 2003, Infogrames announced that the game would be released for the Xbox with the addition of MechaGodzilla 3 as a new playable character, two new stages, a Destruction Mode for single-player, and graphical upgrades.

== Reception ==
Reception

Aggregate score
Aggregator	Score	
Aggregator	GameCube	Xbox
Metacritic	73/100	71/100

Review scores
Publication	Score	
Publication	GameCube	Xbox
AllGame	3/5	N/A
Electronic Gaming Monthly	7.17/10	6/10
Game Informer	8/10	7.5/10
GamePro	4/5	4/5
GameRevolution	C+	C+
GameSpot	6.9/10	6.4/10
GameSpy	3.5/5	2/5
GameZone	8.1/10	N/A
IGN	8.4/10	8.5/10
Nintendo Power	4/5	N/A
Official Xbox Magazine (US)	N/A	7.9/10
The Cincinnati Enquirer	3.5/5	N/A
Entertainment Weekly	B	N/A

Reception

Aggregate score
Aggregator	Score
OpenCritic	49% recommend(Remastered) (Note: Based on 42 reviews.)

The game received "mixed or average reviews" on all platforms according to video game review aggregator Metacritic.

Entertainment Weekly gave the GameCube version a B and stated that the game's biggest blunder "is that it just isn't campy enough." However, The Cincinnati Enquirer gave the same version three-and-a-half stars out of five and stated that "while the game has a variety of game-play modes, they aren't very deep once you've mastered the basics." The Village Voice also gave the Xbox version a score of 7 out of 10 and stated that "When buildings light up—Big Ben, say—you can let your opponents know what time it is by picking up the structure and hurling it at them." During the 6th Annual Interactive Achievement Awards, the Academy of Interactive Arts & Sciences nominated Godzilla for "Console Fighting Game of the Year", which it ultimately lost to Tekken 4.

The game grossed over $15 million in the United States.

== Remastered version ==
A remastered version titled Godzilla: Destroy All Monsters Melee Remastered was announced on June 6, 2026, and released on November 3, 2026 for Microsoft Windows, PlayStation 5, Xbox Series X and Nintendo Switch 2 to coincide with Godzilla Day. Rather than port the original game, Pipeworks rebuilt it with Unreal Engine 5 while maintaining a majority of the mechanics of the original. The remaster also features an updated unlock system and adds online multiplayer functionality. Like the Xbox version, Remastered features 12 playable monsters, though Mechagodzilla 2 has been replaced by the original Mechagodzilla. While initially announced only for the above platforms, a Nintendo Switch version was also released on the same day.
