= The Last Dinosaur =

- Japanese theatrical release poster
- Written by: William Overgard
- Directed by: Alexander Grasshoff; Tsugunobu Kotani
- Starring: Richard Boone; Joan Van Ark; Steven Keats
- Music by: Maury Laws
- Countries of origin: Japan; United States
- Original languages: English; Japanese

Production
- Producers: Arthur Rankin, Jr. Jules Bass; Noboru Tsuburaya
- Cinematography: Shoji Ueda
- Editors: Minoru Kozono; Yoshitami Kuroiwa; Tatsuji Nakashizu
- Running time: 106 minutes (Japan); 92 minutes (U.S.)
- Production companies: Rankin/Bass; Tsuburaya Productions

Original release
- Release: February 11, 1977

The Last Dinosaur (Japanese: 極底探険船ポーラーボーラ, Hepburn: Kyokutei Tankensen Pōrābōra; lit. 'Polar Probe Ship: Polar Borer') is a 1977 tokusatsu film co-directed by Alexander Grasshoff and Tsugunobu Kotani (billed as Tom Kotani). A Japanese-American co-production between Tsuburaya Productions and Rankin/Bass Productions, it was filmed at Tsuburaya Studios in Tokyo and on location in the Japanese Alps.

The film was intended for a U.S. theatrical release, but failed to find a distributor and ended up as a television film, airing on ABC on February 11, 1977 in an edited 92-minute run time. The film was eventually picked up for overseas markets by Cinema International Corporation, where it was released in the unedited 106-minute version as a double feature in the U.K. with the edited version of Sorcerer (the latter considered a remake of The Wages of Fear). Toho also picked up distribution rights to The Last Dinosaur in Japan for a theatrical release utilizing the unedited 106-minute version in English with Japanese subtitles, and later the film debuted on Japanese television dubbed in Japanese.

The film stars Richard Boone and Joan Van Ark. William Overgard wrote the screenplay. The score was composed, as was most of the music for all Rankin/Bass specials and series, by Maury Laws, while the title song "He's the Last Dinosaur", with lyrics by Jules Bass, was sung by Nancy Wilson, and arranged and conducted by Bernard Hoffer.

== Plot ==
Wealthy big-game hunter Maston Thrust Jr. has a multimillion-dollar company, Thrust Inc., which drills for oil under the polar caps with a human-operated laser drill called the "Polar Borer". Following one expedition, only one man, geologist Chuck Wade, returns; he explains that the drill was going through a routine check in the icecaps when it surfaced into a valley super-heated by a volcano. When the crew, except for Wade, began exploring the area, they were killed by a Tyrannosaurus rex. Maston decides to go there himself to study the creature. He brings with him Wade; Bunta, a Maasai tracker; Dr. Kawamoto; and Frankie Banks, a Pulitzer Prize-winning photographer selected by the press pool. Matson is initially unwilling to let Frankie join the crew, but she manages to convince him to allow her on the expedition by seducing him.

Upon arriving at the isolated valley using the Polar Borer, the group notices Pteranodons. Once they raft to shore, they narrowly avoid being trampled by a Uintatherium. After setting up camp, Maston, Wade, Bunta, and Frankie go out looking for the Tyrannosaurus, while Kawamoto remains at the camp. The party encounters the Tyrannosaurus and narrowly escapes from it. Later, the Tyrannosaurus finds the camp, destroying it and killing Kawamoto. It then takes the Polar Borer and throws it into a canyon full of bones. He uses the Borer to dig a canyon wall and releases a Triceratops, and the two dinosaurs clash. After a fierce battle, the Tyrannosaurus kills the Triceratops.

The group returns to the destroyed camp and notices Kawamoto and Polar Borer have disappeared. Enraged, Maston vows to kill the dinosaur. After a few months pass, the group is now living in a cave and has a number of encounters with cavemen in the area, but are able to turn them away with a handmade crossbow. They also befriend a cavewoman, who they name Hazel. While Hazel helps Frankie wash her hair, the Tyrannosaurus returns. Frankie takes refuge in a cave, with the Tyrannosaurus trying to get in. Maston, Bunta, and Wade are able to turn it away with a large boulder tied to its tail. Maston decides to kill the Tyrannosaurus once and for all with a catapult.

After building the catapult, they wait for the dinosaur. Out hunting, Wade finds the Polar Borer and realizes it is still operable. However, Maston refuses to leave, wanting to kill the Tyrannosaurus. Wade and Frankie leave the camp to get the Borer fixed and then leave, while Maston and Bunta remain. Once the Borer is launched back in the water, Frankie goes back to convince the others to leave with them one last time. Bunta is killed by the Tyrannosaurus while stalking him. Frankie reunites with Maston and helps him use the catapult on the Tyrannosaurus. But the dinosaur soon gets back to its feet and destroys the catapult.

In the wake of the destruction, Wade arrives and states that they have to leave now or they will be trapped in the valley. Frankie pleads with Maston to go with them and to leave the Tyrannosaurus as it is the "last one", Maston replies "So am I".

Wade and Frankie then leave aboard the Polar Borer, leaving Maston in the valley with Hazel.

== Cast ==
- Richard Boone as Maston Thrust Jr.
- Joan Van Ark as Francesca 'Frankie' Banks
- Steven Keats as Chuck Wade
- Luther Rackley as Bunta
- Masumi Sekiya as Hazel (cavewoman)
- William Ross as Hal (Mother 1 chief technician)
- Carl Hansen as Barney
- Tetsu Nakamura as Dr. Kawamoto
- Nancy Magsig as Thrust's girl on plane
- Don Maloney as Mother 1 captain
- Vanessa Cristina as reporter
- James Dale
- Hyoe Enoki
- Shunsuke Kariya as caveman leader
- Gary Gundassen
- Toru Kawai as the Tyrannosaurus
- Tatsumi Nikamoto as the Triceratops (front end)

== Production ==
=== Writing ===
The film was intended for a US theatrical release, but failed to find a distributor and ended up as a television film. Screenwriter William Overgard pitched to ABC a TV movie about a hunter who travels back in time to kill a dinosaur. ABC rejected the idea in favor of a rock musical remake of King Kong. When that fell though, they came back to Overgard to develop his idea.

=== Filming ===
While the film featured mostly an English-speaking cast, a Japanese dub was created for the television release in Japan. The Japanese theatrical release, as well as the Japanese laserdisc release, used the English voice cast with Japanese subtitles.

=== Creature design ===
Unlike other bigger-budgeted movies that have used state-of-the-art effects (i.e., stop motion, puppets, etc.) for the dinosaurs, this movie uses the "man in a suit" method, much like the Godzilla movies of the 1960s and 1970s (the sound department even borrowed Godzilla's trademark roar and occasionally mixed it into the T. rex's roar). The "ceratopsian" (Uintatherium), as well as the Triceratops, were done through the "two guys in a horse-suit" technique. The scale (size) of the Tyrannosaurus also changes liberally from scene to scene, in some cases it appears to be over 40–50 feet tall (when it attacks the borer) and can carry it in its mouth, when the Polar Borer is easily well over 10 feet in diameter. However, they do correctly state in the beginning of the movie that a Tyrannosaurus rex is 20 feet high and 40 feet long.

The Tyrannosaurus suit was created by Tsuburaya Production, portrayed by Toru Kawai, who played Godzilla in Zone Fighter and Terror of Mechagodzilla. The T. rex suit was later used for Ururu of the tokusatsu/anime combination TV series Dinosaur War Izenborg.

The front end of the Triceratops suit was portrayed by Tatsumi Nikamoto, who acted opposite Kawai as Zone Fighter and Titanosaurus in the two works, respectively.

== Home video ==
On May 22, 2009, Toho Video released the movie on DVD for the first time anywhere in the world. The DVD contains both English and Japanese audio tracks as well as an audio commentary in Japanese. This release uses an anamorphic 1.78:1 widescreen transfer of the unedited 106-minute theatrical release prepared by U.S. rights holder Warner Bros., and also contains a 13-minute interview with visual effects director Kazuo Sagawa, a photo gallery (which includes storyboards, production designs, and behind-the-scenes photos), a 15-minute behind-the-scenes production reel narrated by Sagawa, and the original Japanese theatrical release trailer.

On March 22, 2011, Warner Home Video released the movie on DVD in the U.S. through their Warner Archive Collection as a "made to order" DVD. This release uses the same widescreen transfer of the 106-minute unedited version as the Japanese Toho release, but lacks the supplemental materials.

== See also ==
- Journey to the Beginning of Time (1955)
- List of films featuring dinosaurs
