= Godzilla (Shōwa) =

Fictional monster, or kaiju

Godzilla (Shōwa era)
- Godzilla character
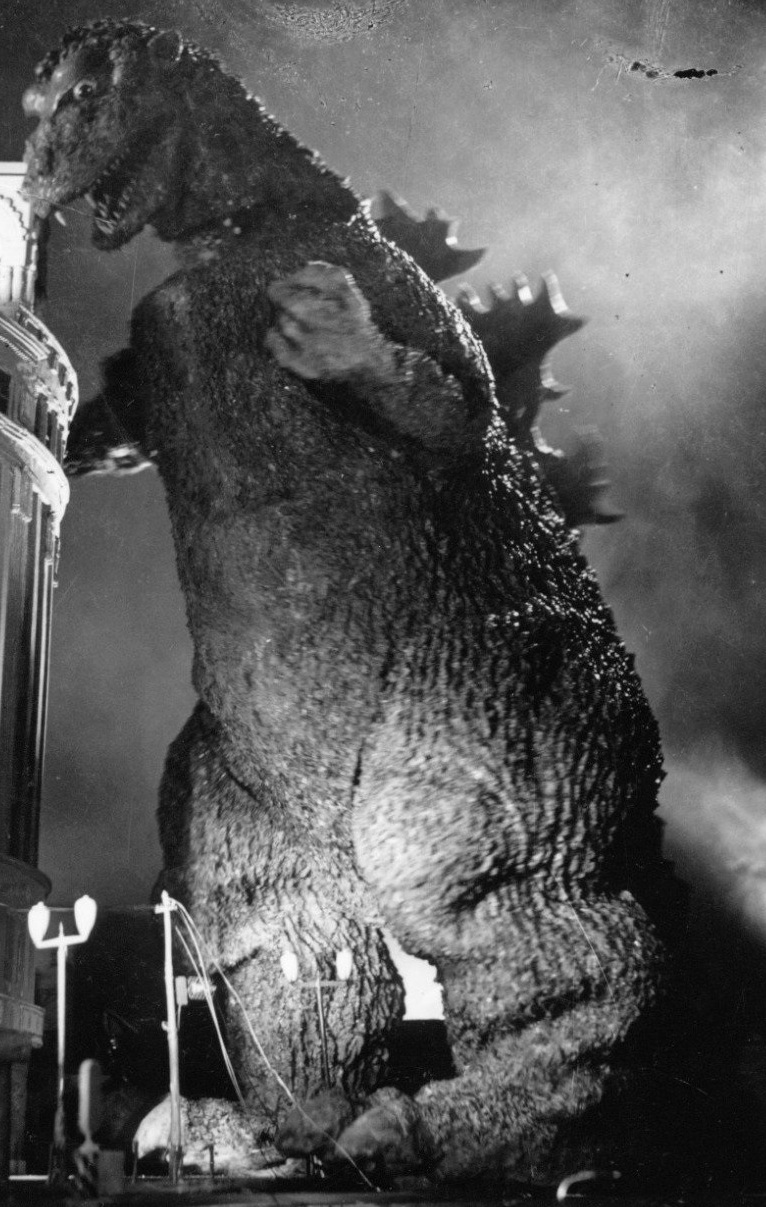
- Godzilla as portrayed by Haruo Nakajima via suitmation in the 1954 film.
- First appearance: Godzilla (1954)
- Last appearance: Terror of Mechagodzilla (1975)
- Created by: Tomoyuki Tanaka; Eiji Tsuburaya (Note: During a 2010 dispute with Honda's family over Godzilla's copyright ownership, Toho credited Tanaka and Kayama alone as the character's "authors".); Ishirō Honda; Shigeru Kayama
- Portrayed by: Haruo Nakajima; Katsumi Tezuka; Seiji Ōnaka; Hiroshi Sekita; Shinji Takagi; Isao Zushi; Toru Kawai; Tsutomu Kitagawa
- Voiced by: Ted Thomas (Note: Only in the English dub of Godzilla vs. Gigan (1972))

In-universe information
- Aliases: Gigantis (Note: For the American release of Godzilla Raids Again, the film was localized and released as Gigantis, the Fire Monster. Producer Paul Schreibman chose to rename Godzilla as "Gigantis" in an attempt to pass off the second Godzilla as a new character after the first Godzilla died in the previous film.); Monster Zero-One (Note: As depicted in Invasion of Astro Monster); Kiryu (Note: The version of Mechagodzilla featured in Godzilla Against Mechagodzilla and its sequel Godzilla: Tokyo S.O.S. is constructed from the bones of the 1954 Godzilla.)

Godzilla (Japanese: ゴジラ, Hepburn: Gojira) is a giant monster, or kaiju, that originated from the Godzilla franchise owned by Toho Co., Ltd.. The Shōwa era iteration of the character debuted in the 1954 film Godzilla, the first entry in the franchise, depicted as a prehistoric reptile awakened by hydrogen bomb testing which wreaks havoc on nearby Tokyo. The first Godzilla is killed, however, a second Godzilla appears in the 1955 film Godzilla Raids Again.

The character was depicted through suitmation, mainly portrayed by Japanese stunt actor Haruo Nakajima from 1954 to his retirement in 1972; other stunt actors had also performed as Godzilla during Nakajima's tenure. The direction of Godzilla's character changes as the Shōwa-era films progress, beginning as an antagonist, gradually becoming an anti-hero, and ultimately a hero of the planet — occasionally forming alliances with various kaiju.

== Development and design ==
=== First iteration (1954) ===
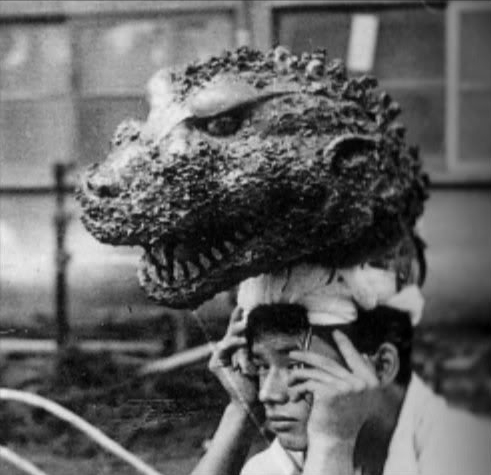
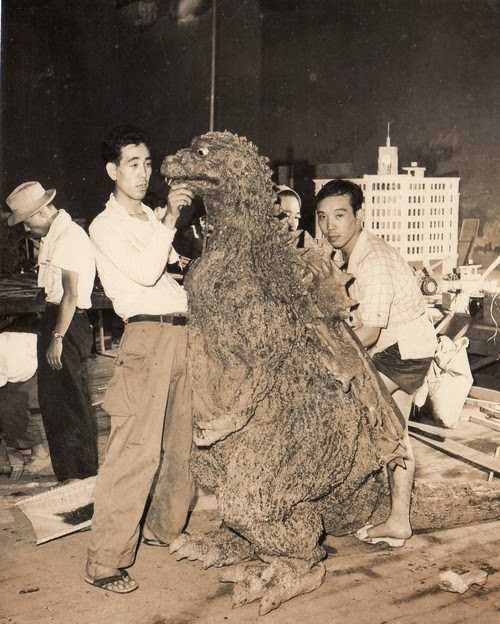
The '54 Godzilla suit was produced with rough materials, resulting in a heavy suit, limiting Haruo Nakajima to three minutes of use before passing out from heat exhaustion.

Manga illustrator Wasuke Abe was lead designer behind the 1954 version of Godzilla. His initial idea was a humanoid beast with a head shaped like a mushroom cloud.

While designing the monster, art director Akira Watanabe and sculptor Teizo Toshimitsu decided to combine the characteristics of a Iguanodon, Stegosaurus, and a Tyrannosaurus rex, taking inspiration from a 1953 issue of Life magazine and a dinosaur book for children. Toshimitsu sculpted three concept marquettes of Godzilla: one with fish-like scales, another had wart-like bumps, and one with skin inspired by crocodiles and other reptiles. Watanabe rejected the first two concepts, explaining that they lacked the necessary power, and approved the third concept. Special effects director Eiji Tsuburaya planned to bring Godzilla to life using stop-motion, but had insufficient time due to the scheduled release of the film in November 1954, and Tsuburaya decided to use a man in a suit in miniature sets of Tokyo, later known as "Suitmation".

The top and bottom halves of the suit were later reused, to depict close-ups of Godzilla's feet, and the upper half used for other close-ups. A second suit was also created. A 50-centimetre (500-millimetre; 0.50-metre; 20-inch; 1.6-foot) miniature was employed to depict Godzilla's skeleton. In 2002, during production of Godzilla Against Mechagodzilla, Toho made a replica of the 1954 Godzilla suit's upper half, modelled by Shinichi Wakasa; it was used in the flashback scene, worn by Millennium Godzilla suit actor Tsutomu Kitagawa. Godzilla's skeleton was also recreated for the film.

=== Other iterations (1955-1975) ===
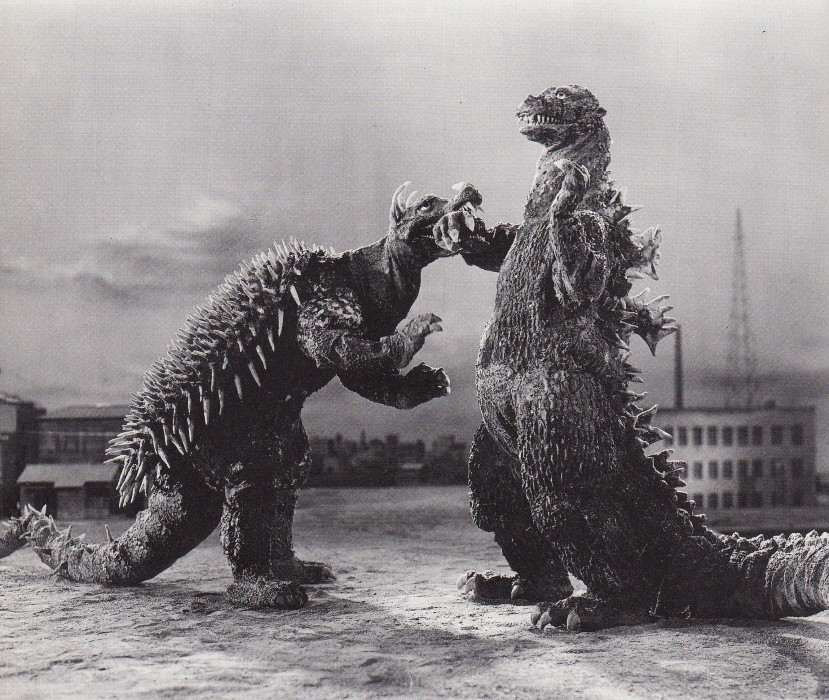
In Godzilla Raids Again (1955), a second Godzilla emerges seemingly to battle the new monster Anguirus. Unlike the '54 suit, the new suits were made with lighter materials and plaster molds to fit suit performers Nakajima and Katsumi Tezuka, resulting in more fluid movements.

Godzilla's design changed repeatedly between 1955 and 1975. The design for Godzilla Raids Again (1955) had a slimmer build and a smaller head. The design addressed the need for flexibility to battle Anguirus in the film. A separate set of legs, worn like boots, was used for close-up shots of Godzilla's feet and lower legs. As with the 1954 Godzilla design, a hand-operated puppet was used for close-ups of the monster's face. This puppet features teeth that protruded outward from the mouth and movable eyes, features not shared by the suit.

The Godzilla design from the 1962 film King Kong vs. Godzilla had major changes that distinguished it from his design in 1955. The suit was very stocky and more reptilian, with a thicker lower half. The head was made smaller and streamlined, with human-like eyes placed on its sides in a reptilian fashion. The design had larger hands, spike-like claws, and thumbs nearly as large as his other fingers. This suit design was recreated for the 1983 fan film Legendary Beast Wolfman vs. Godzilla. In Mothra vs. Godzilla (1964), the body of Godzilla was sleek and bell-shaped, with a pronounced sternum and knees. The hands featured slender, sharp claws with spread fingers. The dorsal plates were nearly identical to his suit from 1962. The facial features were defined, with pronounced brows and large, angry-looking eyes.

In Ghidorah, the Three-Headed Monster (1964), Godzilla was given a new head with movable eyes, reduced upper lip and teeth, and elongated tongue. These changes were due to damage the suit's head had sustained during the previous film, primarily during the scenes where Godzilla smashed headfirst into Nagoya Castle, and when his head is briefly set on fire. In Invasion of Astro-Monster (1965), Godzilla was given a head slightly larger than that of the suit from 1964, with a round face and jaws. The torso is thinner and proportionally smaller than the rest of the body compared to previous suits. This suit would be reused again in the 1966 film Ebirah, Horror of the Deep.

In Son of Godzilla (1967), Godzilla was given a somewhat human-like head with big, high-set eyes, heavy lids and a stubby nose, which was done to make the suit more closely resemble Minilla. Godzilla's overall look was changed to still look intimidating, but at the same time look like a father figure. A much longer and thicker neck was given to this Godzilla, to try and make him look much taller than his son. This suit was used again in the film Godzilla vs. Gigan for the film's swimming scenes. When this suit was used in scenes where Godzilla was sitting, parts of the suit's legs appeared to concertina inwards, making the suit's legs look stumpy.

For the films in Destroy All Monsters (1968) and Godzilla vs. Gigan (1972), Godzilla had been given a bell-shaped body with a pronounced breast bone, a long neck and a head somewhat similar to the suit from 1965 and 1966, with defined brows and more menacing eyes than the previous suits. Nkajima would retire from suit acting after Godzilla vs. Gigan.

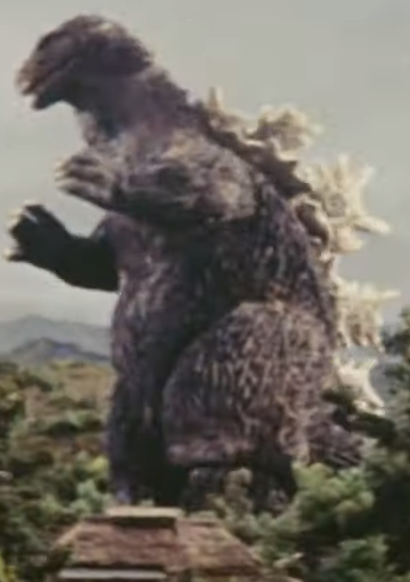
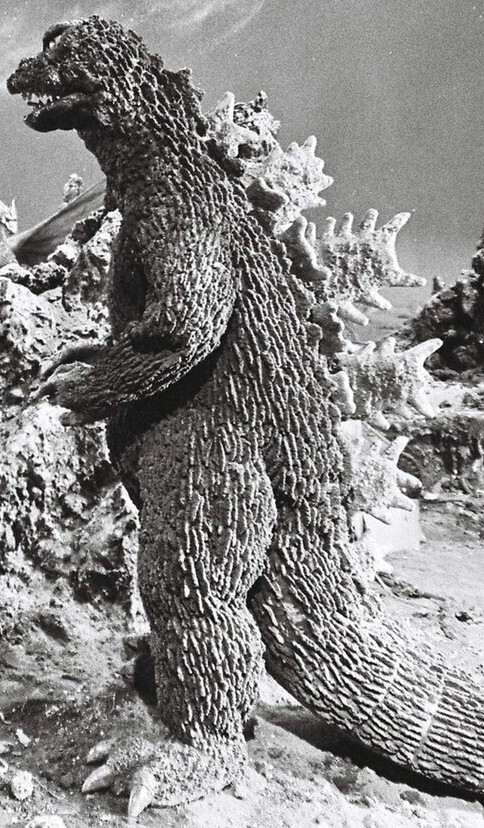
Godzilla, as portrayed by Haruo Nakajima in King Kong vs. Godzilla (left) and Invasion of Astro-Monster (middle); Shinji Takagi portrayed the character in Godzilla vs. Megalon (right), taking over after Nakajima's retirement. Godzilla's designs and suits have gone through numerous changes during the Shōwa era.

In Godzilla vs. Megalon (1973), Shinji Takagi took over the role of Godzilla after Nakajima's retirement. Godzilla had a plain, streamlined body, a short neck and silver, puffy, pillow-like designed dorsal plates. The face looks more friendly than usual, with a rounded muzzle, oversized brows and huge eyes. The eyes of Godzilla were movable and had movable eyelids. Compared to other Godzilla designs, this suit also had a more upright stance than previous suits, a characteristic that would be kept for the Godzilla suits made in the Heisei era. In Godzilla vs. Mechagodzilla (1974), Godzilla remained mostly the same but with some minor changes to the face; with more detail added in the muzzle and the brows being reduced in size, making this Godzilla suit look less playful than in 1973. The eyes did not move nor did they have movable eyelids. A second suit was used for Mechagodzilla's "Fake Godzilla" disguise.

In Terror of Mechagodzilla (1975), Godzilla had a further face lift; the muzzle was reduced and given more detail, the height of the brows were lowered and the eyes were reduced, thus giving the face a semi-comical and semi-mean look. Like the previous suit, the eyes did not move nor possessed movable eyelids, and the rest of the body was unchanged.

=== Roar ===
When composer Akira Ifukube first joined the Godzilla project, he thought that the monster, being a reptile, should not roar at all. The director, Ishirō Honda, explained that the monster's ability to roar was another consequence of the mutation. Sound technicians tried modifying the cries of lions, night herons, and tigers, which failed to fit the monster. Ifukube eventually picked contrabass to create the roar. He slackened the E-string and recorded his assistant, Sei Ikano, drawing his hands across it with a leather glove covered in pine tar, and then slowed down the roar during post-production.

During the editing of Gigantis, the Fire Monster, Godzilla's roar was largely replaced with Anguirus' roar.

== Appearances ==
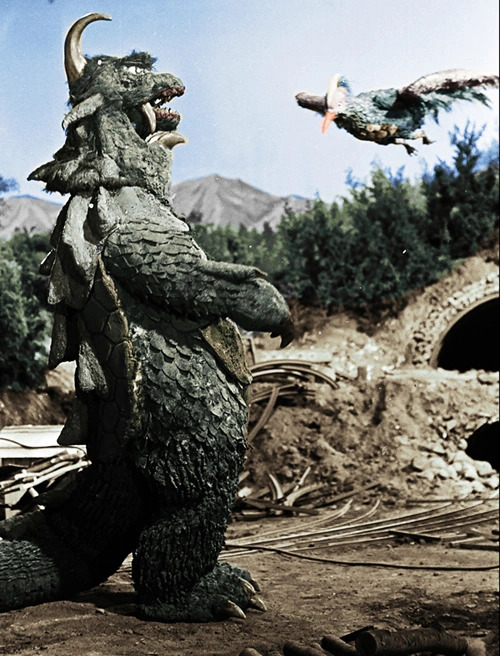
Two Godzilla suits were borrowed by Tsuburaya Productions and refurbished for the characters Gomess in Ultra Q (left) and Jirahs in Ultraman (right)

In 1966, the Godzilla suit used for Mothra vs. Godzilla and Ghidorah, the Three-Headed Monster was reused to depict the kaiju Gomess for Ultra Q episode 1 "Defeat Gomess!".

During the shooting of Ebirah, Horror of the Deep, Tsuburaya Productions asked to borrow the head of a Godzilla suit for usage in the Ultraman television series. This was because the head of the previous Godzilla suit could not be used, as it had already been modified to portray the monster Gomess in Ultra Q. Toho approved the request and the head from the 1965 Godzilla suit was removed, and grafted onto the body of another Godzilla suit. Both parts of the two separate Godzilla suits were then repainted in green with yellow stripes, and a frill was added around the completed suit's neck to create the monster Jirahs.

=== Films ===
- Godzilla (1954)
  - Godzilla, King of the Monsters! (1956)
- Godzilla Raids Again (1955)
  - Gigantis, the Fire Monster (1959) — as Gigantis
- King Kong vs. Godzilla (1962)
- Mothra vs. Godzilla (1964)
- Ghidorah, the Three-Headed Monster (1964)
- Invasion of Astro-Monster (1965)
- Ebirah, Horror of the Deep (1966)
- Son of Godzilla (1967)
- Destroy All Monsters (1968)
- All Monsters Attack (1969)
- Godzilla vs. Hedorah (1971)
- Godzilla vs. Gigan (1972)
- Godzilla vs. Megalon (1973)
- Godzilla vs. Mechagodzilla (1974)
- Terror of Mechagodzilla (1975)

=== TV series ===
- Ultra Q (1966) - episode 1, as Gomess.
- Zone Fighter (1973) - episodes 4, 11, 15, 21, and 25
- Godzilla Tales (2020, stock footage) - episodes 1, 2, 3, 4, 8, 10, 12, 13, 16
- Chibi Godzilla Raids Again (2024, illustrations) - episode 45

=== Video games ===
- Godzilla (1993)
- Godzilla (1993)
- Godzilla: Giant Monster March (1995)
- Godzilla Movie Studio Tour (1996)
- Godzilla: Trading Battle (1998)
- Godzilla: Destroy All Monsters Melee (2002) — as Mechagodzilla 3/Kiryu
- Godzilla: Unleashed (2007) — as Godzilla 1954 and Mechagodzilla/Kiryu
- Godzilla (2014) — as Godzilla 1964 and Kiryu
- Godzilla Kaiju Collection (2015)
- Godzilla Defense Force (2019)
- Godzilla Battle Line (2021)

== Public displays ==
A statue of the first Godzilla was installed at the "Godzilla The Art" exhibition at Shibuya PARCO in Shibuya, Tokyo, and Another one was installed at the Godzilla Expo in Sapporo, Hokkaido, Japan. A golden statue of Godzilla was installed at the Daimaru Matsuzakaya Department Store in Nagoya, Chūbu for the Great Golden Exhibition. A large statue of Godzilla's upper body was installed at Hibya as a way of promoting the 2023 film Godzilla Minus One.

A statue of the 1955 Godzilla was placed on display at Shinsaibashi station in Osaka to promote the opening of the Godzilla Store. The head of Godzilla from the 1968 suit, which was used in Destroy All Monsters (1968) through Godzilla vs. Gigan (1972), was placed on static display at Nihon Engineering College right next to the Kamata station.

Toho made a full-body replica of the first Godzilla, which debuted at G-Fest in 2018 at Hibiya, Chiyoda, Tokyo. Yuji Sakai led the team that worked on the replica of the original suit, which had made an appearance in a short film made for the Eiji Tsuburaya Museum.

== See also ==
- Godzilla (Heisei)
- Shin Godzilla (character)
- Godzilla (Takashi Yamazaki)

== Bibliography ==
- Tanaka, Tomoyuki (1996). Definitive Edition Godzilla Introduction (14th ed.). Shogakukan. ISBN 4092201427.
- Ryfle, Steve (1998). Japan's Favorite Mon-star: The Unauthorized Biography of "The Big G". ECW Press. ISBN 9781550223484.
- Solomon, Brian (2000). Godzilla FAQ: All That's Left to Know About the King of the Monsters. Bloomsbury Publishing USA. ISBN 9798216341994.
- Matthews, Melvin E. (2007). 1950s Science Fiction Films and 9/11: Hostile Aliens, Hollywood, and Today's News. Algora Publishing. ISBN 9780875864990.
- Ragone, August (2007). Eiji Tsuburaya: Master of Monsters. Chronicle Books. ISBN 9780811860789.
- Senn, Bryan (2015). A Year of Fear: A Day-by-Day Guide to 366 Horror Films. McFarland. ISBN 9781476610900.
- Edwards, Matthew (2018). The Atomic Bomb in Japanese Cinema: Critical Essays. McFarland. ISBN 9781476620206.
- Brykczynski, Ben (2019). Godzilla: A Comprehensive Guide. Ben Brykczynski.
- Barr, Jason (2023). The Kaiju Connection: Giant Monsters and Ourselves. McFarland. ISBN 9781476693514.
- Roswell, Faith (2024). Movie Monsters of the Deep. White Owl. ISBN 9781399052979.
- Ryfle, Steve; Godziszewski, Ed (2025). Godzilla: The First 70 Years - The Official Illustrated History of the Japanese Productions. Abrams Books. ISBN 978-1419762116.
