= Terror of Mechagodzilla =

1975 film by Ishirō Honda

- Theatrical release poster

Japanese name
- Kanji: メカゴジラの逆襲
Transcriptions
- Revised Hepburn: mekagojira no gyakushuu
- Directed by: Ishirō Honda
- Written by: Yukiko Takayama
- Produced by: Tomoyuki Tanaka; Henry G. Saperstein
- Starring: Katsuhiko Sasaki; Tomoko Ai; Akihiko Hirata; Katsumasa Uchida; Gorō Mutsumi; Tadao Nakamaru; Toru Kawai
- Cinematography: Sokei Tomioka
- Edited by: Yoshitami Kuroiwa
- Music by: Akira Ifukube
- Production company: Toho–Eizo
- Distributed by: Toho
- Release date: March 15, 1975
- Running time: 83 minutes
- Language: Japanese
- Budget: $1.2 million
- Box office: ¥330 million (Japan rentals) <$20 million (worldwide)

Terror of Mechagodzilla (メカゴジラの逆襲, Mekagojira no Gyakushū; lit. 'Mechagodzilla's Counterattack') is a 1975 Japanese kaiju film directed by Ishirō Honda, written by Yukiko Takayama, and produced by Tomoyuki Tanaka and Henry G. Saperstein, with special effects by Teruyoshi Nakano. Distributed by Toho and produced under their effects subsidiary Toho–Eizo, it is the 15th film in the Godzilla franchise, serving as a direct sequel to the 1974 film Godzilla vs. Mechagodzilla and the final entry of the franchise's Shōwa era and the last to be directed by series co-creator Ishirō Honda before his death in 1993. The franchise would be rebooted nine years later with The Return of Godzilla, beginning the franchise's Heisei era.

Terror of Mechagodzilla stars Katsuhiko Sasaki, Tomoko Ai, Akihiko Hirata, and Gorō Mutsumi, and features Toru Kawai, Kazunari Mori, and Tatsumi Nikamoto as the fictional monster characters Godzilla, Mechagodzilla 2, and Titanosaurus, respectively. The film was released theatrically in Japan on March 15, 1975, to mostly positive reviews. It was released in the UK in June 1976 under the title Monsters From an Unknown Planet. It received a limited release in the United States in 1978 by Bob Conn Enterprises under the title The Terror of Godzilla. The film remains the least financially successful entry in the Godzilla franchise to this day.

== Plot ==
Following Mechagodzilla's and the Simeons' defeat by Godzilla and Okinawan guardian monster King Caesar, (Note: As depicted in Godzilla vs. Mechagodzilla (1974).) Interpol agents search for Mechagodzilla's remains at the bottom of the Okinawan Sea in the hopes of gathering information on the Simeons. Their submarine is attacked by a giant marine dinosaur they name Titanosaurus and the crew vanishes.

Interpol launches an investigation into the incident. With the help of marine biologist Akira Ichinose, they trace Titanosaurus to a reclusive mad scientist named Shinzô Mafune, who wants to destroy mankind. While the group visits Mafune's home, they meet his daughter, Katsura, who secretly underwent surgery and became a cyborg after she was injured during one of her father's experiments. Katsura claims her father is dead and that she burned his notes about Titanosaurus. Mafune is visited by Tsuda, an aide to the Simeon supreme leader Mugal, who is leading a project to rebuild Mechagodzilla into Mechagodzilla 2. Mugal offers the Simeons' services to Mafune so that their respective monsters can wipe out mankind. A control device for Mechagodzilla 2 is implanted into Katsura.

Ichinose falls in love with Katsura and unwittingly gives her Interpol's information on the Simeons, Mechagodzilla, and Titanosaurus. An impatient Mafune releases Titanosaurus on Yokosuka without the Simeons' permission. While Interpol discovers Titanosaurus is vulnerable to supersonic waves, Katsura destroys their supersonic wave oscillator. Godzilla arrives and easily defeats Titanosaurus, causing the latter to retreat.

When Ichinose visits Katsura, the Simeons capture him and unleash Mechagodzilla 2 and Titanosaurus on Tokyo. Interpol repairs their wave oscillator and the Japanese armed forces struggle to fend off the monsters. Godzilla arrives but is outmatched until Interpol distracts Titanosaurus with the repaired wave oscillator, allowing Godzilla to focus on Mechagodzilla 2. Interpol agents infiltrate the Simeons' hideout, rescue Ichinose, and kill Mafune and many of the Simeons. The remaining Simeons attempt to escape, but Godzilla shoots down their ships with atomic breath. The wounded Katsura shoots herself to disable Mechagodzilla 2's control device. Godzilla destroys Mechagodzilla 2, but Katsura dies in Ichinose's arms. With help from Interpol, Godzilla defeats Titanosaurus and returns to the ocean.

== Cast ==
- Katsuhiko Sasaki as Akira Ichinose
- Tomoko Ai as Katsura Mafune
- Akihiko Hirata as Dr. Shinzo Mafune
- Katsumasa Uchida as Jiro Murakoshi, Interpol Agent
- Gorō Mutsumi as Mugal, Black Hole Alien supreme leader. Mutsumi previously portrayed Kuronuma in the previous film.
- Toru Ibuki as Tsuda, Black Hole Alien lieutenant
- Kenji Sahara as Commander Segawa
- Tadao Nakamaru as Chief of Interpol Tagawa
- Akinori Umezu as Ken-chan
- Toru Kawai as Godzilla
- Kazunari Mori as Mechagodzilla 2
- Tatsumi Fuyamoto as Titanosaurus

== Production ==
=== Development ===
A Shinto priest performs a purification ceremony prior to the start of filming

The original screenplay that Yukiko Takayama created after winning Toho's story contest for the next installment in the Godzilla series was picked by assistant producer Kenji Tokoro and was submitted for approval on July 1, 1974, less than four months after Godzilla vs. Mechagodzilla was released.

The original concept is similar to the finished version of Terror of Mechagodzilla, with many of the changes being budgetary in nature. The most obvious alteration is the removal of the two dinosaurs called the Titans, which merged to become Titanosaurus in the first draft. It was an interesting concept, although something that was also under-explained, considering the magnitude of such an occurrence of the creatures merging. Another noticeable change to the script is that of the final battle, which does not move to the countryside but instead would have reduced Tokyo to rubble during the ensuing conflict between the three monsters.

After her initial draft, Takayama submitted a revised version on October 14, 1974. This went through a third revision on December 4, and then yet another on December 28 of that same year before it was met with approval and filming began.

Jun Fukuda was initially offered the role of director for this installment but refused having finally had enough of the series. Before Ishiro Honda agreed to return rumours persist Yoshimitsu Banno was also asked to direct due to Tomoyuki Tanaka being pleased with his work on Prophecies of Nostradamus.

Director Ishiro Honda later lamented not having been able to work with the story's writer, Yukiko Takayama, on other films, enjoying that a "woman's perspective was especially fresh" for the genre.

Kensho Yamashita, who would later direct Godzilla vs. SpaceGodzilla was the chief assistant director on the project. He notes, though, that Honda never actually assigned any of the shooting to him, possibly because he was happy to be directing again after a long gap in his career and wanted to do the work himself.

=== Nudity ===
This film is one of two Godzilla films with brief nudity (the other being 1994's Godzilla vs. SpaceGodzilla). The scene occurs when Katsura undergoes an operation to have Mechagodzilla 2's control device placed inside her body, at which point her breasts are exposed. While she was portrayed by a mannequin in the scene, the scene was cut when the film was released in the U.S., both from the theatrical and TV versions of the film, and was also missing from the UK theatrical version, though the scene was intact in the 1992 VHS release which used the Terror of Mechagodzilla title.

== English version ==
Bob Conn Enterprises' theatrical poster for the 1978 U.S. release of The Terror of Godzilla. The images of the monsters come from a promotional still for Godzilla vs. Mechagodzilla.

Toho titled its English version of the film Terror of Mechagodzilla and had it dubbed into English in Hong Kong. This "international version" has never seen wide release in the United States, but has been issued on VHS in the United Kingdom by PolyGram Video Ltd. and on DVD in Taiwan by Power Multimedia.

The film was given a North American theatrical release in March 1978 by independent distributor Bob Conn Enterprises under the title The Terror of Godzilla. Just as Cinema Shares had done with the previous three Godzilla movies, Bob Conn Enterprises chose to utilize the Toho-commissioned English dub instead of hiring a new crew to re-dub the film. The Terror of Godzilla was heavily edited to obtain a "G" rating from the MPAA. Several scenes with violent content were entirely removed, disrupting the flow of the narrative.

Henry G. Saperstein, who sold the theatrical rights to Bob Conn Enterprises, also released the film to television in late 1978, this time under Toho's international title, Terror of Mechagodzilla. Unlike The Terror of Godzilla, the television version remained mostly uncut, with only the shot of Katsura's naked breasts excised. Saperstein's editors also added a 10-minute prologue that served as a brief history of Godzilla, with footage from Saperstein's English versions of Invasion of Astro-Monster and All Monsters Attack (the latter of which utilized stock footage from both Ebirah, Horror of the Deep and Son of Godzilla).

In the mid-1980s, the U.S. television version, Terror of Mechagodzilla, was replaced by the theatrical edit, The Terror of Godzilla, on television and home video. For some reason, the title was also changed to Terror of Mechagodzilla. The 1994 Paramount release of Terror of Mechagodzilla listed a running time of 89 minutes on the slipcase, implying that this release would be the longer version first shown on American TV. The actual video cassette featured the edited theatrical version. In a 1995 interview with G-Fan magazine, Saperstein was surprised to hear about this mistake. In 1997 on Channel 4 in the U.K., three Godzilla movies were shown back to back late at night, starting with Godzilla vs. Megalon, Godzilla vs. Gigan and then Terror of Mechagodzilla; all were dubbed versions. This showing was uncut, including the Katsura nudity scene, but it did not have the Western-made prologue.

In the mid-2000s, the television version showed up again on Monsters HD, and in 2007, it made its home video debut as the U.S. version on the Classic Media DVD. Although the added prologue was originally framed for fullscreen television, it was cropped and shown in widescreen on the disc. The rest of the movie featured the audio from Saperstein's television version synced to the video from the Japanese version.

The first article about the movie's storyline was published in Japanese Giants #4 in 1977, edited and published by Bradford G. Boyle, and was written by Richard H. Campbell, creator of The Godzilla Fan News Letter (a.k.a. "The Gang").

== Reception ==
=== Critical response ===
On American Rotten Tomatoes, approval rating of 43% based on 7 reviews, with a rating average of 6/10."

=== Box office ===
In Japan, the film sold 980,000 tickets. Despite earning mixed, though generally positive reviews, it sold poorly; the film was the least-attended Godzilla film in Japan and also one of only two Godzilla films to sell less than 1 million tickets. The film's poor performance was part of a wider downturn in ticket sales for monster movies as a genre, and Toho put the production of monster movies on hold. However, Toho had no intention of permanently ending the Godzilla series, and intended for the pause to only be a temporary hiatus. Throughout the remainder of the 1970s, several treatments for new Godzilla films were proposed by various writers and producers. None of these films, however, were ultimately made. It was not until 1984 and Godzilla's 30th anniversary that Toho would start production on a new Godzilla movie.

=== Home media ===
The film has been released several times on DVD in the United States. The first release, by Simitar Entertainment, was on May 6, 1998, in a fullscreen version under the title The Terror of Godzilla. The second release, by First Classic Media and distributed by Sony Music Entertainment, was on September 17, 2002. It was released both individually and as part of the Ultimate Godzilla DVD Collection box set, the latter being released on the same day.

It was then re-released by Second Classic Media, this time distributed by Genius Entertainment, on November 20, 2007, both individually and as part of the Godzilla Collection box set on April 29, 2008.

In 2019, both the Japanese version and the export English version were included in a Blu-ray box set released by the Criterion Collection, which included all 15 films from the franchise's Shōwa era.

== Bibliography ==
- Berra, John (2010). The Directory of World Films: Japan. Intellect Books. ISBN 9781841503356.
- Kalat, David (1997). A Critical History and Filmography of Toho's Godzilla Series. McFarland & Company. ISBN 0786403004.
- Ryfle, Steve (1998). Japan's Favorite Mon-Star: The Unauthorized Biography of the Big G. ECW Press. ISBN 1550223488.
- Ryfle, Steve; Godziszewski, Ed (2017). Ishiro Honda: A Life in Film, from Godzilla to Kurosawa. Wesleyan University Press. ISBN 9780819570871.
- Tucker, Guy (1976). Age of the Gods – A History of the Japanese Fantasy Film. Daikaiju Publishing.
