= Fire monster =

Fire monster may refer to:

- Fire Monsters Against the Son of Hercules
- Gigantis, the Fire Monster

== See also ==
- Smoke monster
