= Tatsumi Nikamoto =

Japanese actor

Tatsumi Nikamoto (二家本辰巳, Nikamoto Tatsumi) (born 1953) is a Japanese actor, sometimes credited as Tatsumi Fuyamoto.

== Partial filmography ==
- Zone Fighter as Garoga-Barans
- Ultraman Leo as Ultraman Leo, Ultra Seven
- Dinosaur War Izenborg as Aizenbo
- Terror of Mechagodzilla as Titanosaurus
- The Last Dinosaur as Triceratops
