= Ironfinger =

- Theatrical release poster

Japanese name
- Kanji: 100発100中
Transcriptions
- Revised Hepburn: Hyappatsu Hyakuchu
- Directed by: Jun Fukuda
- Written by: Michio Tsuzuki; Kihachi Okamoto
- Produced by: Tomoyuki Tanaka; Kenichiro Tsunoda
- Starring: Akira Takarada; Mie Hama; Ichirō Arishima
- Cinematography: Shinsaku Uno
- Edited by: Ryohei Fujii
- Music by: Masaru Sato
- Production company: Toho
- Distributed by: Toho
- Release dates: December 5, 1965 (Japan); November 9, 1966 (France)
- Running time: 93 minutes
- Country: Japan
- Language: Japanese

Ironfinger (100発100中, Hyappatsu Hyakuchu; lit. '100 Shot, 100 Killed') is a 1965 Japanese action comedy film directed by Jun Fukuda. A parody of James Bond-style spy movies, the film stars Akira Takarada, Mie Hama, and Ichirō Arishima.

== Plot ==
In the film, an ordinary vacationer is assigned to a dead Interpol agent's mission and caught between rival gangs that are squabbling over a shipment of arms.

== Cast ==
- Akira Takarada as Andrew Hoshino
- Mie Hama as Yumi Sawada
- Ichirō Arishima as Detective Tezuka
- Akihiko Hirata as Komori
- Sachio Sakai as Akatsuki Yuzurukai
- Mike Daneen as Hubert Lebois
- Jun Tatara as Kishōrei
- Toru Ibuki as Matsuki
- Chôtarô Tôgin as Ken
- Naoya Kusakawa as Takeshi Aonuma
- Andrew Hughes as Boss Stonferer
- Haruo Nakajima as Detective (uncredited)
- Masaaki Tachibana as Detective (uncredited)
- Susumu Kurobe as Man in sunglasses

== Release ==
Ironfinger was released in Japan by Toho on December 5, 1965 on a double feature with A Smell of Money (馬鹿と鋏, Baka to hasami). It was released in France on November 9, 1966 under the title Chasseur d'espions.
