= Richard Kay (producer) =

American film producer

Richard Kay was an American film producer who also did some acting and is credited with directing one film.

He produced The Golden Mistress, Godzilla, King of the Monsters!, Untamed Women and Wild Weed. He was production supervisor on Angel Baby in 1961.

== Credits ==
=== As an actor ===
- Three Sisters, 1970.
- Wuthering Heights, 1978.
- Deja Vu, 1985.

=== As a director and a producer ===
- International Burlesque, 1950.

=== As a producer ===
- She Shoulda Said No!, 1949.
- Riders of the Pony Express, 1949.
- Wild Weed, 1949.
- Untamed Women, 1952.
- The Golden Mistress, 1954.
- Curucu, Beast of the Amazon, 1956.
- Godzilla, King of the Monsters!, 1956.
- Girls on the Loose, 1958.
- Live Fast, Die Young, 1958.

=== As a production manager ===
- Riders of the Pony Express, 1949.
- Angel Baby, 1961.
