= Gigantis, the Fire Monster =

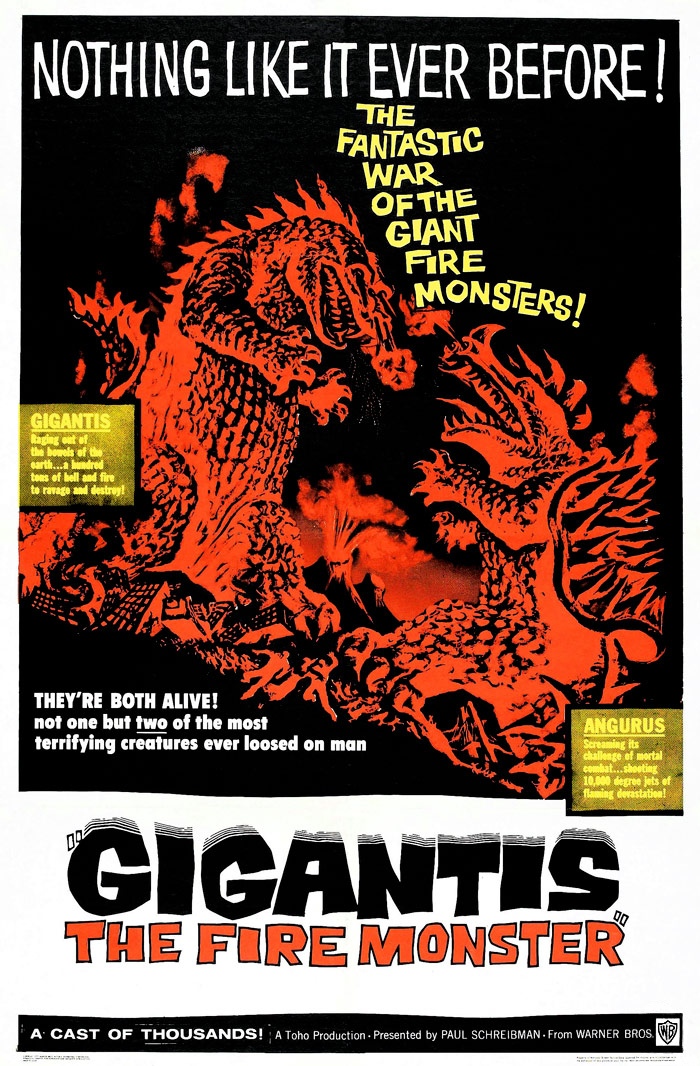
- Theatrical release poster
- Directed by: Motoyoshi Oda; Hugo Grimaldi
- Written by: Shigeaki Hidaka; Takeo Murata
- Story by: Shigeru Kayama
- Produced by: Tomoyuki Tanaka; Paul Schreibman; Edmund Goldman; Harry B. Swerdlon
- Starring: Hiroshi Koizumi; Setsuko Wakayama; Minoru Chiaki; Takashi Shimura
- Edited by: Hugo Grimaldi
- Production company: Toho Co., Ltd.
- Distributed by: Warner Bros. Pictures
- Release date: May 21, 1959 (United States)
- Running time: 78 minutes
- Countries: Japan; United States
- Language: English

Gigantis, the Fire Monster is a 1959 kaiju film directed by Motoyoshi Oda and Hugo Grimaldi, with special effects by Eiji Tsuburaya. It is an American re-edited English dubbed version of Toho Co., Ltd.'s 1955 Japanese film Godzilla Raids Again, the second entry in the Godzilla franchise. In the film, two prehistoric "fire monsters" called Gigantis and Anguirus emerge from their slumber to resume an ancient rivalry that culminates in a decisive battle in Japan.

After acquiring the North American rights, the American producers planned to produce a new film titled The Volcano Monsters that would be centered around the Japanese monster footage. Despite a completed script and cooperation from Toho (who shipped the monster suits for additional filming), the project was cancelled after funding fell through with AB-PT Pictures. Instead, the Japanese film was dubbed to English. Grimaldi served as director and editor for the dubbed version.

The film was released in the United States on May 21, 1959, 4 years after Godzilla Raids Again was released in Japan by Toho.

== Plot ==
Tsukioka and Kobayashi fly scouting planes for a small fishing fleet, based in Osaka, but a mechanical problem forces Kobayashi to set his plane down on remote Iwato island, and as he and Tsukioka are setting up camp, they are startled by a horrendous howl and discover two enormous reptilian creatures battling each other amid the rocky terrain of the island.

After successfully taking off, they report their findings to the government in Osaka. Paleontologists Dr. Tadokoro and Dr. Yamane determine that one of the prehistoric monsters is called "Gigantis", and the other is named "Anguirus". Dr. Yamane identifies both to be just as dangerous and impervious to conventional arms as another related "fire monster", which had previously destroyed Tokyo. The battles and chases between the two monsters carry them across the ocean to Osaka, where they destroy the city in the course of their combat.

Anguirus is killed and incinerated by Gigantis, who escapes out to the sea. Tsukioka and Kobayashi are later flying a patrol north of Hokkaido, when they spot Gigantis approaching a frozen island. In attempting to corral Gigantis on the island, Kobayashi's plane is hit by the monster's incendiary breath and he is killed, and as his plane crashes, a small avalanche rains down on the creature.

Tsukioka gets an idea from his friend's death and directs the military aircraft to fire their missiles, which were proven to be ineffective when used directly against Gigantis, at the icy slopes. Gigantis is soon overwhelmed and buried by the ever-rising cascade. The creature is frozen solid and left immobile in the center of the glacier-sized sheet of ice, as Tsukioka mourns Kobayashi's sacrifice.

== Cast ==
- Hiroshi Koizumi as Shoichi Tsukioka
- Setsuko Wakayama as Hidemi Yamaji
- Minoru Chiaki (Note: Credited as "Mindru Chiaki" in the American version of the film.) as Koji Kobayashi
- Takashi Shimura as Dr. Kyohei Yamane
- Masao Shimizu as Zoologist Dr. Tadokoro
- Seijirō Onda (Note: Credited as "Serjiro Onda" in the American version of the film.) as Captain Terasawa, JASDF
- Sōnosuke Sawamura as Hokkaido Branch Manager Shingo Shibeki
- Yoshio Tsuchiya as Tajima, JASDF
- Mayuri Mokushō as Radio Operator Yasuko Inouye
- Minosuke Yamada as Chief of Civil Defense
- Yukio Kasama (Note: Credited as "Yokio Kasama" in the American version of the film.) as Kohei Yamaji, President of the Fishery
- Senkichi Ōmura as Escaped Convict
- Ren Yamamoto as Commander of Landing Craft
- Shin Ōtomo as Convict Leader
- Haruo Nakajima as Gigantis/Godzilla
- Katsumi Tezuka as Anguirus

For the English dub, Keye Luke, Paul Frees, and George Takei provide the English voices for various characters.

Cast taken from Japan's Favorite Mon-star.

== Production ==
=== Crew ===
- Hugo Grimaldi – director and film editor
- Paul Schreibman – producer
- Harry B. Swerdlon — producer
- Edmund Goldman – assistant producer
- Rex Lipton – music editor
- Al Sarno — sound effects editor

Personnel taken from Japan's Favorite Mon-Star, except where cited otherwise.

=== Development ===
==== The Volcano Monsters ====
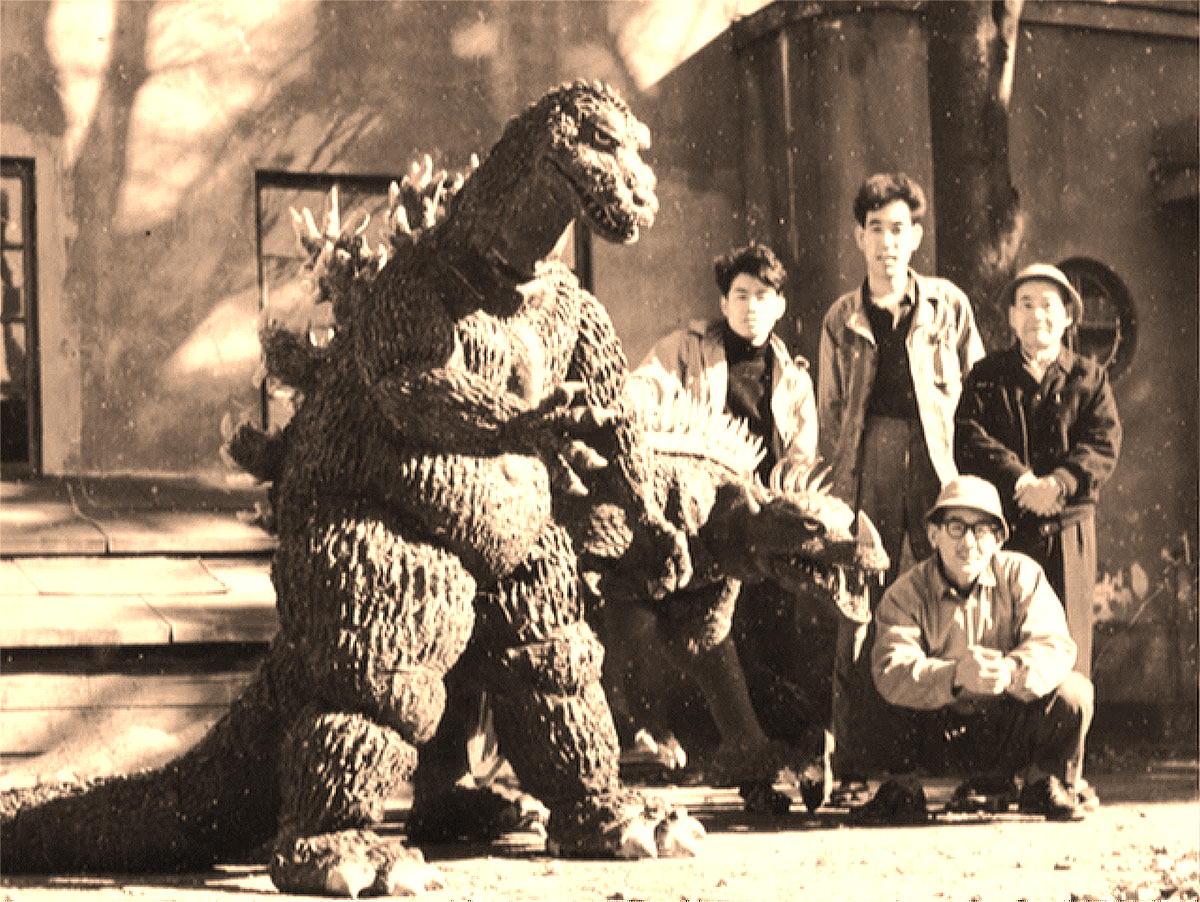
Suit makers Teizo Toshimitsu (kneeling), Kanju Yagi (left), Eizo Kaimai (middle), and Yoshio Suzuki (right) posing with new suits produced for The Volcano Monsters, prior to being shipped to Los Angeles for additional photography. However, the suits disappeared after the film was cancelled.

The North American rights to Toho Co., Ltd.'s 1955 Japanese film Godzilla Raids Again were purchased by Harry Rybnick, Richard Kay, Edward Barison, Paul Schreibman, and Edmund Goldman, the same producers who acquired the rights to the 1954 film Godzilla and localized it as Godzilla, King of the Monsters! for the U.S. in 1956. Instead of dubbing the film, the producers first planned to produce a new film titled The Volcano Monsters, while utilizing the effects footage from the original Japanese film. The producers announced in Variety that filming was expected to commence on June 17, 1957. Rybnick hired Ib Melchior and Edwin Watson to write the screenplay.

Melchior and Watson spent hours watching the Japanese version on a Moviola to build an American story around the footage and to note down footage of the monsters, military mobilization, crowds fleeing, and jets flying and attacking. The duo completed a 129 paged script, dated May 7, 1957, with instructions for the editor of where the Japanese footage was to be used. In their script, Godzilla and Anguirus were changed to dinosaurs, with Godzilla identified as a female Tyrannosaurus. All shots of Godzilla using his atomic breath were to be eliminated, and replaced with new footage of Godzilla swiping his claws at jets. Panic, disaster, and military mobilization scenes from news reels were to be included between the Japanese monster footage. The blackout was re-written to signify that the monsters destroyed a power plant.

==== Planned filming ====
Toho approved of the new film employing the Japanese effects footage and in early 1957, shipped new monster suits produced specifically for the film to Los Angeles for additional photography. The new suits were fabricated with lighter materials and the height of the Godzilla suit measured 8 inches (20 cm) taller to fit the American suit-performer. The new effects footage was to be shot at Howard A. Anderson Jr.'s special effects studio.

While filming Invasion of the Saucer Men, Bob Burns III and Paul Blaisdell recalled stumbling upon two crates holding the Godzilla and Anguirus suits. Burns recalls that the suits were made out of rubber over canvas and had already been used due to significant burns and damages. Anderson Jr. told Burns that they recently received them at the time and were intended for "shooting some inserts."

Rybnick and Barison initially struck a deal with AB-PT Pictures Corp. to co-finance the film but the company folded in 1957. The new monster suits vanished shortly after the film was abandoned and had never appeared in any official media. However, a few toys and figures based on the 1957 Godzilla suit were produced by Gow Row (as "Gigantis") and Super7 (as "Godzilla '57"); the Gow Row figure was sculpted by Yukimune Tsuji.

=== Dubbed version ===
After production on The Volcano Monsters came to a halt, Schreibman, Goldman, and then-new financier Newton P. Jacobs decided to dub the film instead. Hugo Grimaldi was hired to oversee the dubbing and editing of the film. However, credit for the English dialogue script had not been revealed since the release of the film. Dubbing for Godzilla Raids Again began at Ryder Sound Services in Los Angeles and featured the voice talents of Keye Luke, Paul Frees, and George Takei.

According to Takei, the word "banana oil" was created by the dub's director due to having difficulty finding a word to match the lip movement of the original Japanese word "bakayaro". Takei stated that people laughed during the recording due to the word being an outdated expression.

The English dialogue was based on a loose interpretation, rather than an accurate translation, of the original Japanese dialogue. This version had the working title of Godzilla Raids Again, but was changed to Gigantis, the Fire Monster upon its release. Schreibman took full credit for changing Godzilla's name to Gigantis, which was an attempt to convince audiences that "Gigantis" was a brand new monster, stating, "We called it 'Gigantis' because we did not want it to be confused with 'Godzilla' [who had clearly been killed irreparably by the oxygenator]." At one point, Schreibman inaccurately told reporters that the original Japanese film was called Angirus.

Gigantis, the Fire Monster borrows stock footage from various films, such as Unknown Island, One Million B.C., unused animation from Lost Continent, and the previous Godzilla film, as well as news reels, military footage, the space program, and educational films. Masaru Sato's original music was replaced (except for a couple of tracks) with stock music from various libraries, including the MUTEL library, as well as music from films such as Kronos (1957), Project Moonbase (1958) and The Deerslayer (1957). Gigantis/Godzilla's roar was largely replaced with Anguirus' roar.

== Release ==
Original U.S. title card (left) and U.S. DVD title card (right). For the film's U.S. DVD release, Toho requested that Classic Media change the original "Gigantis" title card to reflect Toho's international English title.

Gigantis, the Fire Monster was released theatrically in the United States by Warner Bros. Pictures on May 21, 1959, where it played as a double feature with Teenagers from Outer Space. Some drive-ins paired the film with Toho's Rodan.

Prior to the film's release, Schreibman approached Bill Foreman (then-President of Pacific Theaters) and convinced him to purchase the theatrical and television rights to both Gigantis, the Fire Monster and Teenagers from Outer Space, and helped Foreman sell the theatrical rights to Warner Bros. According to the deal, Foreman agreed to show both films in all of his theaters while Warner Bros. would distribute the films to other theaters and were given the American and Latin American theatrical rights to both films for four years.

After the film reverted to Foreman and his attorney Harry B. Swerdlow (who became designated owner of both films because Foreman did not want his name to appear on the copyright notices), they did not pursue any interest in continuing to sell the television rights, which resulted in Gigantis, the Fire Monster disappearing from American theaters and television for two decades until the rights reverted to Toho in the mid-1980s.

=== Home media ===
In 1989, Video Treasures released the American version on EP and LP VHS in the United States and Canada.

In 2007, Classic Media and Sony BMG Home Entertainment released both the Japanese and American versions on DVD in the United States and Canada. The special features include an audio commentary by Steve Ryfle, a featurette titled The Art of Suit Acting by Ed Godziszewski and Bill Gudmundson, and a slideshow of the film's theatrical posters. Per Toho's request, the original title card for Gigantis, the Fire Monster was replaced with a new title card sporting the film's official English title.

== Reception ==
On the review aggregator website Rotten Tomatoes, one review is shown for the film.

A frequently hilarious hodgepodge of reworked dialogue and unnecessary, often absurd changes.

— Rob Humanick, Rotten Tomatoes.

== Bibliography ==
- Burns, Kevin (2005). Animal Icons: It Came from Japan (TV Special). Animal Planet.
- Galbraith IV, Stuart (2008). The Toho Studios Story: A History and Complete Filmography. Scarecrow Press. ISBN 9781461673743.
- Hood, Robert; Penn, Robin (2006-09-01). Daikaiju! Giant Monster Tales. Wildside Press LLC. ISBN 9780809557585.
- Kalat, David (2010). A Critical History and Filmography of Toho's Godzilla Series (2nd ed.). McFarland. ISBN 9780786447497.
- Ryfle, Steve (1998). Japan's Favorite Mon-Star: The Unauthorized Biography of the Big G. ECW Press. ISBN 1550223488.
- Ryfle, Steve (2007). Godzilla Raids Again Audio Commentary (DVD). Classic Media.
- Ryfle, Steve; Godziszewski, Ed (2025). Godzilla: The First 70 Years - The Official Illustrated History of the Japanese Productions. Abrams Books. ISBN 978-1419762116.
