= Toru Kawai =

Japanese stunt man and actor

Toru Kawai (河合 徹, Kawai Tōru) (died 1996) was a Japanese stunt man and actor best known for playing Godzilla in Terror of Mechagodzilla and in episodes of Zone Fighter, a tokusatsu show. He is the only known actor to have played both Godzilla and Gamera.

== Partial filmography ==
- Ultraman Ace
- Zone Fighter as Godzilla
- Ultraman Taro
- Ultraman Leo
- Terror of Mechagodzilla as Godzilla
- The Last Dinosaur as Tyrannosaurus
- Gamera: Super Monster as Gamera
