= Bibari Maeda =

Japanese actress (born 1948)

- 前田 美波里
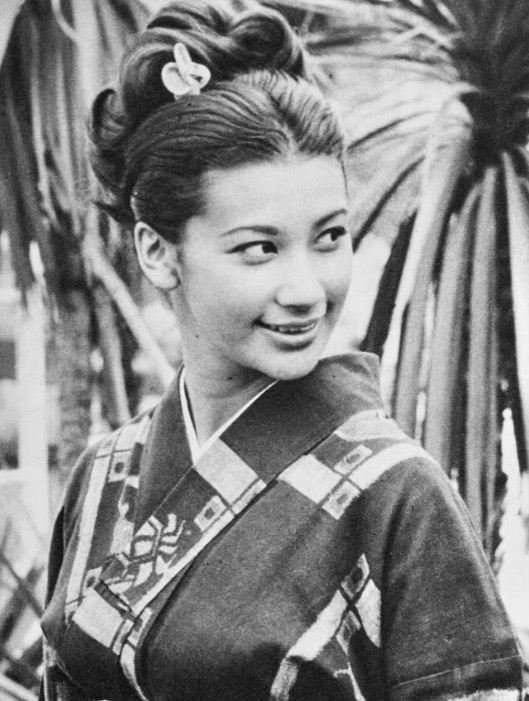
- Born: August 8, 1948 (age 78); Kamakura, Kanagawa, Japan
- Occupation: Actress
- Years active: 1966-present
- Height: 1.69 m (5 ft 7 in)
- Children: Claude Maki

Bibari "Beverly" Maeda (前田 美波里, Maeda Bibari; born August 8, 1948) is a Japanese (Note: Her father was American and her mother is half Japanese.) actress. She is known for her starring role as Saeko Matsumiya in Son of Godzilla.

== Biography ==
Maeda was born in Kamakura, Kanagawa Prefecture, to an American father and a Japanese mother. She married fellow performer Mike Maki in 1968, and their son, surfer and hip-hop artist Claude Maki, was born in 1972. Maeda has appeared in Japanese films and television programs from the 1960s into the 2020s. She modeled in a fashion show for Hanae Mori in Tokyo in 1976.

== Selected filmography ==
=== Film ===
- The Face of Another (1966) as Singer in Bar
- Let's Go, Young Guy! (1967) as Etsuko
- Judo Champion (1967) as Minako Arita
- Son of Godzilla (1967) as Saeko Matsumiya
- Hyappatsu hyakuchû: Ôgon no me (1968)
- Kigeki ekimae kazan (1968)
- Vampire Hunter D: Bloodlust (2001) as Carmilla (voice)
- McDull's Kung Fu Yochien (2012) as Mrs. McDull
- Endless Shock (2021) as Owner role
- Arrogance and Virtue (2024) as Onozato

=== TV ===
- Serial TV novel Beppin-san (November 28, 2016-, NHK)-When child role
- Aino Mating Agency (July–September 2017, TV Asahi)-Ikue Toshino
- Sunday Prime " Funny Detective 20" (June 16, 2019, TV Asahi)-As Mutsumi Kawasumi

== Awards ==
- February 2009 - Jeans Fifty Grand Prize: Special Award
- March 2009 - The 30th Matsuo Performing Arts Awards: Excellence Award
