= Ebirah, Horror of the Deep =

1966 film by Jun Fukuda

- Theatrical release poster

Japanese name
- Kanji: ゴジラ・エビラ・モスラ 南海の大決闘
Transcriptions
- Revised Hepburn: Gojira Ebira Mosura Nankai no Dai-kettō
- Directed by: Jun Fukuda
- Special effects by: Sadamasa Arikawa
- Screenplay by: Shinichi Sekizawa
- Produced by: Tomoyuki Tanaka
- Starring: Akira Takarada; Kumi Mizuno; Chotaro Togin; Hideo Sunazuka
- Cinematography: Kazuo Yamada
- Edited by: Ryohei Fujii
- Music by: Masaru Sato
- Production company: Toho Co., Ltd
- Distributed by: Toho
- Release date: December 17, 1966 (Japan)
- Running time: 87 minutes
- Country: Japan
- Language: Japanese
- Budget: ¥120 million ($1.2 million)
- Box office: ¥330 million (Japan rentals)

Ebirah, Horror of the Deep (Japanese: ゴジラ・エビラ・モスラ 南海の大決闘, Hepburn: Gojira Ebira Mosura Nankai no Dai-kettō; lit. Godzilla, Ebirah, Mothra: Big Duel in the South Seas) is a 1966 Japanese kaiju film directed by Jun Fukuda and produced and distributed by Toho Co., Ltd. The film stars Akira Takarada, Kumi Mizuno, Akihiko Hirata and Eisei Amamoto, and features the fictional monster characters Godzilla, Mothra, and Ebirah. It is the seventh film in the Godzilla franchise, and features special effects by Sadamasa Arikawa, under the supervision of Eiji Tsuburaya. In the film, Godzilla and Ebirah are portrayed by Haruo Nakajima and Hiroshi Sekita, respectively.

During its development, Ebirah, Horror of the Deep was intended to feature King Kong, but the character was replaced by Godzilla. The film was released to theaters in Japan on December 17, 1966, and was released directly to television in the United States under the title Godzilla vs. the Sea Monster in 1968 by Continental Distributing.

The film was followed by Son of Godzilla, released on December 16, 1967.

== Plot ==
After a man named Yata is lost at sea, his brother Ryota steals a yacht with his two friends and a bank robber. However, the crew runs afoul of Ebirah, a giant lobster-like creature, and washes ashore on Letchi Island. There, the Red Bamboo, a terrorist organization, manufactures heavy water for selling weapons of mass destruction and a yellow liquid that keeps Ebirah at bay, presumably controlling him. The Red Bamboo has enslaved natives from nearby Infant Island to create the yellow liquid, while the natives hope that Mothra will awaken in her winged, adult form and rescue them.

In their efforts to avoid capture, Ryota and his friends, aided by Daiyo, a native girl, come across Godzilla, who previously fought King Ghidorah and is now sleeping within a cliffside cavern. The group devises a plan to defeat the Red Bamboo and escape the island. In the process, they awaken Godzilla using a makeshift lightning rod. Godzilla fights Ebirah, but the huge crustacean escapes. Godzilla is then attacked by a giant condor named Ookondoru and a squadron of Red Bamboo fighter jets. Using its atomic breath, Godzilla destroys the jets and kills the giant bird.

Ryota and his friends retrieve the missing Yata and free the enslaved natives as Godzilla begins to destroy the Red Bamboo's base of operations, smashing a tower that causes a countdown that will destroy the island in a nuclear explosion. Godzilla fights Ebirah once more and defeats it, ripping its claws off, and forcing it to retreat into the sea. The natives await for Mothra to carry them off in a large net. However, when she gets to the island, Mothra is challenged by Godzilla due to a previous confrontation. Mothra manages to repel Godzilla and save her people and the human heroes. Godzilla also escapes just before the bomb detonates and destroys the island.

== Cast ==
- Akira Takarada as Yoshimura
- Toru Watanabe as Ryota Kane
- Toru Ibuki as Yata Kane
- Chotaro Togin as Ichino
- Hideo Sunazuka as Nita
- Kumi Mizuno as Daiyo
- Pair Bambi as the Shobijin, Mothra's tiny twin priestesses
- Jun Tazaki as Red Bamboo Commander
- Akihiko Hirata as Red Bamboo Captain Ryuui
- Hideyo Amamoto as Red Bamboo Captain Naval Officer
- Yutaka Sada as Farmer
- Hisaya Ito as Red Bamboo scientist
- Tadashi Okabe as Red Bamboo scientist
- Chieko Nakakita as Mrs. Kane
- Ikio Sawamura as an elderly slave
- Shoichi Hirose as an escaped slave
- Kazuo Suzuki as an escaped slave
- Haruo Nakajima as Godzilla
- Hiroshi Sekita as Ebirah

== Production ==
=== Writing ===
By 1966, Toho had their sights set on bringing back King Kong back to the silver screen. Their deal with RKO allowed them the use of King Kong for five years, an agreement that would be over in 1967. Why Toho waited so long to produce another Kong film is unknown. The planned movie, Operation Robinson Crusoe: King Kong vs. Ebirah (ロビンソン·クルーソー作戦 キングコング対エビラ Robinson Kurūsō Sakusen: Kingu Kongu tai Ebira), was to be a co-production with Rankin/Bass, who was about to debut their animated program, The King Kong Show, in September of that same year. According to Toho Special Effects Movies Complete Works, Jun Fukuda was approached about an untitled US–Japanese King Kong co-production on April 21, 1966. Even before that, in February 1966, Toho's senior staff member Makoto Fujimoto met with a movie theater owner in Kansai and revealed that the New Year's season would see the release of a new King Kong movie.

The concept was first pitched by Shinichi Sekizawa on July 13, 1966. However, Rankin-Bass was displeased that Toho was dead-set on Jun Fukuda directing the live-action and Eiji Tsuburaya's protege, Sadamasa Arikawa, directing special effects. Rankin-Bass was equally dead set on the creative team being Ishiro Honda and Eiji Tsuburaya. When Toho refused to budge and was unable to compromise, Rankin-Bass dropped out of the project. Toho liked the script so much that they decided to simply substitute Godzilla in place of Kong and release it as Godzilla, Ebirah, Mothra: Big Duel in the South Seas for their New Year's blockbuster. Rankin-Bass and Toho would settle their differences the next year and would begin work on King Kong Escapes (1967), which was based on the recent King Kong cartoon and would feature Honda at the director's helm.

Even with the loss of one of the title characters, though, Toho continued with production on Sekizawa's screenplay. Little was done to tweak the script and Godzilla displays a Kong-inspired interest in Daiyo. It's even possible the electric shock to revive Kong was a nod to the ape's love of electricity in King Kong vs. Godzilla.

According to Teruyoshi Nakano, Godzilla was supposed to fight a giant octopus in this film. However, Nakano likely confused this film with an early version of All Monsters Attack (1969). Both Nakano and Fukuda acted as though they were unaware the film ever started out starring King Kong. Fukuda said, "Godzilla was in the first draft of the script that I saw. I don't know what the earlier drafts were like." Fukuda further elaborated that making the film "was like pouring two cups of water into one. I had to cut one sequence after another." What these cut scenes contained are unknown, but Godzilla's infamous helicopter spin of Ebirah, which exists only in publicity photos, was apparently planned for the film, as storyboards exist of the scene.

=== Filming ===
This is the first of two Godzilla films in which a Pacific island is the primary setting, rather than a location inside Japan. The second and final one is Son of Godzilla (1967).

Director Jun Fukuda notes that producer Tomoyuki Tanaka was not particularly active on this production, with the exception of being involved with the budget. The producer would, however, visit the set "often" to watch progress.

Daiyo was originally to be played by Noriko Takahashi, from Frankenstein vs. Baragon (1965), but fell ill with appendicitis during production was replaced with Kumi Mizuno at the last second.

Although Eiji Tsuburaya is credited as the special effects director, actual directorial duties were handed over to Teisho Arikawa, who at this stage had been promoted to Tsuburaya's first assistant director. Tsuburaya still had the final say on effects sequences but served more of a supervisor role on the production.

With a new special effects director in the seat, Toho tried to limit the effects budget. Sadamasa Arikawa lamented that Toho likely did this due to his inexperience and TV history, noting that "Toho couldn't have made too many demands about the budget if Mr. Tsuburaya had been in charge" and that he "was also doing TV work then, so they must have figured I could produce the movie cheaply." To keep the budget down, Toho instructed Arikawa to avoid expensive composite shots as much as possible. Although the movie has minimal composite shots, it is not devoid of them as scenes such as Godzilla's foot composited near actress Kumi Mizuno or a sequence of Mothra composited as her followers rush toward her are some examples of these sequences that made it into the final film.

Jun Fukuda was not fond of the film. In an interview, he was quoted saying, "Toho sent me a copy of the VHS tape edition of Godzilla vs The Sea Monsters when it was released. It was like opening up an old wound, I didn't watch the tape."

=== Music ===
Director Jun Fukuda selected Masaru Sato to score his films to give it a "different touch from Ishiro Honda's", noting Sato's music was lighter than Akira Ifukube's. Producer Tomoyuki Tanaka didn't agree with this decision but Fukuda won out in the end.

=== Special effects ===
The underwater sequences were filmed on an indoor soundstage where the Godzilla and Ebirah suits were filmed through the glass of a water-filled aquarium, with some scenes of the Godzilla suit shot separately underwater as well. Haruo Nakajima wore a wet suit under the Godzilla suit for every scene that required him to be in the water, which took a week to complete the water scenes, Nakajima stated, "I worked overtime until about eight o'clock every day. I lived in the water! Generally, in the summer, everybody wants to go in the pool and play, but, when it comes to kaiju movies, it is totally different. Most of the scenes that they shoot in the water are not in the summer, but in the winter. In the middle of winter, shooting started at nine in the morning, going until noon, and then we'd take an hour off. But we'd go from 1:00 P.M. until around 5:00 at night. I needed to stay in the water all day in the suit, and shooting took a week."

The Side Monsters that featured in this film were largely dictated by suits and props that were still available from previous films. For example, the Mothra was the same prop seen in Ghidorah, the Three-Headed Monster and the giant condor was a repurposed Rodan prop used in flying scenes. Other places where the low budget of the movie can be seen is in the island setting which was picked, as islands are much cheaper to make miniatures of compared to cities. This island trend carries on in other movies such as Son of Godzilla.

== Release ==
=== Theatrical ===
Ebirah, Horror of the Deep was released theatrically in Japan on December 17, 1966 where it was distributed by Toho.

The American version of the film was released directly to television by Continental Distributing in 1968 under the title Godzilla versus the Sea Monster. The film may have received theatrical distribution in the United States as a Walter Reade Jr. Presentation, but this has not been confirmed. It was also featured on Mystery Science Theater 3000 as the last episode for the second season.

=== Home media ===
The film was released on DVD on February 8, 2005, by Sony Pictures Home Entertainment. The film was released on Blu-ray on May 6, 2014, by Kraken Releasing. In 2019, the Japanese version was included in a Blu-ray box set released by the Criterion Collection, which included all 15 films from the franchise's Shōwa era.

There are two English versions. The first one was dubbed in the 1960s by a company called Titra and featured Hal Linden. He was the voice dub for the character, Yoshimura or "Yoshi", who was played onscreen by Akira Takarada. The first English version was featured on VHS releases. The second one was dubbed with extra scenes and dialogue for DVD and Blu-ray releases. The Titra version did not use the entire movie for dubbing.
