= Son of Godzilla =

1967 film by Jun Fukuda

- Theatrical release poster

Japanese name
- Kanji: 怪獣島の決戦 ゴジラの息子
Transcriptions
- Revised Hepburn: kaijuu shima no kessen gojira no musuko
- Directed by: Jun Fukuda
- Special effects by: Sadamasa Arikawa
- Screenplay by: Shinichi Sekizawa; Kazue Shiba
- Produced by: Tomoyuki Tanaka
- Starring: Akira Kubo; Tadao Takashima; Bibari Maeda; Akihiko Hirata
- Cinematography: Kazuo Yamada
- Edited by: Ryohei Fujii
- Music by: Masaru Sato
- Production company: Toho Co., Ltd
- Distributed by: Toho
- Release date: 16 December 1967 (Japan)
- Running time: 86 minutes
- Country: Japan
- Language: Japanese
- Budget: ¥120 million
- Box office: ¥260 million (Japan rentals)

Son of Godzilla (Japanese: 怪獣島の決戦 ゴジラの息子, Hepburn: Kaijū-tō no Kessen: Gojira no Musuko; lit. Monster Island's Decisive Battle: Godzilla's Son) is a 1967 Japanese kaiju film directed by Jun Fukuda, with special effects by Sadamasa Arikawa, under the supervision of Eiji Tsuburaya. Produced and distributed by Toho Co., Ltd, it is the eighth film in the Godzilla franchise. It stars Tadao Takashima, Akira Kubo, Akihiko Hirata, and Beverly Maeda, with Hiroshi Sekita, Seiji Onaka, and Haruo Nakajima as Godzilla, and Marchan the Dwarf as Minilla.

Son of Godzilla received a theatrical release in Japan on December 16, 1967, it received mixed reactions from critics and audience. It was released directly to television in the United States in 1969 through the Walter Reade Organization.

The film was followed by Destroy All Monsters, released on August 1, 1968.

== Plot ==
A team of scientists try to perfect a weather-controlling system, but their efforts are hampered by the arrival of a nosy reporter and the presence of giant mantises. A reporter, Maki Goro, arrives on the island to find the scientists somewhat disturbed from the events, and is allowed to stay as a maintenance worker. Whilst there, he also glimpses a mysterious woman, whom the scientists were unaware of, apparently living in the jungle. The first test of the weather control system goes awry when the remote control for a radioactive balloon is jammed by an unexplained signal coming from the center of the island. Eventually finding the woman, Saeko Matsumiya, she is revealed to be the daughter of a previous researcher on the island who warned about a gigantic species of spider. The balloon detonates prematurely, creating a radioactive storm that causes the giant mantises to grow to enormous sizes. Investigating the mantises, which are named Kamacuras, the scientists find the monstrous insects digging an egg out from under a pile of earth.

The egg hatches to reveal an infant Godzilla named Minilla, and the scientists realize that his telepathic cries for help were the cause of the interference that ruined their experiment. Shortly afterwards, Godzilla arrives on the island in response to Minilla's cries, and demolishes the scientists' base while rushing to defend him. Godzilla kills two of the Kamacuras during the battle while one manages to fly away to safety. Saeko introduces herself to and bonds with Minilla by feeding him a mango. Godzilla then returns and adopts Minilla as his son.

Minilla quickly grows to about half the size of his father, and Godzilla begins instructing him on roaring and using his atomic ray, as Maki and Saeko observe them. At first, Minilla has difficulty producing anything besides atomic smoke rings, but Godzilla realizes that stressful conditions (such as stepping on his tail) or motivation produces a true radioactive blast. Minilla comes to the aid of Saeko when she is attacked by a Kamacuras, but he inadvertently awakens Kumonga, a giant spider that was sleeping in a valley which Saeko's father witnessed roaming on the island before. Kumonga attacks Saeko's cave where the scientists are hiding and Minilla stumbles into battle.

Kumonga traps Minilla and the final Kamacuras with its webbing, but as Kumonga begins to feed on the dead Kamacuras, Godzilla arrives and saves Minilla. They both work together to defeat Kumonga by using their atomic rays to kill it. Hoping to keep the monsters from interfering in their attempt to escape the island, the scientists finally use their perfected weather altering device on the island and the once tropical island becomes buried in snow and ice. As the scientists are saved by an American submarine, Godzilla and Minilla embrace and begin to hibernate as they wait for the island to become tropical again.

== Cast ==
- Akira Kubo as Maki Goro
- Tadao Takashima as Professor Kusumi
- Bibari Maeda as Saeko Matsumiya
- Akihiko Hirata as Fujisaki
- Yoshio Tsuchiya as Furukawa
- Kenji Sahara as Morio
- Kenichiro Maruyama as Ozawa
- Seishiro Kuno as Tashiro
- Hiroshi Sekita, Seiji Onaka, and Haruo Nakajima as Godzilla
- Marchan the Dwarf as Minilla

== Production ==
=== Writing ===
For the second Godzilla film in a row, Toho produced an island themed adventure with a smaller budget than most of their monster films from this time period. While the a-list crew of talent was hired to work on that year's King Kong Escapes, (Ishirō Honda, Eiji Tsuburaya, and Akira Ifukube), the second string crew of cheaper talent was once again tapped to work on this project as they had done with Ebirah, Horror of the Deep. This included Jun Fukuda (director), Sadamasa Arikawa (special effects), and Masaru Sato (composer). This was the first film where Arikawa was officially listed as the director of Special Effects, although he did receive some supervision from Tsuburaya when he was available.

The early draft of the film, done by Kazue Shiba, titled Two Godzilla's: Japan S.O.S. (2つのゴジラ：日本S.O.S.!, Gojira: Tsu no Nihon S.O.S.!). The overall plot is the same but Kumonga and the Kamacuras are not in the story.

Sadamasa Arikawa gives instructions to Marchan the Dwarf (Minilla). "Marchan the Dwarf" was hired to play the character partially for his ability to perform athletic rolls and flips inside the thick rubber suit.

=== Filming ===
Filming took place in Guam and areas in Japan including Gotemba, Lake Yamana, the Fuji Five Lakes region, and Oshima.

Toho wanted to create a baby Godzilla to appeal to the "date crowd" (a genre of films that were very popular among young couples during this time period), with the idea that girls would like a "cute" baby monster. For the idea behind Minilla, Fukuda stated, "We wanted to take a new approach, so we gave Godzilla a child. We thought it would be a little strange if we gave Godzilla a daughter, so instead we gave him a son". Fukuda also wanted to portray the monsters almost as people in regards to the father-son relationship between Godzilla and Minilla, as Fukuda stated "We focused on the relationship between Godzilla and his son throughout the course of Son of Godzilla.

At the time, Sekizawa was already tired of writing the series and likely complained that he had run out of ideas for further monster movies, and director Jun Fukuda heartily agreed. Producer Tomoyuki Tanaka then proposed the idea of introducing a son to Godzilla.

The budget for the film was 260,000,000 yen. When Son of Godzilla was released on December 16, 1967 in Japan, it sold 2,480,000 tickets. When the film was re-issued on August 1, 1973, it received 610,000 attendees, adding up to a rough attendance total of 3,090,000.

=== Special effects ===
The Godzilla suit built for this film was the biggest in terms of size and girth. This was done in order to give Godzilla a "paternal" appearance and to give a parent-like stature in contrast next to Minilla. Because of the size of the suit, seasoned Godzilla suit actor Haruo Nakajima was only hired to play Godzilla in two scenes because the suit was much too big for him to wear. The smaller suit he had worn for the films Ebirah, Horror of the Deep and Invasion of Astro-Monster was used for these sequences. The much larger Seji Onaka instead played Godzilla in the film, although he was replaced midway through filming by Hiroshi Sekita after he broke his fingers.

Minilla was designed to incorporate features of not only a baby Godzilla but a human baby was well. Minilla's face was patterned after the character Chibita from the popular manga Osomatsu-kun published by Shogakukan in Weekly Shonen Saturday at the time. "Marchan the Dwarf" was hired to play the character due to his ability to play-act and to give the character a childlike ambiance. He was also hired because of his ability to perform athletic rolls and flips inside the thick rubber suit.

Outside of the two monster suits, various marionettes and puppets were used to portray the Island's gigantic inhabitants. The various giant preying mantises known as Kamacuras and the huge spider Kumonga. Arikawa would usually have 20 puppeteers at a time working on the various marionettes. The massive Kumonga puppet needed 2 to 3 people at a time to operate each leg.

Styrofoam and paraffin were used for the snow falling on Solgell Island.

=== Deleted scenes ===
Many scenes were shot but deleted showing Godzilla being mean or harsh to Minilla. One sequence shows Godzilla leaving Minilla behind on the freezing Sollgel Island and making it to shore before turning back was cut from the final film's ending. A portion of this sequence has been preserved in both the trailer and an outtake reel included with the Godzilla Final Box DVD collection as supplemental material. More deleted footage included Godzilla expecting the newborn Minilla to get up and walk after the Kamacuras have been defeated. Another featured Godzilla head-butting Minilla to make him stop following Saeko. One scene included Minilla being able to fire his own type of atomic breath during his fight with Kamacuras. However, in the final film, the smoke rings and his Godzilla breath were utilized instead. It is unknown who was responsible for these bits being deleted, but it was possibly Tsuburaya since he would not have allowed time and resources to be wasted shooting each such scenes if he was not okay with them in the first place.

== Release ==
=== Theatrical ===
Son of Godzilla was distributed theatrically in Japan by Toho on December 16, 1967. The film was released theatrically in the United Kingdom in August 1969, as a double feature with Ebirah, Horror of the Deep. Son of Godzilla was never released theatrically in the United States, instead being released directly to television by Walter Reade Sterling as well as American International Pictures (AIP-TV) in some markets in 1969. The American television version was cut to 84 minutes.

=== Home media ===
In 2005, the film was released on DVD by Sony Pictures in its original uncut length with the original Japanese audio and Toho's international English dub. In 2019, the Japanese version and export English version was included in a Blu-ray box set released by the Criterion Collection, which included all 15 films from the franchise's Shōwa era.

== Reception ==
In a contemporary review, the Monthly Film Bulletin declared the film to be "out of the top drawer of the Toho Company's monster file, with the special effects department achieving their best results in monster locomotion" and that the film "has the advantage of a more soundly constructed story than most of its predecessors and a delightful vein of humor that allows for a gentle parody of the genre."

According to the Polish writer Aleksandra Ziółkowska-Boehm, the film appealed to Polish journalist Melchior Wańkowicz: "On August 9, Tomuś's birthday, we all went to see Son of Godzilla. I was afraid [Melchior] would be irritated by this film's type. I was again surprised, I watched with what interest he looked at the picture. Later he said that he had never seen this genre, but he was delighted with the technique of realization."

On the review aggregator website Rotten Tomatoes, 63% of 16 critics' reviews are positive, with an average rating of 4.9/10.

== See also ==
- List of Japanese films of 1967
- List of science fiction films of the 1960s
