= Jun Fukuda =

Japanese film director

- 福田 純
- Born: February 17, 1923; Changchun, Jilin province, China
- Died: December 3, 2000 (aged 77); Setagaya, Tokyo, Japan
- Occupations: Film director, screenwriter, producer
- Years active: 1949–1993

Jun Fukuda (Japanese: 福田 純, Hepburn: Fukuda Jun; February 17, 1923 – December 3, 2000) was a Japanese film director, screenwriter, and producer. He is best known for directing five entries in the Godzilla series for Toho starting with Ebirah, Horror of the Deep (1966) as well as the spy films Ironfinger (1965) and Golden Eyes (1968) starring Akira Takarada. Son of Godzilla (1967) has received particular attention from Godzilla fans. His next features with Godzilla vs. Gigan (1972) and Godzilla vs. Megalon (1973) were constrained with the extensive use of stock footage. His last Godzilla film Godzilla vs. Mechagodzilla (1974) was the first of numerous ones to feature the character of Mechagodzilla, which he co-wrote the screenplay for. While he did not particularly enjoy the five Godzilla films he made for Toho, he understood the appreciation the films had in some circles, particularly among children.

== Selected filmography ==
| Year | Title | Director | Writer | Producer | Assist. Director | Notes |
|---|---|---|---|---|---|---|
| 1949 | Suishô-yama no shônen | | | | Yes | |
| 1952 | Minato e kita otoko | | | | Yes | |
| 1953 | Akasen kichi | | | | Yes | |
| 1953 | Hana no naka no musumetachi | | | | Yes | |
| 1954 | Samurai I: Musashi Miyamoto | | | | Yes | |
| 1955 | Samurai II: Duel at Ichijoji Temple | | | | Yes | |
| 1955 | So Young, So Bright | | | | Yes | |
| 1956 | Rodan | | | | Yes | |
| 1956 | Shujinsen | | | | Yes | |
| 1956 | Ankokugai | | | | Yes | |
| 1957 | Yagyu bugeicho | | | | Yes | |
| 1958 | Yagyu bugeicho: Ninjitsu | | | | Yes | |
| 1959 | Osorubeki hi asobi | Yes | | | | |
| 1960 | The Secret of the Telegian | Yes | | | | |
| 1961 | Ankokugai gekimetsu meirei | Yes | | | | |
| 1961 | Arigataya sandogasa | Yes | | | | |
| 1961 | Nakito gozansu | Yes | | | | |
| 1961 | Nasake muyo no wana | Yes | | | | |
| 1961 | Hoero datsugokushu | Yes | | | | |
| 1962 | Josei jishin | Yes | Yes | | | Co-wrote w/ Shirō Horie and Sampei Kashimura |
| 1962 | Ankokugai no kiba | Yes | Yes | | | Co-wrote w/ Ei Ogawa and Takashi Tsuboshima |
| 1962 | Nihon ichi no wakadaisho | Yes | | | | |
| 1963 | Norainu sakusen | Yes | | | | |
| 1963 | Hawai no wakadaishô | Yes | | | | |
| 1963 | Nippon jitsuwa jidai | Yes | | | | |
| 1964 | Chi to daiyamondo | Yes | | | | |
| 1964 | Kokusai himitsu keisatsu: Tora no kiba | Yes | | | | |
| 1965 | Ironfinger | Yes | | | | |
| 1965 | Honkon no shiroibara | Yes | | | | |
| 1965 | Ankokugai gekitotsu sakusen | Yes | Yes | | | Co-wrote w/ Ei Ogawa and Yoshihiro Ishimatsu |
| 1966 | Ebirah, Horror of the Deep | Yes | | | | |
| 1966 | Doto ichiman kairi | Yes | Yes | | | Co-wrote w/ Ei Ogawa and Shinichi Sekizawa |
| 1967 | Son of Godzilla | Yes | | | | |
| 1968 | Golden Eyes | Yes | Yes | | | Co-wrote w/ Ei Ogawa and Michio Tsuzuki |
| 1968 | Operation: Mystery | | Yes | | | Writer (2 episodes) |
| 1969 | Konto 55: The Great Outer Space Adventure | Yes | | | | |
| 1969 | Dai Nippon suri washudan | Yes | | | | |
| 1969 | Nyu jirando no wakadaisho | Yes | | | | |
| 1969 | Furesshuman wakadaisho | Yes | | | | |
| 1970 | Kigeki sore ga otoko no ikiru michi | Yes | | Yes | | |
| 1970 | Yaju toshi | Yes | | Yes | | |
| 1971 | Nishi no betenshi, higashi no sagishi | Yes | | | | |
| 1971 | 3000 kiro no wana | Yes | | | | |
| 1972 | Godzilla vs. Gigan | Yes | | | | |
| 1973 | Zone Fighter | Yes | Yes | | | Director (6 episodes); Writer (3 episodes) |
| 1973 | Godzilla vs. Megalon | Yes | Yes | | | |
| 1973 | Horror of the Wolf | | Yes | | | Co-wrote w/ Shirô Ishimori and Masashi Matsumoto |
| 1974 | Kigeki damashi no jingi | Yes | Yes | | | Co-wrote w/ Tsunesaburo Nishikawa and Yasuo Tanami |
| 1974 | Godzilla vs. Mechagodzilla | Yes | Yes | | | Co-wrote w/ Hiroyasu Yamamura |
| 1974 | ESPY | Yes | | | | |
| 1975 | Detective Hagure | Yes | | | | Director (1 episode) |
| 1977 | The War in Space | Yes | | | | |
| 1978 | Monkey | Yes | | | | Director (8 episodes) |
| 1987 | Stardust Story | Yes | | | | Co-directed w/ Daisuke Yahagi |
