= Sadamasa Arikawa =

Japanese cinematographer (1925–2005)

- 有川 貞昌
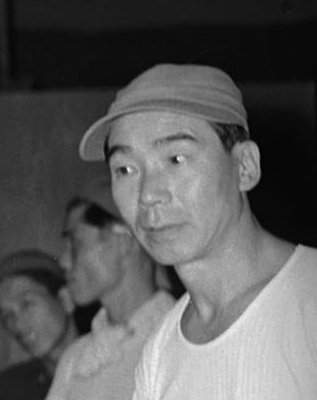
- Arikawa on set for the filming of Godzilla (1954)
- Pronunciation: pronounced [ˈsɑdə/ /əˈkiɹə/]
- Born: June 17, 1925
- Died: September 22, 2005 (aged 80); Izu, Shizuoka, Japan
- Other names: Teisho Arikama; Sam Arikawa
- Education: Nihon University
- Occupations: Film director; Cinematographer; Special effects director
- Years active: 1953–1978
- Military career
- Allegiance: Empire of Japan
- Branch: Imperial Japanese Navy

Japanese name
- Kanji: 有川 貞昌
- Kana: ありかわ さだまさ
Transcriptions
- Romanization: Arikawa Sadamasa

Sadamasa Arikawa (Japanese: 有川 貞昌, Hepburn: Arikawa Sadamasa; June 17, 1925 – September 22, 2005) was a Japanese special effects cinematographer, film director, and special effects director.

== Biography ==
Arikawa graduated from Nihon University in a degree of machinery. He went on to serve as naval aviator in the Imperial Japanese Navy during World War II, flying anti-submarine patrols over the Pacific Ocean. He left in 1945 following the Surrender of Japan.

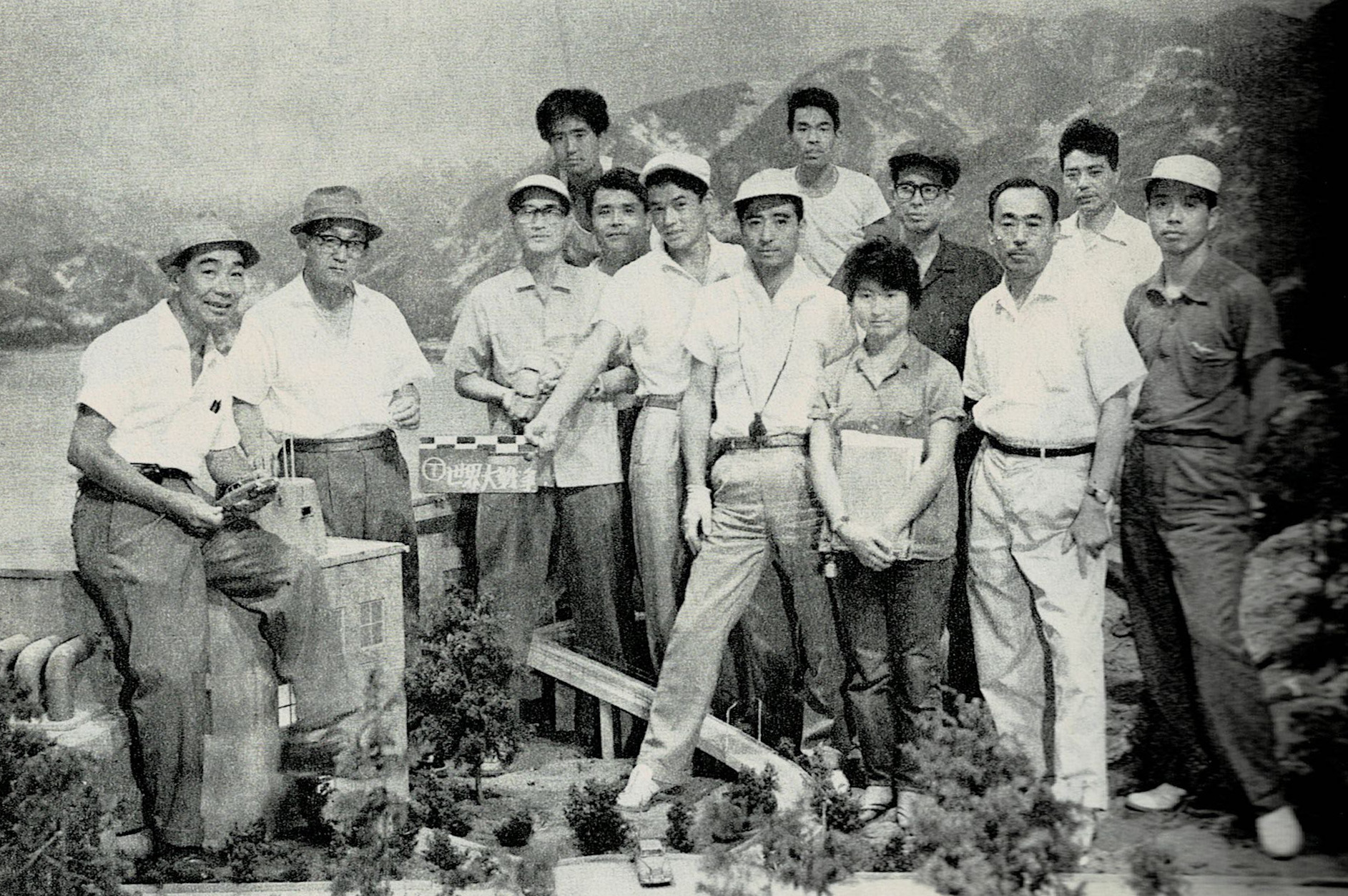
Arikawa (center) on set for The Last War (1961) with the production crew

In 1953, Arikawa began working at Toho as a cinematographer. He later met Eiji Tsuburaya. Arikawa was assigned as the special effects director for most Godzilla films, and his first film was Godzilla (1954).

In 1967, Tsuburaya was appointed "special effects supervisor", where he handed over the position for the Godzilla film series to Arikawa, starting with Son of Godzilla. Arikawa was known also as Teisho Arikama (Note: Japanese: 手匠 ありがとう. Hepburn romanization: takumi arigatō) during production of various films. In the United States, he was credited as Sam Arikawa. (Note: Japanese: サム・アリカワ. Hepburn romanization: samu ari kawa) Arikawa worked on the film Space Amoeba (1970) as his final film in Toho.

After Tsuburaya's death in January 1970, Arikawa left Toho, and worked with other companies such as the Shaw Brothers Studio.

Arikawa lived in Izu, Shizuoka. He died on September 22, 2005 in a hospital in Izu from lung cancer. He was 80.

== Bibliography ==
- Arikawa, Sadamasa (2018-08-17). Sadamasa Arikawa: Godzilla's Son and Eiji Tsuburaya (in Japanese). Yosensha. ISBN 978-4-8003-1534-2.
