= Godzilla, King of the Monsters! =

1956 monster film

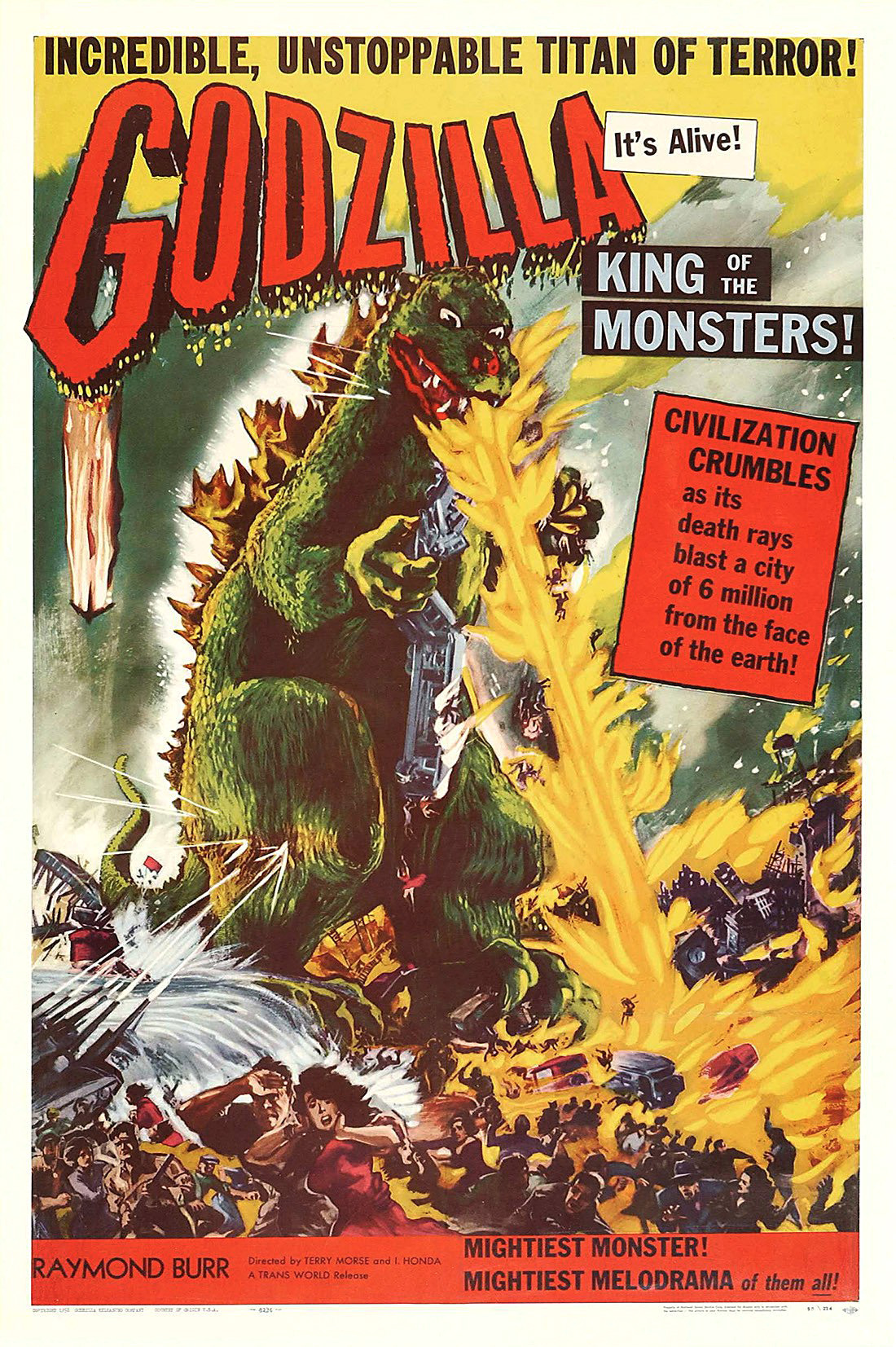
- Theatrical release poster

Japanese name
- Kanji: 怪獣王ゴジラ
Transcriptions
- Revised Hepburn: Kaijū Ō Gojira
- Directed by: Terry O. Morse; Ishirō Honda
- Special effects by: Eiji Tsuburaya
- Screenplay by: Takeo Murata; Ishirō Honda; Uncredited: Terry O. Morse
- Story by: Shigeru Kayama
- Produced by: Tomoyuki Tanaka; Uncredited: Richard Kay; Harold Ross; Edward B. Barison
- Starring: Raymond Burr
- Cinematography: Masao Tamai; Guy Roe
- Edited by: Terry Morse
- Music by: Akira Ifukube
- Production companies: Toho Co., Ltd. Jewell Enterprises, Inc.
- Distributed by: Trans World Releasing Corp. (United States); Toho (Japan)
- Release dates: April 4, 1956 (New York City); May 29, 1957 (Japan)
- Running time: 80 minutes
- Countries: Japan; United States
- Languages: English; Japanese
- Budget: $100,000
- Box office: $2 million (United States)

Godzilla, King of the Monsters! (Japanese: 怪獣王ゴジラ, Hepburn: Kaijū Ō Gojira) is a 1956 kaiju film directed by Terry O. Morse and Ishirō Honda, with special effects by Eiji Tsuburaya. It is a heavily re-edited American localization, or "Americanization", of the 1954 Japanese film Godzilla. The film was a Japanese-American co-production, with the original footage produced by Toho Co., Ltd., and the new footage produced by Jewell Enterprises. The film stars Raymond Burr, Takashi Shimura, Momoko Kōchi, Akira Takarada, and Akihiko Hirata, with Haruo Nakajima and Katsumi Tezuka as Godzilla. In the film, an American reporter covers a giant reptilian monster's attack on Japan.

In 1955, Edmund Goldman acquired the 1954 film from Toho and enlisted the aid of Paul Schreibman, Harold Ross, Richard Kay, and Joseph E. Levine to produce a revised version for American audiences. This version dubbed most of the Japanese dialogue into English, and altered and removed key plot points and themes. New footage was produced with Burr interacting with body doubles and Japanese-American actors in an attempt to make it seem like Burr was part of the original Japanese production.

Godzilla, King of the Monsters! was theatrically released in the United States in late April 1956, and was followed by an international release. In the United States, it grossed $2 million at the box office against an estimated $100,000 production budget. Initial critical reviews were mixed, but retroactive reviews were favorable. The film was responsible for introducing Godzilla to a worldwide audience, as the 1954 film remained unavailable officially outside of Japan until 2004.

== Plot ==
Injured American reporter Steve Martin is brought from the ruins of Tokyo to a hospital filled with maimed and wounded citizens. A recent acquaintance, Emiko, discovers him by chance among the victims and attempts to find a doctor for him. Martin recalls in flashback stopping over in Tokyo, where a series of inexplicable offshore ship disasters catches his attention. When a victim of those disasters washes up on Odo Island, Martin flies there for the story, along with security officer Tomo Iwanaga. There he learns of the island inhabitants' long-held belief in a sea monster known as "Godzilla", which they believe caused the ship disasters. That night, a heavy storm strikes the island, destroying houses and killing some villagers. The islanders believe that Godzilla was actually responsible for the destruction.

Martin returns to the island with Dr. Yamane, who is leading a team to investigate the damage. Huge radioactive footprints and prehistoric trilobite are discovered. An alarm rings and Martin, the villagers, and Dr. Yamane's team head up a hill for safety. Near the summit, they encounter Godzilla, and they quickly flee downhill. Upon Dr. Yamane's later return to Tokyo, he deduces that Godzilla is 400 feet (120 m) tall and was resurrected by the repeated hydrogen bomb testing in the Pacific. To Yamane's dismay, the military responds by attempting to kill the monster using depth charges. Martin contacts his old friend, Dr. Daisuke Serizawa, for dinner, but Serizawa declines due to a previous commitment with his fiancée, Emiko, Dr. Yamane's daughter.

Emiko goes to Serizawa's home to break off her arranged engagement with him because she is actually in love with Hideo Ogata, a salvage ship captain. Dr. Serizawa, however, gives her a demonstration of his secret project, which horrifies her. She is sworn to secrecy and unable to bring herself to break off the engagement. Godzilla surfaces from Tokyo Bay, unharmed by the depth charges, and attacks the city, destroying a train before returning to the bay. The next morning, the Japan Self-Defense Forces (JSDF) supercharges the tall electrical towers along Tokyo's coast to repel the monster.

Godzilla resurfaces that night and breaks through the electrical towers and JSDF defense line using his atomic heat breath. Martin documents Godzilla's rampage via tape recorder and is injured during the attack. Godzilla returns to the sea and the flashback ends. Martin wakes up in the hospital with Emiko and Ogata. Horrified by the destruction, Emiko reveals to them the existence of Dr. Serizawa's Oxygen Destroyer, which disintegrates oxygen atoms in saltwater and causes all marine organisms to die of acidic asphyxiation. Emiko and Ogata go to Dr. Serizawa to convince him to use his powerful weapon on Godzilla, but he initially refuses. After watching a television broadcast showing the nation's continuing plight, Serizawa finally gives in to their pleas, then burns his notes and papers on the formula.

A ship takes Ogata, Serizawa, Yamane, Martin, and Emiko out to the deepest part of Tokyo Bay. In hardhat diving suits, Ogata and Serizawa are lowered down by lifelines near Godzilla to plant the weapon. Ogata is pulled up, but Serizawa delays his ascent and activates the device. He radios the surface of its success and wishes Emiko and Ogata happiness together. Serizawa cuts his lifelines, taking the secret of his invention to the grave. Godzilla succumbs to the Oxygen Destroyer, which dissolves its body and bones. All aboard the ship mourn the loss of Dr. Serizawa. Martin reflects that the world can "live again" due to Serizawa's ultimate sacrifice.

== Cast ==
- Raymond Burr as Steve Martin
- Takashi Shimura as Dr. Yamane
- Momoko Kōchi as Emiko
- Akira Takarada as Ogata
- Akihiko Hirata as Dr. Serizawa
- Sachio Sakai as Hagiwara
- Fuyuki Murakami as Dr. Tabata
- Ren Yamamoto as Seiji
- Toyoaki Suzuki as Shinkichi
- Tadashi Okabe as Dr. Tabata's Assistant
- Toranosuke Ogawa as President of Company
- Frank Iwanaga as Security Officer Tomo
- Mikel Conrad as George Lawrence
- James Hong as Ogata and Dr. Serizawa (English voices)
- Sammee Tong as Dr. Yamane (English voice)
- Haruo Nakajima as Godzilla
- Katsumi Tezuka as Godzilla

Cast taken from Japan's Favorite Mon-star.

== Production ==
=== Crew ===
- Terry O. Morse – co-director, writer, supervising editor
- Joseph E. Levine – executive producer
- Terry Turner – executive producer
- Ed Barison – executive producer
- Ira Webb – assistant director
- Art Smith – sound
- George Rohrs – sets, sound effects
- Guy Roe – cameraman

Personnel taken from A Critical History and Filmography of Toho's Godzilla Series.

=== Development ===
"We weren't interested in politics, believe me. We only wanted to make a movie we could sell. At that time, the American public wouldn't have gone for a movie with an all-Japanese cast. That's why we did what we did. We didn't really change the story. We just gave it an American point of view."

— Richard Kay on the film's alterations

In 1955, Manson International co-founder Edmund Goldman approached Toho International Inc. (a Los Angeles-based subsidiary created to distribute Toho films overseas) about purchasing the rights to Godzilla. Toho had shown Goldman advertising materials, which interested him in a screening of the film. Goldman then made Toho an offer of $25,000 for the theatrical and television rights, which they accepted quickly. The contract was signed on September 27, 1955. The contract stipulated that Toho and Goldman agreed that the film would be "narrated, dubbed in English and completed by the revisions, additions, and deletions," with final approval by Toho.

Paul Schreibman assisted in the film's acquisition. Samuel Z. Arkoff of American International Pictures also made a bid for the film, negotiating with Toho for three months until he discovered the rights had already been sold to Goldman. Goldman enlisted the help of Harold Ross (sometimes credited as Henry Rybnick) and Richard Kay of Jewell Enterprises to distribute the film. According to Goldman, Ross and Kay's idea was to dub the film and hire Raymond Burr. Goldman would later sell his interest to Jewell Enterprises.

Ross and Kay turned to Joseph E. Levine to further finance the project. The duo arranged a screening of the film for Levine in Los Angeles. The film's possibilities excited Levine and paid $100,000 for half of the rights. This arrangement allowed the rights to Godzilla to be split between Jewell Enterprises and Levine's Embassy Pictures. Levine enlisted Edward Barison to create Trans World Releasing Corp., to distribute the film. Levine also enlisted producer Terry Turner to develop promotional strategies, which cost $400,000. Turner managed to get the film mentioned by Steve Allen on The Tonight Show. Levine and Turner initially considered the title Godzilla, the Sea Beast, but eventually settled on Godzilla, King of the Monsters. Ross and Kay hired Terry O. Morse to direct the film. Schreibman had arranged for Burr to participate in the film. Morse was paid $10,000 for re-writing and directing the film and Burr was paid the same amount for a single day's work.

=== Filming and dubbing ===
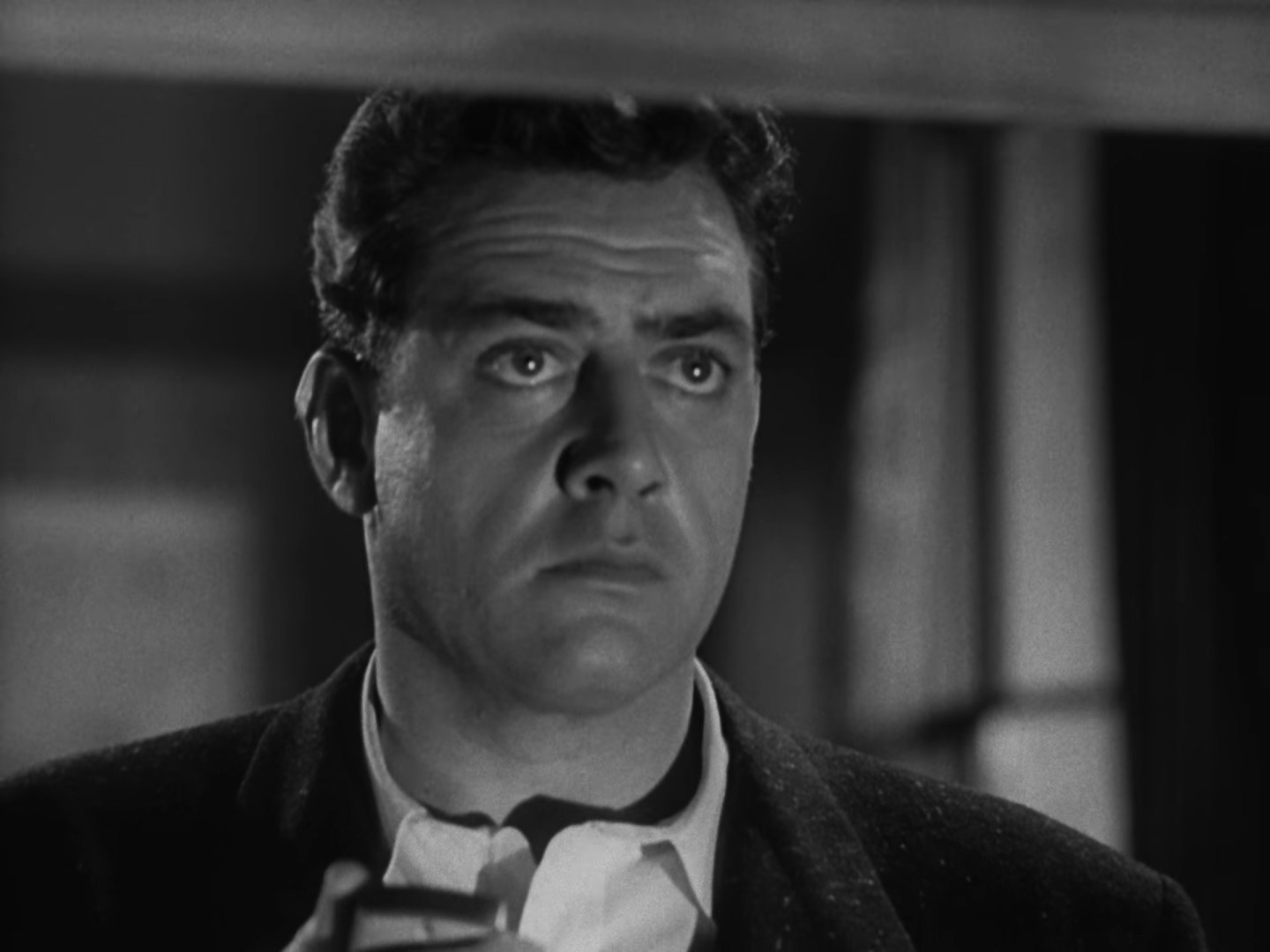
Steve Martin, as portrayed by Raymond Burr in the film. In an attempt to appeal to American audiences, the American release featured new footage with Burr mostly leading the film. Body doubles, trick photography, and careful editing were utilized to make Burr seem as if he was part of the original Japanese production.

Alterations and new footage with Burr interacting with body doubles were produced to appeal to American audiences, as foreign films held no appeal to the mainstream public at the time. Morse viewed the original Japanese cut, with an English translation of the script, to find key scenes in which Burr could be inserted. Rather than dub the entire film, Morse chose to retain most of the original Japanese dialogue and have Frank Iwanaga translate, albeit inaccurately, those scenes and alternate with Burr narrating. Burr worked with body doubles, who were filmed over their shoulder to conceal their faces. Editing techniques were also used to mask the body doubles and the original Japanese actors. Asian-American extras were hired to play minor roles. The new footage was filmed in three days on a rented soundstage at Visual Drama Inc. Burr shot his footage over six days although he later said it was one day and he worked twenty-four hours. Set decorator George Rohr provided mock-up sets that resembled the sets in the original Japanese cut. Overt references to the atom bomb and hydrogen bomb, such as the bombing of Nagasaki, the Bikini Island tests, radioactive contamination of tuna by American and Russian bomb tests, were omitted.

The dubbing for the entire film was recorded in under five hours. James Hong and his-then comedy partner Sammee Tong were cast to provide the voices. They were locked in a room with Morse and were told to read for every role. Each line was recorded at different speeds and the best one was chosen to match the footage. The voice actors never saw the film as they recorded their lines, and completed the entire film sitting at a table with a microphone before them. Hong confirmed that several Japanese actors auditioned for voice-over roles, but he and Tong were hired due to their versatility. Tong recorded voices for six older characters, while Hong recorded for seven younger characters.

== Release and reception ==
=== Theatrical and box office ===
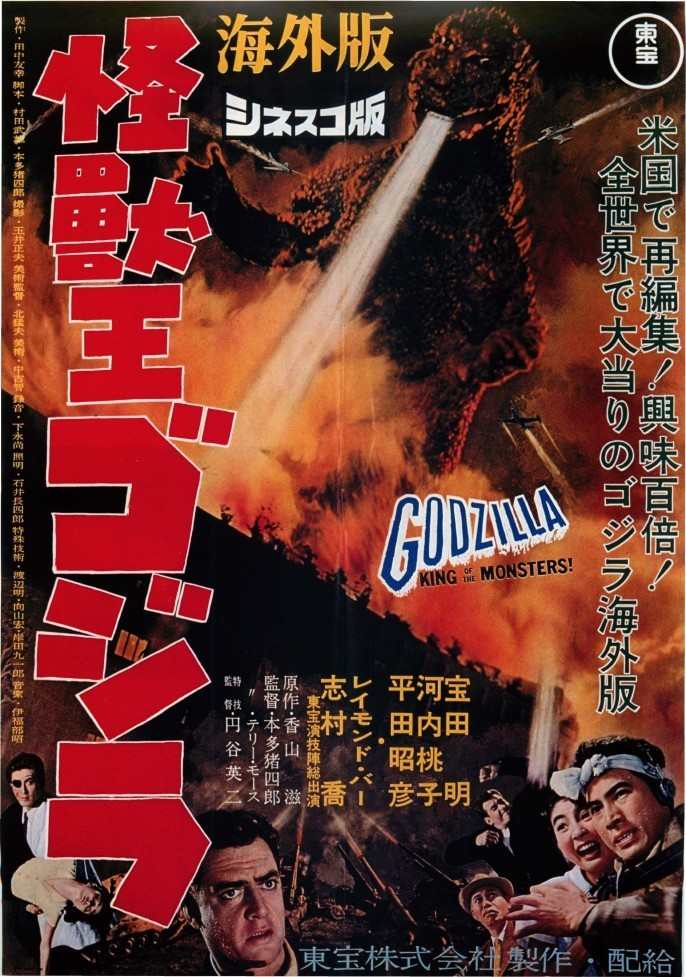
Theatrical poster for the 1957 Japanese release. Honda was unaware that the film was heavily localized in the United States until it was released in Japan.

Godzilla, King of the Monsters! opened on April 4, 1956, in Loew's State Theater in New York City. It was theatrically released in the United States in late April, 1956. The film earned more than $2 million at the box office during its initial theatrical run, nearly four times what the film netted in Japan. The film earned a $200,000 profit for its producers. The TV rights were sold to RKO, and it made its television broadcast debut in 1959 on KHJ-TV in Los Angeles. The film was theatrically released in Japan on May 29, 1957, as Kaijū Ō Gojira (Monster King Godzilla) to a positive reception from Japanese audiences, with the English dialogue subtitled in Japanese and the film cropped in Toho Pan Scope 2:1.

It was the first Japanese feature to become a commercial success in the United States and was, at the time, the fourth foreign film to have grossed more than $1 million at the American box office. Goldman originally acquired the film to distribute in the American and Canadian markets. Due to the film's commercial success, however, foreign distributors became interested in acquiring the American cut. Trans World, therefore, renegotiated with Toho to license the American version to foreign markets.

This version of the film became an international hit across the Western world. It was released in France on February 14, 1957, where it became the 79th-highest-grossing film of 1957, selling 835,511 tickets. In the United Kingdom, the film had a successful run at the London Pavilion.

=== Critical response ===
Initial reception from contemporary critics were mixed, but retroactive reviews were more favorable. On the review aggregator website Rotten Tomatoes, 85% of 26 critics' reviews are positive, with an average rating of 6.7/10. Metacritic, which uses a weighted average, assigned the film a score of 61 out of 100, based on 8 critics, indicating "generally favorable" reviews.

New York Times film critic Bosley Crowther disparaged Godzilla, King of the Monsters!, dismissing it as "an incredibly awful film". After complaining about the dubbing, the special effects ("a miniature of a dinosaur") and the similarity to King Kong, he concluded, "The whole thing is in the category of cheap cinematic horror-stuff, and it is too bad that a respectable theater has to lure children and gullible grown-ups with such fare". On the film's alterations, critic Danny Peary accused the producers of making "deletions that arouse suspicions regarding the cover-up of references to damage done by the A-bomb". Film critic Tim Lucas noted, "Much has been done to Americanize the Godzilla series over the decades, much of it inane and destructive, but the craft and cleverness that went into Godzilla, King of the Monsters! is immediately apparent". Over the years, original director Ishirō Honda was asked by film historians if the alterations made by the American version without his permission had offended him. Honda found the alterations amusing, stating that his film was "trying to imitate American monster movies".

In writing for Ritual and Event, Aaron Kerner stated, "the 1956 Godzilla, King of the Monsters transforms Gojira into a run of the mill science fiction film". William Tsutsui criticized the film for watering down the original themes, stating, "although Gojira was not exactly eviscerated in this transition, with the terrifying charm of the monster thankfully surviving the cinematic surgery, much of the emotional power, intellectual depth, social relevance, and visceral impact of Gojira was lost in its translation to US movie screens". Film historian David Kalat felt that Burr's narration during Godzilla's rampage improves upon the original scene, stating, "Burr's speeches here are chilling and memorable". Kalat further praised how the narration renders Burr's character as impotent, stating, "not even the American hero can save the day this time".

Film historian Steve Ryfle called the film's flaws "obvious" when compared with the Japanese version. However, when judged on its own merits, Ryfle commented, "the film is one of the best American atomic-monster movies of the 1950s, on par with—or even better than—the classic giant-ant thriller Them!" Ryfle added that the film's scripting, directing, and special effects were "far superior" than other American monster films of the same period.

=== Home media ===
Following the film's successful box office run, the television rights to the film were sold for $50,000 in the late 1950s.

Vestron Video released Godzilla, King of the Monsters on all available home media formats (VHS, Betamax, CED, and LaserDisc) simultaneously in mid-1983.

In 1994, footage of Toho's faux widescreen version was included in Toho Video's 40th anniversary special edition LaserDisc.

The film was released on DVD and VHS by Simitar Entertainment in 1998 and on DVD and VHS by Classic Media in 2002. In 2006, Classic Media and Sony BMG released a two-disc DVD set titled Gojira: The Original Japanese Masterpiece. This release features both the 1954 film and the 1956 American version, making the original Japanese version of the film available on DVD in North America for the first time. This release features theatrical trailers, audio commentaries by film historians Steve Ryfle and Ed Godziszewski, two 13-minute documentaries titled "Godzilla Story Development" and "Making of the Godzilla Suit", and a 12-page essay booklet by Ryfle. This release also restores the original ending credits of the American film which, until recently, were thought to have been lost.

In 2012, the Criterion Collection released a "new high-definition digital restoration" of Godzilla on Blu-ray and DVD. This release includes a remaster of the 1956 American version, Godzilla, King of the Monsters (completely uncut for the first time since its theatrical release), as well as other special features such as interviews with Akira Ikufube, Japanese film critic Tadao Sato, actor Akira Takarada, Godzilla performer Haruo Nakajima, effects technicians Yoshio Irie and Eizo Kaimai and audio commentaries on both films by David Kalat, author of A Critical History and Filmography of Toho's Godzilla Series. In 2014, Classic Media reissued Gojira and Godzilla, King of the Monsters! in a 2-disc DVD release, to commemorate the release of Legendary's Godzilla film. This release retained the same specs and features as the 2006 DVD release.

In 2017, Janus Films and the Criterion Collection acquired the film, as well as other Godzilla titles, to stream on Starz and FilmStruck. In 2019, the film was included as part of a Blu-ray box set released by the Criterion Collection (their 1000th release), which included all 15 films from the franchise's Shōwa era. In May 2020, the film became available on HBO Max upon its launch.

=== Italian re-release ===
Theatrical poster by Enzo Nistri for the 1977 Italian re-release. The poster would later be used for the first issue cover of Fangoria.

In 1977, Italian filmmaker Luigi Cozzi released to Italian theaters a further modified and colorized version of Godzilla, King of the Monsters, with a soundtrack that used a magnetic tape process similar to Sensurround. Though the Italian colorized version was released as Godzilla, it is referred to by fans, and by Cozzi himself, as Cozzilla. Cozzi coined that title as a pen name when he was writing for magazines, later adopting it as the production company name for re-releasing the film. According to Cozzi, Toho had licensed the colorized version to Turkey. Cozzi noted that his colorization was the first attempt ever done at colorizing a black-and-white feature.

Due to the success of the 1976 remake of King Kong, Cozzi attempted to cash in on the film's success by re-releasing Gorgo. Cozzi, however, was unable to acquire the film because "the King Brothers asked for too much money". Cozzi then selected Godzilla as his second option. He originally intended to acquire the original 1954 film, but Toho was only able to provide negatives for the 1956 American version. Cozzi's regional distributors refused to release it after discovering that the film was in black and white, so he chose to colorize it to secure its release. Cozzi renegotiated with Toho, gaining their approval. Included in the new deal was that Toho retained sole ownership of the colorized negative. Cozzi had final approval over the stock footage, music, and colorization. At the time, theatrical films were required to run for 90 minutes. Therefore, Cozzi was forced to add stock footage to extend the film's runtime:

"The decision to insert extra footage was because the original film was 1 hour and 20 minutes. While this was the normal length in the fifties, a film to be shown theatrically had to run 1 hour and 30 minutes in the mid-seventies. So we were forced to add material to it to reach that length. Its final length was 1 hour and 45 minutes".

The decision by Cozzi to specifically add real footage of death and destruction from war-time film reels was intentional. He wanted to give such an old feature an "up-to-date and more violent look". While editing the film, Cozzi was aware that certain stock footage did not match the Godzilla footage, but he chose to proceed anyway, feeling that the "effect would have been stronger than the defects". Additional footage was recycled from The Train and The Day the Earth Caught Fire. As tributes, Cozzi added brief clips from The Beast from 20,000 Fathoms and Godzilla Raids Again, taken from his personal 16 mm prints. He coined the term "Spectrorama 70" for advertising purposes, referring to the film's colorization and for a feeling of 70 mm. Cozzi stated that it "helped to give a 'bigger' look to my Godzilla theatrical re-release advertising materials".

For the soundtrack, Cozzi reprocessed the original 1956 soundtrack, turning it into a magnetic band eight-track stereophonic variation by adding new music and sound effects. Cozzi later added Sensurround effects and special giant loudspeakers to the theaters playing the film. Using the pseudonym "Magnetic System", Vince Tempera composed the film's additional score alongside Fabio Frizzi and Franco Bixio using his personal electric piano. Cozzi hired Tempera after he expressed interest in collaborating on a project. Tempera, a fan of Godzilla, immediately accepted. Cozzi selected synth music because he wanted the score to give his version of the film a "modern look" and have audiences see the difference between the new scenes and the originals. During the film's opening weekend, Tempera's additional score was released as a 45 rpm record (it was later released as a 33 rpm LP).

Cozzi hired Enzo Nistri to paint a new poster for Cozzi's colorized release (Nistri's poster was later used on the first issue cover of Fangoria magazine). Cozzi hired Armando Valcauda to do the colorization of the film, while Alberto Moro, Cozzi's mentor, was hired to edit the film. It was colorized frame by frame using stop motion gel photography. The process took only three months, as they were in a rush to release the film. Valcauda did all the colorization himself, while Cozzi edited the film with Moro. Cozzi noted that Yamato Video in Milan owns one new 35 mm print of the colorized version and an original colorized 35 mm film negative, acquired from Toho. Yamato planned to release the original 1954 version, the 1956 American cut, and the 1977 Italian color cut on DVD. Those plans, however, were abandoned after the DVD release of the 1954 film flopped financially.

== Legacy ==
While the 1954 film is credited for starting the franchise and establishing the template for tokusatsu filmmaking, Godzilla, King of the Monsters! was responsible for introducing international audiences to the character of Godzilla; the Japanese version remained officially unavailable overseas until 2004, but was screened at New York and Chicago film festivals in 1982 honoring Takashi Shimura's work. After the release of the 1956 American version, Toho adopted the moniker "King of the Monsters" in publicity materials. The moniker was used as the title for the 1983 unproduced American film and as the title for Legendary's Godzilla sequel. Subsequent Godzilla films featured reporters as the leads. Kalat credits Burr for this trend, stating, "these reporter heroes may owe their prominence to the legacy of Raymond Burr's Steve Martin". Similarly, journalist Jason Notte credited the film for heralding foreign films to a wider Western audience, proclaiming Godzilla, King of the Monsters! as "the most important foreign film in American history." In 2018, NECA released a repainted Godzilla figure based on the theatrical poster of Godzilla, King of the Monsters!.

Steven Spielberg has also openly credited the film for being a very prominent inspiration for his 1993 film adaptation of Jurassic Park.

=== Sequel ===
In 1985, New World Pictures released Godzilla 1985, an American localization of the 1984 Japanese film The Return of Godzilla. Like Godzilla, King of the Monsters!, new footage was filmed for the American version, scenes and themes re-edited or omitted, and the entire dialogue dubbed in English. Burr reprised his role as Steve Martin, acting as an adviser to the Pentagon, but did not interact within the Japanese characters as he had done in King of the Monsters. The Return of Godzilla was a sequel to the 1954 film, and Godzilla 1985 served as a sequel to Godzilla, King of the Monsters!.

== See also ==
- List of American films of 1956
- Godzilla (franchise)
- Godzilla (1954 film)
- Godzilla (1998 film)
- Godzilla (2014 film)
- The Return of Godzilla
- Godzilla: King of the Monsters (2019 film)
