= Zone Fighter =

- Title card
- Genre: Tokusatsu; Kaiju; Superhero; Science fiction Kyodai Hero
- Developed by: Toho
- Written by: Koji Amemiya; Jun Fukuda; Juro Shimamoto; Tomoyuki Tanaka; Susumu Takeuchi; Shozo Uehara
- Directed by: Ishirō Honda; Jun Fukuda; Kengo Furusawa; Akiyasa Kikuchi; Masao Minowa; Kohei Oguri
- Opening theme: Ryusei Ningen Zone by Masato Shimon and Children's Lake Choir
- Ending theme: Ryusei Victory by Masato Shimon
- Country of origin: Japan
- No. of episodes: 26

Production
- Executive producer: Tomoyuki Tanaka
- Running time: 22 minutes

Original release
- Network: Nippon Television
- Release: April 2 – September 24, 1973

Zone Fighter, known in Japan as Meteor Human Zone (流星人間ゾーン, Ryūsei Ningen Zōn), is a tokusatsu science fiction superhero television series. Produced by Toho Company Ltd., the show aired on Nippon Television from April 2 to September 24, 1973, with a total of 26 episodes. This was Toho's answer to not only the popular Ultra Series, but the Henshin Hero phenomenon started by shows like Kamen Rider and Android Kikaider. The previous year, Toho had just made their first successful superhero show, Rainbowman. The series was also notable for its guest appearances by Toho's own Godzilla, as well as two other Toho monsters, King Ghidorah and Gigan. Supplementary materials published by Toho have confirmed Zone Fighter to be part of the same continuity as the Showa era Godzilla series, taking place in between Godzilla vs. Megalon and Godzilla vs. Mechagodzilla.

== Characters ==
=== Sakimori/Zone family ===
The Sakimori/Zone family resembles a normal Japanese family, but they are an alien family that came to Earth after their home planet, Peaceland, was destroyed by the evil aliens called the Garogans. To stop the Garogan army's invasion on Earth, the Sakimori family's three children, Hikaru (the oldest son), Hotaru (the teenage sister) and Akira (the youngest son) transform into the superheroes Zone Fighter, Zone Angel, and Zone Junior. Their transformation code (associated with a "henshin" pose) is "Zone Fight Power".

- Hikaru Sakimori/Zone Fighter is the oldest of the siblings. He works as a test driver for cars. Upon uttering the command "Zone Double Fight," Zone Fighter can also grow to giant size (with a streamlined metallic head) to fight the Garogas' Terro-Beasts. His killing attacks are the "Meteor Missile Might", where he shoots a monster with missiles mounted on his wrists, and the "Meteor Proton Beam" fires from his head crest to destroy tougher monsters. Just like Ultraman, he can only become giant-sized for a limited time, and the meter light on his belt buckle changes from blue (normal) to yellow (caution) to red (danger). He was played by Kazuya Aoyama.
- Hotaru Sakimori/Zone Angel is the second oldest of the siblings. She attends high school. She was played by Kazumi Kitahara.
- Akira Sakimori/Zone Junior is the youngest of the siblings. He attends grade school. He was played by Kenji Sato.
- Yoichiro Sakimori is the father of the three children. He is the proprietor of the Toy Research Institute, which explains the family's penchant for toys. He invents the gadgets and vehicles used by the Zone siblings to fight the Garogan army. He was played by Shoji Nakayama.
- Tsukiko Sakimori is Yoichiro's wife and the mother of the three children. She was played by Sachiko Kozuki.
- Raita Sakimori/Zone Great is Yôichirô's father and the grandfather of the three children. When his grandchildren are in a terrible predicament, he uses the Great Raideki satellite to get them out of trouble. He was played by Shiro Amakusa.
- Godzilla, is Zone Fighter's occasional ally in fighting the Garogan Terro-Beasts, called forth by the Zone Family to assist Zone Fighter when the latter he is outmatched or injured. As the series progresses, Godzilla becomes a friend to Zone Fighter and resides in a "Godzilla Cave" made by the family, show in Episode 21. Godzilla appears in Episodes 4, 11, 15, 21, and 25 in the series. He was played by Toru Kawai and Isao Zushi. The latter would play Godzilla next in 1974's Godzilla vs. Mechagodzilla. The former would play Godzilla next in 1975's Terror of Mechagodzilla.

=== Zone arsenal ===
- Mighty Liner is Zone Fighter's car. Transforms from his racecar Skyline GT. It can also fly.
- Smokey is the mini-aircraft Zone Angel and Junior ride. So named because it resides in a cloud until called upon. Zone Angel and Junior can recharge Fighter's energy with an emergency battery that comes with the aircraft.
- Bolt Thunder/Great Raideki is the cloud-controlled by Raita Sakamori from the control panel in the family's house. Shoots destructive lightning bolts that can damage a Terro-Beast.

=== Garogan army ===
The Garogas are a race of space aliens from the planet Garoga. They have red, black, blue, and yellow bodies, along with the same colors for the eyes, faces and floppy antennae. They operate on a huge satellite in space.

- Gold Garoga - He is the leader of the Garogan army. He wears a cape to signify his authority. He is sometimes known as "Baron Garoga." He was voiced by Munemarou Kouda, who would later play Dr. Man in the 1984 sentai series Choudenshi Bioman and Gorma Emperor XV in the 1993 sentai Series Gosei Sentai Dairanger.
- Silver Garogas - They are the Garogan henchmen.
- Red Garogas - They are the Garogan generals. When there is a pack of henchmen, they act as the leaders of the packs.
- White Garogas - They are the Garogan scientists. They create the Terro-Beasts that fight Zone Fighter.
- Garogan X-Agents - They are a squadron of Garogas that were highly trained for any situation. They were the last weapons sent to kill Zone Fighter. During the series finale, they merge to create the monster Grotogauros.
- Terro-Beasts are the various giant monsters sent by the Garogan army to attack the Earth. They are sent in various ways:
  - They are launched to Earth from the Garogan satellite via a Terro-Beast missile.
  - A Garoga transforms into a Terro-Beast while spying on Earth.
  - A certain group of Garogas can merge to become Terro-Beasts in desperate times.

=== Terro-Beasts ===
- Red Spark (episode 1)
- Jikiro (episodes 1, 22, and 25)
- Destro-King (episodes 2 and 12)
- Dorola (episode 3)
- Wagilar (episode 4)
- Spyler (episodes 4 and 12)
- King Ghidorah: (episodes 5 and 6)
- Dragon King (episodes 7 and 12)
- Gilmoras (episode 7)
- Gellderah (episode 8)
- Garoga Spider (episode 9)
- Goro-Gorilla (episode 9)
- Spider Uros (episodes 9 and 25)
- Jipudoro (episode 10)
- Shadorah (episode 10)
- Gigan: (episode 11)
- Barakidon (episode 12)
- Garoborg (episodes 13 and 25)
- Dedragon (episode 14)
- Zandolla (episode 15)
- Moguranda (episodes 16 and 25)
- Barugas (episode 17)
- Gondargilas (episodes 18 and 19)
- Goramu (episode 20)
- Jellar (episode 21)
- Kastam-Jellar (episode 21)
- Bakugon (episode 23)
- Needlar (episode 24)
- Kabutoji (episode 25)
- Grotogauros (episode 26)

=== -Special appearances ===
- King Ghidorah appeared in episodes 5 and 6. In these appearances, the extraterrestrial dragon was discovered being controlled by the Garogas. He is also the only monster in the series (excluding Godzilla) that wasn’t killed. This due to not conflict with the events of Destroy All Monsters due to it taking place in the Showa-era Canon as Ghidorah was supposed to die in that film.
- Gigan appeared in episode 11. The cyborg had lost the ability to fly or use his buzzsaw, but had been given the power to cause explosions with his hooks. He fought and was briefly defeated by Godzilla, but after reviving, he was killed by Zone Fighter at the end of the episode.

== Cast ==
- Hikaru Sakimori / Zone Fighter: Kazuya Aoyama
- Hotaru Sakimori / Zone Angel: Kazumi Kitahara
- Akira Sakimori / Zone Junior: Takashi Sato
- Yoichiro Sakimori / Zone Father: Shoji Nakayama
- Tsukiko Sakimori / Zone Mother: Sachiko Kozuki
- Raita Sakimori / Zone Great: Shiro Amagusa
- Takeru Jo: Hideaki Ohara
- Voice of Gold Garoga: Munemaru Koda
- Zone Fighter (giant): Momoru Kusumi
- Garoga, Zone Fighter (life-size, dubbed) : Tatsumi Nikamoto
- Godzilla: Toru Kawai, Isao Zushi
- Gigan, King Ghidorah, Terror-Beasts: Isao Zushi
- Narrator: Kiyoshi Kobayashi
