= Barbenheimer =

2023 cultural phenomenon

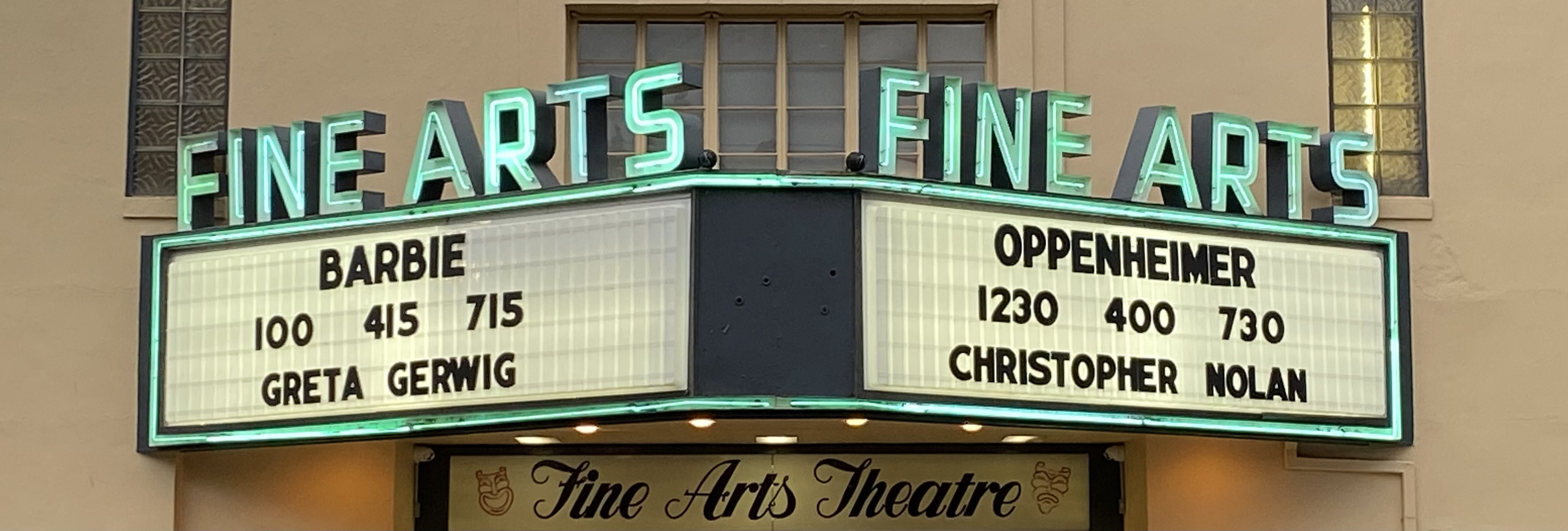
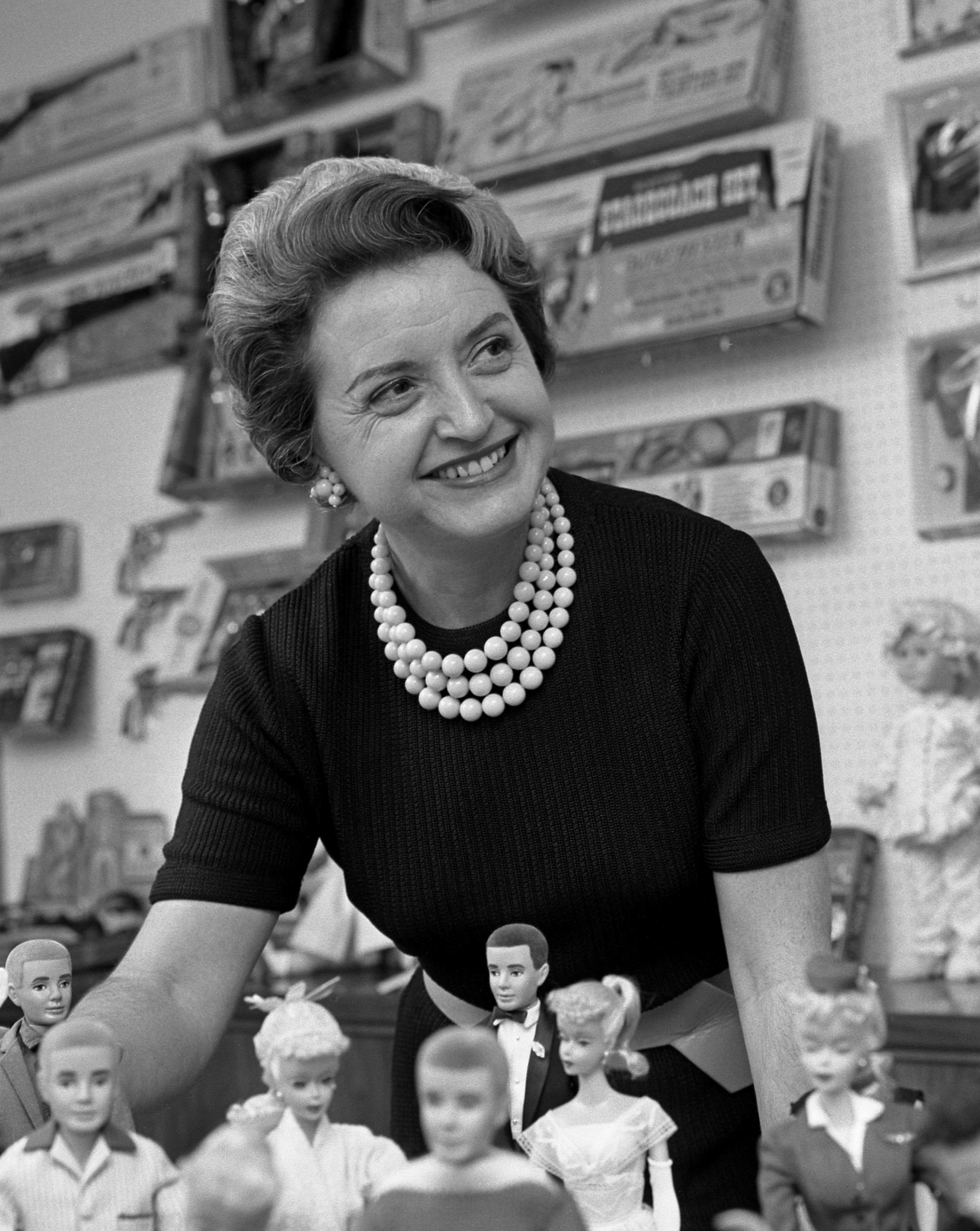
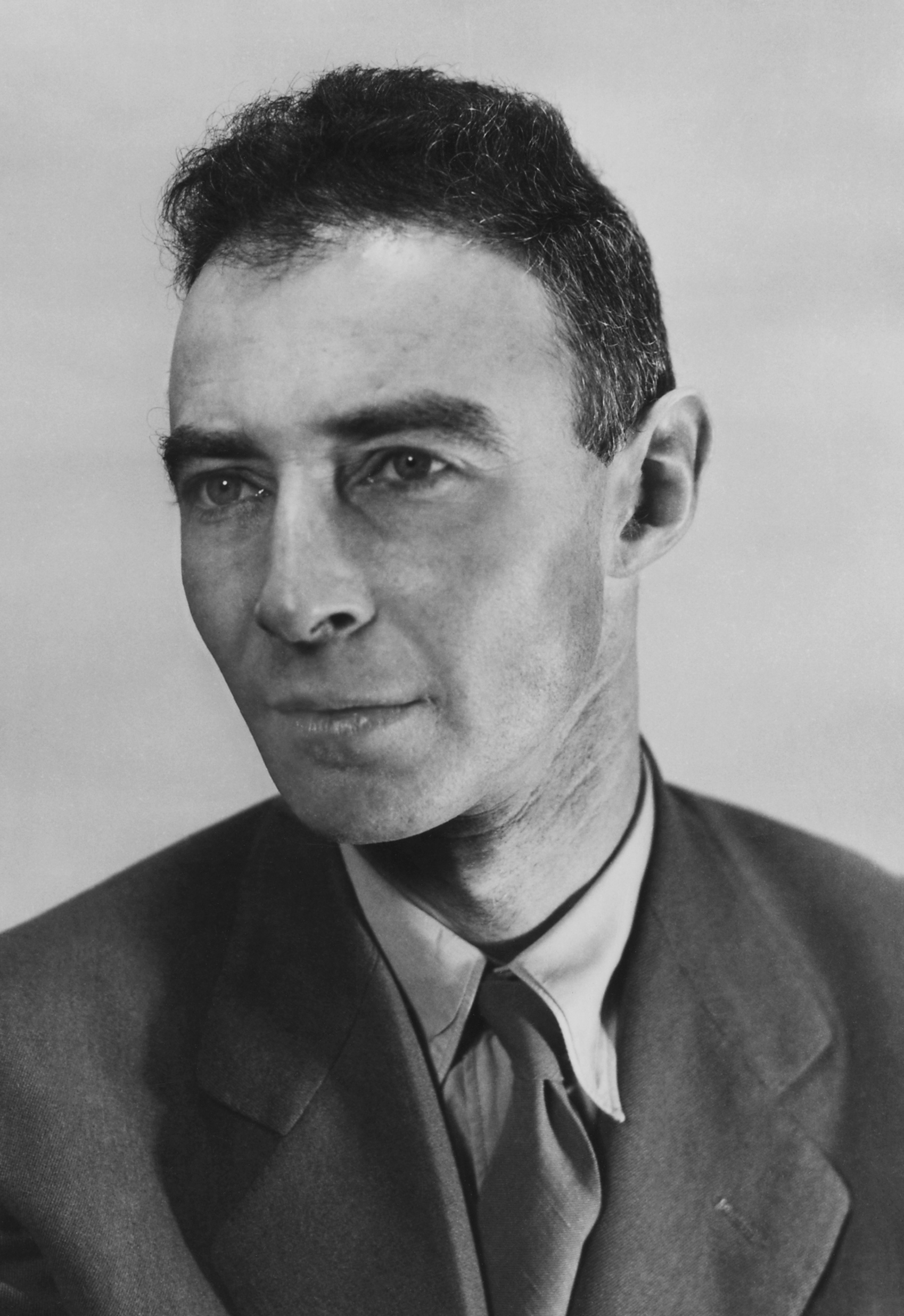
Barbie creator Ruth Handler and J. Robert Oppenheimer

Barbenheimer (/ˈbɑːrbənhaɪmər/ BAR-bən-hy-mər) (Note: Also known as Barbieheimer (/ˈbɑːrbihaɪmər/ BAR-bee-hy-mər).) was a cultural phenomenon that preceded and surrounded the simultaneous theatrical release of two major studio films—Barbie by Warner Bros. Pictures and Oppenheimer by Universal Pictures—on July 21, 2023. The dichotomy between Barbie, a fantasy comedy directed by Greta Gerwig based on the fashion doll Barbie, and Oppenheimer, a biographical thriller directed by Christopher Nolan based on the life of theoretical physicist and creator of the atomic bomb, J. Robert Oppenheimer, sparked widespread online engagement. This included the creation of memes, merchandise, and themed content across social media.

The simultaneous release was an instance of counterprogramming. As the release date approached, instead of generating a rivalry, discussion centered on the appositeness of watching the films as a double feature, as well as in which order to watch them. While the initial reaction was driven by humor about the films' contrasting styles, some commentators highlighted shared themes such as existentialism.

Both Barbie and Oppenheimer received widespread critical acclaim (Note: Attributed to multiple references:) and exceeded box-office expectations. Their joint opening weekend was the fourth-largest ever at the American box office, and both films rank among the highest-grossing films of 2023, with Barbie at the number 1 spot. Barbenheimer continued into awards season, where both films were major contenders in a wide assortment of categories. Together, they received 21 nominations at the 96th Academy Awards, including Best Picture (for which each film received a nomination), and won eight, seven of which went to Oppenheimer, also winning the top prize. Additionally, at the 66th Annual Grammy Awards, the two films received a collective amount of 15 nominations and won four trophies, three of them for Barbie, including Song of the Year for Billie Eilish's "What Was I Made For?" (which marked the first time that a song from a film had won in that category since "My Heart Will Go On" from Titanic in 1997).

== History ==
=== Release date dispute ===
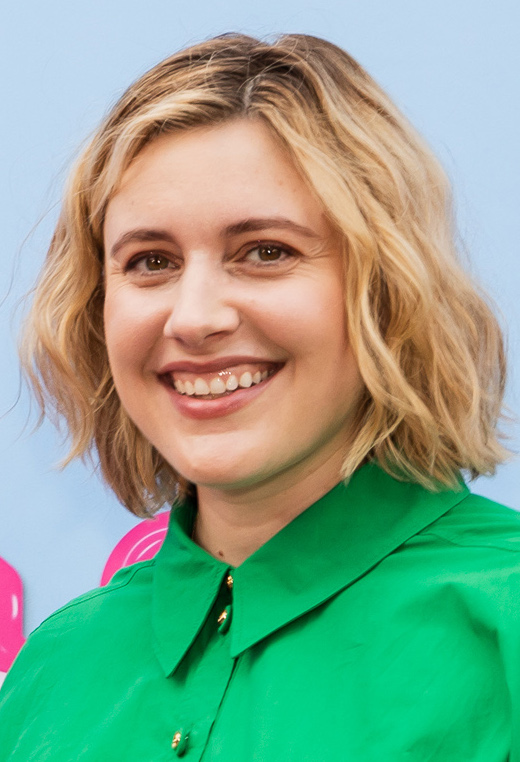
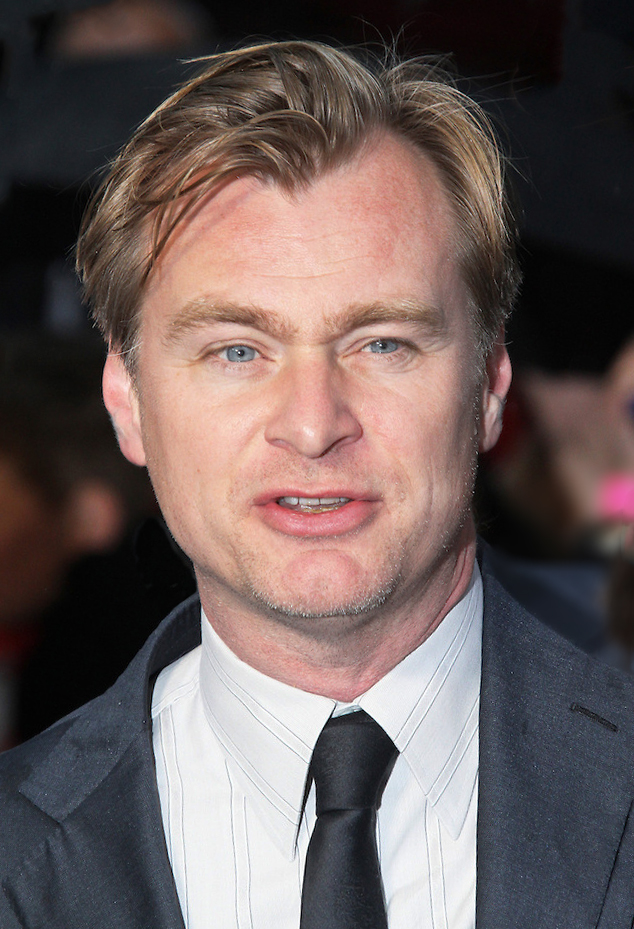
Barbie director Greta Gerwig and Oppenheimer director Christopher Nolan

In December 2020, citing the impact of the COVID-19 pandemic on cinema, WarnerMedia, the then-parent company of Warner Bros. Pictures, announced it would release all of its upcoming 2021 films exclusively on its streaming service, HBO Max, in what was nicknamed "Project Popcorn". This decision was heavily criticized the same month by director Christopher Nolan, whose films had been distributed by Warner Bros. since 2002's Insomnia. In a statement to The Hollywood Reporter, Nolan said, "Some of our industry's biggest filmmakers and most important movie stars went to bed the night before thinking they were working for the greatest movie studio and woke up to find out they were working for the worst streaming service." He also said that Warner Bros. "[doesn't] even understand what they're losing", and that the "decision [made] no economic sense". Warner Bros. eventually backed off from the streaming-exclusive releasing plan for their feature films in March 2022.

Following the announcement of Warner Bros.'s 2021 release strategy, Nolan began discussions with other studios and, in September 2021, revealed that his next project, Oppenheimer, would be distributed by Universal Pictures rather than Warner Bros. As part of the agreement with Universal, Nolan was granted a $100 million production budget, an equally sized marketing budget, full creative control, 20% of first-dollar gross revenue, a three-week blackout period before and after the film's release during which the studio would not launch competing titles, and a 100-day exclusive theatrical window to delay its streaming availability. The following month, Universal announced that Oppenheimer would premiere on July 21, 2023. Warner Bros. had initially scheduled the animated comedy Coyote vs. Acme, a film based on the Looney Tunes franchise, for the same date, but in April 2022, it announced that Barbie would instead be released on that day, putting it in direct competition with Oppenheimer.

Nolan's disagreement with Warner was cited as the principal cause of this decision. Insider speculated that positioning Barbie opposite Oppenheimer may have been a retaliatory move against Nolan for ending his long-standing collaboration with the studio. The choice of a mid-July release held particular relevance, as many of Nolan's films had premiered during that window, with few exceptions: Interstellar (which opened in November 2014 under Paramount Pictures in the U.S. and Canada, and Warner Bros. internationally) and Tenet (delayed from its original July 17, 2020, date due to the pandemic). Warner Bros.'s new leadership, Michael De Luca and Pamela Abdy, later stated that they wished to reconcile with Nolan; prompting box office analysts to question why the studio did not adjust Barbie's release date if reconciliation was the goal.

Nolan was reportedly annoyed by Warner Bros.'s decision to schedule Barbie on the same date as Oppenheimer. However, when asked by an Insider journalist if the move was a direct response to his departure from Warner Bros., Nolan laughed and declined to comment, instead stating that today's theaters face "a crowded marketplace with a lot of different movies ... and those of us who care about movies are thrilled about that." When asked about the films sharing the same release date, Nolan told an IGN reporter that a "crowded marketplace" is "here and that's terrific".

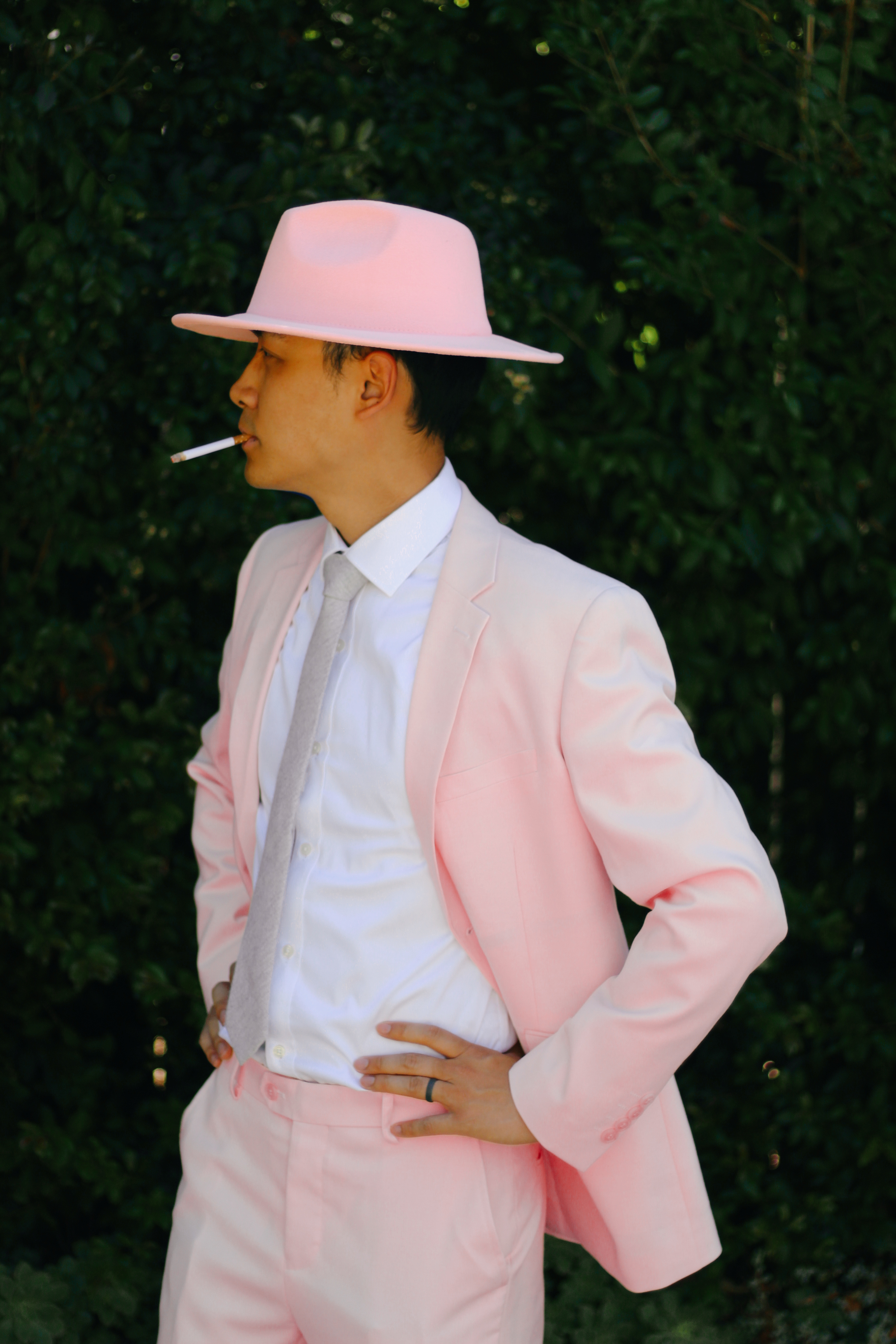
Barbenheimer-inspired Halloween costume

=== Marketing and emergence as cultural phenomenon ===
The marketing strategies for Barbie and Oppenheimer were notably different. Barbie employed an extensive campaign, reportedly costing $150 million, featuring immersive partnerships and product tie-ins. In contrast, Oppenheimer opted for a more restrained approach, using trailers and an online countdown leading to the 78th anniversary of the first nuclear test to build anticipation.

Both films held their premieres in London in July 2023: Barbie on July 12, and Oppenheimer the following day. Promotional activities were suspended due to the 2023 SAG-AFTRA strike, which began on July 14. Margot Robbie expressed support for the strike at Barbie's premiere, while Oppenheimer's cast left their screening early in solidarity, after the event was moved up by an hour. SAG-AFTRA President Fran Drescher later claimed studios had "duped" the union into extending negotiations by 12 days to allow continued promotion of major summer releases like Barbie and Oppenheimer.

The term "Barbenheimer" was first used in a tweet dated April 15, 2022, by Matt Neglia, editor-in-chief of the entertainment awards site Next Best Picture. The post humorously commented on the seemingly endless casting announcements for both Barbie and Oppenheimer, though Neglia later said he did not recall writing it. Interest in the term grew rapidly in 2023 as online users embraced the stark contrast between the two films, sharing memes and fan-made posters across social media platforms like Twitter. Etsy sellers capitalized on the trend by creating themed merchandise, including shirts that initially featured the films' official wordmarks and later adopted a Barbie-style "Barbenheimer" design.

Online users embraced Barbie and Oppenheimer as a double feature, with the debate over the ideal viewing order becoming part of the meme. Margot Robbie suggested watching Barbie, then Oppenheimer, and then Barbie again, while Issa Rae, who plays President Barbie, joked that ending with Oppenheimer might signal sociopathic tendencies. CNN Entertainment writer Scottie Andrew recommended watching Oppenheimer first and Barbie second, comparing it to "saving dessert for after dinner".

== Reception ==
=== Box office ===
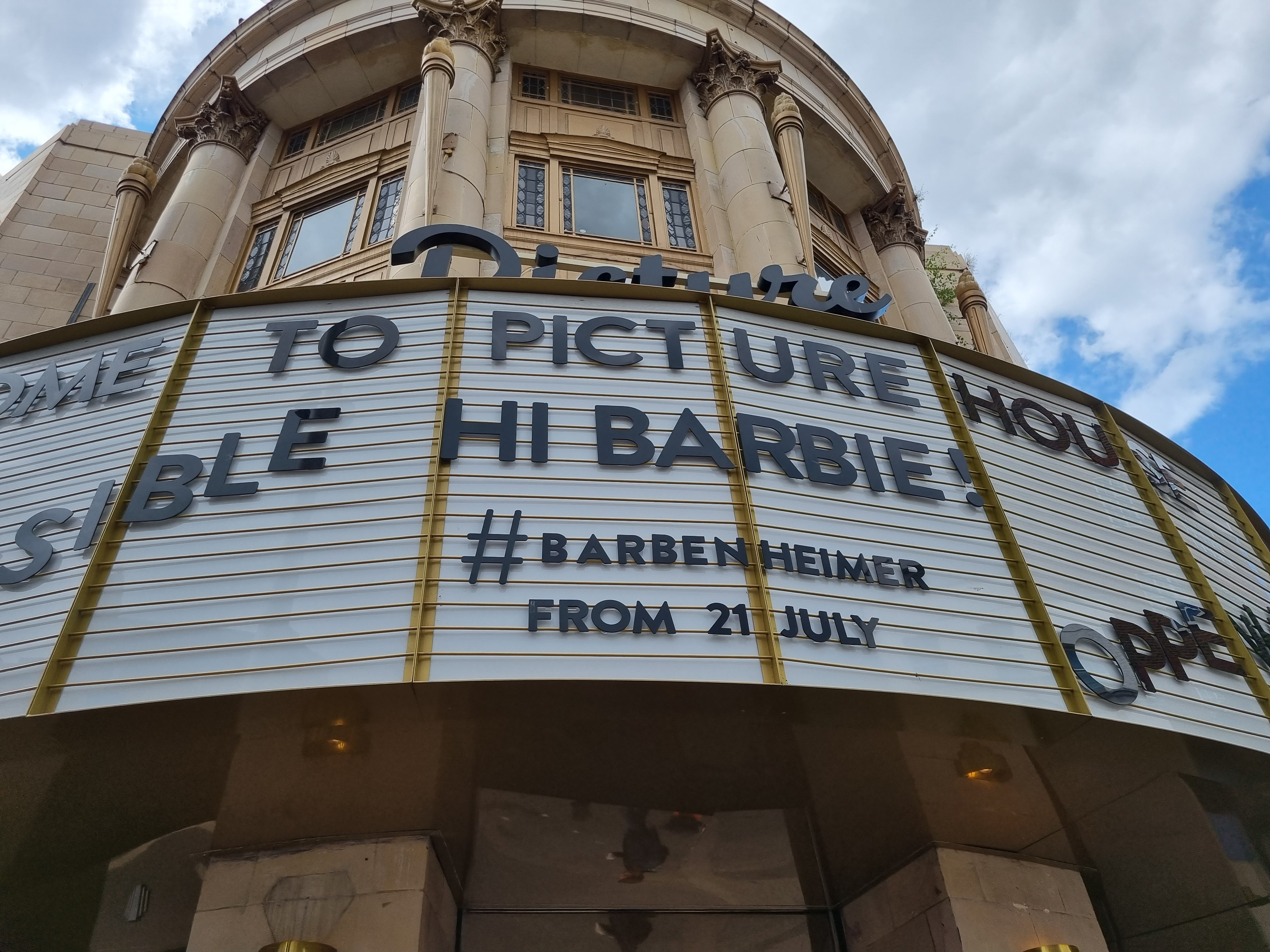
"Barbenheimer" hashtag displayed on a cinema in London

Ahead of their release, Barbie was projected to earn $90–120 million in its opening weekend, while Oppenheimer was expected to earn $45–50 million. Interest in viewing both films as a double feature grew quickly; two weeks prior to release, AMC Theatres reported that over 20,000 AMC Stubs members had pre-booked same-day tickets for both films, a 33% rise in double-feature bookings from July 7 to 10. By July 17, that figure had risen to 40,000. Vue International noted that nearly 20% of Oppenheimer ticket buyers also purchased tickets for Barbie.

Both films exceeded box-office expectations. Barbie became Warner Bros.'s highest-grossing domestic release, surpassing Nolan's own The Dark Knight, and it became the highest-grossing domestic release directed by a woman. In the U.S. and Canada, Barbie earned $22.3 million in Thursday previews, while Oppenheimer made $10.5 million. Their first-day totals rose to $70.5 million and $33 million on their first days, respectively, prompting revised weekend projections of $160 million for Barbie and $77 million for Oppenheimer. Ultimately, they debuted to $162 million and $82.4 million.

Combined, the two accounted for 79% of tickets sold that weekend, representing 18.5 million moviegoers, with Oppenheimer also earning $4.98 million from audiences who turned to it after sold-out Barbie showtimes. Despite not topping the domestic box office, Oppenheimer had the second-largest opening for a film that did not debut at number one, marginally beat by Inside Out ($90.4 million). Together, Barbie and Oppenheimer drove the July 21–23 weekend to $310.8 million in domestic revenue, the fourth-largest weekend in box office history, behind openings of Avengers: Endgame, Infinity War, and The Force Awakens.

Title	Box office gross			Budget	Ref.
Title	U.S. and Canada	Other territories	Worldwide	Budget	Ref.
Barbie	$636,238,421	$810,800,000	$1,447,038,421	$145,000,000	
Oppenheimer	$330,078,895	$645,732,438	$975,811,333	$100,000,000	
Total	$966,317,316	$1,456,532,438	$2,422,849,754	$245,000,000	

=== Critical and public response ===
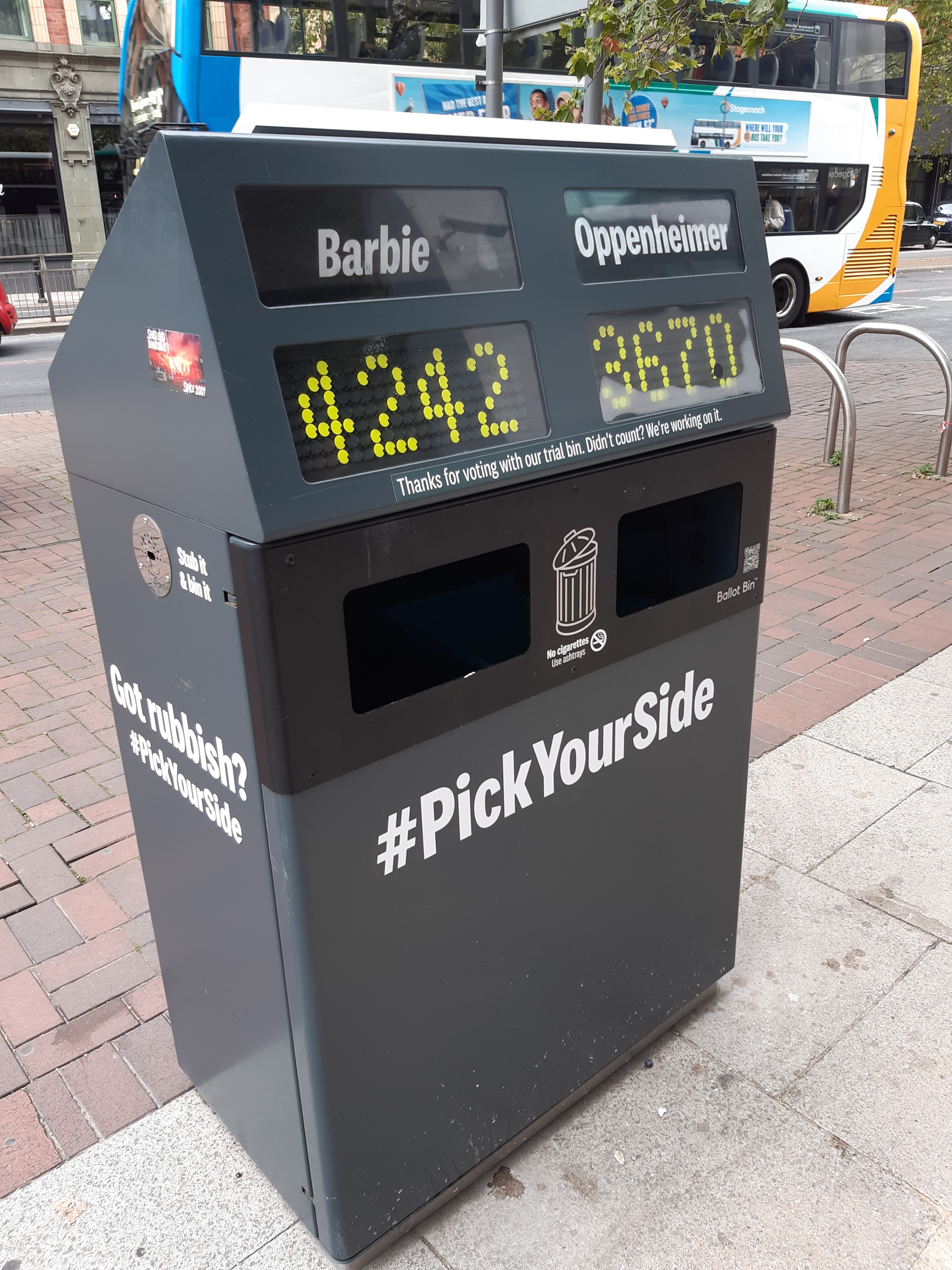
A 'ballot bin' in Manchester city centre, England, where users were encouraged to "vote" with their rubbish for either of the two films

Critics offered mixed impressions of the Barbenheimer double feature. An IndieWire reviewer who watched Oppenheimer first (with several audience members dressed in pink and one wearing a "Barbenheimer" T-shirt) said the films worked "decently" as a double feature. Conversely, a Guardian critic likened the tonal shift from Oppenheimer to Barbie to whiplash, calling it "like having your mother's funeral invaded by a flashmob of parking circus clowns." In a paired review in The New Yorker that criticized both films, Anthony Lane found similarity in performances that, in his opinion, threaten to overshadow the starring roles: "[J]ust as Downey [as Lewis Strauss] threatens to pull Nolan's film out of orbit, so, in Barbie, does Gosling [as Ken] attract a dangerous share of the dramatic energy". The review also noted that in both films, characters describe their own premise as "impossible" and "not possible."

==== Film industry response ====
In the midst of Barbenheimer, several prominent figures in the film industry expressed support for seeing both films as a double feature. Tom Cruise, following the success of Top Gun: Maverick, promoted the idea by sharing photos of himself and Mission: Impossible – Dead Reckoning Part One director Christopher McQuarrie holding tickets to both films. In a similar gesture, Barbie director Greta Gerwig and star Margot Robbie were photographed holding tickets to Oppenheimer and Mission: Impossible – Dead Reckoning Part One. However, Cruise continued to prioritize promotion of Mission: Impossible – Dead Reckoning Part One, which competed with Oppenheimer for IMAX screenings.

Oppenheimer stars Cillian Murphy and Matt Damon encouraged audiences to see both films at the same time, with the latter telling Vanity Fair that audiences are "allowed to go see two movies in a weekend". Similarly, directors Francis Ford Coppola and Martin Scorsese received Barbenheimer positively, with Coppola calling the box office success of both films "a victory for cinema" and Scorsese describing the event as a "perfect storm" that offered hope for a "different cinema to emerge". At the London premiere of Barbie, Margot Robbie expressed enthusiasm for the trend, saying she wanted a Barbenheimer shirt signed by Murphy.

==== Backlash in Japan ====
Barbenheimer sparked negative reactions in Japan, where Oppenheimer attracted controversy due to its title character's role in the atomic bombings of Hiroshima and Nagasaki. The film was not released in Japan until March 29, 2024. Controversy intensified when the official U.S. Barbie Twitter account (@barbiethemovie) reacted positively to fan-made images combining Barbie with atomic bomb imagery, including mushroom clouds and slogans like "It will be a blast." These posts were widely condemned in Japan, where such imagery is considered inappropriate for casual or humorous use, especially given the timing, which coincided with the 78th anniversaries of the bombings. Barbie was released in Japan on August 11, 2023, just two days after the anniversary of the Nagasaki bombing.

The backlash included a Change.org petition demanding an apology, which gathered over 22,600 signatures, and the hashtag #NoBarbenheimer trended with over 100,000 retweets. In protest, some Japanese users created Barbenheimer-style memes using imagery from the September 11 attacks to highlight perceived insensitivity, though this approach was seen as having backfired due to some Americans' openness to 9/11-related humor. On July 31, 2023 (JST), Warner Bros. Japan issued a statement criticizing its American counterpart and calling for appropriate action. Later that day (PST), Warner Bros. headquarters expressed regret for the "insensitive social media engagement" and offered a public apology; the original posts were reportedly deleted soon after. Mitsuki Takahata, who provides the voice of Barbie in the Japanese dub of the film, also expressed disappointment on Instagram and considered withdrawing from a planned promotional event on August 11.

=== Accolades ===
Variety and IndieWire projected both films to be Oscar contenders, including several categories which could pit both films against each other. Oppenheimer received the most nominations of any film that year with 13, ahead of Barbie's eight, overlapping in six categories: Best Picture, Best Supporting Actor, Best Supporting Actress, Best Adapted Screenplay, Best Costume Design and Best Production Design. Oppenheimer would go on to win the most Oscars of any film that year, with seven, while the lone win for Barbie was for Best Song for "What Was I Made For?", making Eilish the youngest person in history to win 2 Oscars in any category (due to her previous win in the same category for James Bond's film No Time To Die's theme song of the same name).

Oscar Categories
Oscar Categories	Barbie	Oppenheimer
Best Picture	David Heyman, Margot Robbie, Tom Ackerley and Robbie Brenner	Emma Thomas, Charles Roven and Christopher Nolan
Best Director		Christopher Nolan
Best Actor		Cillian Murphy as J. Robert Oppenheimer
Best Supporting Actor	Ryan Gosling as Ken	Robert Downey Jr. as Lewis Strauss
Best Supporting Actress	America Ferrera as Gloria	Emily Blunt as Kitty Oppenheimer
Best Adapted Screenplay	Greta Gerwig and Noah Baumbach; based on characters created by Ruth Handler	Christopher Nolan; based on the biography American Prometheus by Kai Bird and Martin J. Sherwin
Best Cinematography		Hoyte van Hoytema
Best Editing		Jennifer Lame
Best Costume Design	Jacqueline Durran	Ellen Mirojnick
Best Production Design	Sarah Greenwood (production design); Katie Spencer (set decoration)	Ruth De Jong (production design); Claire Kaufman (set decoration)
Best Makeup and Hairstyling		Luisa Abel
Best Sound		Willie Burton, Richard King, Kevin O'Connell, and Gary A. Rizzo
Best Original Score		Ludwig Göransson
Best Original Song	"I'm Just Ken" (music and lyrics by Mark Ronson and Andrew Wyatt)	
Best Original Song	"What Was I Made For?" (music and lyrics by Billie Eilish and Finneas O'Connell)	

Both films received nominations at the 81st Golden Globe Awards, with Barbie receiving nine nominations and Oppenheimer trailing with eight. Oppenheimer won five Golden Globes including Best Drama, Director and Actor, while Barbie won two, Best Cinematic and Box Office Achievement and Song. Both films also received nominations at the 29th Critics' Choice Awards with Barbie receiving a record-breaking 18 and Oppenheimer securing 13 nominations, tied for second most with Yorgos Lanthimos's Victorian-era black comedy Poor Things. Oppenheimer walked away with eight awards, the most of the night, including Best Picture and Best Director. Barbie secured six wins, including Best Original Screenplay and Best Comedy, and America Ferrera, one of the film's actors, received the #SeeHer Award. Nominations were also given at the 30th Screen Actors Guild Awards, with both films receiving four nods.

== Analysis and legacy ==
=== Analysis ===
The Economist observed that Barbie and Oppenheimer reflect the contrasting forces in modern cinema: an IP-driven, escapist comedy projected to double the opening gross of a realist, standalone drama. It linked this contrast to rising nuclear anxieties following geopolitical developments, suggesting that audiences gravitate toward lighter fare like Barbie over weighty themes like those in Oppenheimer, a pattern seen throughout American film history. Paul Dergarabedian of Comscore called Barbenheimer an unprecedented event, observing that rather than competing, the films complemented each other. He believed the phenomenon attracted diverse demographics: older viewers drawn to Oppenheimer through traditional media, and younger audiences flocking to Barbie due to its high "fear of missing out" factor. Philosopher Slavoj Žižek argued in The New Statesman that both protagonists attempt to escape fantasy only to find reality itself grounded in illusion.

Writing for The Escapist, critic Darren Mooney also found similarities between the two films, noting that both "are about the relationship that exists between imagination and reality, as well as about what happens when ideas begin to manifest themselves in the corporeal world. In both cases, the results are fundamentally terrifying, although the movies reach decidedly different conclusions." Sonia Rao of The Washington Post pointed to a shared focus on "the corruptibility of men", while Tyler Austin Harper argued both films engage with the Anthropocene, reflecting on enduring legacies of militarism and consumption. Emily Zemler of The Observer drew attention to each film's critique of power, self-awareness, and existential complexity, noting Barbie's feminist messaging delivered through joy rather than despair.

Analysts also saw the films' box office success as signaling demand for originality. Jake Coyle of the Associated Press suggested it followed audience fatigue with recent franchise failures like The Flash and Indiana Jones and the Dial of Destiny. IndieWire's Eric Kohn echoed this, urging studios to invest in visionary filmmakers rather than trying to recreate Barbenheimer's success formula. Meanwhile, German journalists Larissa Kuhnert and Thomas Koch suggested the phenomenon's virality may have been driven by coordinated marketing efforts, possibly involving astroturfing or strategic planning by Mattel.

=== Comparisons and legacy ===
Barbenheimer is an instance of counterprogramming, a marketing strategy in which a tonally different film is released on the same day as a major film to appeal to an underrepresented group. It drew parallels to the same American release date of The Dark Knight (distributed by Warner Bros.) and the jukebox musical Mamma Mia! (distributed by Universal) on July 18, 2008. It has also seen comparisons to the simultaneous release of the video game titles Animal Crossing: New Horizons and Doom Eternal on March 20, 2020, which prompted a similar online crossover phenomenon known as "Doom Crossing" at the time. The trend also appeared with the series finales of the television series Nancy Drew and Riverdale, both of which aired on August 23, 2023, on The CW. Its success prompted studios to create similar events, including "Saw Patrol" (Saw X and Paw Patrol: The Mighty Movie), released on September 29, 2023, and "Garfuriosa" (The Garfield Movie and Furiosa: A Mad Max Saga), released on May 24, 2024, though these were met with more mixed results.

Additionally, in July 2024, Universal rescheduled the first part of its Wicked adaptation to November 22 to avoid competing with Moana 2, placing it in direct competition with Paramount's Gladiator II. This prompted comparisons to Barbenheimer, with Paul Mescal, star of Gladiator II, referring to the pairing as "Glicked" and supporting a double feature. Boxoffice Pro projected that Wicked would top the box office, earning at least $100 million in its opening weekend, while Gladiator II was expected to earn up to $80 million. Although both films received generally positive reviews, their box office openings—$112.5 million for Wicked and $55 million for Gladiator II—fell short of these projections as well as the scale set by Barbenheimer. Conversely, Universal moved The Exorcist: Believer up a week from its intended October 13, 2023, date to avoid competition with Taylor Swift: The Eras Tour and prevent an "Exorswift" release schedule. Grand Theft Auto VI and the 2026 remake of The Legend of Zelda: Ocarina of Time releasing within weeks of each other in November that year has been dubbed as the video game industry's "Barbenheimer moment" or another "Doom Crossing" moment.

After Avengers: Doomsday and Dune: Part Three were both scheduled for release on December 18, 2026, some fans online began using the term "Dunesday", inspired by Barbenheimer. Several other attempts to recreate Barbenheimer for same-day releases had been made, and it was unclear if "Dunesday" would catch on or have the same impact. The two films' lead actors, Robert Downey Jr. and Timothée Chalamet, endorsed the term, which was used by several outlets discussing the two films' box office potential. At CinemaCon in April 2026, Disney announced that Doomsday would receive the company's Infinity Vision certification for PLFs, which is intended to inform audiences which theaters offer "the biggest, brightest, and most immersive cinematic experiences" and meet certain technical standards. Many commentators felt Infinity Vision was created in response to Doomsday not being able to open in IMAX theaters in the U.S. due to Dune: Part Three having exclusive rights to those for at least three weeks. In his list of CinemaCon winners and losers, Hibberd described the Infinity Vision announcement as "marketing bullshit" and predicted that the label would not be mentioned again after Doomsday's release.

== See also ==
- 2023 in film
- Postmodernist film
- Twin films
