= Counterprogramming =

Counterprogramming can refer to two similar activities in the media industry:

- Counterprogramming (film distribution), a studio's marketing strategy to appeal to audiences not targeted by other films
- Counterprogramming (television), offering programs to attract an audience from another station
