= List of box office records set by Avatar =

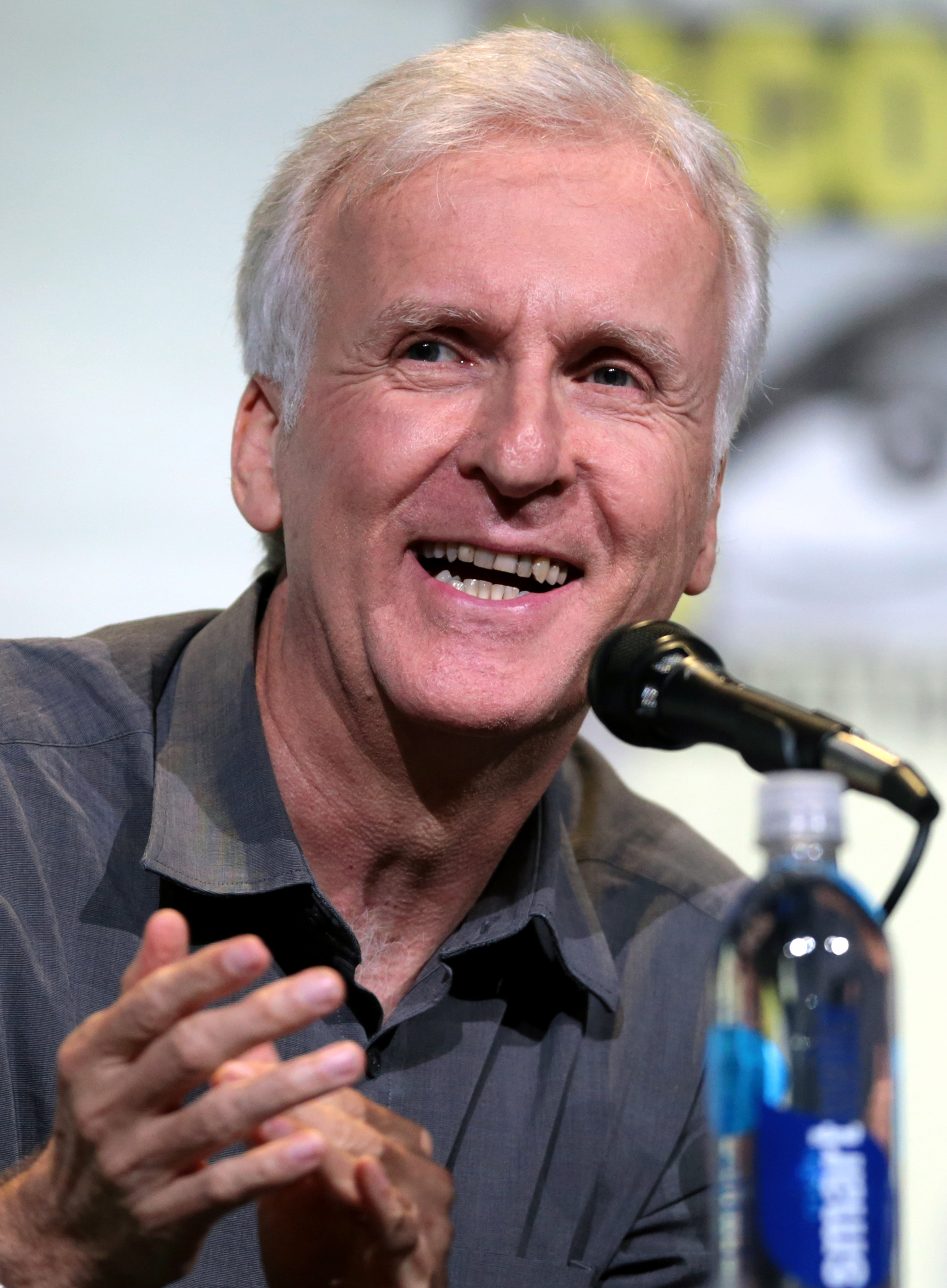
James Cameron (pictured in 2016) wrote, directed, and produced Avatar.

Avatar was released in December 2009 and went on to break multiple box office records in various markets. Worldwide, it became the highest-grossing film of all time and the fastest film to gross $1 billion through $2.5 billion, (Note: Attributed to multiple references:) while also achieving the highest grosses in both the 3D and IMAX formats. In its domestic market of the United States and Canada, it set the records for the highest-grossing film and the highest-grossing second through seventh weekends, (Note: Attributed to multiple references:) as well as becoming the fastest film to gross $500 million through $750 million. (Note: Attributed to multiple references:) Elsewhere, it became the highest-grossing film of all time in over 30 markets including China, Hong Kong, (Note: Attributed to multiple references:) Romania, South Korea, Taiwan, and the United Kingdom.

Box office analysts identified several factors contributing to the film's success. Among these were the relative lack of competition owing to the release date, a marketing strategy that emphasized the novelty of the cinematic experience which led viewers to watch it in the theater rather than at home, positive word of mouth and repeat viewings increasing the film's staying power in theaters, an ability to attract audiences across the globe, and higher ticket prices from 3D and IMAX showings. (Note: Attributed to multiple references:) Many of the records set by the film are listed below. Pre-Avatar records and new records surpassing Avatar are presented where available and applicable. All grosses are given in unadjusted US dollars, except where noted otherwise.

== Worldwide ==
Avatar set the worldwide record for the highest gross of all time, surpassing the previous record by more than 50%, and grossed $2 billion in less time than it had taken the previous fastest-grossing film to gross half as much. The film also exceeded the previous record for highest gross in the IMAX format by a factor of more than three.

Record	Figure	Previous record holder	Surpassed by	Notes
Highest-grossing film	$2.789 billion	Titanic – $1.84 billion	Avengers: Endgame – $2.797 billion	It became the highest-grossing film in history on January 25, 2010, after 41 days of release, (Note: Attributed to multiple references:) and had become the second-highest-grossing film worldwide 20 days after its initial release.
Highest-grossing film	$2.923 billion	Avengers: Endgame – $2.797 billion	Avengers: Endgame – $2.925 billion	After relinquishing the record to Avengers: Endgame in July 2019, Avatar reclaimed it in March 2021 with a re-release in China. Endgame reclaimed the record in October 2026 with a global re-release.
Highest-grossing non-sequel	$2.923 billion	Titanic – $1.84 billion	—N/a	
Highest-grossing science fiction film	$2.923 billion	Star Wars: Episode I – The Phantom Menace – $924 million	—N/a	
Highest-grossing 2009 release	$2.74 billion	—N/a	—N/a	It was the only 2009 release to gross more than $1 billion.
Highest 3D gross	$1.35 billion	—N/a	—N/a	
Highest IMAX gross	$270 million	The Polar Express – $71 million	The Odyssey – $289 million	
Fastest film to gross $1 billion	19 days	Pirates of the Caribbean: Dead Man's Chest – 63 days	Furious 7 – 17 days	
Fastest film to gross $1.5 billion	32 days	Titanic (see note)	Star Wars: The Force Awakens – 19 days	Titanic reached $1 billion on March 1, 1998 after 74 days of release, and had reached approximately $1.7 billion by June 23, 1998, i.e. after 188 days of release.
Fastest film to gross $2 billion	47 days	It was the first film to reach that gross.	Avengers: Endgame – 11 days	
Fastest film to gross $2.5 billion	72 days	It was the first film to reach that gross.	Avengers: Endgame – 20 days (see note)	Outside of the US and Canada, the gross was $1,839.0 million as of February 28, 2010 and the weekend gross for February 26–28, 2010 was $30.6 million, giving a gross of $1,808.4 million as of February 25, 2010. Adding to that the US and Canada gross of $692.9 million as of February 25, 2010 gives a worldwide gross of $2.501 billion as of February 25, 2010. Endgame was released on April 24, 2019, and the gross as of May 13, 2019 was $1,774.7 million outside of the US and Canada and $728.4 million in the US and Canada for a worldwide gross of $2.503 billion.
Highest opening weekend gross for a non-franchise, non-sequel	$242 million	2012 – $230 million	—N/a	
Fastest to $100 million in IMAX ticket sales	30 days	It was the first film to reach this gross.	Jurassic World – 18 days	
Fastest to $150 million in IMAX ticket sales	47 days	It was the first film to reach this gross.	Star Wars: The Force Awakens – 19 days	
Fastest to $200 million in IMAX ticket sales	68 days	It was the first film to reach this gross.	Star Wars: The Force Awakens – 35 days	
Widest IMAX release	261 theaters	—N/a	Alice in Wonderland – 270 theaters	Of these, 178 were in the US and Canada. For Alice in Wonderland, 188 were in the US and Canada.
Highest fourth-weekend IMAX gross	$12.2 million	—N/a	Star Wars: The Force Awakens – $19 million	

== United States and Canada ==
In the domestic market, Avatar set the record for the highest-grossing film of all time as well as several weekend records. It also set speed records for grosses at and above $500 million, and had the widest IMAX and 3D releases of any film up to that time.

Record	Figure	Previous record holder	Surpassed by	Notes
Highest-grossing film	$760 million	Titanic – $600 million	Star Wars: The Force Awakens – $936 million	It passed Titanic's gross in 47 days.
Highest-grossing non-sequel	$785 million	Titanic – $600 million	—N/a	
Highest-grossing 2009 release	$749 million	—N/a	—N/a	
Highest gross during the 2010 calendar year	$466 million	—N/a	—N/a	
Highest IMAX gross	$140 million	—N/a	—N/a	
Fastest to $500 million	32 days	The Dark Knight – 45 days	The Avengers – 23 days	It grossed $504 million in that time.
Fastest to $550 million	38 days	Titanic – 121 days	The Avengers – 31 days	It grossed $551 million in that time.
Fastest to $600 million	47 days	Titanic – 255 days	Jurassic World – 36 days	It grossed $601 million in that time.
Fastest to $650 million	58 days	It was the first film to reach that gross.	Star Wars: The Force Awakens – 14 days	It grossed $651 million in that time.
Fastest to $700 million	72 days	It was the first film to reach that gross.	Star Wars: The Force Awakens – 16 days	It grossed $702 million in that time.
Fastest to $750 million	253 days	It was the first film to reach that gross.	Star Wars: The Force Awakens – 18 days	It grossed $750 million in that time.
Highest 2nd weekend gross	$75.6 million	The Dark Knight – $75.1 million	The Avengers – $103 million	
Highest 3rd weekend gross	$68.4 million	Spider-Man – $45.0 million	Star Wars: The Force Awakens – $90.2 million	
Highest 4th weekend gross	$50.3 million	Titanic – $28.7 million	—N/a	
Highest 5th weekend gross	$42.7 million	Titanic – $30.0 million	—N/a	
Highest 6th weekend gross	$34.9 million	Titanic – $25.2 million	—N/a	
Highest 7th weekend gross	$31.2 million	Titanic – $25.9 million	—N/a	
Highest 37th weekend gross	$4.0 million	My Big Fat Greek Wedding – $2.7 million	—N/a	
Highest Christmas weekend gross	$75.6 million	The Lord of the Rings: The Return of the King – $50.5 million	Star Wars: The Force Awakens – $149 million	In 2009. The Return of the King was in 2003. The Force Awakens was in 2015.
Highest Martin Luther King weekend 4-day gross	$54.4 million	Cloverfield – $46.1 million	American Sniper – $107 million	In 2010. Cloverfield was in 2008. American Sniper was in 2015.
Highest Martin Luther King weekend 3-day gross	$42.7 million	Cloverfield – $40.0 million	American Sniper – $89.2 million	
Highest January weekend gross	$68.4 million	Cloverfield – $40.0 million	American Sniper – $89.2 million	
Highest opening weekend gross for an original film	$77 million	The Incredibles – $70 million	Inside Out – $91 million	
Highest opening weekend IMAX gross	$9.5 million	Star Trek – $8.5 million	Alice in Wonderland – $12.2 million	
Highest opening weekend 3D gross	$55 million	Up – $35.4 million	Alice in Wonderland – $81.3 million	
Highest Christmas Eve gross	$11.2 million	The Lord of the Rings: The Two Towers – $7.7 million	Star Wars: The Force Awakens – $27.1 million	In 2009. The Two Towers was in 2002. The Force Awakens was in 2015.
Highest New Year's Day gross	$25.2 million	Meet the Fockers – $18.2 million	Star Wars: The Force Awakens – $34.3 million	In 2010. Meet the Fockers was in 2005. The Force Awakens was in 2016.
Highest January single-day gross	$25.2 million $25.8 million	Meet the Fockers – $18.2 million	American Sniper – $30.3 million	On January 1 and then January 2, 2010. For Meet the Fockers, it was January 1, 2005. For American Sniper, it was January 16, 2015.
Highest second Tuesday gross	$18.2 million	The Lord of the Rings: The Fellowship of the Ring – $10.2 million	Star Wars: The Force Awakens – $29.5 million	On December 29, 2009. For The Fellowship of the Ring, it was January 1, 2002. For The Force Awakens, it was December 29, 2015.
Highest second Wednesday gross	$18.4 million	The Lord of the Rings: The Two Towers – $12.3 million	Star Wars: The Force Awakens – $28.0 million	On December 30, 2009. For The Two Towers, it was December 25, 2002. For The Force Awakens, it was December 30, 2015.
Number one film of the highest-grossing single aggregated weekend	$269 million	July 18–20, 2008 – $260 million	June 12–14, 2015 – $273 million	The figure represents the combined gross of all films in theaters on the weekend of December 25–27, 2009. Avatar grossed 28.0%. The Dark Knight grossed 60.7% of the previous record. Jurassic World grossed 76.2% of the record that surpassed Avatar's.
Number one film of the highest-grossing aggregated December	$1.06 billion	December 2007 – $993 million	December 2015 – 1.30 billion	The figure represents the combined gross of all films in theaters in December 2009. Avatar grossed 26.6%. I Am Legend comprised 20.1% of December 2007's gross. Star Wars: The Force Awakens comprised 50.0% of December 2015's gross.
Number one film of the highest-grossing aggregated January	$1.05 billion	January 2009 – $1.01 billion	—N/a	The figure represents the combined gross of all films in theaters in January 2010. Avatar grossed 29.5%. Gran Torino comprised 10.2% of January 2009's gross.
Widest 3D release	2,038 theaters	—N/a	Alice in Wonderland – 2,251 theaters	
Widest IMAX release	178 theaters	Star Trek – 138 theaters	Alice in Wonderland – 188 theaters	
Smallest second weekend drop for a film opening over $50 million	down 1.8%	How the Grinch Stole Christmas – down 5.4%	—N/a	
Highest-grossing film in any single December	$283 million	The Lord of the Rings: The Return of the King – $249 million	Star Wars: The Force Awakens – $652 million	
Highest-grossing film in any single January	$312 million	Titanic – $188 million	—N/a	

== Other territories ==
Avatar became the highest-grossing film of all time in more than 30 markets spanning all six continents (not counting Antarctica). Data on precise figures, previous record holders, and surpassed records is limited due to the absence of box office record trackers for these markets.

Record	Territory	Figure	Previous record holder	Surpassed by	Notes
Highest-grossing film	Outside of the US and Canada	$2.12 billion	Titanic – $1.24 billion	—N/a	It surpassed Titanic's record on January 23, 2010, after 39 days of release.
Highest-grossing non-sequel	Outside of the US and Canada	$2.12 billion	Titanic – $1.24 billion	—N/a	
Fastest to $1 billion	Outside of the US and Canada	28 days	Titanic (see note)	Avengers: Infinity War – 19 days (see note)	Titanic took four times as long. Infinity War was released on April 25, 2018 and had grossed $1.059 billion outside of the US and Canada market as of May 13, 2018.
Highest single day IMAX gross	Outside of the US and Canada	$1.4 million $1.6 million	—N/a	Harry Potter and the Deathly Hallows – Part 2 (see note)	On Saturday, January 2 and then Saturday, January 9, 2010. Deathly Hallows 2 grossed $8 million on its opening weekend July 15–17, 2011 for an average over $2.6 million per day.
Highest December opening weekend gross	Outside of the US and Canada	$164 million	—N/a	Star Wars: The Force Awakens – $281 million	
Highest 4th week gross	Outside of the US and Canada	$150 million	—N/a	—N/a	
Highest 5th week gross	Outside of the US and Canada	$128 million	—N/a	—N/a	
Highest 6th week gross	Outside of the US and Canada	$108 million	—N/a	—N/a	
Highest-grossing film of all time	Australia (Note: Attributed to multiple references:)	$105 million	Titanic – $70.5 million	—N/a	It was the top-grossing film of all time in 24 markets after 41 days of release.
Highest-grossing film of all time	Bahrain	$896 thousand	—N/a	—N/a	It was the top-grossing film of all time in 24 markets after 41 days of release.
Highest-grossing film of all time	Brazil	$58.2 million	—N/a	Elite Squad: The Enemy Within – $62.9 million	It was the top-grossing film of all time in 24 markets after 41 days of release.
Highest-grossing film of all time	Bulgaria	$3.4 million	—N/a	Avatar: The Way of Water	It was the top-grossing film of all time in 24 markets after 41 days of release.
Highest-grossing film of all time	Chile	$10.4 million	—N/a	Ice Age: Continental Drift – $13.7 million	It was the top-grossing film of all time in 24 markets after 41 days of release.
Highest-grossing film of all time	China	$204 million	2012 – $67.5 million	Transformers: Age of Extinction – $320 million	It was the top-grossing film of all time in 24 markets after 41 days of release.
Highest-grossing film of all time	Colombia	$13.6 million	—N/a	Ice Age: Continental Drift – $14.0 million	It was the top-grossing film of all time in 24 markets after 41 days of release.
Highest-grossing film of all time	Czech Republic	$12.4 million	—N/a	Avatar: The Way of Water	It was the top-grossing film of all time in 24 markets after 41 days of release.
Highest-grossing film of all time	Dominican Republic	$1.3 million	—N/a	—N/a	It was the top-grossing film of all time in 24 markets after 41 days of release.
Highest-grossing film of all time	East and West Africa	$844 thousand	—N/a	—N/a	It was the top-grossing film of all time in 24 markets after 41 days of release.
Highest-grossing film of all time	Hong Kong	$22.9 million	Titanic – $15.1 million	Avengers: Endgame – $29.3 million	It was the top-grossing film of all time in 24 markets after 41 days of release.
Highest-grossing film of all time	Hungary	$7.3 million	—N/a	Avatar: The Way of Water	It was the top-grossing film of all time in 24 markets after 41 days of release.
Highest-grossing film of all time	Italy	83.4 million	—N/a	—N/a	It was the top-grossing film of all time in 24 markets after 41 days of release.
Highest-grossing film of all time	Jamaica	$476 thousand	—N/a	—N/a	It was the top-grossing film of all time in 24 markets after 41 days of release.
Highest-grossing film of all time	Jordan	$752 thousand	—N/a	—N/a	It was the top-grossing film of all time in 24 markets after 41 days of release.
Highest-grossing film of all time	Latvia	$1.4 million	—N/a	Avatar: The Way of Water	It was the top-grossing film of all time in 24 markets after 41 days of release.
Highest-grossing film of all time	Mexico	$44.2 million	Ice Age: The Meltdown – $29.4 million	Toy Story 3 – $59.3 million	It was the top-grossing film of all time in 24 markets after 41 days of release.
Highest-grossing film of all time	New Zealand	$12.5 million	The Lord of the Rings: The Fellowship of the Ring	Avatar: The Way of Water	It was the top-grossing film of all time in 24 markets after 41 days of release.
Highest-grossing film of all time	Portugal	$9.2 million	—N/a	Avatar: The Way of Water	It was the top-grossing film of all time in 24 markets after 41 days of release.
Highest-grossing film of all time	Qatar	$883 thousand	—N/a	—N/a	It was the top-grossing film of all time in 24 markets after 41 days of release.
Highest-grossing film of all time	Romania	$5.5 million	—N/a	Avatar: The Way of Water	It was the top-grossing film of all time in 24 markets after 41 days of release.
Highest-grossing film of all time	Russia	$117 million	The Irony of Fate 2 – $50 million	—N/a	It was the top-grossing film of all time in 24 markets after 41 days of release.
Highest-grossing film of all time	Serbia	$1.3 million	—N/a	Montevideo, God Bless You! – $2.1 million	It was the top-grossing film of all time in 24 markets after 41 days of release.
Highest-grossing film of all time	Singapore	$8.1 million	—N/a	Transformers: Dark of the Moon – $9.1 million	It was the top-grossing film of all time in 24 markets after 41 days of release.
Highest-grossing film of all time	Slovenia	$1.8 million	—N/a	Avatar: The Way of Water	It was the top-grossing film of all time in 24 markets after 41 days of release.
Highest-grossing film of all time	South Korea	$111 million	Tidal Wave – $67.9 million	The Admiral: Roaring Currents – $131 million	It was the top-grossing film of all time in 24 markets after 41 days of release.
Highest-grossing film of all time	Spain	$109 million	—N/a	—N/a	It was the top-grossing film of all time in 24 markets after 41 days of release.
Highest-grossing film of all time	Taiwan	$13.6 million	Titanic	Transformers: Dark of the Moon – $37.6 million	It was the top-grossing film of all time in 24 markets after 41 days of release.
Highest-grossing film of all time	Ukraine	$8.6 million	—N/a	—N/a	It was the top-grossing film of all time in 24 markets after 41 days of release.
Highest-grossing film of all time	United Arab Emirates	$7.3 million	—N/a	The Jungle Book – $9.1 million	It was the top-grossing film of all time in 24 markets after 41 days of release.
Highest-grossing film of all time	United Kingdom	$150 million	—N/a	Skyfall – $161 million	It was the top-grossing film of all time in 24 markets after 41 days of release.
Highest opening weekend gross	Belgium	$1.6 million	—N/a	The Twilight Saga: Eclipse – $2.3 million	
Highest opening weekend gross	Dominican Republic	—N/a	—N/a	—N/a	
Highest opening weekend gross	Italy	$15.2 million	—N/a	Sole a catinelle – $25.0 million	
Highest opening weekend gross	Romania	$521 thousand	—N/a	Pirates of the Caribbean: On Stranger Tides – $572 thousand	
Highest opening day gross	Hong Kong	HK$2.6 million	—N/a	3D Sex & Zen – HK$2.7 million	
Highest weekday opening gross	China	$5 million	—N/a	Pacific Rim – $9 million	On Monday, January 4, 2010. Pacific Rim opened on Wednesday, July 31, 2013.
Highest opening week gross	China	$41.4 million	—N/a	Transformers: Dark of the Moon – $56+ million	Dark of the Moon grossed $56 million on its opening weekend; figures for the entire opening week are not available.
Highest single-day gross	China	$8.3 million	—N/a	Pacific Rim – $9 million	On Saturday, January 9, 2010. For Pacific Rim, it was Wednesday, July 31, 2013 – its opening day.
Highest IMAX opening weekend gross	Poland	—N/a	—N/a	—N/a	
Highest IMAX opening weekend gross	Japan	—N/a	—N/a	Star Wars: The Force Awakens	
