= Finding Dory =

2016 film by Andrew Stanton

- Theatrical release poster
- Directed by: Andrew Stanton
- Screenplay by: Andrew Stanton; Victoria Strouse
- Story by: Andrew Stanton
- Produced by: Lindsey Collins
- Starring: Ellen DeGeneres; Albert Brooks; Ed O'Neill; Kaitlin Olson; Hayden Rolence; Ty Burrell; Diane Keaton; Eugene Levy
- Cinematography: Jeremy Lasky (camera); Ian Megibben (lighting)
- Edited by: Axel Geddes
- Music by: Thomas Newman
- Production company: Pixar Animation Studios
- Distributed by: Walt Disney Studios; Motion Pictures (Note: Distributed under the Walt Disney Pictures banner.)
- Release dates: June 8, 2016 (El Capitan Theatre); June 17, 2016 (United States)
- Running time: 97 minutes
- Country: United States
- Language: English
- Budget: $200 million
- Box office: $1.029 billion

Finding Dory is a 2016 American animated adventure comedy film directed by Andrew Stanton, and written by Stanton and Victoria Strouse. Produced by Pixar Animation Studios for Walt Disney Pictures, the film is both a sequel and spin-off following the events (Note: Though some sources called Finding Dory a spin-off, others referred to it as a sequel.) of Finding Nemo (2003). Ellen DeGeneres and Albert Brooks reprise their roles from the first film, with Ed O'Neill, Kaitlin Olson, Hayden Rolence (replacing Alexander Gould), Ty Burrell, Diane Keaton and Eugene Levy joining the cast. The film focuses on the amnesiac fish Dory (DeGeneres), who journeys to be reunited with her parents (Keaton and Levy).

Disney planned to make a sequel to Finding Nemo since 2005, tasking its new studio Circle Seven Animation after disagreements with Pixar. Though it never went into production, a script was uploaded to the official Raindance Film Festival website that includes elements of the unmade script. Disney's acquisition of Pixar in early 2006 led to the cancellation of Circle Seven's version of the film. A Pixar-made sequel was announced in April 2013 as the schedule for a November 2015 release. The fictional Marine Life Institute depicted extensively in the film is based on the production team's research trips to the Monterey Bay Aquarium, the Marine Mammal Center and the Vancouver Aquarium. Thomas Newman returned to compose the score.

Finding Dory premiered at the El Capitan Theatre in Los Angeles on June 8, 2016, and was released in theaters in the United States on June 17. It received widespread praise from critics, like its predecessor, for its animation, emotional weight, voice acting and humor. The film earned $1.029 billion worldwide, finishing its theatrical run as the third-highest-grossing film of 2016 and the fourth-highest-grossing animated film at the time. It set numerous box office records, including the biggest opening for an animated film in Canada and the United States and the highest-grossing animated film in Canada and the United States. The film received a win at the 2017 Kids' Choice Awards for Favorite Animated Movie, among various other awards at various shows.

== Plot ==
Dory, a regal blue tang, gets separated from her parents, Jenny and Charlie, as a child. Growing up, Dory gradually forgets them due to her short-term memory loss. She eventually meets and joins the clownfish Marlin, looking for his son, Nemo, who was taken by divers to Sydney, Australia. (Note: As depicted in Finding Nemo (2003))

One year after meeting Marlin and Nemo, Dory lives with them in the Great Barrier Reef as their next-door neighbor. One day, she remembers her parents and that they lived at the "Jewel of Morro Bay, California". Dory embarks on a journey to find them again and Marlin and Nemo accompany her. With the help of Crush, their sea turtle friend, Dory, Marlin, and Nemo ride the California Current to California. While searching through the wreckage of a sunken container ship, in a container, Dory accidentally awakens a giant squid that almost devours Nemo. Worried, she leaves to look for help and is captured by staff members from the Marine Life Institute.

Dory is placed in quarantine and tagged, marking her for transfer to an aquarium in Cleveland. She meets a brusque but well-meaning seven-limbed octopus named Hank, who fears being released back into the ocean, so he agrees to help her find her parents in exchange for her tag. In one exhibit, Dory encounters Bailey, a beluga whale, and his childhood friend Destiny, a nearsighted whale shark, who used to communicate with Dory through the pipes when they were children. Dory finally remembers how she was separated from her parents: Dory was accidentally pulled away by an undertow current into the pipes and out into the ocean.

Meanwhile, Marlin and Nemo attempt to save Dory, and with the help of a pair of California sea lions and a common loon named Becky, they get into the institute and find her. Other blue tangs tell them that Dory's parents escaped years ago to search for her and never came back, leading Dory to believe that they are dead. Hank unintentionally drops Dory into the drain, flushing her out to the ocean. Dory comes across a trail of shells; remembering that her parents would set out similar shell trails to help her find her way back home, she follows it to a tire, where she reunites with her parents. They tell Dory that they stayed close to home and spent years laying down the shell trails for her in the hope that she would eventually find them again.

Marlin, Nemo, and Hank end up in a truck taking various aquatic creatures to Cleveland. Destiny and Bailey escape from their exhibit to help Dory rescue them. On board the truck, Dory persuades Hank to return to the sea with her. Together, they hijack the truck and crash it into the sea, freeing all the fish. Dory, along with her parents and new friends, returns to the reef with Marlin and Nemo, whom she now considers family, and they all settle into a new life together.

In a post-credits scene, the Tank Gang, still trapped inside their plastic bags, now covered with algae (except for Jacques who is a cleaner shrimp), reach California after floating across the Pacific Ocean for one year. Much to their dismay, they are picked up by staff members from the Marine Life Institute.

== Voice cast ==
- Ellen DeGeneres as Dory, a regal blue tang, who suffers from short-term memory loss.
  - Sloane Murray as young Dory. Murray is the seven-year-old daughter of producer Lindsey Collins.
  - Lucia Geddes as teenage Dory.
- Albert Brooks as Marlin, an ocellaris clownfish, Nemo's overprotective father and Dory's best friend.
- Hayden Rolence as Nemo, a young optimistic clownfish who is Marlin's son. He replaces Alexander Gould, who previously voiced the character from Finding Nemo.
- Ed O'Neill as Hank, a grumpy, but well-meaning East Pacific red octopus, who is called a "septopus", having lost a tentacle.
- Kaitlin Olson as Destiny, a nearsighted whale shark who was Dory's childhood friend.
- Ty Burrell as Bailey, a beluga whale, who temporarily lost echolocation due to a concussion.
- Diane Keaton as Jenny, Dory's mother.
- Eugene Levy as Charlie, Dory's father.
- Idris Elba as Fluke, a California sea lion who is Rudder's friend.
- Dominic West as Rudder, a California sea lion who is Fluke's friend.
- Bob Peterson as Mr. Ray, a spotted eagle ray who is Nemo's schoolteacher.
- Andrew Stanton as Crush, a green sea turtle.
- Sigourney Weaver as herself, who voices the recorded messages broadcast over the institute's public address system.
- Bill Hader as Stan, a kelp bass and Inez's husband.
- Kate McKinnon as Inez, Stan's wife.
- Alexander Gould as Passenger Carl, a delivery truck driver who works for the institute. Gould previously voiced Nemo in Finding Nemo.
- Torbin Xan Bullock as Gerald, a California sea lion, who wants to lie on the rock occupied by Fluke and Rudder only to be constantly repelled by them.
- Katherine Ringgold as Kathy, a chickenfish.
- Bennett Dammann as Squirt, Crush's son. He was previously voiced by Nicholas Bird in Finding Nemo.
- John Ratzenberger as Husband Crab (Bill)
- Angus MacLane as Sunfish "Charlie Back-and-Forth"
- Willem Dafoe as Gill, a Moorish idol and the leader of the "Tank Gang".
- Brad Garrett as Bloat, a pufferfish.
- Allison Janney as Peach, a starfish.
- Austin Pendleton as Gurgle, a royal gramma.
- Stephen Root as Bubbles, a yellow tang.
- Vicki Lewis as Deb, a four-striped damselfish.
- Jerome Ranft as Jacques, a cleaner shrimp. He was originally voiced by Joe Ranft, his late brother, in Finding Nemo.

== Production ==
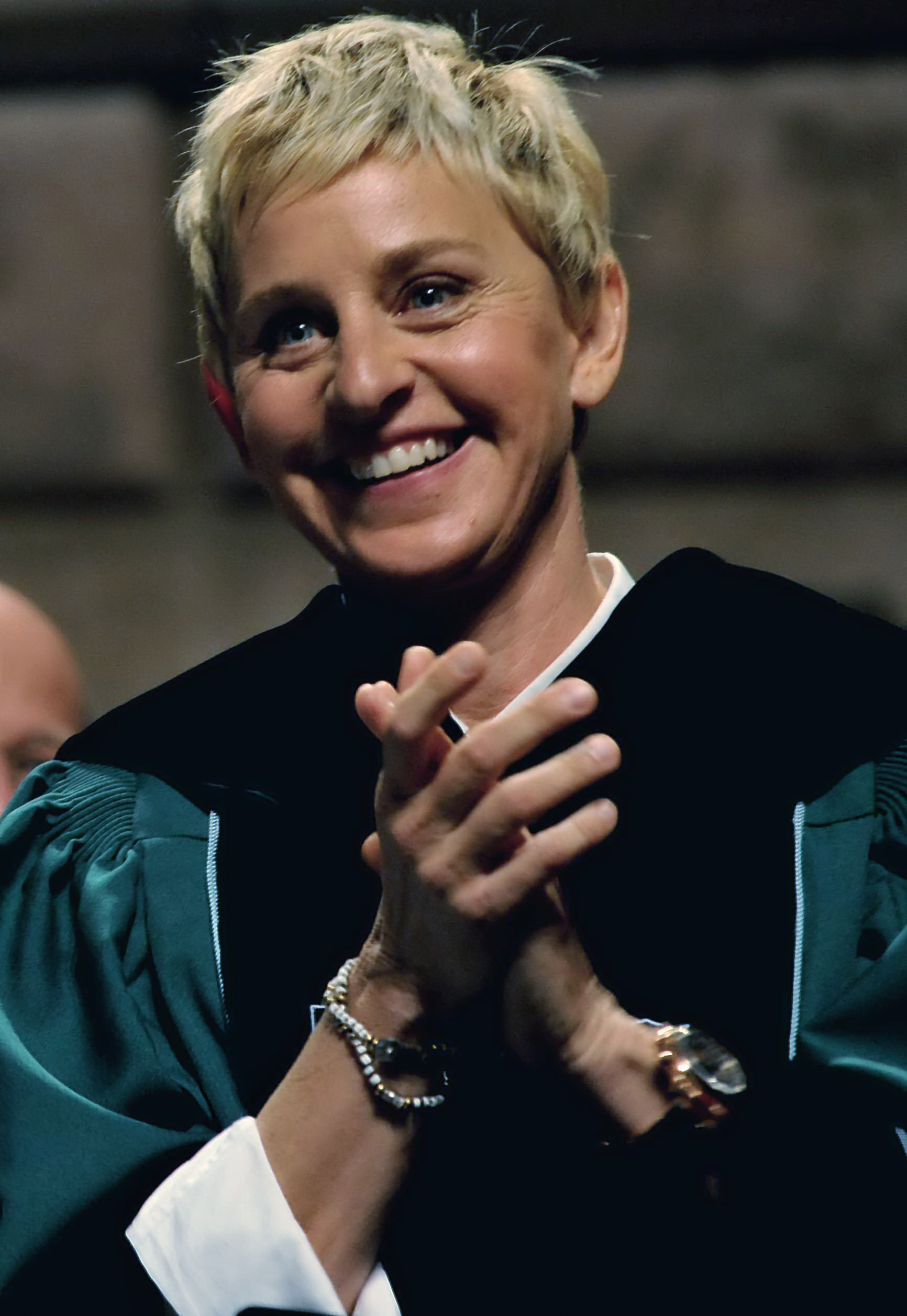
Ellen DeGeneres
(Dory)

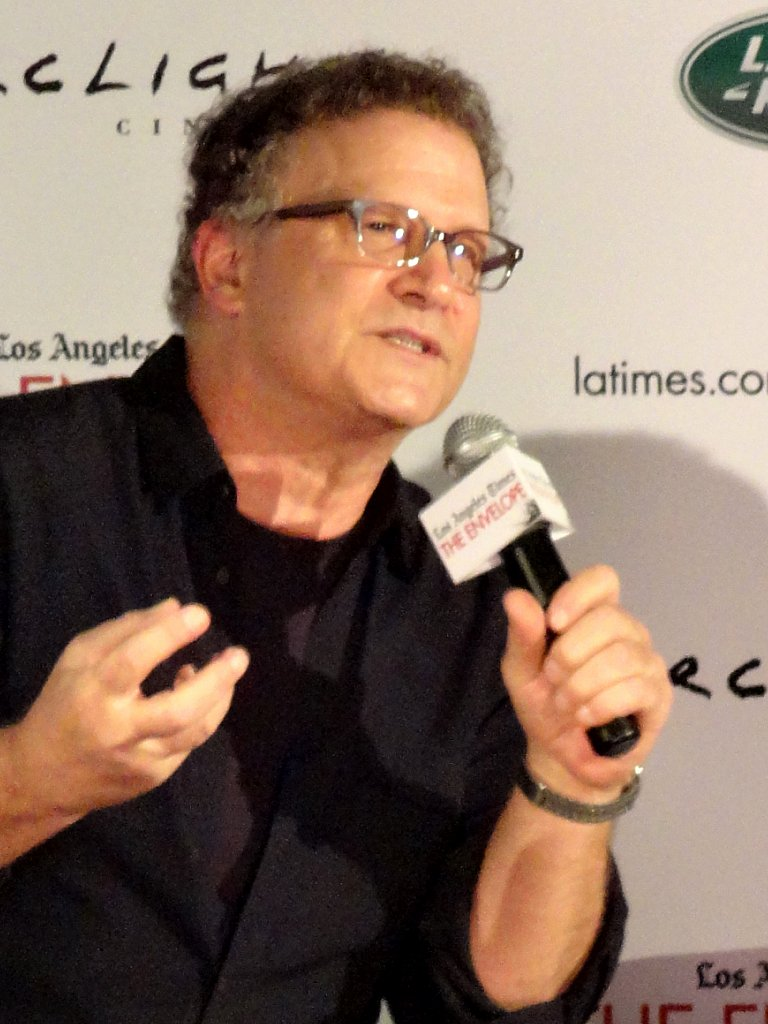
Albert Brooks
(Marlin)

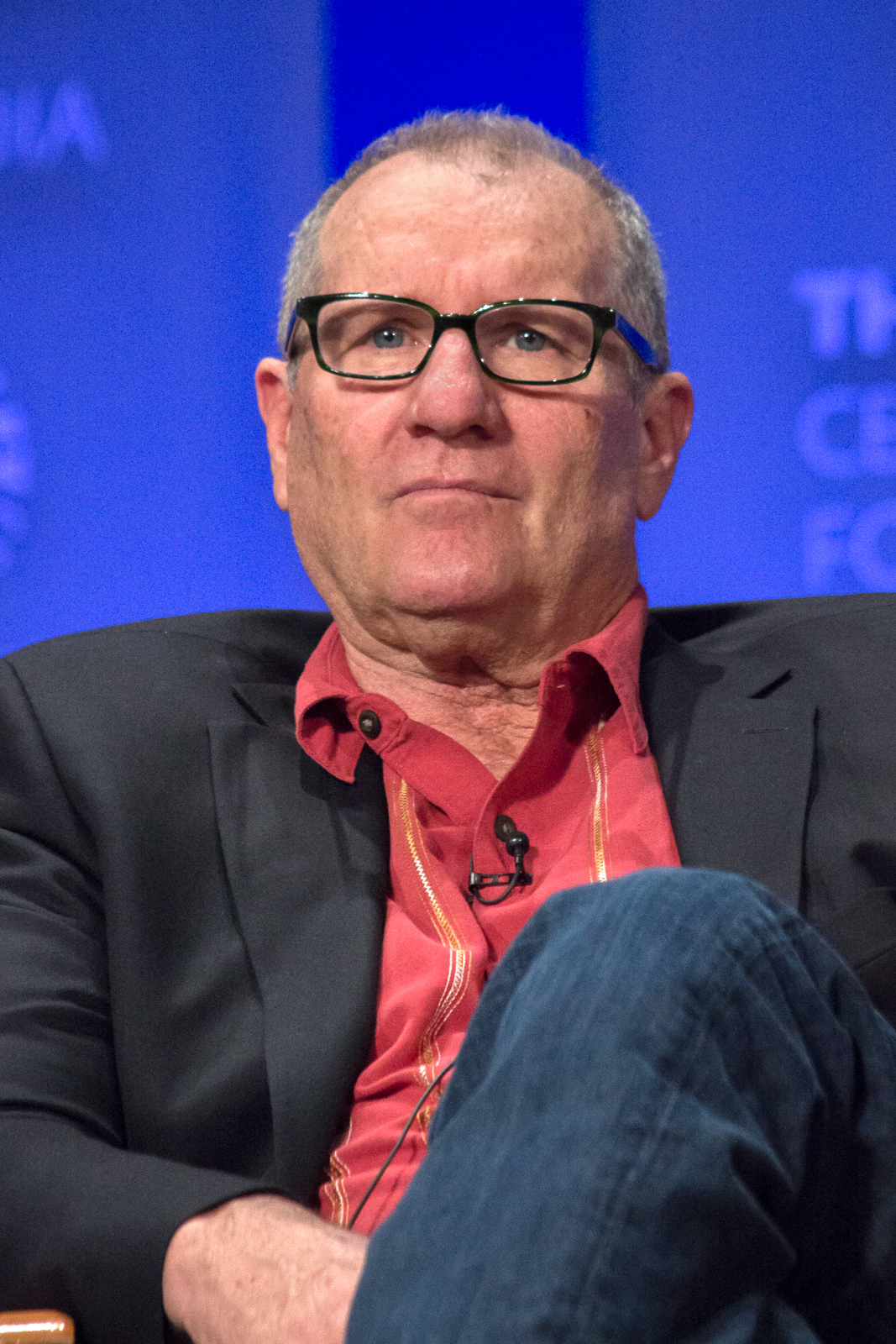
Ed O'Neill
(Hank)

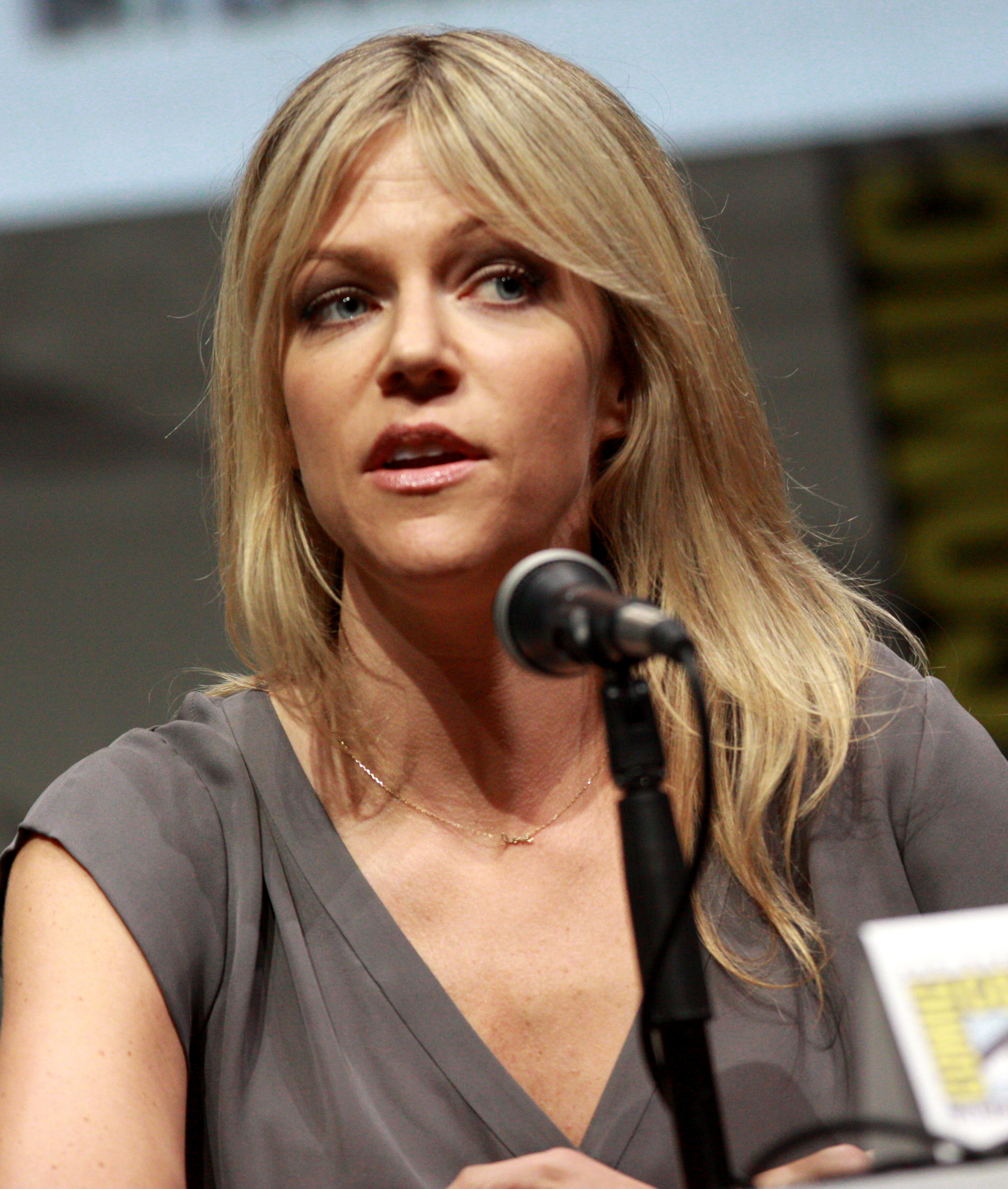
Kaitlin Olson
(Destiny)

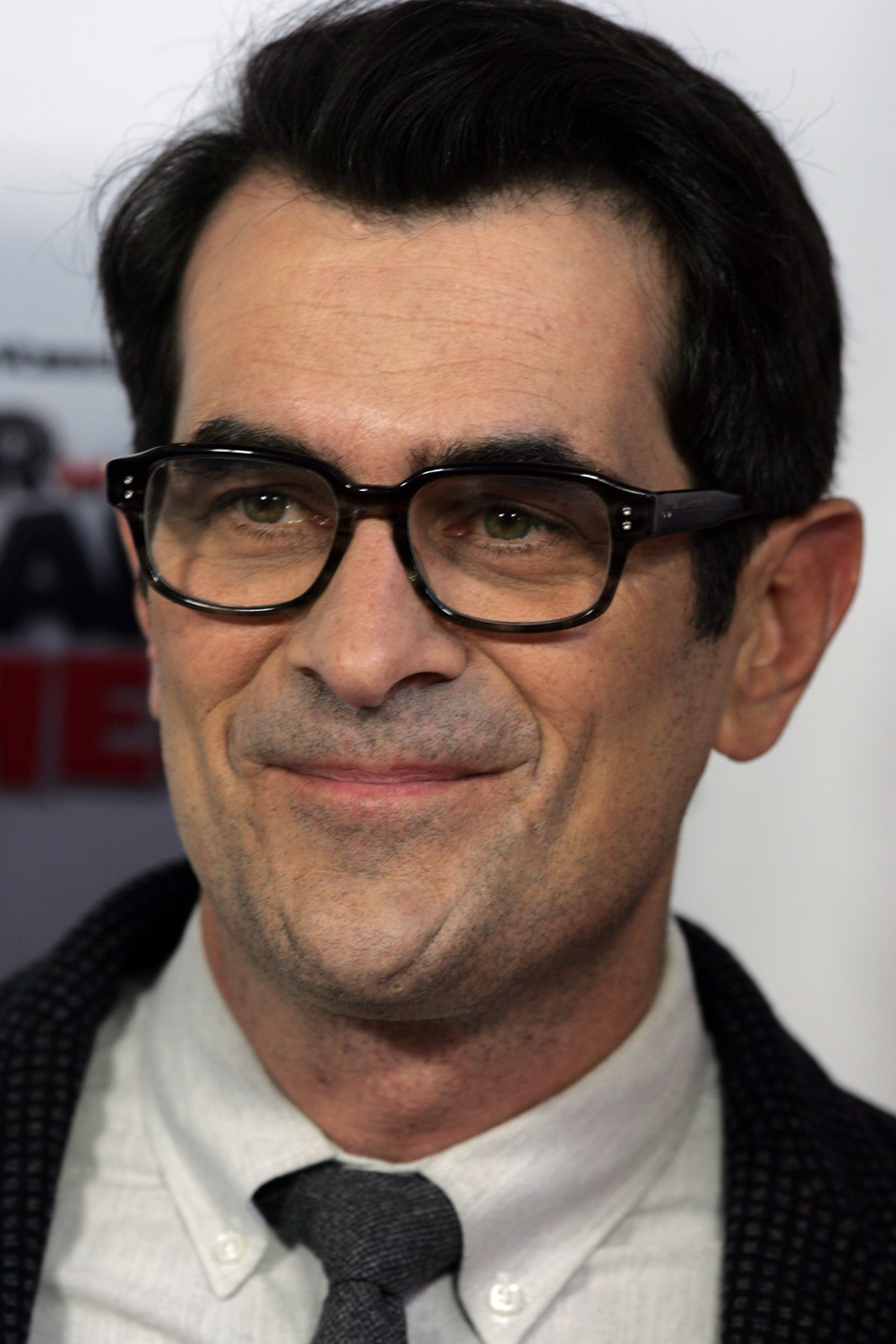
Ty Burrell
(Bailey)

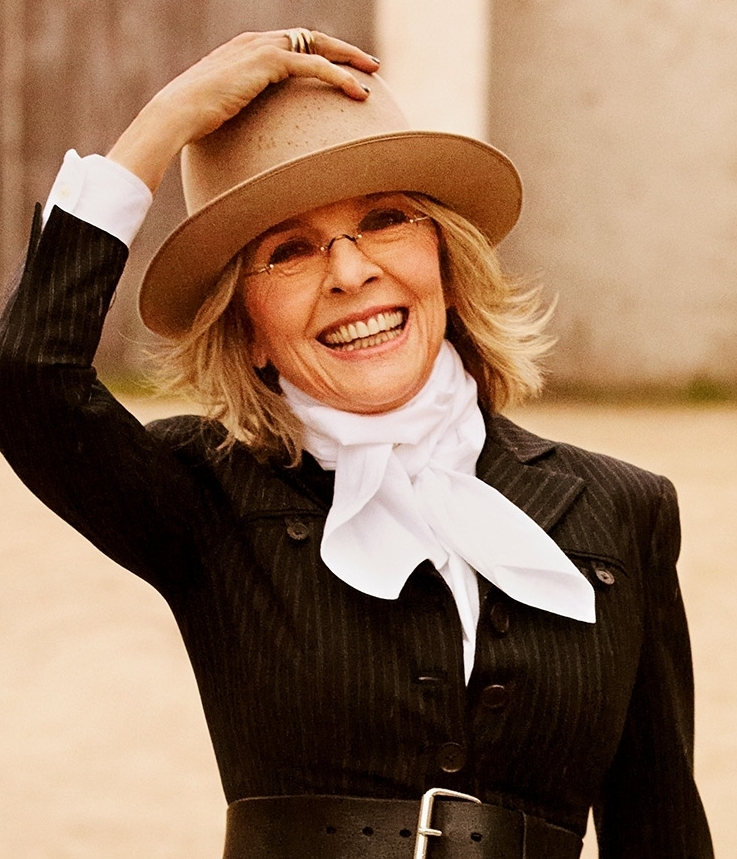
Diane Keaton
(Jenny)

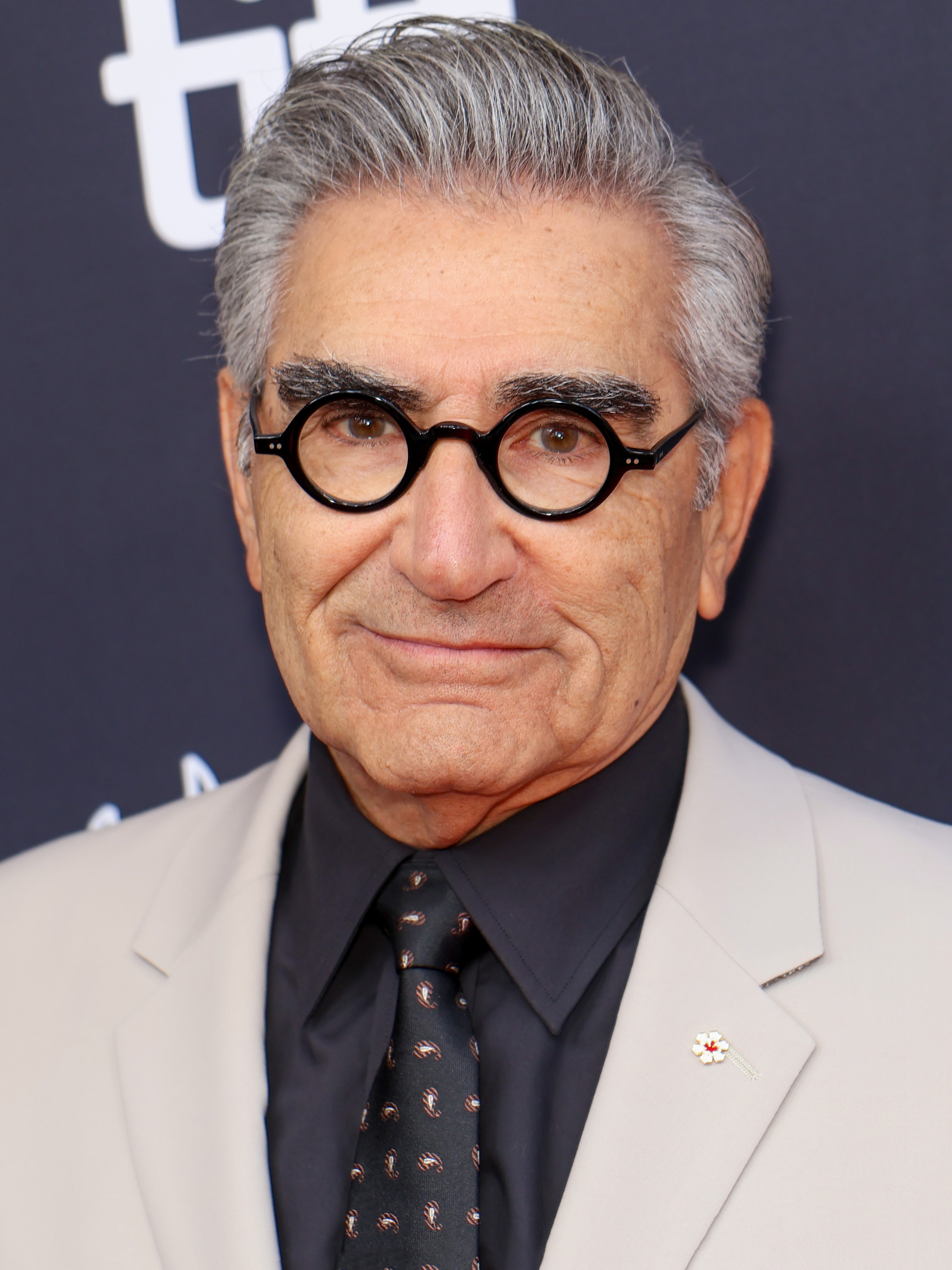
Eugene Levy
(Charlie)

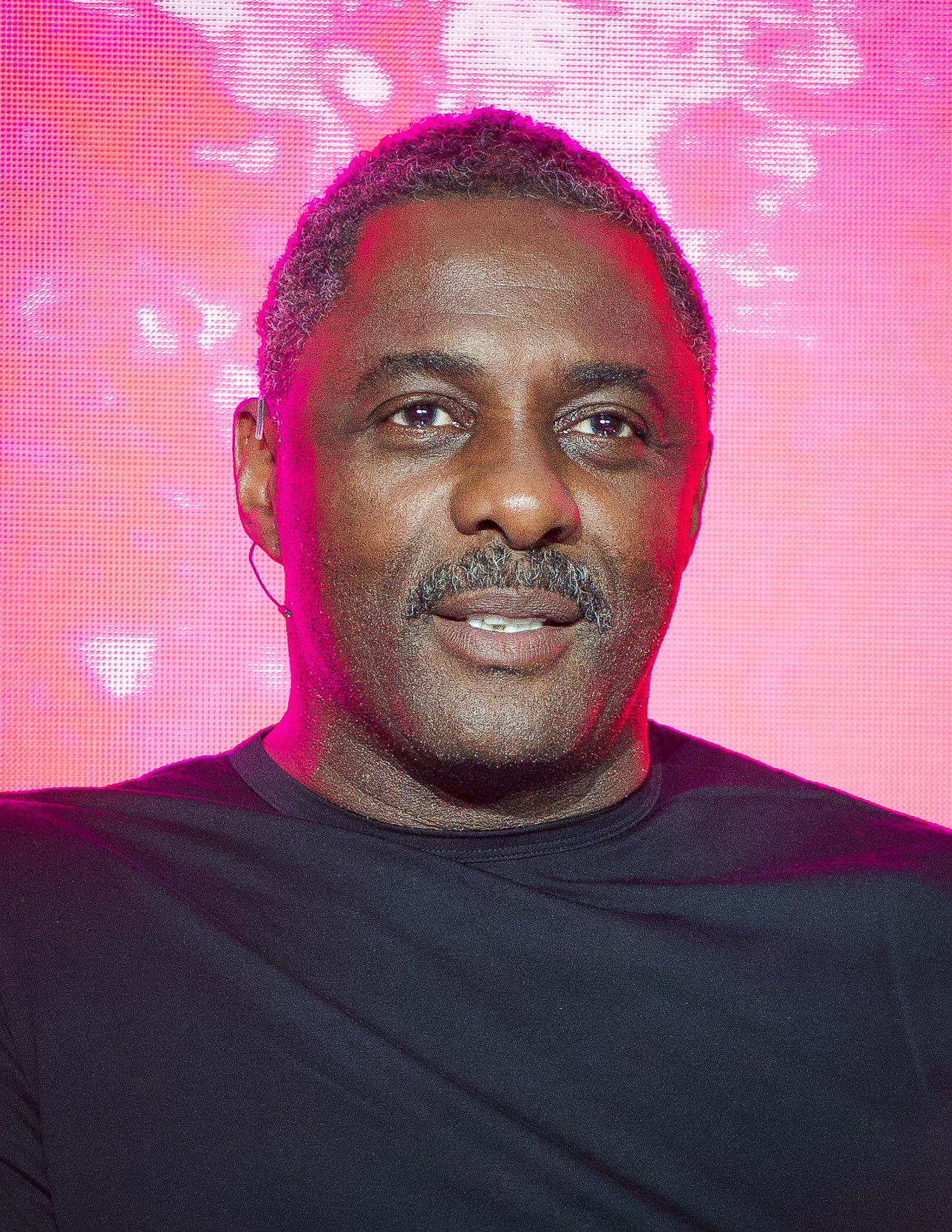
Idris Elba
(Fluke)

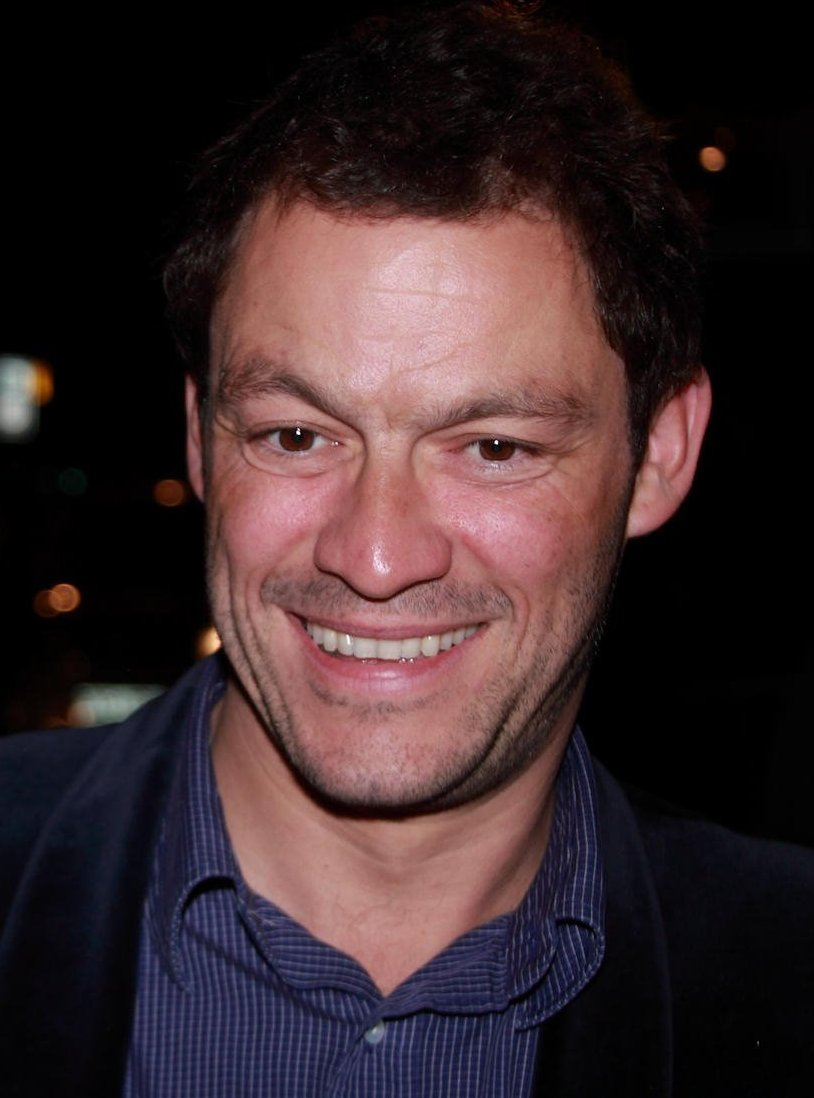
Dominic West
(Rudder)

Prior to work on Finding Dory, the idea of a sequel to Finding Nemo had been teased since Fall 2003. Ellen DeGeneres said in September 2003 that she is game to dive back in for a sequel. "Disney and Pixar have to make that deal right now, but everybody is all for it." She joked that since Mike Myers, Eddie Murphy, and Cameron Diaz would pocket upwards of $5 million apiece for Shrek 2, "Then I'll make $12 million." Andrew Stanton and Lee Unkrich stated in an October 2003 interview to the British press that they were also not ruling out the possibility of making a sequel. "After Toy Story came out everybody said 'Is there going to be another one? We all said 'No way!' But you never know--maybe we will do Finding Nemo 2!".

In 2005, Disney had planned to make a Finding Nemo sequel without Pixar's involvement, through Circle Seven Animation, a studio Disney announced in 2005 with the intention to make sequels to Pixar properties. However, due to the 2006 acquisition of Pixar by Disney, Circle Seven was shut down by Disney without having produced a film. Although it never went into production, a script for the Circle Seven version was uploaded to the official Raindance Film Festival website. Elements of the unmade script included the introduction of Nemo's long-lost twin brother, Remy, and a storyline wherein Marlin is caught and must be saved.

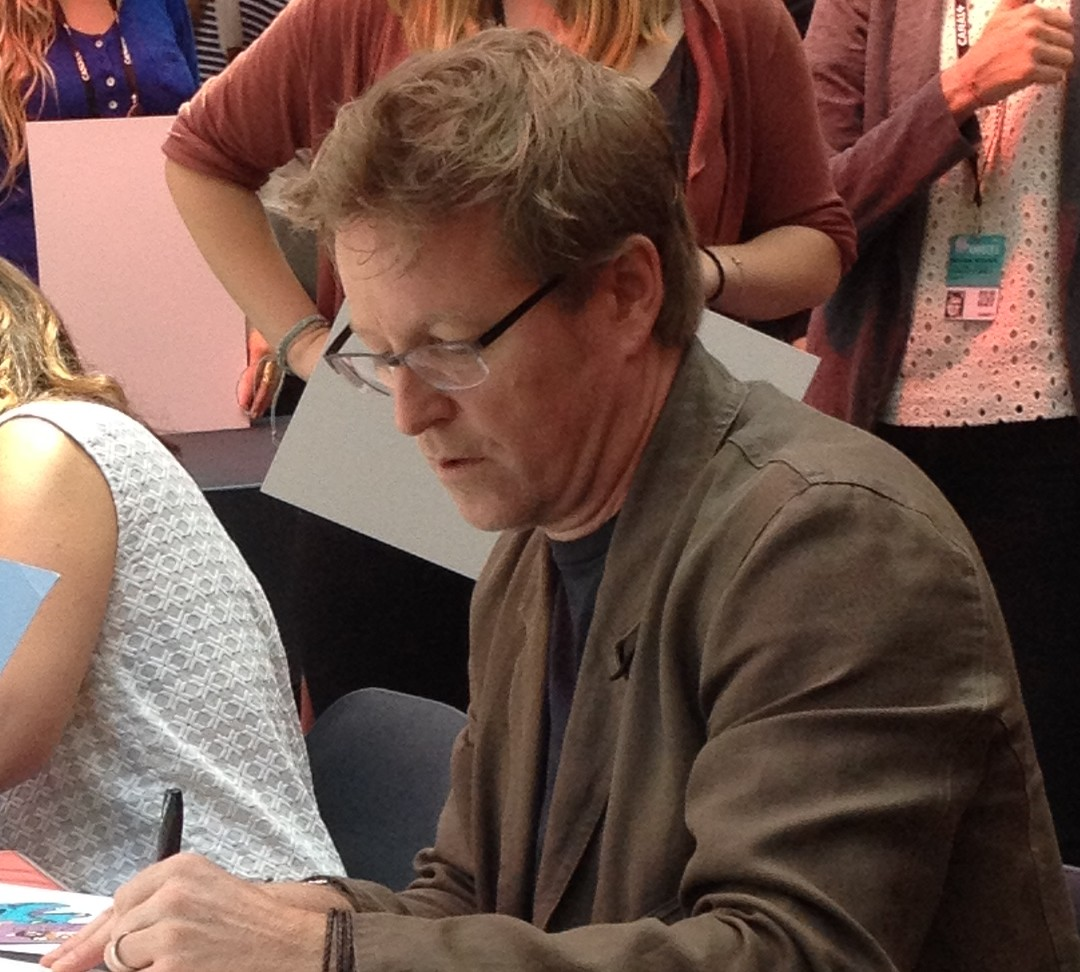
Director Andrew Stanton at the 2016 Annecy International Animated Film Festival

In July 2012, Andrew Stanton was announced as the director of a Finding Nemo sequel, with Victoria Strouse writing the script. That same month, Stanton examined the veracity of the news involving the potential sequel. That August, Ellen DeGeneres had entered negotiations to reprise her role of Dory, and in September, the film was confirmed by Stanton, saying: "What was immediately on the list was writing a second Carter movie. When that went away, everything slid up. I know I'll be accused by more sarcastic people that it's a reaction to Carter not doing well, but only in its timing, but not in its conceit." In February 2013, it was confirmed by the press that Albert Brooks would reprise the role of Marlin in the sequel.

In April 2013, Disney announced the sequel, Finding Dory, confirming that DeGeneres and Brooks would be reprising their roles as Dory and Marlin, respectively. Following a long campaign for a sequel on The Ellen DeGeneres Show, DeGeneres stated:

"I have waited for this day for a long, long, long, long, long, long time. I'm not mad it took this long. I know the people at Pixar were busy creating Toy Story 16. But the time they took was worth it. The script is fantastic. And it has everything I loved about the first one: It's got a lot of heart, it's really funny, and the best part is—it's got a lot more Dory."

In a July 2013 interview with Los Angeles Times, Stanton spoke of the sequel's origin: "There was polite inquiry from Disney [about a Finding Nemo sequel]. I was always 'No sequels, no sequels.' But I had to get on board from a VP standpoint. [Sequels] are part of the necessity of our staying afloat, but we don't want to have to go there for those reasons. We want to go there creatively, so we said [to Disney], 'Can you give us the timeline about when we release them? Because we'd like to release something we actually want to make, and we might not come up with it the year you want it.'"

In a 2016 interview, Stanton stated how the film's story came to be; "I don't watch my films that often after they're done because I have to watch them so many times before they come out. So about 2010 when we were getting Finding Nemo ready for the 10-year re-release in 3D, it was interesting to watch again after all that time. Something kind of got lodged in the back of my brain and started to sort of stew. I started to think about how easily Dory could get lost and not find Marlin and Nemo again. She basically was in the same state that she was when Marlin found her. I didn't know where she was from. I knew that she had spent most of her youth wandering the ocean alone, and I wanted to know that she could find her new family, if she ever got lost again. It's almost like the parental side of me was worried." Stanton additionally stated: "I knew if I ever said Finding Dory or mentioned a sequel to Finding Nemo out loud, I'd be done, [T]here would be no way I'd be able to put that horse back in the barn. So I kept it very quiet until I knew I had a story that I thought would hold, and that was in early 2012. So I pitched it to John Lasseter and he was all into it. Then I got a writer, and once we had a treatment that we kind of liked, I felt comfortable calling Ellen."

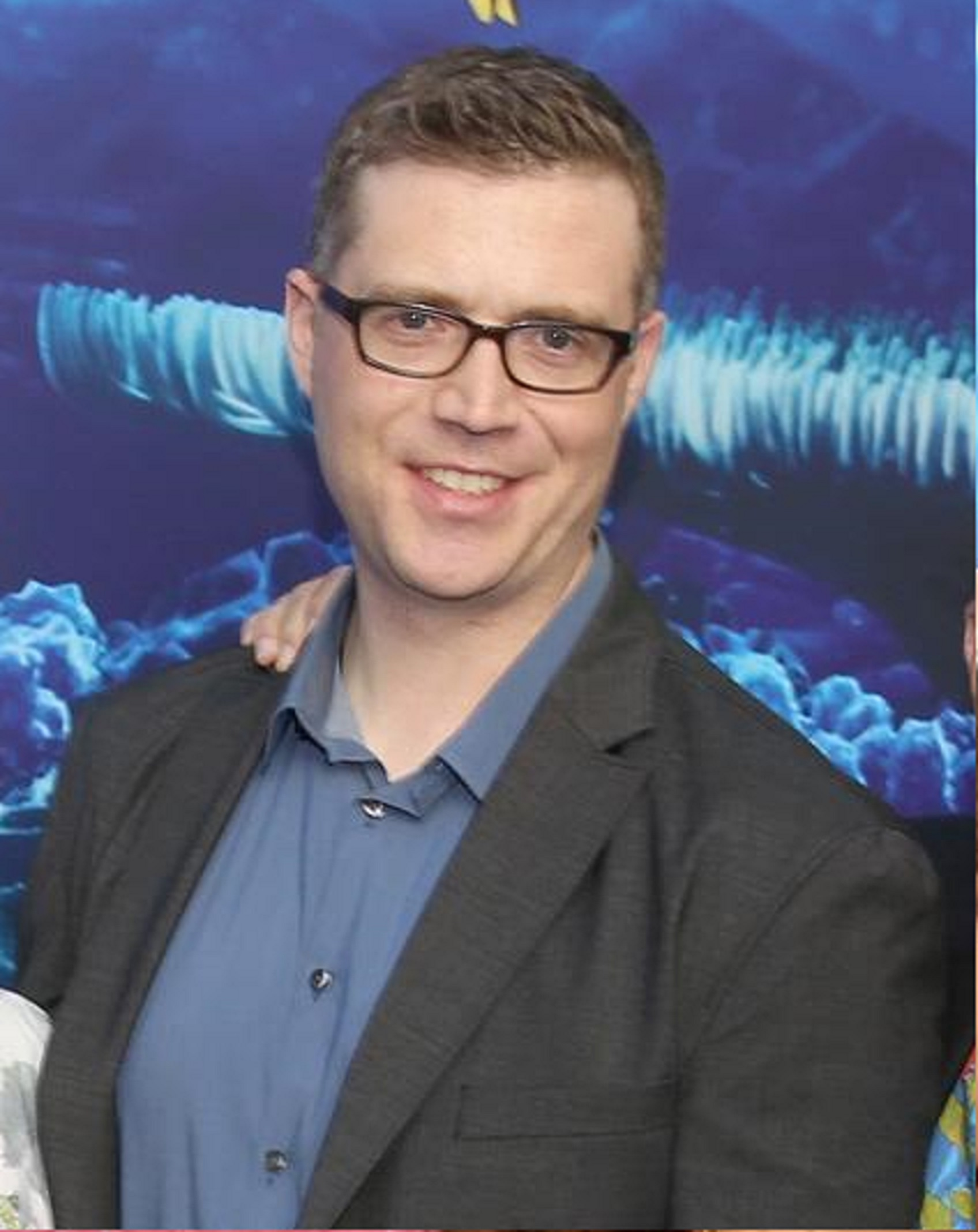
Co-director Angus MacLane at a Finding Dory premiere

Stanton selected Victoria Strouse to write the screenplay. She later said, "It was always collaborative with Andrew, but really the screenwriting was me. Of course, Andrew would do passes, and he and I would brainstorm a lot together and then we would bring it to the group of story artists. People would weigh in and share ideas." She pointed to Dory's forgetfulness as a challenge when writing the script, adding, "You don't realize until you sit down to write a character who can't remember things how integral memory is to absolutely everything we do, and that's what creates a narrative that people can follow. When a main character can't self-reflect and can't tell a story, that character is very difficult to design because she can't really lead. To get her to be able to lead and to get an audience to be able to trust her was the hardest thing to do."

The fictional Marine Life Institute depicted extensively in the film is based on the production team's research trips to the Monterey Bay Aquarium, the Marine Mammal Center and the Vancouver Aquarium.

The film's ending was revised after Pixar executives viewed Blackfish, a 2013 documentary film which focuses on the dangers of keeping orcas in captivity. Initially, some of the characters were to end up in a SeaWorld-like marine park, but the revision gave them an option to leave.

Angus MacLane was one of the first people to whom Stanton revealed his idea for the sequel. Together, with Bob Peterson, they discussed about different ideas for places Dory would visit during her journey — one of those ideas was the touch pool sequence. Later, during the Brave (2012) wrap party, Stanton invited MacLane to join him in his first co-directing duty. Stanton described MacLane's role as a "jack of all trades", particularly utilizing his experience in animation and story, as well as in production, having created a few short films himself.

In August 2015, at Disney's D23 Expo, it was announced that Hayden Rolence would voice Nemo, replacing Alexander Gould from the first film, whose voice had deepened since reaching adulthood (Gould voiced a minor character in the sequel instead). At the D23 expo they also announced that Ed O'Neill would be the voice of Hank.

To make the light appear more realistic, RenderMan was re-engineered, marking one of the larger changes to the software in the past 25 years.

== Music ==
The film's soundtrack was composed and conducted by Thomas Newman and released on June 17, 2016.

== Release ==
=== Theatrical ===
Finding Dory premiered on June 8, 2016, at the El Capitan Theatre in Los Angeles. The film was initially scheduled for release on November 25, 2015, but was later pushed back to June 17, 2016, with The Good Dinosaur taking its slot. In theaters, Finding Dory was accompanied by a short film, Piper (2016). The film was re-released for Labor Day Weekend on September 2.

=== Home media ===
Walt Disney Studios Home Entertainment released Finding Dory for digital release on October 25, 2016, and on Blu-ray (2D and 3D) and DVD on November 15. Physical copies contain behind-the-scenes featurettes, audio commentary, deleted scenes, and two shorts: Piper and Marine Life Interviews; it featured interviews with the inhabitants of the Marine Life Institute about their encounters with Dory. The film made a revenue of $91.5 million from home media sales with 5.5 million units sold, making it the second best-selling title of 2016 behind Star Wars: The Force Awakens. Finding Dory was released on 4K Ultra HD Blu-ray on September 10, 2019.

== Reception ==
=== Box office ===
Finding Dory earned $486.3 million in the United States and Canada and $542.3 million in other countries, for a worldwide total of $1.029 billion. It was the third-highest-grossing film of 2016 and the fourth-highest-grossing animated film of all time. It had a worldwide opening of $185.7 million, which is the sixth-biggest of all time for an animated film, and an IMAX global opening of $6.4 million. On August 16, it earned $900 million in ticket sales, and on October 9, it passed the $1 billion threshold. Deadline Hollywood calculated the film's net profit as $296.6 million, accounting for production budgets, marketing, talent participations, and other costs; box office grosses and home media revenues placed it fourth on their list of 2016's "Most Valuable Blockbusters".

==== North America ====
The film was released with Central Intelligence on June 17, 2016, in 4,305 theaters: 3,200 in 3D, approximately 100 in IMAX, and 425 in premium large format. Finding Dory earned $55 million on its first day, including $9.2 million from Thursday night previews—a record for both Pixar and any animated film. It was Fandango's top pre-selling animated film of all time, outselling the previous record-holder, Minions (2015). The film debuted earning $135.1 million, a record for the highest opening weekend for an animated film, which was 93.8% above Finding Nemo's $70.3 million debut. Finding Dory also had the second-highest June opening weekend, behind Jurassic World. It further broke the record for the biggest PLF and Cinemark XD opening for an animated film with $10.4 million and $2.6 million, respectively. In IMAX, it made $5 million from 211 theaters, the third-best animated IMAX opening behind Zootopia ($5.2 million) and Toy Story 3 ($8.4 million).

Following its record-breaking openings, it scored the biggest Monday for Pixar by grossing $19.6 million (breaking Toy Story 3's $15.6 million) and the best Monday in June for an animated film. However, among all animated films, it is ranked second—behind 2004's Shrek 2, which made $23.4 million on its first Monday, and it is also the biggest Tuesday for an animated film with $23.2 million, besting Minions' $16.8 million. It jumped 18.5% over its Monday gross, a rare achievement for a film. It crossed the $200 million mark in its first seven days, becoming the first (and fastest) animated film to pass this milestone in just a week. It fell only 46% in its second weekend earning $73 million to record the biggest second weekend for an animated film (breaking Shrek 2's $72.2 million previous record), the biggest for Disney and 2016 (surpassing Captain America: Civil War's $72.6 million), and the eighth-biggest second weekend gross of all time overall. This was despite facing stiff competition from newcomer Independence Day: Resurgence. It crossed $300 million in 12 days—a new record for an animated film, surpassing the previous record held by Shrek 2 and Toy Story 3 (both of which took 18 days), and became the second animated film of 2016 (after Zootopia), the fourth Disney film of 2016, and the sixth overall film of the year to cross the milestone. It continued to dominate the box office for the third straight weekend, despite competitions from three new wide releases—The Legend of Tarzan, The Purge: Election Year, and fellow Disney release The BFG—after witnessing a 42% decline to $41.8 million in three days and $51.4 million in four days, respectively, during the Independence Day holiday frame. This made it the second time in two years and just the third time since 1992, the July 4 holiday box office was topped by a film in its third weekend of release. It broke another record as it passed the $400 million mark in 21 days, which is the fastest for an animated film, the fastest of 2016, the fastest for the studio, and the fifth-fastest of all time overall. Moreover, it became the second film of 2016 (after Captain America: Civil War), the fifth animated film, the ninth film for the studio, and the twenty-fourth film overall to pass the milestone. On the following day (July 8), it became the highest-grossing film of the year in the United States and Canada. It dropped out of the top ten in its eighth week.

Although the film was finally overtaken by The Secret Life of Pets (and The Legend of Tarzan in second place) in its fourth weekend, it nevertheless passed The Lion King to become the highest-grossing Disney animated film of all time in the same weekend, surpassing the latter which held the record for 15 non-consecutive years. In just 30 days, it overtook Shrek 2 ($441.2 million) to become the highest-grossing animated film of all time, breaking the latter's record of 12 years. Four days later, on July 20, it became the first-ever animated film in cinematic history to cross the $450 million mark. As with its predecessor Finding Nemo, the studio expanded the theater count for the film during Labor Day Weekend from 345 to 2,075.

==== Outside North America ====
Worldwide, Finding Dory received a staggered release in a span of four months from June to September, with Germany being the last country. This was done in order to take advantage of key holidays and competitive dates around the world. It made an estimated $50.7 million in its opening weekend in 29 countries. In its second weekend, it added $38.7 million from 37 markets, falling in third place behind Independence Day: Resurgence and Now You See Me 2. In the same weekend along with its $73 million take in North America, the film helped Pixar cross the $10 billion mark worldwide since Toy Story (1995). By its fourth weekend, the animated film helped Disney push past the $3 billion mark internationally and $5 billion globally.

It had the biggest opening for an animated film in Brazil ($7.1 million) and the Netherlands ($2.1 million), and the biggest of all time for a Disney animated or Pixar film in Australia ($7.7 million), the Philippines ($2.1 million), Singapore ($1.3 million), India ($1 million), Indonesia, Peru and Central America, and in Russia it opened with $3.2 million, and the second-biggest in the United Kingdom and Ireland ($10.7 million), Mexico ($9.4 million) and Argentina ($3.5 million), and Colombia ($2.1 million), behind Monsters University. In the UK and Ireland, the film recorded the second-biggest animated opening of the year with £8.1 million ($10.7 million) from 580 theaters, behind only The Secret Life of Pets. However, if previews are excluded, Finding Dory is ahead. Moreover, it also posted the second-biggest Disney/Pixar opening, behind only Toy Story 3 (fourth-biggest if previews are included), and the seventh-biggest animated opening of all time overall based on pure Friday-to-Sunday gross alone. It added an additional 43 theaters in its second weekend, after which it added another £3.98 million ($5.1 million) at the weekend, thereby passing the £20 million mark in just 10 days (among Pixar films, only Toy Story 3 reached £20 million faster). It made an impressive £8.15 million during weekdays, from Monday to Thursday resulting in a £2.03 million daily-average gross. According to The Guardian, this was because of the school holidays that prevailed on the weekdays. Otherwise, family films earn the vast majority of their takings on Saturday and Sunday, and showtimes typically reduce on weekdays. It returned to the top of the box office in its fourth weekend and went on to become the highest-grossing film of the summer that year. In Brazil, in addition to recording the biggest Disney/Pixar opening ever, almost twice the previous record held by The Good Dinosaur, it also set a new record for an all-time animated opening, on par with Minions in local currency. In South Korea, it had the biggest opening for a Pixar film with $7.1 million, which is also the second-biggest for a Disney animated film, behind Frozen. In Japan, the film had a two-day weekend opening of $7 million on Saturday and Sunday from 511 screens on 571,000 admissions. For the entire three-day holiday weekend, including Marine Day on Monday July 18, the film earned $11 million on 922,000 admissions. This made it the top western release of the weekend and the biggest foreign opening-weekend in the country of that year. It had further number-one openings in Spain ($4.9 million), France ($4.7 million), Hong Kong ($1.9 million; $2.8 million including previews), Taiwan ($1.9 million), Sweden, Norway, and Denmark. It topped the box office in the Netherlands for three and in Spain and Australia for four consecutive weekends. In Italy, it scored the biggest animated opening of the year with $5.8 million.

In China, where Pixar films have been struggling to find broad audiences and accrue lucrative revenues, the film was projected to make around $30 million in its opening weekend. The film ended up grossing $17.7 million—the biggest Pixar opening in the country's history—debuting in second place behind Warcraft. It surpassed Monsters University in just seven days to become the biggest Pixar film there with $38.1 million. It opened in Germany—its last market—on September 29, where the film delivered a robust opening of $8.4 million, the biggest for any film of 2016 in the country. The film continued to benefit from German Unity Day on October 3. It went on to top the box office there for three straight weekends, tying with Inferno in its third weekend.

It is now the highest-grossing Disney animated or Pixar film in Australia (where it is also the second-highest-grossing animated film of all time behind Shrek 2), Bolivia, Brazil, Central America, Colombia, India, Indonesia, New Zealand, Peru, the Philippines, and Trinidad. It also became the second-highest-grossing Pixar release of all time in South Korea behind Inside Out. Elsewhere, the film's top international markets were Japan ($66 million), followed by the UK ($56.3 million), China ($38.1 million), Australia ($36.3 million), and Brazil ($34.5 million).

=== Critical response ===
On the review aggregator website Rotten Tomatoes, Finding Dory holds an approval rating of 94% based on 340 reviews, with an average rating of 7.7/10. Its critical consensus reads, "Funny, poignant, and thought-provoking, Finding Dory delivers a beautifully animated adventure that adds another entertaining chapter to its predecessor's classic story." Metacritic, which uses a weighted average, assigned Finding Dory a score of 77 out of 100 based on 48 critics, indicating "generally favorable" reviews. Audiences polled by CinemaScore gave the film an average grade of "A" on an A+ to F scale, and PostTrak reported a 91% overall positive score and an 81% "definite recommend" among kids.

Mike Ryan of Uproxx wrote, "I never thought I wanted a sequel to Finding Nemo, but here we are and I'm pretty happy it exists. And, for me, it was a more emotional experience than the first film. Finding Dory got me—it made me cry." A. O. Scott of The New York Times said that while the film lacks "dazzling originality", it still has "warmth, charm and good humor". In his review for Variety, Owen Gleiberman wrote, "It's a film that spills over with laughs (most of them good, a few of them shticky) and tears (all of them earned), supporting characters who are meant to slay us (and mostly do) with their irascible sharp tongues, and dizzyingly extended flights of physical comedy." Joe Morgenstern of The Wall Street Journal said that "Finding Dory can be touching, sweet and tender, but it's compulsively, preposterously and steadfastly funny." Peter Travers of Rolling Stone gave the film three-and-a-half stars out of four and said that the film "brims with humor, heart and animation miracles", despite lacking "the fresh surprise of its predecessor". Wendy Ide of The Observer wrote that the film "reprises the central motif of Finding Nemo: that of the enduring parent-child bond, and the special embrace of family, in all its permutations", but added: "it is approached with such charm and warmth that it hardly matters that the two films share such similar arcs."

Todd McCarthy of The Hollywood Reporter wrote, "Its heroine may suffer from short-term memory loss, but viewers with any memory at all will realize that Finding Dory falls rather short of its wondrous progenitor." Writing for the Los Angeles Times, Kenneth Turan said that, "As the 13-year gap between Nemo and Dory indicates, this was not a concept that cried out to be made." Armond White of National Review wrote: "For anyone who is not a legally bound babysitter, Finding Dory offers nothing that will please a taste for finer humor, freer fun, or genuinely expressive filmmaking."

=== Environmental controversies and issues ===
Conservationists warned that, very much like Finding Nemo, the film could lead to uninformed customers buying regal blue tang fish, Dory's species, for home aquariums. Blue tangs cannot be bred in captivity and have to be caught in the wild. They are related to surgeonfish and exhibit razor-sharp spines on both sides of the tail that can inflict formidable wounds.

In 2019, researchers from the United Kingdom, Canada and the United States published a scientific paper showing that imports of blue tangs to the US did not increase after release of the film, but internet searches for the species did increase.

While promoting the film, actress Ellen DeGeneres reminded audiences that Nemo and Dory's real-life home, the Great Barrier Reef, is under enormous threat, mostly due to coral bleaching, a process induced by climate change, which has killed coral reefs on an enormous scale.

=== Accolades ===
Award	Date of ceremony	Category	Recipient(s)	Result	Ref(s).
2016	Alliance of Women Film Journalists	Best Animated Film	Andrew Stanton and Angus MacLane	Nominated	
2016	Alliance of Women Film Journalists	Best Animated Female	Ellen DeGeneres	Nominated	
2016	British Academy Children's Awards	BAFTA Kids' Vote	Finding Dory	Nominated	
2016	Critics' Choice Awards	Best Animated Feature	Finding Dory	Nominated	
2016	Hollywood Music in Media Awards	Best Original Score – Animated Film	Thomas Newman	Nominated	
2016	San Francisco Film Critics Circle	Best Animated Feature	Finding Dory	Nominated	
2016	St. Louis Gateway Film Critics Association	Best Animated Film	Finding Dory	Nominated	
2016	Teen Choice Awards	Choice Summer Movie	Finding Dory	Won	
2016	Teen Choice Awards	Choice Summer Movie Star: Female	Ellen DeGeneres	Won	
2016	Washington D.C. Area Film Critics Association	Best Animated Feature	Finding Dory	Nominated	
2016	Washington D.C. Area Film Critics Association	Best Voice Performance	Ellen DeGeneres	Nominated	
2016	Women Film Critics Circle	Best Animated Female	Finding Dory	Nominated	
2017	Annie Awards	Best Animated Feature	Finding Dory	Nominated	
2017	Annie Awards	Outstanding Achievement, Character Animation in a Feature Production	Erick Oh	Nominated	
2017	Annie Awards	Outstanding Achievement, Storyboarding in an Animated Feature Production	Trevor Jimenez	Nominated	
2017	Black Reel Awards	Outstanding Voice Performance	Idris Elba	Nominated	
2017	British Academy Film Awards	Best Animated Film	Finding Dory	Nominated	
2017	Cinema Audio Society	Outstanding Achievement in Sound Mixing for a Motion Picture – Animated	Scott Curtis, Doc Kane, Nathan Nance, Michael Semanick and Thomas Vicari	Won	
2017	Empire Awards	Best Animated Film	Finding Dory	Won	
2017	Georgia Film Critics Association	Best Animated Film	Andrew Stanton and Lindsey Collins	Nominated	
2017	Houston Film Critics Society	Best Animated Feature Film	Finding Dory	Nominated	
2017	2017 Kids' Choice Awards	Favorite Animated Movie	Finding Dory	Won	
2017	2017 Kids' Choice Awards	Favorite Voice From an Animated Movie	Ellen DeGeneres	Won	
2017	2017 Kids' Choice Awards	Most Wanted Pet	Ellen DeGeneres	Nominated	
2017	2017 Kids' Choice Awards	#Squad	Ellen DeGeneres, Albert Brooks, Kaitlin Olson, Hayden Rolence, Willem Dafoe, Ed O'Neill, Ty Burrell and Eugene Levy	Won	
2017	NAACP Image Awards	Outstanding Character Voice-Over Performance	Idris Elba	Nominated	
2017	Online Film Critics Society	Best Animated Film	Finding Dory	Nominated	
2017	People's Choice Awards	Favorite Movie	Finding Dory	Won	
2017	People's Choice Awards	Favorite Family Movie	Finding Dory	Won	
2017	People's Choice Awards	Favorite Animated Movie Voice	Ellen DeGeneres	Won	
2017	Producers Guild of America	Best Animated Motion Picture	Lindsey Collins	Nominated	
2017	Satellite Awards	Best Animated or Mixed Media Feature	Finding Dory	Nominated	
2017	Saturn Awards	Best Animated Film	Finding Dory	Won	
2017	Village Voice Film Poll	Best Animated Feature	Finding Dory	7th place	
2017	Visual Effects Society	Outstanding Visual Effects in an Animated Feature	Chris J. Chapman, Lindsey Collins, John Halstead and Angus MacLane	Nominated	
2017	Visual Effects Society	Outstanding Animated Performance in an Animated Feature	Hank – Jonathan Hoffman, Steven Clay Hunter, Mark Piretti and Audrey Wong	Won	
2017	Visual Effects Society	Outstanding Created Environment in an Animated Feature	Open Ocean Exhibit – Stephen Gustafson, Jack Hattori, Jesse Hollander and Michael Rutter	Nominated	
2017	Visual Effects Society	Outstanding Effects Simulations in an Animated Feature	Stephen Gustafson, Allen Hemberger, Joshua Jenny and Matthew Kiyoshi Wong	Nominated	

== Future ==
=== Possible sequel ===
Discussions of a sequel began in June 2016, as Stanton announced his intent to have approaches to worldbuilding across sequels similar to the Toy Story franchise, given the introduction of new characters.

In May 2024, Pixar CCO Pete Docter suggested that the studio was considering making a third installment in the Finding Nemo franchise. He stated "Where else have we not gone in the ocean? The ocean's a big place. I think there's a lot of opportunity there. We're kind of fishing around."

=== Short film ===
In July 2024, while in the middle of her final tour entitled "Ellen's Last Stand...Up", DeGeneres answered in a Q&A session that her Netflix special later that year would be her last act in show business. When asked if she would reprise the role of Dory again, DeGeneres responded "No, I'm going bye-bye, remember." However, in April 2026, Pixar announced that a new short film set in the world of Finding Nemo is in development, revealed to be titled Loving Dory in June 2026,, with DeGeneres returning to reprise her role.

== See also ==
- Finding Nemo (franchise)
