= Counterprogramming (film distribution) =

Film industry marketing strategy

In film distribution, counterprogramming is a studio's marketing strategy to distribute a film that appeals to audience demographics not targeted by another film or a non-film event.

[Counterprogramming is] a strategy that may drift off of increased in-theater foot traffic, target a different demographic than is drawn to a new blockbuster picture, or simply address the too much product, too few weekends challenge

— The Business of Media Distribution: Monetizing Film, TV and Video Content in an Online World

In 2003, a number of successes by specialty films during the summer season traditionally dominated by more commercial films inspired studios to release more specialty films in the summer as counterprogramming, rather than releasing them in the following autumn season. The strategy did not succeed because too many specialty films were scheduled for the summer of 2004 and competed with each other rather than the commercial films.

Studios also engage in counterprogramming in response to major non-film events. Lionsgate distributed the film Warm Bodies in the United States on the weekend of February 1, 2013, the same weekend as Super Bowl XLVII, to cater to the female teen demographic. The film grossed $20 million on its opening weekend and ranked first at the box office.

The counterprogramming approach to the Super Bowl had been employed prior to Warm Bodies; the most successful film opening on Super Bowl weekend was Hannah Montana and Miley Cyrus: Best of Both Worlds Concert in 2008 with $31.1 million. Walt Disney Pictures, which released Hannah Montana and Miley Cyrus: Best of Both Worlds Concert, would a decade later counterprogram against the 2018 Winter Olympics with the release of Black Panther, which became the number one movie of that year.

In 2012, Slate's Jim Pagels reported that the year's film schedule in the United States lacked counterprogramming compared to previous years. Pagels said studios found counterprogramming riskier because films' second-weekend box office performances had steeper drops from their opening-weekend performances than in the past. He said, "Studios can't afford to suffer a slow start and make it up in later weeks." The decrease in counterprogramming was also attributed to commercial films catering to more demographics, particularly the female demographic. The year's The Dark Knight Rises from Warner Bros. had no competition on its opening weekend since no rival studio wanted to compete with the film. Another example was in the summer of 2023 with Barbenheimer, as “counterprogramming” to a summer experiencing an entertainment industry meltdown.

== See also ==
- Barbenheimer
