= List of highest-grossing second weekends for films =

The following is a list of the highest-grossing second weekends for films. Usually by the second weekend in the U.S. and Canada, studios can have an idea of what the final gross may be now that factors such as word-of-mouth and increased competition are starting to show. Many films usually have big drops as they could be "frontloaded" as fans want to watch them on opening weekend to be first to see it, but some could stay relatively modest as word-of-mouth works in the films' favor. The following shows how much the film has dropped compared to its opening weekend. Like the highest-grossing openings, the list is dominated by recent films due to steadily increasing production and marketing budgets, and modern films opening on more screens. Another contributing factor is inflation not being taken into account.

== Biggest second weekends in the U.S. and Canada ==
A list of biggest second weekend for films between the second Friday and second Sunday of release.

Rank	Film	Year	Second Weekend (three day)	Opening Weekend (three day)	Change (%)
1	Star Wars: The Force Awakens	2015	$149,202,860	$247,966,675	-39.8
2	Avengers: Endgame	2019	$147,383,211	$357,115,007	-58.7
3	Spider-Man: Brand New Day	2026	$144,254,386	$360,091,572	-59.9
4	Avengers: Infinity War	2018	$114,774,810	$257,698,183	-55.5
5	Black Panther	2018	$111,658,835	$202,003,951	-44.7
6	Jurassic World	2015	$106,588,440	$208,806,270	-49.0
7	The Avengers	2012	$103,052,274	$207,438,708	-50.3
8	Inside Out 2	2024	$101,210,550	$154,201,673	-34.4
9	Deadpool & Wolverine	2024	$96,809,328	$211,435,291	-54.2
10	Barbie	2023	$93,011,602	$162,022,044	-42.6
11	The Super Mario Bros. Movie	2023	$92,347,190	$146,361,865	-36.9
12	Beauty and the Beast	2017	$90,426,717	$174,750,616	-48.3
13	Top Gun: Maverick	2022	$90,037,011	$126,707,459	-28.9
14	The Odyssey	2026	$90,022,510	$123,502,900	-27.0
15	Frozen 2	2019	$85,977,773	$130,263,358	-34.0
16	Spider-Man: No Way Home	2021	$84,548,505	$260,138,569	-67.5
17	Wicked	2024	$81,173,815	$112,508,890	-27.9
18	Incredibles 2	2018	$80,347,651	$182,687,905	-56.0
19	A Minecraft Movie	2025	$78,503,124	$162,753,003	-50.5
20	Avengers: Age of Ultron	2015	$77,746,929	$191,271,109	-59.4
21	The Lion King	2019	$76,621,553	$191,770,759	-60.0
22	Avatar	2009	$75,617,183	$77,025,481	-1.8
23	The Dark Knight	2008	$75,166,466	$158,411,483	-52.5
24	The Hunger Games: Catching Fire	2013	$74,179,601	$158,074,286	-53.1
25	Finding Dory	2016	$72,959,954	$135,060,273	-46.0
26	Captain America: Civil War	2016	$72,637,142	$179,139,142	-59.5
27	Iron Man 3	2013	$72,525,615	$174,144,585	-58.4
28	Star Wars: The Rise of Skywalker	2019	$72,389,590	$177,383,864	-59.2
29	Shrek 2	2004	$72,170,363	$108,037,878	-33.2
30	Star Wars: The Last Jedi	2017	$71,565,498	$220,009,584	-67.5
31	Spider-Man	2002	$71,417,527	$114,844,116	-37.8
32	Toy Story 5	2026	$70,829,028	$159,677,837	-55.6
33	The Super Mario Galaxy Movie	2026	$68,083,645	$131,703,340	-48.7
34	Captain Marvel	2019	$67,988,130	$153,433,423	-55.7
35	The Batman	2022	$66,511,221	$134,008,624	-50.4
36	Black Panther: Wakanda Forever	2022	$66,482,266	$181,339,761	-63.3
37	Guardians of the Galaxy Vol. 2	2017	$65,263,492	$146,510,104	-55.5
38	American Sniper	2014	$64,628,304	$89,269,066	-27.6
39	Rogue One	2016	$64,033,768	$155,081,681	-58.7
40	Avatar: The Way of Water	2022	$63,338,210	$134,100,226	-52.8
41	Avatar: Fire and Ash	2025	$63,087,667	$89,160,860	-29.2
42	Alice in Wonderland	2010	$62,714,076	$116,101,023	-46.0
43	Pirates of the Caribbean: Dead Man's Chest	2006	$62,345,264	$135,634,554	-54.0
44	The Dark Knight Rises	2012	$62,101,451	$160,887,295	-61.4
45	Guardians of the Galaxy Vol. 3	2023	$62,008,548	$118,414,021	-47.6
46	Lilo & Stitch	2025	$61,808,626	$146,016,175	-57.7
47	Doctor Strange in the Multiverse of Madness	2022	$61,755,804	$187,420,998	-67.0
48	Wicked: For Good	2025	$61,732,755	$147,004,640	-58.0
49	The Jungle Book	2016	$61,538,821	$103,261,464	-40.4
50	Jurassic World: Fallen Kingdom	2018	$60,912,195	$148,024,610	-58.8

== Second weekend record holders in U.S. and Canada ==
These are the films that, when first released, set the second three-day weekend record after going into wide release.

Year	Title	Second weekend
1981	Superman II	$10,765,687
1982	E.T. the Extra-Terrestrial	$12,610,610
1983	Return of the Jedi	$17,229,694
1989	Indiana Jones and the Last Crusade	$21,230,164
1989	Batman	$30,075,189
1993	Jurassic Park	$38,455,860
1999	Star Wars: Episode I – The Phantom Menace	$51,399,863
2000	Dr. Seuss' How the Grinch Stole Christmas	$52,118,445
2001	Harry Potter and the Sorcerer's Stone	$57,487,755
2002	Spider-Man	$71,417,527
2004	Shrek 2	$72,170,363
2008	The Dark Knight	$75,166,466
2009	Avatar	$75,617,183
2012	The Avengers	$103,052,274
2015	Jurassic World	$106,558,440
2015	Star Wars: The Force Awakens	$149,202,860

== See also ==
- Second weekend in box office performance
- List of highest-grossing openings for films
- List of highest-grossing openings for animated films
