= Tyler Austin Harper =

American writer and former academic

Tyler Austin Harper is an American writer and former academic. He is a staff writer at The Atlantic and was previously a professor of environmental studies at Bates College. The Chronicle of Higher Education has described him as an observer of academic politics known for criticism of racial tokenism, ideological conformity, and threats to academic freedom.

== Career ==
Harper earned his bachelor's degree from Haverford College in 2014. He received a Ph.D. in comparative literature from New York University in 2020.

=== The Atlantic magazine ===
In 2025, he joined The Atlantic as a staff writer, after previously contributing to the magazine.

His essay "Why I quit the tenure track" was subsequently the subject of an interview with Harper in The Chronicle of Higher Education. NPR's Morning Edition later interviewed Harper.
