= Second weekend in box office performance =

Factor in predicting box office performance

In the United States, a film's box office gross in its second weekend of theatrical release is one of several factors used to predict overall box office performance. Most films experience a decline in box office gross in their second weekend, but a significant decline often indicates a subpar box office performance for the rest of a film's theatrical run. Some films are exceptions in that they perform better in their second weekend of release than on opening weekend.

== Second-weekend drop ==
During a film's theatrical run, its box office performance generally declines from weekend to weekend. In addition to the film's opening-weekend gross, the percentage of the change between the opening weekend and the second weekend is used as a gauge for a film's commercial success. Assuming that the number of theaters stays the same, a normal drop in box office gross from the first weekend to the second would be 40%. A drop of greater than 60% indicates a weak future performance. Horror films are susceptible to having large drops in the second weekend and beyond even after a strong opening weekend. Chris Anderson, in his 2008 book The Long Tail: Why the Future of Business Is Selling Less of More, said twenty years prior, the average film experienced a second weekend drop of less than 30% and that the contemporary drop was now around 50%. Anderson ascribed the change to moviegoers being able to better identify mediocre and bad films through more information, both from more reviews and greater word-of-mouth. Slate in 2012 also reported a progressively increasing second weekend drop over the course of the last several decades. In the 1980s, the average second weekend drop was 15.7%. The 1990s saw the drop gradually climb to 21.5%, but by 2012 this had escalated all the way up to 49.1%. A lack of venues is usually not a factor as theaters have an obligation to show a film for at least two weeks.

The Los Angeles Times said the second-weekend drop was seasonal in the United States. Between May and July, the country's summer season, films have more significant drops than during the rest of the year. It reported that in May 2014, three opening blockbuster films—The Amazing Spider-Man 2, Godzilla, and X-Men: Days of Future Past—all had drops of over 60% where films earlier in the 21st century rarely had drops that steep. The newspaper cited possible reasons for the drops: that the films did not "inspire long-term moviegoing", and that alternative platforms such as Redbox, Netflix, and video on demand attracted film audiences who missed a film's opening weekend. The Hollywood Reporter said in 2017, "Generally speaking, a superhero film can fall 60 percent," highlighting Wonder Woman's second-weekend drop of 45% as scant compared to others in the genre. Specific weekends during the year are known for poor box office and may lead to large drops, such as the first weekend of December following Thanksgiving when consumers begin shopping, and Super Bowl weekend.

The box office website Box Office Mojo ranks the following films by biggest second weekend drops during their wide release in the United States (with re-releases excluded here), which means screening in at least 600 theaters. The website bases its ranking on box office performance data from 1982 onward.

Top ten films by second weekend drop (excluding re-releases)
Rank	Film	Year in wide release	Opening weekend ($)	Second weekend ($)	Change (%)	Theaters (second weekend)
1	Stray Kids: The DominATE Experience	2026	5,710,133	292,889	−94.9	856
2	Christy	2025	1,310,888	108,487	−91.7	817
3	Over Your Dead Body	2026	1,393,356	159,331	−88.6	650
4	Collide	2017	1,512,824	173,620	−88.5	1,002
5	National Champions	2021	301,028	34,818	-88.4	898
6	Billie Eilish – Hit Me Hard and Soft: The Tour (Live in 3D)	2026	7,011,311	913,517	−87	2,613
7	Undiscovered	2005	8,237,195	966,840	−86.4	754
8	That Time I Got Reincarnated as a Slime the Movie: Tears of the Azure Sea	2026	947,325	130,137	−86.3	837
9	The Chosen: Last Supper Part 2	2025	6,965,185	961,861	−86.2	754
10	Overlord: The Sacred Kingdom	2024	1,112,655	155,175	-86.1	621

The 2012 family film The Oogieloves in the Big Balloon Adventure, though not in wide release during its second weekend, set a record for biggest overall second-weekend drop at the time of its release. It opened in 2,160 theaters and grossed $443,901 over the opening weekend. In its second weekend, it screened in 281 theaters and grossed $43,854, which was a 90.1% drop.

== Second-weekend increases and smallest drops ==
An increase in a film's box office gross in its second weekend, provided that the number of theaters did not grow substantially, is considered exceptional. For example, the 1997 film Titanic had an opening weekend gross of $28.64 million and with only a small increase in the number of theaters, its second-weekend gross (which fell immediately after Christmas) was $35.45 million, a 24% increase from the previous weekend.

Box Office Mojo reported in 2018 that out of over 4,700 wide-release films that were assessed, only 208 (or around 4%) saw an increased gross in their second weekend. Nearly every film to increase its gross in its second weekend benefitted from a holiday boosting attendance, with the vast majority having a second weekend falling on Christmas or New Year's, often the most-attended single week of the year; Memorial Day and Thanksgiving also boost attendance.

The top ten are listed below:

Top ten films with second-weekend increase in 600+ theaters
Rank	Film	Year in wide release	Opening weekend ($)	Second weekend ($)	Change (%)	Theaters (second weekend)
1	Little Women	1994	2,411,247	6,776,403	+181.0	1,574
2	Rumor Has It	2005	3,473,155	9,364,661	+169.6	2,815
3	One Hundred and One Dalmatians (1961)	1985	2,389,226	5,715,836	+139.2	1,180
4	Kiss Me Goodbye	1982	1,345,672	2,845,627	+111.5	803
5	Grumpy Old Men	1993	3,874,911	7,488,527	+93.3	1,244
6	War Horse	2011	7,515,402	14,422,729	+91.9	2,547
7	A Christmas Story	1983	2,072,473	3,935,944	+89.9	938
8	All the Pretty Horses	2000	1,304,971	2,477,053	+89.8	1,593
9	Lady and the Tramp (1955)	1986	2,804,272	5,030,706	+79.4	1,375
10	Out of Africa	1985	3,637,290	6,504,397	+78.8	922

Box Office Mojo reports that 20 films (out of over 1,000 assessed) have opened in over 3,000 theaters and increased in gross in their second weekend.

Films with second weekend increase in 3,000+ theaters
Rank	Film	Year in wide release	Opening weekend ($)	Second weekend ($)	Change (%)	Theaters (second weekend)
1	The Greatest Showman	2017	8,805,843	15,520,732	+76.3	3,316
2	Cheaper by the Dozen 2	2005	9,309,387	14,486,519	+55.6	3,211
3	We Bought a Zoo	2011	9,360,434	13,238,241	+41.4	3,163
4	Sound of Freedom	2023	19,680,879	27,280,179	+39.0	3,265
5	Jumanji: Welcome to the Jungle	2017	36,169,328	50,051,364	+38.4	3,765
6	Puss in Boots: The Last Wish	2022	12,429,515	16,815,340	+35.3	4,121
7	Mother's Day	2016	8,369,184	11,087,076	+32.5	3,141
8	The Wild Thornberrys Movie	2002	6,013,847	7,364,432	+22.5	3,012
9	Sing	2016	35,258,145	42,896,330	+21.7	4,029
10	Night at the Museum	2006	30,433,781	36,766,905	+20.8	3,768

Among films to open in over 3,000 theaters without a holiday to benefit their second weekend, 2011's Puss in Boots posted the best hold, falling only 3%, while the 4.8% drop for 2025's Sinners was the best for both a live-action and adult-skewing film. The following films had the strongest second weekend holds without the benefit of a holiday:

Films with smallest weekend decrease in 3,000+ theaters, non-holiday weekends
Rank	Film	Year in wide release	Opening weekend ($)	Second weekend ($)	Change (%)	Theaters (second weekend)
1	Puss in Boots	2011	34,077,439	33,054,644	−3.0	3,963
2	Sinners	2025	48,007,468	45,708,664	-4.8	3,347
3	Crazy Rich Asians	2018	26,510,140	24,808,202	−6.4	3,526
4	Flushed Away	2006	18,814,323	16,606,526	−11.7	3,707
5	The Santa Clause 3: The Escape Clause	2006	19,504,038	16,927,004	−13.2	3,458
6	The Santa Clause 2	2002	29,008,696	24,734,523	−14.7	3,352
7	Argo	2012	19,458,109	16,445,475	−15.5	3,247
8	Taken	2009	24,717,037	20,547,346	−16.9	3,184
9	Cloudy with a Chance of Meatballs	2009	30,304,648	25,038,803	−17.4	3,119
10	The Shaggy Dog	2006	16,310,058	13,377,363	−18.0	3,501

== See also ==
- List of highest-grossing second weekends for films
- List of highest-grossing openings for films
- List of highest-grossing openings for animated films
