= List of highest-grossing films in Catalan =

This list charts the most successful films at cinemas in Spain and Andorra (sharing a single box office market) by box office sales, in euros and admissions. The list only includes films in which Catalan is the main language and not secondary to Spanish, Gross in dollars account for films released in other markets.

Highest grossing Catalan films
Rank	Name	Global grossing (Domestic in Euros)	Admissions (Spain and Andorra)	Year	Ref
1	Black Bread (Pa negre)	$3,784,105	439,744	2010	
2	Alcarràs	$3,254,862	403,140	2022	
3	Summer 1993 (Estiu 1993)	$3,085,754	198,049	2017	
4	Eva	$1,292,789	142,261	2011	
5	La quinta del porro	€1,235,595	1,237,461	1981	
6	Bruc	€1,187,515	188,653	2010	
7	Jokes & Cigarettes (Saben aquell)	€915,364	145,931	2023	
8	La ciutat cremada	€764,650	1,447,377	1976	
9	La batalla del porro	€684,876	619,949	1981	
10	Uncertain Glory (Incerta glòria)	€637,671	105,032	2017	
11	La plaça del Diamant	€621,052	503,835	1982	
12	L'orgia	€567,549	719,917	1978	
13	Què t'hi jugues, Mari Pili?	€543,053	221,324	1991	
14	Victòria! La gran aventura d'un poble	€521,104	327,866	1983	
15	Amor idiota	€494,314	98,202	2004	
16	Forever Young (Herois)	€470,202	76,549	2010	
17	Fènix 11·23	€445,271	66,629	2012	
18	Barcelona, nit d'hivern	€406,096	62,396	2015	
19	Son of Cain (Fill de Caín)	€397,003	60,054	2013	
20	Boom boom	€392,304	188,659	1990	
	Un parell d'ous	€390,364	235,069	1985	
21	El perquè de tot plegat	€386,240	123,276	1995	
22	Traces of Sandalwood (Rastres de sàndal)	€365,287	62,262	2014	
23	Excuses!	€343,534	70,797	2003	
24	Secon Origin (Segon origen)	€341,667	56,080	2015	
25	El vicari d'Olot	€341,378	303,329	1981	
26	Companys, procés a Catalunya	€335,182	361,840	1979	
27	Three days with the family (Tres dies amb la família)	€316,664	54,198	2009	
	Catalan Cucklod (Salut i força al canut)	304.449	342.441	1979	
28	Beloved/Friend (Amic/Amat)	€297,817	79,667	1998	
29	10 + 2: El gran secret	€246,656	64,989	2001	
30	Distances (Les distàncies)	€234,439	41,550	2018	
31	The wild ones (Els nens salvatges)	€224,744	38,064	2012	
32	El complot dels anells	€214,956	104,840	1988	
33	El coronel Macià	€206,666	41,062	2006	
34	Caresses (Carícies)	€206,098	59,017	1997	
35	Barcelona, nit d'estiu	€202,033	32,293	2013	
36	The Aviators (Cher ami)	€198,216	43,968	2009	
37	Creatura	€212,125	36,839	2023	
38	The days to come (Els dies que vindran)	€195,385	35,803	2019	
39	Havanera 1820	€193,994	82,724	1993	
40	Any de Gràcia	€192,031	33,772	2011	
41	V,O,S,	€189,695	31,297	2009	
42	Ho sap el ministre?	€180,892	73,928	1991	
43	The next skin (La propera pell)	€177,785	37,964	2016	
44	El bosc	€177,353	30,171	2012	
45	We all want what's best for her (Tots volem el millor per a ella)	€174,845	30,669	2013	
46	Catalunya über alles!	€173,040	28,179	2011	
47	Escape Room: La pel·lícula	€172,313	26,767	2022	
48	Cork (Suro)	€147,263	24,604	2022	
49	Actrius	€165,174	47,180	1996	
50	L'adopció	€159,086	29,629	2015	
51	La vida abismal	€157,286	29,033	2006	
52	The odd-job men (Sis dies corrents)	€157,124	27,100	2021	
53	Morir (o no)	€152,130		2000	
54	Peraustrínia 2004	€143,154	80,389	1989	
55	Myway	€137,841	28,094	2007	
56	Joves	€136,404	27,241	2004	
57	Gala	€136,389	26,097	2003	
58	Rateta, rateta	€135,543	62,288	1990	
59	Forasters	€135,180	23,540	2008	
60	Trash	€131,995	21,356	2009	
61	Puta misèria!	€131,605	67,524	1989	
62	Honor of the Knights (Honor de cavalleria)	€130,427	22,503	2006	
63	Barcelona (un mapa)	€129,111	23,571	2007	
64	The Enchanted (Els encantats)	€126,740	21,021	2023	
65	Eloïse's Lover (Eloïse)	€123,326	20,638	2009	
66	Road Spain	€121,495	20,675	2007	
67	La teranyina	€113,964	50,345	1990	
68	The Innocence (La innocència)	€113,506	20,914	2019	
69	Mil cretins	€109,314	18,546	2010	
70	Despertaferro	€108,010	56,784	1990	
71	The Barcelona Vampiress (La vampira de Barcelona)	€104,323	15,866	2020	
72	Un cel de plom	€97,547	16,549	2023	
	De mica en mica s’omple la pica	€87,736	61,525	1984	
73	The Burning Cold (El fred que crema)	€76,760	12,775	2022	
	En Baldiri de la costa (also known as El Baldiria de la costa)	€69,414	520,740	1968	
74	Júlia ist	€63,884	11,819	2017	
75	Life without Sara Amat (La vida sense la Sara Amat)	€55,764	9,809	2019	
	Monturiol, el senyor del mar	€53.826	18.884	1993	
76	Un cos al bosc	€53,680	17,190	1996	
77	Pàtria	€45,879	7,376	2016	
	La ràbia	34.845	43.659	1978	
78	El viatge de la Marta (Staff Only)	€37,693	7,840	2019	
79	Canigó 1883	€22,477	3,498	2024	
80	Unicorns	€17,781	3,172	2023	
81	Les amigues de l'Àgata	€17,064	3,099	2016	
82	L'home dels nassos	€16,077	2,546	2024	
83	Un dia perfecte per volar	€14,981	2,708	2015	
84	El camí més llarg per tornar a casa	€11,386	2,440	2015	
85	The Permanent Picture (La imatge permanent)	€10,927	2,009	2023	
86	Scruff: A Christmas Tale (Rovelló: Un Nadal sense Noel)	€10,098	2,657	2007	
87	El virus de la por	€8,355	2,040	2015	
88	Sonata per a violoncel	€8,012	1,413	2015	
89	Scruff in a Midsummer Night's Dream (Rovelló: el somni d'una nit d'estiu)	€6,688	1,848	2011	
90	Scruff's Halloween (Rovelló a Halloween)	€5,373	1,129	2010	
91	Les Perseides	€3,308	569	2019	
92	Ardara	€1,645	328	2019	
93	Scruff: Cinderella's Carnival (Rovelló: El carnaval de la Ventafocs)	€1,237	332	2010	
94	Scruff and the Legend of St. George (Rovelló i la llegenda de Sant Jordi)	€667	164	2010	
95	Sotabosc	€568	106	2017	
96	Sant Martí	€572	97	2018	

== Most popular film by year ==
Year	Title	Gross	Admissions	Notes
2023	Jokes & Cigarettes (Saben aquell)	€915,364	145,931	
2022	Alcarràs	€2,400,765	403,140	
2021	The odd-job men (Sis dies corrents)	€157,124	27,100	
2020	The Innocence (La innocència)	€113,506	20,914	
2019	The days to come (Els dies que vindran)	€195,385	35,803	
2018	Distances (Les distàncies)	€234,439	41,550	
2017	Summer 1993 (Estiu 1993)	€1,200,511	198,049	
2016	The next skin (La propera pell)	€177,785	37,964	
2015	Barcelona, nit d'hivern	€406,096	62,396	
2014	Traces of Sandalwood (Rastres de sàndal)	€365,287	62,262	
2013	Son of Cain (Fill de Caín)	€397,003	60,054	
2012	Fènix 11·23	€445,271	66,629	
2011	Eva	€904,675	142,261	
2010	Black Bread (Pa negre)	€2,680,155	439,744	
2009	Three days with the family (Tres dies amb la família)	€316,664	54,198	
2008	Forasters	€135,180	23,540	
2007	Myway	€137,841	28,094	
2006	El coronel Macià	€206,666	41,062	
2005				
2004	Amor idiota	€494,314	98,202	
2003	Excuses!	€343,534	70,797	
2002				
2001	10 + 2: El gran secret	€246,656	64,989	
2000	Morir (o no)	€152,130		
1999				
1998	Beloved/Friend (Amic/Amat)	€297,817	79,667	
1997	Caresses (Carícies)	€206,098	59,017	
1996	Actrius	€165,174	47,180	
1995	El perquè de tot plegat	€386,240	123,276	
1994				
1993	Havanera 1820	€193,994	82,724	
1992				
1991	Què t'hi jugues, Mari Pili?	€543,053	221,324	
1990	Boom boom	€392,304	188,659	
1989	Peraustrínia 2004	€143,154	80,389	
1988	El complot dels anells	€214,956	104,840	
1985	Un parell d'ous	€390,364	235,069	
1983	Victòria! La gran aventura d'un poble	€521,104	327,866	
1982	La plaça del Diamant	€621,052	503,835	
1981	La quinta del porro	€1,235,595	1,237,461	
1979	Companys, procés a Catalunya	€335,182	361,840	
1978	L'orgia	€567,549	719,917	
1976	La ciutat cremada	€764,650	1,447,377	
1968	En Baldiri de la costa (also known as El Baldiria de la costa)	€69,414	520,740	

== Total admissions by year ==
Type	2008	2009	2010	2011	2012	2017	2018	2019	2020	2021	2022	2023
Originals in Catalan	143,230	197,300	419,739	314,009	201,555	213,146	46,887	57,974	28,507	23,865	354,254	133,893
Dubbed in Catalan	612,993	367,901	288,350	418,833	626,854	382,355	246,569	315,578	56,407	124,626	255,310	265,855
Subtitled in Catalan	29,806	36,383	44,211	53,050	5,987	133,772	105,723	74,034	14,777	7,131	13,620	11,989
Total	786,029	601,584	752,300	785,892	834,396	729,273	399,179	446,586	99,691	155,263	623,184	411,737

== See also ==
- Lists of highest-grossing films
