= Souvenir (1994 film) =

- Theatrical release poster
- Directed by: Rosa Vergés
- Screenplay by: Jordi Beltran; Rosa Vergés
- Produced by: Rosa Romero; Victoria Borrás
- Starring: Futoshi Kasagawa; Emma Suárez; Anna Lizaran; Pepa López; Eulàlia Ramon; Mercè Pons; Emilio G. Caba; Simon Andreu; Enric Majó; Sei Watanabe
- Cinematography: Flavio Martínez Labiano
- Edited by: Marisa Aguinaga; Quim Boix
- Music by: J.M. Pagán
- Production company: Avanti Films
- Distributed by: Lauren Films
- Release dates: 8 October 1994 (Sitges); 4 November 1994 (Spain)
- Country: Spain
- Language: Spanish

Souvenir is a 1994 Spanish romantic comedy film directed by Rosa Vergés which stars Futoshi Kasagawa and Emma Suárez.

== Plot ==
Set in Barcelona, the film follows the mishaps of amnesiac Japanese tourist Yoshio and flight stewardess Rita upon the former developing a crush for the latter.

== Cast ==
- Futoshi Kasagawa as Yoshio
- Emma Suárez as Rita
- Anna Lizaran as Elvira
- Pepa López as Dori
- Eulàlia Ramon as Mirita Marcos
- Mercè Pons as secretaria del consulado
- Emilio Gutiérrez Caba as Vinyoli
- Simón Andreu as Dr. Llorenç
- Enric Majó as Dr. Espulla
- Sei Watanabe as cónsul

== Production ==
The screenplay was penned by Jordi Beltran and Rosa Vergés. The film is an Avanti Films production.

== Release ==
The film was presented at the Sitges Film Festival on 8 October 1994. Distributed by Lauren Films, it was released theatrically in Spain on 4 November 1994.

== Reception ==
David Rooney of Variety deemed the film to be "a well-choreographed chain of comedic coincidences that's sold short by its halting rhythm".

== See also ==
- List of Spanish films of 1994
