= Ismael Serrano =

Spanish singer-songwriter (born 1974)

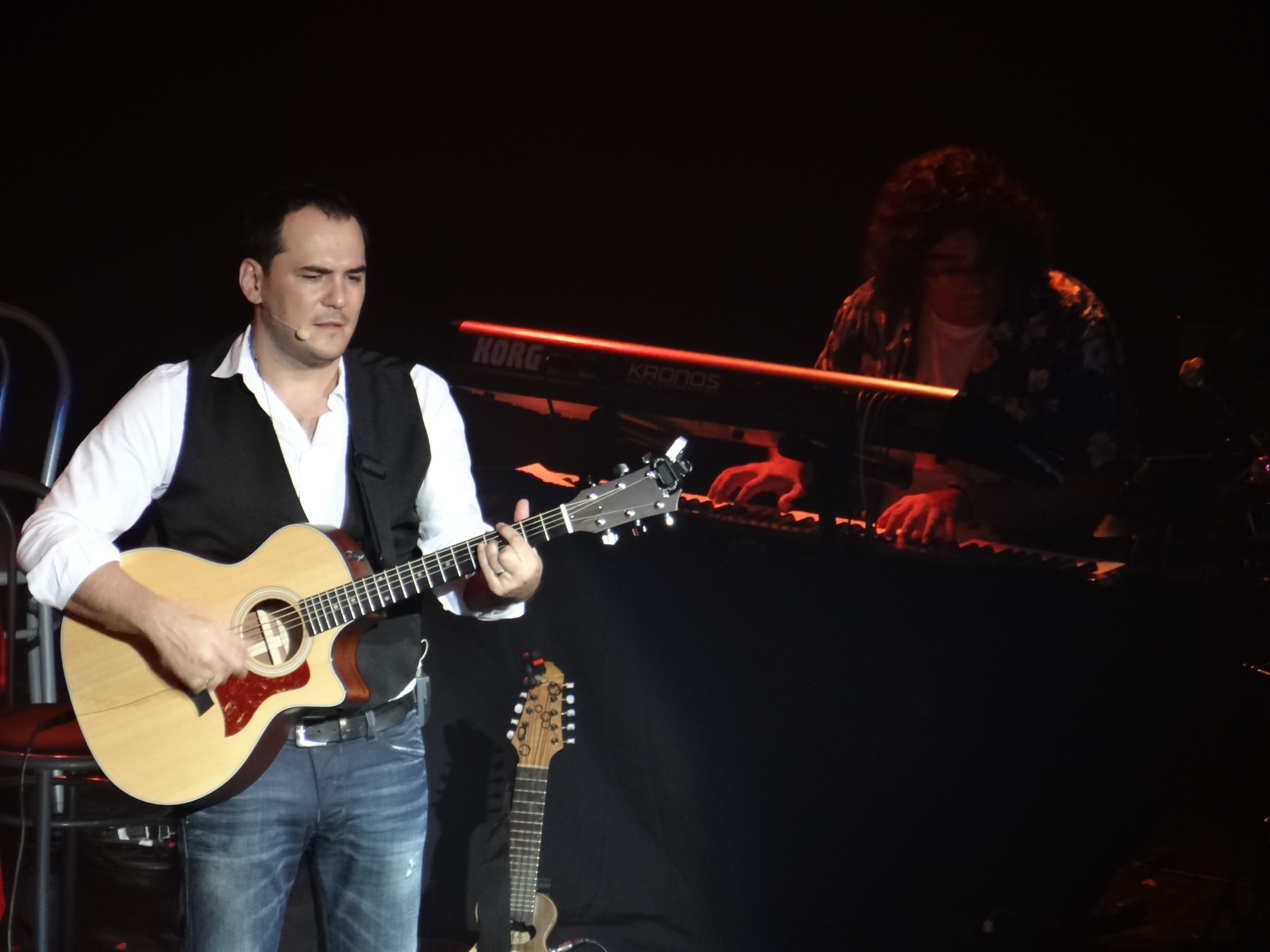

Background information
- Born: Ismael Serrano Morón; 9 March 1974 (age 52)
- Origin: Madrid, Spain
- Occupations: Singer, songwriter
- Instruments: Singing, guitar
- Years active: 1996–present
- Labels: Universal Music, Sony Music
- Website: ismaelserrano.com

Ismael Serrano (born 9 March 1974) is a singer-songwriter and guitarist from Spain, popular in Spain and Latin America, known for his often political lyrics and eclectic musical influences. During his creative career he has been influenced by other Spanish singer-songwriters such as Joaquín Sabina, Joan Manuel Serrat and the Cuban Silvio Rodríguez amongst others. His music also shows influences from renowned poets such as Luis García Montero and Mario Benedetti.

== Biography ==
=== Early life ===
He was born in the neighbourhood of Vallecas of Madrid (Spain) on 9 March 1974. After studying Physics in the Complutense University of Madrid, Ismael Serrano started his musical career in the early nineties in Madrid, singing folk based guitar music in a café circuit, at political venues like Libertad 8, Galileo and Nuevos Juglares. The movement proved to be very popular, inspired by the 20-year-old ‘Protest’ song movement under the dictatorship of Francisco Franco, as well as the Nueva canción movement of Latin America.

=== Atrapados en Azul ===
In 1997 Ismael Serrano signed with Polygram (now Universal) and released his first album, Atrapados en Azul, featuring the songs "Papá cuéntame otra vez", "Vértigo" and "Amo tanto la vida" that became hymns for youngsters in Spain and Latin America. For this work he was nominated for Best New Artist at the Spanish Musical Awards of the Sociedad General de Autores y Editores.

=== Second and third records ===
The follow-up album, La memoria de los peces (1998), increased https://youtube.com/watch?v=EdXWkvKodIo&feature=share popularity (sales level for Platinum in Spain, Gold in Argentina). On his third production Los paraísos desiertos (2000), Serrano moved more to jazz styles and African sounds. Two important music nominations for this work: Best Original Song for the Goya Movie Awards (the "Spanish Oscars") for the song "Km.0" (of the feature with the same title) and Best Sound Engineering at the 2001 Latin Grammy Awards.

=== Recordings 2002–2007 ===
New productions appeared in the following years: La traición de Wendy (2002), Principio de Incertidumbre (2003, double live concert disc), Naves ardiendo más allá de Orión (2005) (phrase extracted from the final dialogue of the cult film Blade Runner), and Sueños de un hombre despierto (2007) pointing out Ismael Serrano as one of the main exponents of singer-songwriter trend in the Latin music world.

=== Feature film ===
In May 2002 Ismael Serrano participated in his second feature film El corazón de Jesus, a German-Chilean-Bolivian production written and directed by Marcos Loayza. Previously, in the year 2000, he sang the eponymous theme song at the close of the film Km. 0, a romantic comedy of errors involving several sets of people who meet at, or otherwise have in common, Kilómetro Cero in Madrid.

=== Retrospective (2006) ===
In late 2006, 10th anniversary from the release of his first CD, a retrospective of his work was released as a double CD under the name "El Viaje De Rosetta" (in reference to the Rosetta spacecraft). This deluxe box set contains a disc with all his singles, another disc with rarities, live tracks and collaborations, and a 48-page booklet, and is also available in a single CD and DVD edition.

== Discography ==
Atrapados en azul (1997)

1. Papá cuéntame otra vez
2. Vértigo
3. Donde estarás
4. Caperucita
5. Yo quiero ser muy promiscuo
6. Amo tanto la vida
7. La extraña pareja
8. El camino de regreso
9. México insurgente
10. Un muerto encierras
11. Atrapados en azul
12. Ana

La memoria de los peces (1998)

1. Últimamente
2. Al bando vencido
3. Recuerdo
4. Ya quisiera yo
5. Regresa
6. Vine del norte
7. Sin ti a mi lado
8. Tierna y dulce historia de amor
9. Instrucciones para salvar el odio eternamente
10. A las madres de mayo
11. Canción de amor propio
12. Mi vida no hay derecho
13. Pequeña criatura
14. Qué va a ser de mí

Los paraísos desiertos (2000)

1. Km.0
2. La mujer más vieja del mundo
3. No estarás sola
4. La cita
5. Tantas cosas
6. Una historia de Alvite
7. La huida
8. Has de saber
9. La casa encantada
10. La ciudad parece un mundo
11. Lo que hay que aguantar
12. Ya ves

La traición de Wendy (2002)

1. Eres
2. Un hombre espera en el desierto
3. Si peter pan viniera
4. Cien días
5. Ahora
6. Pájaros en la cabeza
7. Buenos Aires 2001
8. Prende la luz
9. Qué andarás haciendo
10. Fue terrible aquel año
11. La ciudad de los muertos
12. Será
13. Cobertura: 95% del territorio nacional

Principio de incertidumbre (2003)

CD1

1. Últimamente
2. Principio de incertidumbre
3. Cien días
4. Vine del norte
5. Ya llegó la primavera
6. Km.0 (con Javier Bergia)
7. Eres
8. La extraña pareja (con Lichis)
9. Aquella tarde
10. Pájaros en la cabeza (con Pedro Guerra)
11. Amo tanto la vida
12. Plaza Garibaldi

CD2

1. Qué andarás haciendo
2. Recuerdo
3. Ya ves (con Luis Eduardo Aute)
4. Papá cuéntame otra vez
5. Ahora
6. Zona Cero
7. Déjate convencer
8. Vértigo
9. Tierna y dulce historia de amor
10. Un muerto encierras
11. Prende la luz
12. No estarás sola
13. A las madres de mayo

Naves ardiendo más allá de Orión (2005)

1. Elegía
2. El virus del miedo
3. Sucede que a veces
4. Duermes
5. Reina del super
6. Volveré temprano
7. Alicia
8. Fragilidad
9. Allí
10. El vals de los jubilados
11. Jóvenes y hermosos
12. Estamos a salvo
13. Dulce memoria
14. Ya nada es lo que era

El Viaje De Rosetta (2006)

CD1 (Singles)

1. Papá cuéntame otra vez
2. Dónde estarás
3. Amo tanto la vida
4. Atrapados en azul
5. Mexico insurgente
6. Caperucita
7. Últimamente
8. Vine del Norte
9. Tierna y dulce historia de amor
10. Pequeña criatura
11. Km 0
12. La mujer más vieja del mundo
13. No estarás sola
14. La huida
15. Eres
16. Qué andarás haciendo
17. Cien días
18. Elegía
19. Sucede a veces

CD2 (Rarities)

1. Vértigo (Encuentros con la Habana)
2. Mira que eres canalla (Tribute to Luis Eduardo Aute)
3. Con los cinco pinares (Claudio Rodríguez – Poesía necesaria)
4. Dos kilómetros de paciencia (25 años – Javier Bergia)
5. El último cantautor (Ni jaulas, ni peceras – La Cabra Mecánica)
6. Nueces (Esta mañana y otros cuentos – Coti)
7. El aparecido (Tribute to Víctor Jara)
8. Caballo de cartón (Un barco de sueños – Cantautores cantan a niños)
9. Chove en Santiago (Lo mejor de Luar na Lubre)
10. Vine del norte (Live at Lo + plus)
11. Ya se van los pastores (Son de niños)
12. La Locura (OST "El corazón de Jesús")
13. La Cordura (OST "El corazón de Jesús")
14. Vuelvo a Madrid (Until now an iTunes only song)
15. Principio de incertidumbre (15 September 2003)
16. La extraña pareja (Live with "La Cabra Mecánica" 2 February 2004)
17. Plaza Garibaldi (27 April 2004)

Sueños de un hombre despierto (2007)

1. Casandra
2. Canción para un viejo amigo
3. Canción de amor y oficina
4. Nana para un niño indígena
5. Somos
6. Zamba del emigrante (feat. Mercedes Sosa)
7. Habitantes de Alfa-Centauro encuentran la sonda Voyager
8. Testamento vital
9. Sesión continua
10. Si se callase el ruido
11. Te conocí
12. Amores imposibles
13. Para médicos y amantes

Unedited songs

1. Cita a las siete en La Moncloa
2. Con una pena de muerte
3. Cuatro estaciones
4. La ciudad parece un mundo (primera versión)
5. La cordura
6. La locura
7. La tormenta
8. Los torpes
9. Mañana quizás sea tarde
10. Por qué no te quedas en casa
11. Por ti
12. Vente conmigo
13. Y yo buscándote

Un Lugar Soñando (2009)

1. Somos
2. Cancion Para Un Viejo Amigo
3. Sucede Que A Veces
4. Cancion De Amor Y Oficina
5. Caperucita
6. Penelope Espera En Peumayen
7. Sesion Continua
8. Vine Del Norte
9. A Las Madres De Mayo
10. Zamba Del Emigrante Con Mercedes Sosa
11. Si Se Callase El Ruido
12. Tantas Cosas
13. Ya Ves
14. Recuerdo
15. Canción De Amor Propio
16. Observando Las Estrellas
17. Habitantes De Alfa Centauro Encuentran La Sonda Voyager
18. Ultimamente
19. Vertigo
20. Casandra
21. La Extraña Pareja
22. Como La Cigarra
23. Papa Cuentame Otra Vez
24. Eres
25. Ya Nada Es Lo Que Era

La Llamada (2014)

1. Apenas Se Nada de la Vida
2. Candombe para Olvidar
3. Pequeña Bachata Mediterránea
4. El Día de la Ira
5. Rebelión en Hamelin
6. Éramos tan Jóvenes
7. Quisiera
8. Mi Problema
9. La Casa y el Lobo
10. Absoluto
11. Te Vi
12. Ahora Que Te Encuentro
13. La Llamada

20 años. Hoy es siempre (2017)

CD1

1. Ven
2. Las cuatro y diez
3. Últimamente
4. Sucede que a veces
5. Spaghetti del rock
6. Pequeña criatura
7. Cien
8. Te vas
9. No estarás sola
10. Ojalá
11. Luces errantes
12. Busco una canción
13. Todo cambia
14. Si se callase el ruido – feat. Rozalén

CD2

1. Papá, cuéntame otra vez
2. Recuerdo
3. La llamada
4. Ya ves
5. Nieve
6. Y sin embargo
7. Vine del norte
8. Vértigo
9. Ahora que te encuentro
10. Agua y aceite
11. Aguas abril
12. Todo empieza y todo acaba en ti

Todavía (2018)

1. Semana
2. Al bando vencido
3. Sin ti a mi lado
4. Podría ser
5. Duermes
6. Palabras para Julia
7. Te odio
8. Tantas cosas
9. Crucé un océano
10. Mi problema
11. Amo tanto la vida
12. Ahora
13. Testamento vital
