= Teresa Cunillé =

Spanish actress (born 1924)

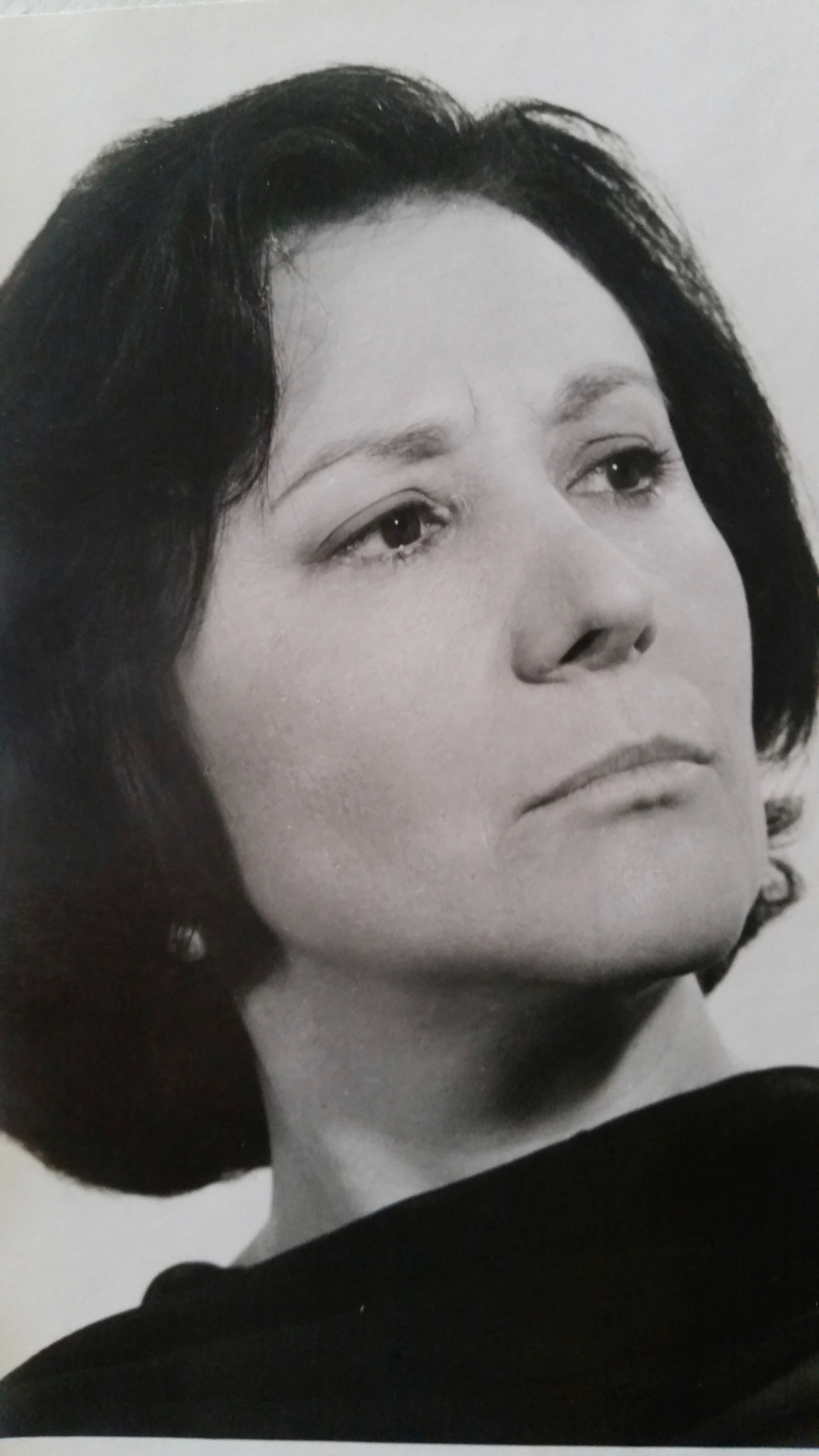
- Cunillé in 1960
- Born: Teresa Cunillé i Rovira; 22 October 1924 (age 101); Sabadell, Spain
- Occupation: Actress
- Years active: 1951–present
- Spouse: Domènec Vilarrasa

Teresa Cunillé i Rovira (born 22 October 1924) is a Spanish actress with a long career in stage and film.

Over the course of 56 years, she has worked in more than 100 plays and has received numerous awards, including the Sant Jordi Cross, the Medal for Stage Merit of the City of Sabadell, the Serra d'Or Award and the Margaret Xirgu. In 2013, she was chosen as the emblematic actress of the events celebrating the 150th anniversary of the creation of the Romea Theater for being one of the actresses who have premiered the most works in this theater.

== Early life ==
Teresa Cunillé i Rovira was born into a family of weavers from Sabadell where her father and mother were great theater and zarzuela lovers. Her father, Jaume Cunillé, had been a professional tenor but had to stop because of a cardiovascular disease.

Working as a weaver, between the 1920s and until his death in 1951, Jaume Cunillé promoted several amateur theater companies in Sabadell. Teresa grew up in this environment and soon began to act alongside her father in zarzuelas such as Los claveles, La Dolorosa, La del manojo de Rosas or El rey que rabió, where father and daughter achieved great success as a couple comic, she, however, was more and more attracted to the Catalan plays that they also performed from Sunday to Sunday.

== Career ==
Throughout her career he also worked in film, television and dubbing, highlighting films such as La respuesta (I bury myself in the foundations) by Josep M ª Forn (1968), Si te dicen que caí by Vicente Aranda (1989), La punyalada by Jordi Grau (1989) and Havanera 1820 by Antoni Verdaguer (1992); the miniseries Maresme shot by Rosa Vergés (2002), and the TV3 series Nissaga de Poder (1996).

== Later life ==
Cunillé married Domènec Vilarrasa, and went to study at the Barcelona Theater Institute where she graduated in 1947 with the Enric Jimènez Extraordinary Prize.

The Teresa Cunillé Award was created in 2018 by the joint initiative of the actress and the Romea Theater Owners who hold it biannually. Its purpose is to encourage and support research on the history of Catalan theatre.

She turned 100 on 22 October 2024.
