= Montserrat Salvador =

Spanish actress (1927–2025)

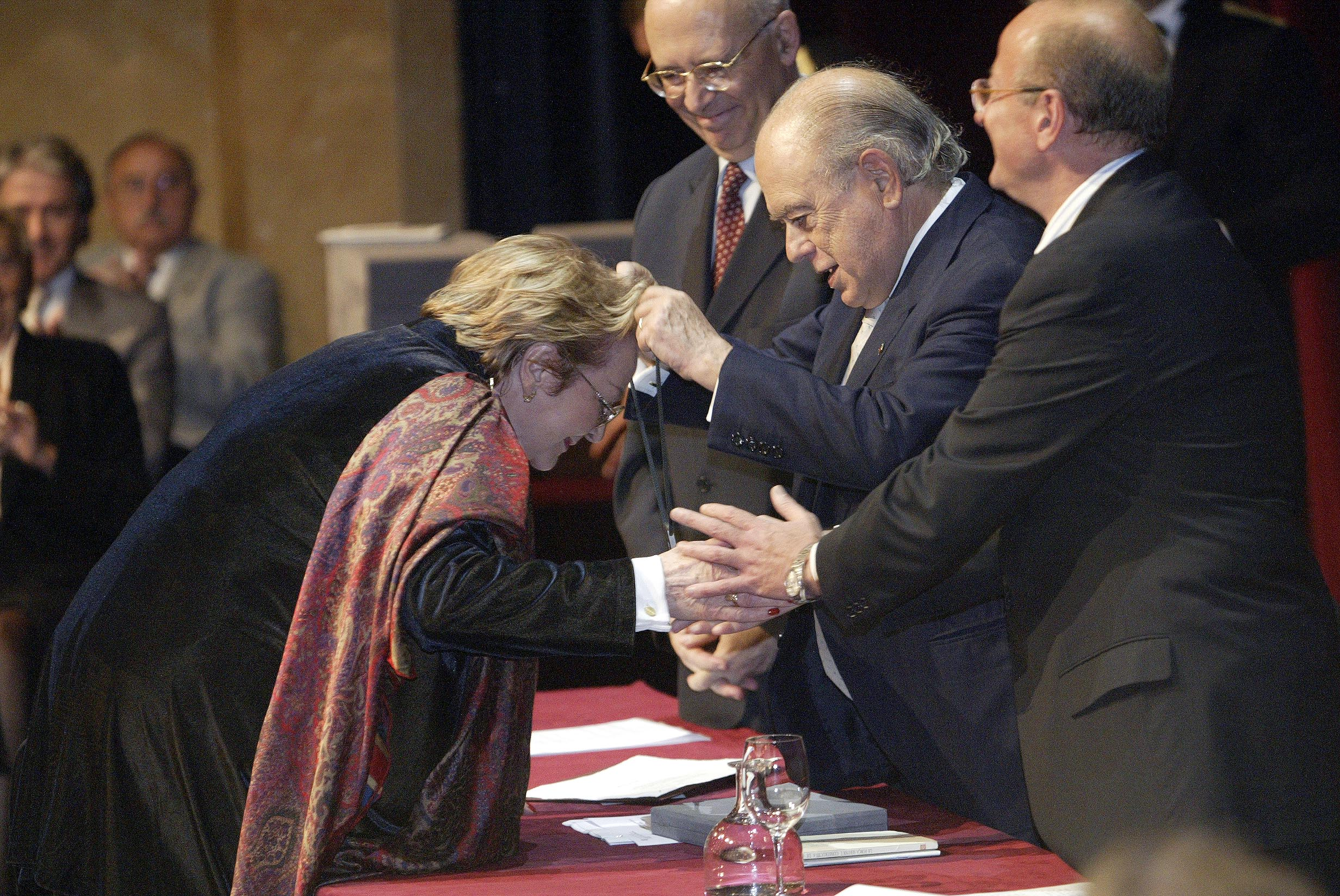
- Salvador in 2003
- Born: 21 November 1927; Tarragona, Catalonia, Spain
- Died: 15 May 2025 (aged 97)
- Occupation: Actress
- Years active: 1957–2010
- Awards: Creu de Sant Jordi

Montserrat Salvador Deop (21 November 1927 – 15 May 2025) was a Spanish actress renowned for her extensive work in theater, film, and television. She gained widespread recognition for her portrayal of Mercè Aymerich, the matriarch in the Catalan television series Nissaga de poder.

== Early life ==
Salvador was born in Tarragona, Catalonia, Spain. Following the Spanish Civil War, her family went into exile in France, where she was raised. Growing up in Paris, she began her acting career on stage, immersing herself in the French theatrical scene. She performed in Argentina, where she was directed by Margarita Xirgu, and in Colombia.

== Career ==
Salvador's professional debut in Spain occurred in 1956 when she performed with Esteve Polls' Teatro Experimental in Barcelona. That same year, she transitioned to film with her role in La cárcel de cristal, directed by Juli Coll. Over the ensuing decades, she built a diverse filmography, including notable films such as Distrito quinto (1958), La ciutat cremada (1976), La muerte de Mikel (1984), La Moños (1997), and 53 dies d’hivern (2006).

On television, Salvador became a familiar face in Catalonia, appearing in series like Poblenou, El cor de la ciutat, Hospital Central, and Cuéntame cómo pasó. Her most iconic role was as Mercè Aymerich in Nissaga de poder, where she portrayed a formidable family matriarch determined to uphold her family's prestige, even through manipulation.

In recognition of her significant contributions to the performing arts, Salvador was awarded the Creu de Sant Jordi by the Generalitat de Catalunya in 2003.

== Death ==
Salvador died on 15 May 2025, at the age of 97.

== Filmography ==
- Distrito Quinto (1958)
- Don Lucio y el hermano Pío (1960)
- Cuarenta años de novios (1963)
- Larga noche de julio (1974)
- La ciutat cremada (1976)
- Los restos del naufragio (1978)
- La Muerte de Mikel (1984)
- Daniya, jardí de l’harem (1988)
- La febre d’or (1993)
- La moños (1997)
- Caresses (1998)
- Avec tout mon amour (2001)
- 25 Kilates (2008)
- La vida empieza hoy (2010)

=== Television ===
- Nissaga de poder (1996–1997) – Mercè Aymerich
- Poble Nou (1994) – Mise
- Sóc com sóc (1990) – Encarnació Alsina i Rei
- Media naranja (1986) – Maruja
- Vida privada (1987) – Doña Leocadia
- Hospital Central (2003) – Madre de Vilches
- Cuéntame cómo pasó (2005) – Madre de Eugenio
- El cor de la ciutat (2002–2009) – Regina/Lurdes
