= Nissaga de poder =

- Genre: Soap opera
- Created by: Josep Maria Benet i Jornet; Jordi Arcarazo
- Developed by: Televisió de Catalunya
- Starring: Emma Vilarasau; Jordi Dauder; Eduard Farelo; Montserrat Salvador; Jordi Bosch
- Country of origin: Spain
- Original language: Catalan
- No. of seasons: 3
- No. of episodes: 476

Production
- Camera setup: Multi-camera
- Running time: 30 minutes approx.

Original release
- Network: TV3
- Release: January 28, 1996 – May 3, 1998

Related
- Secrets de familia; Laberint d'ombres

Nissaga de poder (English: Lineage of power) was a Catalan TV soap opera which was broadcast on TV3 from 1996 to 1998. It became one of TV3's most popular TV series. It was created by Josep Maria Benet i Jornet and adapted to TV by Jordi Arcarazo.

== Plot ==
Eulàlia and Mateu Montsolís are siblings who own a winery located in the region of Penedès, Cavas Montsolís. They are members of one of the richest families in the region.

The plot revolves around the incestuous love between Eulàlia and Mateu, which gave birth to a son, Eduard. But the Montsolís family cannot allow this to become public as the scandal would cause irreversible damage. Their official story is that Eduard is the illegitimate child of a sporadic relationship between Mateu Montsolís and one of his many lovers, Àngels Estivill. Eduard was raised by family employees Tomas and Assumpció.

The deceptions, murders, betrayals, envy and turbulent relationships between members of a powerful family in the midst of a stifling atmosphere are the plot of the series.

== Cast ==
- Emma Vilarasau ... Eulàlia Montsolís
- Jordi Dauder ... Mateu Montsolís
- Eduard Farelo ... Eduard Montsolís
- Montserrat Salvador ... Mercè Aymerich
- Jordi Bosch ... Raimon Montsolís
- Muntsa Alcañiz ... Sílvia Ribalta
- Nina ... Pilar Solano
- Mónica López ... Abril Montsolís
- Olalla Moreno ... Laia Montsolís
- David Selvas ... Fèlix Montsolís
- Marta Padován ... Assumpció Romaguera
- Jordi Banacolocha ... Tomàs Gómez
- David Bagès ... Amadeu Cabanilles
- Enric Majó ... Maurici Castro
- Mercedes Sampietro ... Montserrat Capdevila
- Víctor Pi ... Mossèn David Sollerich
- Mercè Comes ... Agustina Molins
- Lluís Marco ... Dr. Joan Vidal-Garriga
- Àlex Casanovas ... Enric Cabanes
- Biel Durán ... Toni Castro
- Mercè Lleixà ... Lluïssa Solano
- Rosa Novell ... Sofia Palau
- Núria Prims ... Mariona Montsolís
- Eva Santolaria ... Elisenda Castro
- Montse Mostaza ... Laura Vilalta
- Pep Anton Muñoz ... Gerard Vilalta
- Alfred Lucchetti ... Sebastià Vilalta
- Teresa Cunillé ... Glòria Bruguera
- Mingo Ràfols ... Roger Cànoves
- Cristina Dilla ... Neus Gracia
- Boris Ruiz ... Màrius Bertran
- Rosa Renom ... Helena Savall
- Mònica Lucchetti ... Clara Bellmunt / Isabel Pomes
- Lluís Posada ... Josep / Raimón Tarrades
- Alícia González ... Inés
- Martí Milla ... Xavier
- Pep Tosar ... Jordi
- Artur Trias ... Artur Ríus
- Ignasi Abadal ... Domènec Tubau
- Carles Arquimbau ... Josep María Clariana "Xato"
- Roser Batalla ... Sargent Mayte Aguirre
- Anna Briansó ... Judit Fontseré
- Sergio Caballero ... Damià Muntada
- Ester Formosa ... Pietat Martorell
- Carmen Fortuny ... Antònia Martorell
- Josep Linuesa ... Marçal Castro
- Mercè Montalà ... Lídia Turó
- Mónica Randall ... Aurora Jané
- Bea Segura
- Ernest Serrahima ... Miquel Capdevila
- Miquel Sitjar ... Gabriel Montsolís
- Marcel Tomàs
- Pep Torrents ... Dr. Isidre Mercader - Foraster
- Pere Ventura ... Oriol Llongueras
- Arnau Vilardebó ... Quim Balaguer
- Eulàlia Ramón ... Angels Estivill
- Jordi Martínez ... Cisco Dalmasses

== Sequel ==
On May 12, 1999, TV3 premiered a sequel called Nissaga: L'herència as a weekly series. The plot occurs 16 years after the final of the original series and is based around the following generation of the Montsolís. However, the series received poor reviews and ended on January 19, 2000, with only 26 episodes.
