= List of highest-grossing animated films in the United States and Canada =

The following are lists of highest-grossing animated films in the United States and Canada.

Included on the list are charts of the top box-office earners, a chart of high-grossing animated films adjusted for inflation.

Animated family films have performed consistently well at the box office, with Disney films enjoying lucrative re-releases prior to the home video era. Disney also enjoyed later success with its Pixar brand, of which the films from Toy Story, Finding Nemo, The Incredibles, and Inside Out have been the best performers; beyond Pixar, the Shrek, Ice Age, Madagascar and Despicable Me series have met with the most success. The Jungle Book and Mickey Mouse series saw successful returns after lying dormant for decades.

An animated feature film is defined as a motion picture with a running time of more than 40 minutes, in which movement and characters’ performances are created using a frame-by-frame technique. Motion capture by itself is not an animation technique. In addition, a significant number of the major characters must be animated, and animation must figure in no less than 75 percent of the picture's running time.

— Rule Seven - Special Rules For The Animated Feature Film Award : I. Definition

== List of highest-grossing animated films in Canada and the United States ==
† Background shading indicates films playing in the week commencing 30 October 2026 in theaters around the world.

Rank	Title	Gross	Year	Ref
1	Inside Out 2	$652,980,194	2024	
2	Incredibles 2	$608,581,744	2018	
3	The Super Mario Bros. Movie	$574,205,195	2023	
4	The Lion King	$543,638,043	2019	
5	Finding Dory	$486,295,561	2016	
6	Toy Story 5	$480,294,461	2026	
7	Frozen 2	$477,373,578	2019	
8	Moana 2	$460,405,068	2024	
9	Shrek 2	$441,226,247	2004	
10	Toy Story 4	$434,038,008	2019	
11	The Super Mario Galaxy Movie	$429,814,610	2026	
12	Zootopia 2	$428,130,160	2025	
13	The Lion King	$424,979,720	1994	
14	Toy Story 3	$415,004,880	2010	
15	Frozen	$400,738,009	2013	
16	Finding Nemo	$380,843,261	2003	
17	Spider-Man: Across the Spider-Verse	$380,277,483	2023	
18	Minions: The Rise of Gru	$369,695,210	2022	
19	The Secret Life of Pets	$368,384,330	2016	
20	Despicable Me 2	$368,061,265	2013	
21	Despicable Me 4	$361,004,205	2024	
22	Inside Out	$356,461,711	2015	
23	Zootopia	$341,268,248	2016	
24	Minions	$336,045,770	2015	
25	Shrek the Third	$322,719,944	2007	
26	Up	$293,004,164	2009	
27	Monsters, Inc.	$289,916,256	2001	
28	The Grinch	$270,620,950	2018	
29	Sing	$270,329,045	2016	
30	Monsters University	$268,492,764	2013	
31	Shrek	$267,665,011	2001	
32	Despicable Me 3	$264,624,300	2017	
33	The Incredibles	$261,441,092	2004	
34	The Lego Movie	$257,760,692	2014	
35	Mufasa: The Lion King	$254,564,553	2024	
36	Despicable Me	$251,513,985	2010	
37	Moana	$248,757,044	2016	
38	Toy Story 2	$245,852,179	1999	
39	Cars	$244,082,982	2006	
40	Shrek Forever After	$238,736,787	2010	
41	WALL-E	$223,808,164	2008	
42	Brave	$237,283,207	2012	
43	Big Hero 6	$222,527,828	2014	
44	Beauty and the Beast	$218,967,620	1991	
45	Aladdin	$217,350,219	1992	
46	How to Train Your Dragon	$217,581,231	2010	
47	Madagascar 3: Europe's Most Wanted	$216,391,482	2012	
48	Kung Fu Panda	$215,434,591	2008	
49	The Lorax	$214,030,500	2012	
50	Coco	$209,726,015	2017	

=== Computer animation ===
The following is a list of highest-grossing computer animated films in the United States and Canada.

† Background shading indicates films playing in the week commencing 30 October 2026 in theaters around the world.

Rank	Title	Gross	Year	Ref
1	Inside Out 2	$652,980,194	2024	
2	Incredibles 2	$608,581,744	2018	
3	The Super Mario Bros. Movie	$574,205,195	2023	
4	The Lion King	$543,638,043	2019	
5	Finding Dory	$486,295,561	2016	
6	Toy Story 5	$480,294,461	2026	
7	Frozen 2	$477,373,578	2019	
8	Moana 2	$460,405,068	2024	
9	Shrek 2	$441,226,247	2004	
10	Toy Story 4	$434,038,008	2019	
11	The Super Mario Galaxy Movie	$429,814,610	2026	
12	Zootopia 2	$428,130,160	2025	
13	Toy Story 3	$415,004,880	2010	
14	Frozen	$400,738,009	2013	
15	Finding Nemo	$380,843,261	2003	
16	Spider-Man: Across the Spider-Verse	$380,277,483	2023	
17	Minions: The Rise of Gru	$369,695,210	2022	
18	The Secret Life of Pets	$368,384,330	2016	
19	Despicable Me 2	$368,061,265	2013	
20	Despicable Me 4	$361,004,205	2024	
21	Inside Out	$356,461,711	2015	
22	Zootopia	$341,268,248	2016	
23	Minions	$336,045,770	2015	
24	Shrek the Third	$322,719,944	2007	
25	Up	$293,004,164	2009	
26	Monsters, Inc.	$289,916,256	2001	
27	The Grinch	$270,620,950	2018	
28	Sing	$270,395,425	2016	
29	Monsters University	$268,492,764	2013	
30	Shrek	$267,665,011	2001	
31	Despicable Me 3	$264,624,300	2017	
32	The Incredibles	$261,441,092	2004	
33	The Lego Movie	$257,760,692	2014	
34	Mufasa: The Lion King	$254,564,553	2024	
35	Despicable Me	$251,513,985	2010	
36	Moana	$248,757,044	2016	
37	Toy Story 2	$245,852,179	1999	
38	Cars	$244,082,982	2006	
39	Shrek Forever After	$238,736,787	2010	
40	Brave	$237,283,207	2012	
41	WALL-E	$223,808,164	2008	
42	Big Hero 6	$222,527,828	2014	
43	How to Train Your Dragon	$217,581,231	2010	
44	Madagascar 3: Europe's Most Wanted	$216,391,482	2012	
45	Kung Fu Panda	$215,434,591	2008	
46	The Lorax	$214,030,500	2012	
47	Coco	$209,726,015	2017	
48	Ratatouille	$206,445,654	2007	
49	Ralph Breaks the Internet	$201,091,711	2018	
50	Tangled	$200,821,936	2010	

=== Stop-motion animation ===
The following is a list of highest-grossing stop motion animated films in Canada and the United States.

Rank	Title	Gross	Year	Ref
1	Chicken Run	$106,834,564	2000	
2	Coraline	$75,286,229	2009	
3	The Nightmare Before Christmas	$75,082,668	1993	
4	Wallace & Gromit: The Curse of the Were-Rabbit	$56,110,897	2005	
5	ParaNorman	$56,003,051	2012	
6	Corpse Bride	$53,359,111	2005	
7	The Boxtrolls	$50,837,305	2014	
8	Kubo and the Two Strings	$48,023,088	2016	
9	Fantastic Mr. Fox	$46,471,023	2009	
10	Frankenweenie	$35,291,068	2012	
11	The Pirates! Band of Misfits	$31,051,126	2012	
12	Isle of Dogs	$30,871,993	2018	
13	James and the Giant Peach	$28,946,127	1996	
14	Shaun the Sheep Movie	$19,375,982	2015	
15	Missing Link	$16,649,539	2019	
16	Early Man	$8,267,544	2018	
17	Monkeybone	$5,411,999	2001	
18	Anomalisa	$3,759,286	2015	
19	The Little Prince	$1,339,152	2016	
20	Wallace & Gromit: The Best of Aardman Animation	$1,009,577	1996	
21	The Adventures of Mark Twain	$849,915	1985	
22	Memoir of a Snail	$627,448	2024	
23	Mad God	$325,042	2022	
24	My Life as a Zucchini	$309,766	2016	
25	The Inventor	$306,385	2023	
26	The Secret Adventures of Tom Thumb	$70,441	1993	
27	Toys in the Attic	$64,918	2009	

=== Traditional animated films ===
The following is a list of highest-grossing traditional animated films in the United States and Canada.

Rank	Title	Gross	Year	Ref
1	The Lion King	$422,783,777	1994	
2	Beauty and the Beast	$218,967,620	1991	
3	Aladdin	$217,350,219	1992	
4	Snow White and the Seven Dwarfs	$184,925,486	1937	
5	The Simpsons Movie	$183,135,014	2007	
6	Tarzan	$171,091,819	1999	
7	The SpongeBob Movie: Sponge Out of Water	$162,994,032	2015	
8	Lilo & Stitch	$145,794,338	2002	
9	One Hundred and One Dalmatians	$144,880,014	1961	
10	The Jungle Book	$141,843,612	1967	
11	Pocahontas	$141,579,773	1995	
12	Mulan	$120,620,254	1998	
13	The Little Mermaid	$111,543,479	1989	
14	Demon Slayer: Infinity Castle	$106,300,651	2025	
15	The Princess and the Frog	$104,400,899	2009	
16	Bambi	$102,247,150	1942	
17	The Prince of Egypt	$101,413,188	1998	
18	The Rugrats Movie	$100,494,675	1998	
19	The Hunchback of Notre Dame	$100,138,851	1996	
20	Hercules	$99,112,101	1997	
21	Lady and the Tramp	$93,602,326	1955	
22	Cinderella	$93,141,149	1950	
23	Peter Pan	$87,404,651	1953	
24	Pokémon: The First Movie	$85,744,662	1999	
25	The SpongeBob SquarePants Movie	$85,417,988	2004	
26	Brother Bear	$85,336,277	2003	
27	Pinocchio	$84,254,167	1940	
28	Atlantis: The Lost Empire	$84,056,472	2001	
29	Fantasia	$83,320,000	1940	
30	Rugrats in Paris: The Movie	$76,507,756	1999	
31	Oliver & Company	$74,151,346	1988	
32	Spirit: Stallion of the Cimarron	$73,280,117	2002	
33	The Rescuers	$71,215,869	1977	
34	The Fox and the Hound	$63,456,988	1981	
35	Beavis and Butt-Head Do America	$63,118,386	1996	
36	Fantasia 2000	$60,655,420	2000	
37	Anastasia	$58,406,347	1997	
38	Curious George	$58,360,760	2006	
39	The Aristocats	$55,675,257	1970	
40	Sleeping Beauty	$51,600,000	1959	
41	Home on the Range	$50,030,461	2004	
42	Demon Slayer: Kimetsu no Yaiba – The Movie: Mugen Train	$49,505,008	2020	
43	Return to Never Land	$48,430,258	2002	
44	The Land Before Time	$48,092,846	1988	
45	The Jungle Book 2	$47,901,582	2003	
46	An American Tail	$47,483,002	1986	
47	The Boy and the Heron	$46,832,867	2023	
48	The Tigger Movie	$45,554,533	2000	
49	Pokémon the Movie 2000	$43,758,684	2000	
50	The Wild Thornberrys Movie	$40,108,697	2002	

=== Anime films ===
The following is a list of highest-grossing anime films in the United States and Canada.

#	Title	Box office	Year	Ref(s)
1	Demon Slayer: Infinity Castle	$136,950,340	2025	
2	Pokémon: The First Movie	$85,744,662	1999	
3	Demon Slayer: Kimetsu no Yaiba the Movie: Mugen Train	$49,888,550	2020	
4	The Boy and the Heron	$46,832,867	2023	
5	Pokémon the Movie 2000	$43,746,923	2000	
6	Chainsaw Man – The Movie: Reze Arc	$43,261,604	2025	
7	Dragon Ball Super: Super Hero	$38,112,140	2022	
8	Jujutsu Kaisen 0: The Movie	$34,542,754	2021	
9	Dragon Ball Super: Broly	$30,712,119	2018	
10	Yu-Gi-Oh! The Movie: Pyramid of Light	$19,887,556	2004	
11	The Secret World of Arrietty	$19,202,743	2012	
12	Demon Slayer: Kimetsu no Yaiba – To the Hashira Training	$17,657,658	2024	
13	Pokémon 3: The Movie	$17,052,128	2001	
14	Ponyo	$15,743,471	2009	
15	Spirited Away	$15,205,725	2002	
16	My Hero Academia: Heroes Rising	$13,304,000	2020	
17	One Piece Film: Red	$12,775,324	2022	
18	My Hero Academia: World Heroes' Mission	$12,271,658	2021	
19	Suzume	$10,932,037	2023	
20	Demon Slayer: Kimetsu No Yaiba - To the Swordsmith Village	$10,117,806	2023	
21	Digimon: The Movie	$9,631,153	2000	
22	Weathering with You	$8,056,636	2019	
23	Dragon Ball Z: Resurrection 'F'	$8,008,363	2015	
24	Howl's Moving Castle	$6,789,268	2005	
25	My Hero Academia: Two Heroes	$5,754,556	2018	
26	The Wind Rises	$5,209,580	2014	
27	My Hero Academia: You're Next	$5,041,781	2024	
28	Your Name	$5,017,246	2016	
29	Princess Mononoke	$4,845,631	1999	
30	Belle	$4,018,313	2021	
31	Dragon Ball Z: Battle of Gods	$2,553,002	2014	
32	Promare	$2,529,324	2019	
33	Mary and the Witch's Flower	$2,418,404	2018	
34	My Neighbor Totoro	$2,250,213	2017	
35	Pokémon 4Ever	$1,727,447	2002	
36	Sword Art Online The Movie: Ordinal Scale	$1,522,976	2017	
37	One Piece: Stampede	$1,298,528	2019	
38	KonoSuba: God's Blessing on This Wonderful World! Legend of Crimson	$1,134,786	2019	
39	Sword Art Online Progressive: Aria of a Starless Night	$1,050,000	2021	
40	Ghost in the Shell 2: Innocence	$1,043,896	2004	
41	Yu-Gi-Oh! The Dark Side of Dimensions	$1,015,339	2017	
42	From Up on Poppy Hill	$1,002,895	2013	
43	Cowboy Bebop: The Movie	$1,000,045	2001	
44	Boruto: Naruto the Movie	$919,651	2015	
45	Paprika	$882,267	2006	
46	Mirai	$812,794	2018	
47	Sailor Moon R: The Movie	$787,750	2017	
48	Pokémon Heroes	$746,381	2002	
49	Metropolis	$722,932	2001	
50	The Tale of the Princess Kaguya	$703,232	2013	

== Highest-grossing animated films adjusted for inflation ==
These charts were compiled based on data from Box Office Mojo, by dividing the gross by the average ticket price to calculate an estimate of the total number of admissions. Admissions better reflect the popularity of older films, since they are less susceptible to the effects of inflation.

Many of the films on this list released prior to the availability of home video have had multiple releases. Note these lists are based on 2016 prices.

Highest-grossing animated films adjusted for inflation
Rank	Title	Adjusted gross	Year	Ref
1	Snow White and the Seven Dwarfs	$927,590,000	1937	
2	One Hundred and One Dalmatians	$850,295,800	1961	
3	The Lion King	$758,636,100	1994	
4	Fantasia (Note: Not including 2016 reissue)	$706,700,000	1940	
5	The Jungle Book	$627,016,100	1967	
6	Sleeping Beauty	$618,473,200	1959	
7	Shrek 2	$604,643,400	2004	
8	Incredibles 2	$581,143,700	2018	
9	Pinocchio	$573,602,400	1940	
10	Bambi	$542,192,900	1942	

=== Highest-grossing computer animated films adjusted for inflation ===
Highest-grossing computer animated films adjusted for inflation
Rank	Title	Adjusted gross	Year	Ref
1	Shrek 2	$604,643,400	2004	
2	Finding Nemo	$524,101,200	2003	
3	Finding Dory	$477,970,600	2016	
4	Toy Story 3	$444,237,900	2010	
5	Monsters, Inc.	$419,995,000	2001	
6	Frozen	$417,339,100	2013	
7	Toy Story 2	$407,088,800	1999	
8	Shrek	$402,443,300	2001	
9	Shrek the Third	$399,178,300	2007	
10	Despicable Me 2	$399,068,800	2013	

=== Highest-grossing stop motion animated films adjusted for inflation ===
Highest-grossing stop motion films
Rank	Title	Adjusted gross	Year	Ref
1	Chicken Run	$168,675,700	2000	
2	The Nightmare Before Christmas	$134,396,500	1993	
3	Coraline	$85,882,800	2009	
4	Wallace & Gromit: The Curse of the Were-Rabbit	$74,486,500	2005	
5	Corpse Bride	$70,840,300	2005	
6	ParaNorman	$61,153,600	2012	
7	James and the Giant Peach	$55,731,100	1996	
8	The Boxtrolls	$52,134,300	2014	
9	Kubo and the Two Strings	$48,023,100	2016	
10	Frankenweenie	$37,318,200	2012	

=== Highest-grossing traditional animated films adjusted for inflation ===
Highest-grossing traditional animated films adjusted for inflation
Rank	Title	Adjusted gross	Year	Ref
1	Snow White and the Seven Dwarfs	$927,590,000	1937	
2	One Hundred and One Dalmatians	$850,295,800	1961	
3	The Lion King	$758,636,100	1994	
4	Fantasia (Note: "Fantasia" Not including 2016 reissue)	$706,700,000	1940	
5	The Jungle Book	$627,016,100	1967	
6	Sleeping Beauty	$618,473,200	1959	
7	Pinocchio	$573,602,400	1940	
8	Bambi	$542,192,900	1942	
9	Cinderella	$513,165,200	1950	
10	Lady and the Tramp	$474,303,900	1953	

== See also ==
- Lists of highest-grossing films
  - List of highest-grossing films
    - List of highest-grossing films in the United States and Canada
  - List of highest-grossing animated films
    - List of highest-grossing live-action/animated films
    - List of highest-grossing openings for animated films
- List of most expensive animated films
