= List of animated films by box office admissions =

The following is a list of animated films by the number of tickets sold at the box office.

== List ==
In total, 34 animated films have sold more than 40 million tickets. The most notable years are 2001 with three films, 2016 with 4 films, and 2019 with 5 films, while Toy Story is the most represented franchise with four films. Disney produced the most, with a total of 28 films on the list. Ne Zha 2 is the first film to hold the #1 spot to not be produced by Disney and to be in CGI.

Some of the data is incomplete due to a lack of available admissions data from a number of countries. It is not an exhaustive list of all the highest-grossing animated films by ticket sales, and no rankings are given.

† Background shading indicates films playing in the week commencing 30 October 2026 in theaters around the world.

Worldwide ticket sales (since 1955)
Film	Year	Known ticket sales (est.)	Notes
Ne Zha 2	2025	327,567,494	(Note: Ne Zha 2 admissions: China – 325,000,000; United States – 2,062,000; United Kingdom – 140,000; Russia – 171,374; France – 62,375; Germany – 46,336; Spain – 39,673; Italy – 22,315; Brazil – 19,469; Austria – 3,952)
The Jungle Book	1967	264,936,054	(Note: The Jungle Book (1967) admissions: United States and United Kingdom – 220,500,000; Germany – 27,300,000; France, Sweden, Argentina, Spain, Denmark, Austria, Italy, Finland – 17,136,054)
The Lion King	2019	227,008,637	(Note: The Lion King (2019): United States and Canada – 60,322,700; Argentina, Australia, Bolivia, Chile, Colombia, Mexico, Peru, Serbia, Sweden, Switzerland, Ukraine, United Arab Emirates, United Kingdom – 51,829,198; Austria, Belgium, Bosnia and Herzegovina, Bulgaria, Croatia, Cyprus, Czech Republic, Denmark, Estonia, Finland, France, Germany, Greece, Hungary, Iceland, Ireland, Italy, Latvia, Lithuania, Luxembourg, Montenegro, Netherlands, North Macedonia, Norway, Poland, Portugal, Romania, Slovakia, Slovenia – 35,848,975; Brazil and Spain – 22,713,564; China – 22,493,782; Russia – 12,729,733; India – 10,900,000; South Korea – 4,743,295; Japan – 4,660,000; Turkey – 767,390)
Snow White and the Seven Dwarfs	1937	218,491,031	(Note: Snow White and the Seven Dwarfs: United States – 166,387,000; United Kingdom – 28,000,000; France – 18,353,225; Germany – 4,201,480; Italy – 1,330,316; European re-releases (2001–2022) – 218,888; South Korea – 122)
Zootopia 2	2025	217,482,358	(Note: Zootopia 2: United States – 37,854,000; China – 117,000,000; France, Germany, Brazil, South Korea, Spain, Italy, Russia – 38,133,521; Other European countries – 12,793,447; Japan – 11,701,390)
One Hundred and One Dalmatians	1961	199,800,000	
Fantasia	1940	182,128,748	
Frozen 2	2019	177,007,599	(Note: Frozen II: France, Germany, Norway, Poland, Portugal, Russia, Serbia, South Korea, Sweden, Switzerland, Ukraine, United States and Canada – 95,933,859; China – 25,340,000; Austria, Belgium, Bosnia and Herzegovina, Bulgaria, Croatia, Cyprus, Czech Republic, Denmark, Estonia, Finland, Greece, Hungary, Iceland, Ireland, Italy, Latvia, Lithuania, Luxembourg, Montenegro, Netherlands, North Macedonia, Romania, Slovakia, Slovenia, Turkey, United Kingdom – 21,176,815; Mexico – 10,557,083; Japan – 10,440,000; Brazil – 7,972,757; Spain – 3,505,078; Argentina – 2,082,007)
The Super Mario Bros. Movie	2023	168,100,000	
Inside Out 2	2024	161,300,000	
Incredibles 2	2018	159,064,742	(Note: Incredibles 2: Australia, Brazil, Chile, Colombia, Mexico, United States and Canada – 100,893,812; Austria, Belgium, Bosnia and Herzegovina, Bulgaria, Croatia, Cyprus, Czech Republic, Denmark, Estonia, Finland, France, Germany, Greece, Hungary, Iceland, Ireland, Italy, Latvia, Lithuania, Luxembourg, Montenegro, Morocco, Netherlands, North Macedonia, Norway, Romania, Slovakia, Slovenia, Spain, Sweden, Turkey, United Kingdom – 28,778,575; China – 10,122,096; Poland, Russia, Venezuela – 7,317,439; Japan – 4,060,000; Argentina – 3,530,866; South Korea – 3,033,105; Portugal – 606,756; Ukraine – 474,430; Switzerland – 247,663)
The Lion King	1994	153,959,873	(Note: The Lion King (1994): United States and Canada – 89,434,585; Argentina, Austria, Belgium, Denmark, Finland, Sweden, United Kingdom – 14,461,270; Germany – 11,899,893; France – 10,744,990; Italy – 8,640,000; Spain – 6,457,397; European re-releases (1996–2021) – 4,332,546; Brazil – 4,288,244; Netherlands – 2,780,000; South Korea – 920,948)
Frozen	2013	142,925,342	(Note: Frozen: Austria, Belgium, Bulgaria, Croatia, Cyprus, Czech Republic, Estonia, Finland, Germany, Greece, Hungary, Iceland, Ireland, Italy, Latvia, Lithuania, Luxembourg, Montenegro, Netherlands, North Macedonia, Poland, Portugal, Russia, Slovenia, Spain, Sweden, Switzerland, Turkey, United Kingdom, United States and Canada – 81,195,156; Japan, Norway, South Korea – 30,841,405; Bolivia, China, Denmark, Mexico, Paraguay, Romania, Slovakia, Ukraine, Uruguay – 17,232,610; Argentina, Brazil, Chile, Colombia – 8,504,316; France – 5,151,855)
Ne Zha	2019	140,000,000	
Finding Nemo	2003	132,171,209	(Note: Finding Nemo: Bulgaria, Croatia, Czech Republic, Denmark, Estonia, Finland, Greece, Hungary, Iceland, Ireland, Lithuania, Luxembourg, Netherlands, Poland, Portugal, Romania, Russia, Slovakia, Slovenia, Sweden, Turkey, United States and Canada – 69,454,064; Australia, Austria, Belgium, France, Italy, Spain – 25,449,716; Argentina, Brazil, Japan, Norway – 16,220,936; United Kingdom – 9,790,000; Germany – 8,839,999; South Korea – 1,286,412; Switzerland – 1,130,082)
Shrek 2	2004	123,023,527	(Note: Shrek 2: United States and Canada – 71,050,900; Europe (excluding Russia) – 44,617,071; Argentina, Australia, Brazil, Chile, Russia, South Korea – 7,355,556)
Despicable Me 3	2017	120,392,387	(Note: Despicable Me 3: United States – 29,501,000; Brazil, China, Russia, South Korea, Spain – 53,688,840; United Kingdom – 6,400,000; Japan – 6,220,000; Other European countries – 24,582,547)
Moana	2016	119,000,000	
Minions: The Rise of Gru	2022	104,600,000	
Moana 2	2024	100,600,000	
Demon Slayer: Kimetsu no Yaiba – The Movie: Infinity Castle †	2025	98,520,310	
Despicable Me 2	2013	94,400,000	
Despicable Me 4	2024	92,000,000	
Aladdin	1992	90,290,784	(Note: Aladdin (1992) admissions: United States and Canada – 52,442,300; France, Germany, Italy, Spain – 21,074,285; United Kingdom – 8,300,000; Japan – 4,550,835; Australia – 2,753,072; South Korea (Seoul City) – 647,266; Denmark – 522,350; Finland and Switzerland (1996–2015) – 676)
The Super Mario Galaxy Movie †	2026	87,356,214	(Note: The Super Mario Galaxy Movie admissions: United States – 37,762,000; Japan – 4,947,393; Brazil, China, France, Germany, Italy, Russia, Spain – 21,564,771; Mexico – 14,810,000; United Kingdom – 4,700,000; South Korea – 1,606,328; Argentina – 1,159,454; United Arab Emirates – 353,188; Czech Republic – 195,858; Greece – 164,368; Hungary – 140,369; Finland – 136,106; Bulgaria – 90,982; Slovakia – 78,585)
Finding Dory	2016	85,224,421	(Note: Finding Dory: United States and Canada – 56,158,100; Europe and Morocco – 29,066,321)
Bambi	1942	84,879,233	(Note: Bambi admissions: United States and Canada – 63,712,400; France – 12,159,335; United Kingdom – 9 million; Finland, Denmark, Spain (1997–2017) – 7,498)
Cinderella	1950	84,458,172	(Note: Cinderella (1950) admissions: United States and Canada – 60,301,400; France – 13,226,772; United Kingdom and Spain – 10.93 million)
Pinocchio	1940	83,739,255	(Note: Pinocchio: United States and Canada – 67,403,300; United Kingdom and France – 16,335,702; Netherlands (1999) – 253)
The Incredibles	2004	81,622,988	(Note: The Incredibles: Austria, Belgium, Bulgaria, Czech Republic, Denmark, Estonia, Finland, France, Hungary, Iceland, Ireland, Latvia, Luxembourg, Netherlands, Norway, Poland, Portugal, Romania, Slovakia, Slovenia, Sweden, Switzerland, Turkey, United Kingdom, United States and Canada – 61,022,168; Brazil, Japan, Spain – 12,861,883; Germany – 3,502,028; Italy – 3,081,842; South Korea – 1,155,067)
Sleeping Beauty	1959	79,314,145	(Note: Sleeping Beauty: United States and Canada – 72,676,100; France – 6,586,592; South Korea (Seoul City) – 42,868; Finland, Italy, Finland (1996–2013) – 8,585)
Inside Out	2015	77,600,000	
How to Train Your Dragon 2	2014	71,688,507	(Note: How to Train Your Dragon 2: Austria, Belgium, Bulgaria, Croatia, Cyprus, Czech Republic, Denmark, Estonia, Finland, France, Germany, Greece, Hungary, Iceland, Ireland, Italy, Latvia, Lithuania, Luxembourg, Montenegro, Netherlands, North Macedonia, Norway, Poland, Portugal, Romania, Slovakia, Slovenia, Sweden, Turkey, United Kingdom, United States and Canada – 38,100,225; Argentina, Brazil, Chile, Colombia, Mexico, Russia – 18,032,485; China – 10,503,359; South Korea – 3,000,115; Spain – 1,770,576; Switzerland – 281,747)
How to Train Your Dragon: The Hidden World	2019	68,696,776	(Note: How to Train Your Dragon: The Hidden World: United States and Canada – 17,846,800; Austria, Belgium, Bosnia and Herzegovina, Bulgaria, Croatia, Cyprus, Czech Republic, Denmark, Estonia, Finland, France, Hungary, Iceland, Ireland, Italy, Latvia, Lithuania, Luxembourg, Montenegro, Netherlands, North Macedonia, Norway, Poland, Portugal, Slovakia, Slovenia, Spain, Turkey, United Kingdom – 14,737,416; China – 10,082,625; Mexico – 8,046,775; Russia – 7,975,087; Brazil – 3,945,533; Germany – 2,270,132; South Korea – 1,507,922; Argentina – 925,839; Ukraine – 823,308; Switzerland – 224,547; Romania – 182,746; Greece – 128,046)
Lady and the Tramp	1955	67,351,673	(Note: Lady and the Tramp: United States and Canada – 55,734,900; France and Denmark – 11,616,773)
Demon Slayer: Mugen Train	2020	57,600,000	
Toy Story 3	2010	53,339,400	
Monsters, Inc.	2001	49,353,100	
How to Train Your Dragon	2010	48,928,891	(Note: How to Train Your Dragon: United States and Canada – 27,619,200; Austria, Belgium, Czech Republic, Denmark, Estonia, Finland, France, Greece, Hungary, Ireland, Latvia, Lithuania, Netherlands, Norway, Poland, Portugal, Romania, Russia, Slovakia, Slovenia, Spain, Sweden, Switzerland, Turkey, United Kingdom – 14,059,885; South Korea – 2,603,857; Brazil and Ukraine – 2,315,984; Germany – 1,625,651; Italy – 704,314)
Despicable Me	2010	48,270,929	
Toy Story 4	2019	48,168,700	
Toy Story	1995	47,902,800	
Toy Story 2	1999	47,836,500	
Shrek	2001	47,290,600	
Shrek the Third	2007	46,907,000	
Spirited Away	2001	46,375,221	(Note: Spirited Away admissions: Japan – 24.28 million; China – 15,722,581; Europe – 2,995,684; United States and Canada – 1,961,800; South Korea (Seoul City) – 937,459; Brazil and Argentina – 477,697)
Peter Pan	1953	45,623,500	
Beauty and the Beast	1991	45,363,700	
Your Name	2016	44,642,412	(Note: Your Name admissions: Japan – 19.3 million; China – 20,211,429; South Korea – 3,712,891; Europe (excluding Russia and Spain) – 627,384; United States and Canada – 560,600; Russia and Argentina – 169,600; Spain – 60,508)
The Secret Life of Pets	2016	43,273,800	
Minions	2015	40,714,200	

== Computer animation ==
In total, 34 computer-animated films have sold more than 30 million tickets. The most represented year is 2016 with four films, while Shrek and Toy Story are the franchises with the most film, with four each. Pixar produced the most, with 16 films on the list.

Some of the data is incomplete due to a lack of available admissions data from a number of countries. It is not an exhaustive list of all the highest-grossing computer-animated films by ticket sales, and no rankings are given.

Film	Year	Known ticket sales (est.)	Notes
Ne Zha 2	2025	327,567,494	
The Lion King	2019	227,008,637	
Zootopia 2	2025	217,426,358	
Frozen 2	2019	177,007,599	
The Super Mario Bros. Movie	2023	168,100,000	
Incredibles 2	2018	159,064,742	
Frozen	2013	142,925,342	
Ne Zha	2019	140,000,000	
Finding Nemo	2003	132,171,209	
Moana	2016	128,800,000	
Shrek 2	2004	123,023,527	
Despicable Me 3	2017	120,392,387	
Moana 2	2024	100,600,000	
Despicable Me 2	2013	94,400,000	
Despicable Me 4	2024	92,000,000	
The Super Mario Galaxy Movie †	2026	87,356,214	
Finding Dory	2016	85,224,421	
The Incredibles	2004	81,622,988	
Inside Out	2015	77,600,000	
How to Train Your Dragon 2	2014	71,688,507	
How to Train Your Dragon: The Hidden World	2019	68,696,776	
Toy Story 3	2010	53,339,400	
Monsters, Inc.	2001	49,353,100	
How to Train Your Dragon	2010	48,928,891	
Despicable Me	2010	48,270,929	
Toy Story 4	2019	48,168,700	
Shrek	2001	47,290,600	
Shrek the Third	2007	46,907,000	
The Secret Life of Pets	2016	43,273,800	
Toy Story	1995	47,902,800	
Toy Story 2	1999	47,836,500	
Minions	2015	40,714,200	
Zootopia	2016	39,606,100	
Up	2009	39,273,800	
Cars	2006	37,264,600	
A Bug's Life	1998	34,135,500	
Monsters University	2013	33,200,400	
The Lego Movie	2014	32,315,300	
WALL-E	2008	31,170,900	
Sing	2016	30,666,400	
Ice Age	2002	30,359,300	
Shrek Forever After	2010	30,331,000	
Madagascar	2005	30,202,100	
Happy Feet	2006	30,011,700	
Ratatouille	2007	30,006,600	
Kung Fu Panda	2008	30,004,800	

== Traditional animation ==
In total, 29 traditionally animated films have sold over 20 million tickets. The most represented year is 1998 with four films. Disney produced the most, with 21 films on the list.

Some of the data is incomplete due to a lack of available admissions data from a number of countries. It is not an exhaustive list of all the highest-grossing traditionally animated films by ticket sales, and no rankings are given.

Film	Year	Known ticket sales (est.)	Notes
The Jungle Book	1967	264,936,054	
Snow White and the Seven Dwarfs	1937	218,491,031	
One Hundred and One Dalmatians	1961	199,800,000	
Fantasia	1940	182,128,748	
The Lion King	1994	153,959,873	
Demon Slayer: Kimetsu no Yaiba – The Movie: Infinity Castle †	2025	98,520,310	
Aladdin	1992	90,290,784	
Bambi	1942	84,879,233	
Cinderella	1950	84,458,172	
Pinocchio	1940	83,739,255	
Sleeping Beauty	1959	79,314,145	
Lady and the Tramp	1955	67,351,673	
Demon Slayer: Mugen Train	2020	57,600,000	
Spirited Away	2001	46,375,221	
Peter Pan	1953	45,623,500	
Beauty and the Beast	1991	45,363,700	
Your Name	2016	44,642,412	
Pokémon: The First Movie	1998	36,837,706	(Note: Pokémon: The First Movie admissions: Japan – 6.65 million; United States and Canada – 16,858,300; Europe – 12,679,046; Brazil – 468,000; South Korea (Seoul City) – 182,360)
The Prince of Egypt	1998	35,638,647	
Tarzan	1999	33,673,400	
Pocahontas	1995	32,547,100	
The Little Mermaid	1989	26,487,400	
Mulan	1998	25,718,600	
Lilo & Stitch	2002	25,093,700	
The Rescuers	1977	24,780,800	
The Hunchback of Notre Dame	1996	22,655,800	
Howl's Moving Castle	2004	21,943,336	(Note: Howl's Moving Castle admissions: Japan and South Korea – 18.52 million; France and Germany – 1,741,585; United States and Canada – 831,000; Europe (excluding France and Germany) – 764,445; Brazil – 86,306)
Weathering with You	2019	21,681,965	(Note: Weathering with You: Japan – 10 million; China – 8,985,208; United States and Canada – 852,398; Taiwan – 690,000; South Korea – 659,387; France, Germany, Spain – 330,072; Russia – 164,900)
Hercules	1997	21,593,100	
The Rugrats Movie	1998	21,197,200	

== Stop motion ==
The following table lists known estimated box office ticket sales for various high-grossing stop motion films. Laika produced the most, with six films, while the most represented year is 2012 with three films.

Some of the data is incomplete due to a lack of available admissions data from a number of countries. It is not an exhaustive list of all the highest-grossing stop motion films by ticket sales, and no rankings are given.

Title	Ticket sales (est.)	Year	Ref
Chicken Run	19,820,900	2000	
Coraline	10,038,163	2009	
Wallace & Gromit: The Curse of the Were-Rabbit	8,746,878	2005	
Corpse Bride	8,324,354	2005	
ParaNorman	7,035,559	2012	
James and the Giant Peach	6,543,272	1996	
The Boxtrolls	6,221,610	2014	
Kubo and the Two Strings	5,551,802	2016	
The Nightmare Before Christmas	4,494,150	1993	
Frankenweenie	4,432,208	2012	
The Pirates! In an Adventure with Scientists!	3,900,895	2012	
Isle of Dogs	3,514,295	2018	
Fantastic Mr. Fox	2,788,001	2009	
Shaun the Sheep Movie	2,298,455	2015	
Missing Link	1,827,611	2019	

== See also ==
- List of films by box office admissions
- List of highest-grossing animated films
- List of highest-grossing anime films
- Lists of highest-grossing films
