= El pasajero clandestino =

- Theatrical release poster
- El passatger clandestí
- Based on: Le Passager clandestin by Georges Simenon
- Written by: André Graill; Pierre Javaux; Agustí Villaronga
- Directed by: Agustí Villaronga
- Starring: Simon Callow; Bruno Todeschini; Mercè Pons; Frédéric Yrondi; Rosa Novell; Alexandre Zloto; Jesusa Andany; Enric Arredondo; Marie Atger; Jean Marie Barsinas; Cecilia Bellorin; Araceli Bruch; Jordi Dauder; Josep Maria Domènech; François Ellis; Maito Fernández; Josep Minguell; Colette Pietri-Audemars; Joan Potau; Alain Sens-Cazenave; Jordi Serra; Tiki Village
- Music by: Béatrice Thiriet
- Countries of origin: France; Spain
- Original languages: Catalan; Spanish

Production
- Producer: Daniel Delume
- Cinematography: Carles Gusi
- Editors: Amat Carreras; Thierry Dorval
- Running time: 96 minutes
- Production companies: La Sept-Arte; Massa d'Or Produccions; Pierre Javaux Productions; Tornasol Films

Original release
- Release: 13 October 1995 (France)
- Release: 8 March 1996 (Spain)

El pasajero clandestino (Catalan: El passatger clandestí) is a 1995 French-Spanish drama television film directed by Agustí Villaronga. It is adapted from the Georges Simenon novel of the same name and has a runtime of 96 minutes. It is a part of Cycle Simenon.

The film was made in the French language and dubs in Castilian Spanish and Catalan were made. The actors and actresses in the film originated from various countries.

Another film adaptation of the same book, titled The Stowaway, was released in 1958.

== Plot ==
Several persons try to take control of the inheritance of a recently deceased English film magnate. They travel to Papeete, French Polynesia to look for the heir.

Villaronga himself said that this was a very "light" adaptation.

== Cast ==
- Simon Callow as Major Owens
- Bruno Todeschini as Alfred Mougins
- Mercè Pons as Lotte
- Frédéric Yrondi as René Maréchal
- Rosa Novell as Arlette Maréchal
- Alexandre Zloto as Funke
- Jesusa Andany as Ms. Justin
- Enric Arredondo as Commander
- Marie Atger as Mariette
- Jean Marie Barsinas as Kekela
- Cecilia Bellorin as Maid
- Araceli Bruch as Nurse
- Jordi Dauder as Sheldrake
- Josep Maria Domènech as Joe Hill
- François Ellis as Matala
- Maito Fernández as Presenter
- Josep Minguell as Bonner
- Colette Pietri-Audemars as Ms. Roy
- Joan Potau as Mac Lean
- Alain Sens-Cazenave as Mr. Justin
- Jordi Serra as Phips
- Tiki Village as Pastor

== Reception ==
Pilar Pedraza, the author of Agustí Villaronga, argued that the film was an "interesting experience" (una experiencia interesante).
