= Lists of highest-grossing films =

The following are lists of highest-grossing films.

== Worldwide grosses lists ==
=== Worldwide grosses ===
- List of highest-grossing films
  - List of highest-grossing non-English films
  - List of highest-grossing Bengali films
  - List of highest-grossing puppet films
  - List of highest-grossing R-rated films
  - List of highest-grossing independent films
- List of films by box office admissions
  - List of animated films by box office admissions

=== Animated films grosses ===
- List of highest-grossing animated films
  - List of highest-grossing animated films of the 1980s
  - List of highest-grossing animated films of the 1990s
  - List of highest-grossing animated films of the 2000s
  - List of highest-grossing animated films of the 2010s
  - List of highest-grossing animated films of the 2020s
  - List of highest-grossing live-action/animated films
  - List of highest-grossing adult animated films

=== Fastest films grosses ===
- List of fastest-grossing films
  - List of highest-grossing openings for films
  - List of highest-grossing openings for animated films
  - List of highest-grossing second weekends for films

=== Other grosses ===
- List of highest-grossing films based on video games
- List of highest-grossing films based on television series
- List of highest-grossing documentary films
- Highest-grossing concert films
- List of highest-grossing films based on comics
- List of highest-grossing films based on comic strips
- List of highest-grossing biographical films

=== By genre ===
- List of highest-grossing action films
- List of highest-grossing Christmas films
- List of highest-grossing comedy films
- List of highest-grossing fantasy films
- List of highest-grossing horror films
- List of highest-grossing martial arts films
- List of highest-grossing musical films
- List of highest-grossing religious films
- List of highest-grossing science fiction films
- List of highest-grossing sports films
- List of highest-grossing superhero films

=== By person ===
- List of highest-grossing actors
- List of highest-grossing film directors
- List of highest-grossing film producers

== Overall grosses for films of specific nationality ==
- List of highest-grossing Australian films
- List of highest-grossing Bangladeshi films
- List of highest-grossing Canadian films
- List of highest-grossing Chinese films
- List of highest-grossing Greek films
- List of highest-grossing Indian films
  - List of highest-grossing South Indian films
  - List of highest-grossing Hindi films
  - List of highest-grossing Telugu films
  - List of highest-grossing Tamil films
  - List of highest-grossing Malayalam films
  - List of highest-grossing Kannada films
  - List of highest-grossing Marathi films
  - List of highest-grossing Punjabi-language films
  - List of highest-grossing Indian Bengali films
  - List of highest-grossing Indian films in the overseas markets
- List of highest-grossing Iranian films
- List of highest-grossing Japanese films
- List of highest-grossing Mexican films
- List of highest-grossing Nigerian films
- List of highest-grossing Pakistani films
- List of highest-grossing Portuguese films
- List of highest-grossing Russian films

== Regional lists ==
- List of highest-grossing films in Australia
- List of highest-grossing films in Austria
- List of highest-grossing films in Bangladesh
- List of highest-grossing films in China
  - List of highest-grossing films in Hong Kong
- List of highest-grossing films in France
- List of highest-grossing films in Germany
- List of highest-grossing films in India
  - List of highest domestic net collection of Hindi films
  - List of highest-grossing South Indian films
- List of highest-grossing films in Indonesia
- List of highest-grossing films in Italy
- List of highest-grossing films in Japan
  - List of highest-grossing anime films in Japan
- List of highest-grossing films in Malaysia
- List of highest-grossing films in Nepal
- List of highest-grossing films in Pakistan
- List of highest-grossing films in the Philippines
- List of highest-grossing films in Romania
- List of highest-grossing films in Russia
- List of highest-grossing films in Singapore
- List of highest-grossing films in South Korea
- List of highest-grossing films in the Soviet Union
- List of highest-grossing films in Spain
  - List of highest-grossing films in Catalan
- List of highest-grossing films in Taiwan
- List of highest-grossing films in Thailand
- List of highest-grossing films in Turkey
- List of highest-grossing films in the United Kingdom
- List of highest-grossing films in the United States and Canada
  - List of highest-grossing animated films in the United States and Canada
- List of highest-grossing films in Vietnam

== Other ==
- List of films that received the Diamond Film
- List of films that received the Platinum Film
- List of films that received the Golden Film

== See also ==
- List of best-selling films in the United States
- List of biggest box-office bombs
- List of film sequels by box-office performance
- List of films with the most weekends at number one in North America
- List of highest-grossing media franchises
