= Don Lucio y el hermano pío =

- Directed by: José Antonio Nieves Conde
- Written by: Jaime García-Herranz; Pío Ballesteros
- Cinematography: Alfredo Fraile
- Edited by: Margarita de Ochoa
- Music by: Manuel Parada
- Release date: 6 October 1960
- Running time: 83 minutes
- Country: Spain
- Language: Spanish

Don Lucio y el hermano pío ("Don Lucio and the pious brother") is a 1960 Spanish comedy film directed by José Antonio Nieves Conde, starring Tony Leblanc and José Isbert. It tells the story of a swindler who becomes acquainted with a monk during a train ride to Madrid. Leblanc received the Best Actor award from the National Syndicate of Spectacle.

== Cast ==
- Tony Leblanc as Lucio García / Falso Hermano Antón
- José Isbert as Hermano Pío
- Montserrat Salvador as Mari
- Tony Soler as Remedios
- Pedro Porcel as Señor Rivera
- Ana María Custodio as Doña Lola
- Gracita Morales as Gracita
- Lidia San Clemente as Sole
