= One Hundred and One Dalmatians =

1961 Disney animated film

- Theatrical release poster
- Directed by: Wolfgang Reitherman; Hamilton Luske; Clyde Geronimi
- Screenplay by: Bill Peet (uncredited)
- Story by: Bill Peet
- Based on: The Hundred and One Dalmatians by Dodie Smith
- Produced by: Walt Disney
- Starring: Rod Taylor; Cate Bauer; Betty Lou Gerson; Ben Wright; Lisa Davis; Martha Wentworth
- Edited by: Roy M. Brewer, Jr.; Donald Halliday
- Music by: George Bruns
- Animation by: Directing Animators: Milt Kahl; Frank Thomas; Marc Davis; John Lounsbery; Ollie Johnston; Eric Larson
- Production company: Walt Disney Productions
- Distributed by: Buena Vista Distribution
- Release date: January 25, 1961
- Running time: 79 minutes
- Country: United States
- Language: English
- Budget: $3.6–4 million
- Box office: $303 million

One Hundred and One Dalmatians (also known as 101 Dalmatians) is a 1961 American animated adventure comedy film produced by Walt Disney Productions with distribution by Buena Vista Distribution. Adapted from Dodie Smith's 1956 novel The Hundred and One Dalmatians, the film was directed by Hamilton Luske, Clyde Geronimi, and Wolfgang Reitherman in his feature-length directorial debut, from a script by Bill Peet. (Note: Credited for the story, but uncredited for the screenplay.) It features the voice talents of Rod Taylor, J. Pat O'Malley, Betty Lou Gerson, Martha Wentworth, Ben Wright, Cate Bauer, Dave Frankham, and Fred Worlock. The film's plot follows Pongo and Perdita, two London-based Dalmatians who give birth to a litter of fifteen puppies, who are later kidnapped by the obsessive socialite Cruella de Vil, wanting to make their fur into coats. Pongo and Perdita set out on a cross-country rescue mission to save the litter from the maniacal Cruella. They rescue 84 additional Dalmatians in the process, bringing the total to 101.

One Hundred and One Dalmatians was released in theaters on January 25, 1961, to positive reviews from critics and was a box-office success, grossing $14 million domestically in its original theatrical run. It became the first animated feature to earn over $10 million during its initial release, and became the eighth-highest-grossing film of the year in the North American box office and the highest-grossing animated film when reissues of films are not counted. Aside from its box-office revenue, the employment of inexpensive animation techniques, such as using xerography during the process of inking and painting traditional animation cels, kept production costs down. Counting reissues, the film grossed $303 million worldwide, and when adjusted for inflation, is the twelfth-highest-grossing film in the North American box office and the second-highest-grossing animated film globally, as well as being the sixth-highest-selling animated film since 1959 at an estimate of over 199,800,000 sold tickets.

The success of the film made Disney expand it into a media franchise, with a live-action remake released in 1996, followed by a sequel in 2000. A direct-to-video animated sequel to the 1961 film, 101 Dalmatians II: Patch's London Adventure, was released in 2003. Two animated television series based on the franchise were also produced, with 101 Dalmatians: The Series in 1997 and 101 Dalmatian Street in 2019. A live-action prequel with a standalone continuity, Cruella, was released in 2021.

== Plot ==
In 1950s London, aspiring songwriter Roger Radcliffe lives in a bachelor flat with his pet Dalmatian, Pongo. Deciding both of them need a "mate", Pongo watches women and their dogs in the street. Noticing a young woman named Anita and her Dalmatian Perdita, he drags Roger to a park to arrange a meeting. Despite a tumultuous first encounter, Roger and Anita fall in love, and soon marry, with Pongo and Perdita attending.

The Radcliffes hire a nanny and move into a small townhouse near Regent's Park. Perdita becomes pregnant with a litter of 15 puppies; shortly afterward, Anita's entitled, fur-obsessed former schoolmate Cruella de Vil visits the Radcliffes and expresses a keen interest in the puppies. Perdita confides to Pongo she is suspicious of Cruella's motives. When the puppies arrive, Cruella returns and offers to buy them for a large sum. Roger stands up to her and announces firmly that the pups are not for sale; enraged, Cruella swears revenge.

Several weeks later, Cruella makes good on her threat by secretly hiring Jasper and Horace Badun, two burglar brothers, to steal the puppies. The police are unable to find the puppies or prove Cruella was involved, so Pongo and Perdita utilize a nationwide canine gossip line, the "Twilight Bark", to solicit help from all the English dogs.

In Suffolk, Pongo and Perdita's message reaches The Colonel, an Old English Sheepdog on the farm of a retired cavalry officer. After the barn cat Sergeant Tibbs hears puppies barking at the nearby de Vil estate, he and The Colonel investigate. They find the Badun brothers guarding the fifteen stolen puppies, as well as 84 more dalmatians bought and paid for in shops. The Colonel sends word back to London, and Pongo and Perdita travel to Suffolk as fast as they can.

Learning that Cruella intends to make dogskin fur coats from her captives, Tibbs hastily tries to evacuate the puppies. The Baduns intervene, but Pongo and Perdita arrive and hold them off while Tibbs and the Colonel get the puppies to the farm. After hearing of Cruella's schemes, Pongo and Perdita decide to adopt the other 84 puppies to protect them.

The Dalmatians start their homeward trek, pursued by Cruella and the Baduns. They eventually make their way to Dinsford, where they meet a Black Labrador who offers them a ride in a moving van bound for London. Cruella and the Baduns arrive, so Pongo has his whole family roll in a sooty fireplace to disguise themselves as other Labradors. As they board the van, their cover is blown at the last minute, when melting snow washes off some of the soot. Furious at having been tricked, Cruella pursues the van in her car and tries to ram it off the road. The Baduns also attempt a similar maneuver, but their lorry collides with Cruella's car, and both vehicles crash into a ditch. Cruella berates the Baduns and sobs with fury as the van drives away.

In London, a miserable Nanny and the Radcliffes try to enjoy Christmas. It is revealed that they have acquired huge wealth from a song that Roger had written about Cruella, which has become a big radio hit; but they are missing their canine companions too much to enjoy this much. The Dalmatians suddenly flood the house, reuniting with their owners. Upon counting the massive family of dogs, Roger suggests they use his songwriting royalties to buy a big house in the country, so that they can keep all 101 Dalmatians.

== Voice cast ==
- Rod Taylor as Pongo, Roger's urbane and dashing pet Dalmatian, Perdita's mate, the father of fifteen, and adoptive father of the eighty-four orphaned puppies. He also serves as the film's narrator.
- Cate Bauer and Lisa Daniels as Perdita, Anita's quiet and refined pet Dalmatian, Pongo's mate, the mother of fifteen, and adopted mother of the eighty-four orphaned puppies. She is an amalgamation of the characters "Perdita" and "Missis" from the original novel.
- J. Pat O'Malley and Fred Worlock as Jasper and Horace Badun, mean and argumentative small-time crooks whom Cruella hires to steal Dalmatian puppies.
  - O'Malley also voiced Colonel, an Old English Sheepdog of military bearing who aids in the search for puppies; Mr. Simpkins, a panelist on What's My Crime? TV show; and the Mechanic.
  - Worlock also voiced Inspector Graves, a panelist on What's My Crime? TV show.
- Betty Lou Gerson as Cruella de Vil, an erratic and ruthless aristocrat and Anita's former schoolmate who adores fur and wants to turn Dalmatian puppies into a coat.
  - Gerson also voiced Miss Birdwell, a panelist on What's My Crime? TV show.
- Martha Wentworth as Nanny, the Radcliffes' warm and motherly cook and housekeeper. She is an amalgamation of the characters "Nanny Cook" and "Nanny Butler" from the original novel.
  - Wentworth also voiced Lucy, the white goose; and Queenie, one of the cows that the Dalmatians encounter during their escape from Cruella.
- Ben Wright as Roger Radcliffe, Pongo's absent-minded owner and Anita's husband who works as a songwriter.
  - Bill Lee provided Roger's singing voice.
- Lisa Davis as Anita Radcliffe, Perdita's reserved and polite owner, Roger's wife, and Cruella's former schoolmate.
- Dave Frankham as Sergeant Tibbs, a scrawny tabby cat who aids the puppies in their escape from Cruella and Baduns.
  - Frankham also voiced Scottie, the Skye Terrier.
- Tom Conway as an unnamed Collie who offers Dalmatians shelter for the night during their trek.
  - Conway also voiced the Quizmaster, a loquacious moderator of What's My Crime? TV show.
- Tudor Owen as Old Towser, a Bloodhound.
  - Owen also voiced the Truck Driver.
- George Pelling as Danny, a large Great Dane who was born in Hampstead.
- Ramsay Hill as an unnamed Labrador Retriever that helps Pongo and the Dalmatians escape from Cruella and Baduns.
  - Hill also voiced the TV Announcer.
- Queenie Leonard and Marjorie Bennett as Princess and Duchess, cows from a country barn where Dalmatians take shelter during their escape.
  - Sylvia Marriott voiced the fourth unnamed cow.

Additionally, the film features Mickey Maga, Barbara Beaird, Mimi Gibson, and Sandra Abbott as Patch, Rolly, Lucky, and Penny, Dalmatian puppies from Pongo and Perdita's litter. Max Smith, Bob Stevens, Clarence Nash, and Dal McKennon provided the sounds of dog barks. Thurl Ravenscroft voiced Captain, a gray horse and aide of Colonel and Sergeant Tibbs. Barbara Luddy (who voiced characters in previous films such as Lady and the Tramp and Sleeping Beauty) and Rickie Sorensen voiced Rover and Spotty, two of the eighty-four Dalmatian puppies that were bought by Cruella. Jeanne Gayle (the wife of the film's composer George Bruns) performed the radio version of "Cruella De Vil" song in the film's final scene. Paul Frees voiced Dirty Dawson, the villain in the Thunderbolt TV show. Lucille Bliss performed the "Kanine Krunchies" jingle in a TV commercial.

== Production ==
=== Story development ===
The children's novel The Hundred and One Dalmatians by Dodie Smith had been published on November 19, 1956, to an immediate success. By February 1957, screenwriter Charles Brackett brought it to the attention of Walt Disney, who acquired the film rights to the novel on November 26 of that year (after lengthy negotiations) for $25,000. The project was set to be Disney's next animated feature after Sleeping Beauty (which was still in production at the time) and was originally expected to be finished within two years. Story artist Bill Peet was assigned to single-handedly develop the story, marking the first time a Disney animated film was written by one person. Disney also tasked Peet to write a detailed screenplay first before storyboarding; since Peet never learned to use a typewriter, he wrote the initial draft by hand on legal paper. The manuscript was completed and typed up within two months, after which, having received Disney's approval, Peet began storyboarding and was charged with recording the voice-over process. This was the first time that a complete screenplay was approved for a Disney feature animated film before storyboarding began, but it was "a short-lived experiment" and that particular approach would not be used again at Disney Animation until The Great Mouse Detective (1986).

Peet closely followed the plot of Smith's novel, but condensed some of its characters, which included Cruella's husband and cat, as well as Cadpig, the female runt of Pongo and Missis' puppies, whose traits were transferred to Lucky in the final film. (Note: The Disney version of Cadpig was introduced as one of the main characters in 1997 animated TV series.) He also merged two Dalmatian mothers, birth mother Missis and adopted mother Perdita, into one, naming her after the latter; likewise, Nanny Cook and Nanny Butler from the novel were amalgamated into one character, simply named Nanny. The Colonel's cat assistant was re-gendered from the female Pussy Willow into the male Sergeant Tibbs, and Horace Badun was renamed from Saul. Among other things, Peet retained a scene from the original book in which Pongo and Perdita exchange wedding vows in unison with their owners, who were also renamed from Mr. and Mrs. Dearly to Roger and Anita Radcliffe. However, after the censor board warned that it might offend certain religious audiences if the animals repeated the exact words of a solemn religious ceremony, it was reworked to be less religious, down to having Roger and Anita dressed in formal clothes. Originally, the film ended with the newly rich Roger selling his song about Cruella and buying the Hell Hall to turn it into a Dalmatian Plantation, with Pongo and Perdita expecting another litter of puppies. It was ultimately cut short and rewritten to have Dalmatians reunite with their owners after they escape from Cruella.

Although Disney had not been as involved in the production of the animated films as frequently as in previous years, he was always present at story meetings. When Peet sent Dodie Smith some drawings of the characters, she wrote back saying that he had improved her story and that the designs looked better than the illustrations in the book.

=== Casting ===
The filmmakers deliberately cast actors with deeper voices for the roles of dogs, so they would have more power than those of the human characters. Rod Taylor, who had extensive radio experience, was one of the first actors cast in the film; he got the role of Pongo. Lisa Daniels was originally cast as Perdita and recorded about a third of her lines, but then got married and moved to New York; Cate Bauer replaced her for the rest of the film. J. Pat O'Malley, who was a regular voice actor for the studio and one of Disney's personal favorites, got the roles of Jasper and Colonel, and also voiced several minor characters in the film. David Frankham was cast as Sergeant Tibbs in the spring of 1959 and finished his recording within three sessions from May 1959 to January 1960; he was also asked to record the part of Scottie, the Skye Terrier who appears early in the "Twilight Bark" sequence.

Disney originally had Lisa Davis read for the role of Cruella De Vil, but she did not think that she was right for the part, and wanted to try reading the role of Anita instead. Disney agreed, and, after they read the script for a second time, she landed the part. Davis also provided live-action reference for the character. Betty Lou Gerson, who was previously the narrator for Cinderella (1950), auditioned for the role of Cruella De Vil in front of Marc Davis, the character's supervising animator, and sequence director Wolfgang Reitherman, and immediately landed it. While searching for the right accent of the character, she landed on a "phony theatrical voice, someone who's set sail from New York but hasn't quite reached England." During the recording process, Gerson was thought to be imitating Tallulah Bankhead, but she later disputed that she "didn't intentionally imitate her ... We both had phony English accents on top of our Southern accents and a great deal of flair. So our voices came out that way." Gerson finished her recording sessions in fourteen days.

=== Animation ===
==== Art direction ====
After Sleeping Beauty (1959) disappointed at the box office, Disney was losing money and there were discussions about closing down the animation department. During the film's production, Disney told animator Eric Larson: "I don't think we can continue; it's too expensive." Despite this, he still had deep feelings towards animation because he had built the company upon it.

Ub Iwerks, in charge of special processes at the studio, had been experimenting with Xerox photography to aid in animation. By 1959, he used a Xerox camera to transfer drawings by animators directly to animation cels, eliminating the inking process, thus saving time and money while preserving the spontaneity of the penciled elements. However, because of its limitations, the camera was unable to deviate from a black scratchy outline and lacked the fine lavish quality of hand inking. Disney would first use the Xerox process for a thorn forest in Sleeping Beauty, and the first production to make full use of the process was Goliath II (1960). For One Hundred and One Dalmatians, one of the benefits of the process was that it was a great help towards animating the spotted dogs. According to Chuck Jones, Disney was able to complete the film for about half of what it would have cost if they had had to animate all the dogs and spots.

Meanwhile, Ken Anderson, the studio's art director, learned a television production studio—Hurrell Productions—was using Xerography to produce television commercials featuring Disney characters. Inspired by the aesthetic, Anderson experimented with a Xerox copier to directly transfer the animators' drawings onto transparent cels, thereby eliminating the inking process. Anderson screened an animation test to Disney and the animators; although Disney expressed concern at the graphic style, he gave his approval stating: "Ah, yeah, yeah, you can fool around all you want to." For the stylized art direction, Anderson took inspiration from British cartoonist Ronald Searle, who once advised him to use a Mont Blanc pen and India ink for his artwork.

In addition to the character animation, Anderson also sought to use Xerography on "the background painting because I was going to apply the same technique to the whole picture." Along with color stylist Walt Peregoy, the two had the line drawings be printed on a separate animation cel before being laid over the background, which gave the appearance similar to the Xeroxed animation. Disney disliked the artistic look of the film and felt he was losing the "fantasy" element of his animated films. In a meeting with the animation staff concerning future films, Disney angrily said, "We're never gonna have one of those goddamned things", referring to the film's art direction; he also stated, "Ken's never going to be an art director again."

Anderson took this to heart, but Disney eventually forgave him on his final trip to the studio in late 1966. As Anderson recalled in an interview:

He looked very sick. I said, "Gee, it's great to see you, Walt," and he said, "You know that thing you did on Dalmatians." He didn't say anything else, but he just gave me this look, and I knew that all was forgiven and in his opinion, maybe what I did on Dalmatians wasn't so bad. That was the last time I ever saw him. Then, a few weeks later, I learned he was gone.

==== Character animation ====
Marc Davis was the sole animator on Cruella De Vil. During production, Davis said her character was partly inspired by Bette Davis (no relation), Rosalind Russell, and Tallulah Bankhead. He took further influence from her voice actress, Betty Lou Gerson, whose cheekbones he added to the character. He later complimented, "[t]hat [her] voice was the greatest thing I've ever had a chance to work with. A voice like Betty Lou's gives you something to do. You get a performance going there, and if you don't take advantage of it, you're off your rocker". While her hair coloring originated from the illustrations in the novel, Davis found its disheveled style by looking "through old magazines for hairdos from 1940 till now". Her coat was exaggerated to match her oversized personality, and the lining was red because "there's a devil image involved".

As with the previous Disney films, the actors provided live-action reference as an aid to the animators before the animation process begun. By January 1959, Mary Wickes, who had played the maid Katie in The Mickey Mouse Club serial Annette, was hired as a model for Cruella De Vil. The live-action reference for Nanny was provided by both Don Barclay and Barbara Luddy, who had voiced Lady in Lady and the Tramp (1955) and Merryweather in Sleeping Beauty (1959). Helene Stanley – who had been a model for the titular character in Cinderella (1950) and Princess Aurora in Sleeping Beauty (1959) – performed the live-action reference for Anita.

=== Music ===
One Hundred and One Dalmatians was the first Disney animated feature film to be a non-musical. To have music involved in the narrative, Peet used an old theater trick by which the protagonist is a down-and-out songwriter. However, unlike the previous animated Disney films at the time, the songs were not composed by a team, but by Mel Leven who composed both lyrics and music. Previously, Leven had composed songs for the UPA animation studio in which animators, who transferred to work at the Disney studios, had recommended him to Walt Disney. His first assignment was to compose "Cruella De Vil," of which Leven composed three versions. The final version used in the film was composed as a "bluesy number" just before a meeting with Walt.

The other two songs included in the film are "Kanine Krunchies Jingle" (sung by Lucille Bliss, who voiced Anastasia Tremaine in Disney's 1950 film Cinderella), and "Dalmatian Plantation" in which Roger sings only two lines at its closure. Leven had also written additional songs that were not included in the film. The first song, "Don't Buy a Parrot from a Sailor," a cockney chant, was meant to be sung by Jasper and Horace at the De Vil Mansion. A second song, "Cheerio, Good-Bye, Toodle-oo, Hip Hip!" was to be sung by the dalmatian puppies as they make their way into London. A third song titled "March of the One Hundred and One" was meant for the dogs to sing after escaping Cruella by van. Different, longer versions of "Kanine Krunchies Jingle" and "Dalmatian Plantation" appear on the Disneyland Records read-along album based on the film.

The Sherman Brothers wrote a title song, "One Hundred and One Dalmatians", but it was not used in the film. The song has been released on other Disney recordings, however.

== Release ==
=== Original theatrical run ===
One Hundred and One Dalmatians premiered and was released in theaters on January 25, 1961, accompanied by the documentary The Horse with the Flying Tail (1960). To promote the film, an updated version of the 1957 Disneyland episode "The Best Doggoned Dog in the World" was aired on ABC on February 12, 1961, featuring the footage from One Hundred and One Dalmatians instead of scenes from Old Yeller (1957).

During its initial theatrical run, the film grossed $14 million in the United States and Canada, which generated $6.2 million in distributor rentals. It was the first animated feature to earn more than $10 million on its initial release, as well as the most popular film of the year in France, with admissions of 14.7 million ranking tenth on their all-time list. The box-office success of One Hundred and One Dalmatians pulled the studio's animation department out of the financial slump caused by the underperformance of Sleeping Beauty two years prior; despite this, it did nothing to rekindle Disney's fading interest in animation, with him being more focused on working on Disneyland and producing live-action films by then.

=== Re-releases ===
One Hundred and One Dalmatians was re-released theatrically in the United States in 1969, 1979, 1985, and 1991. During its first re-release in 1969, it earned $15 million. In 1979, it grossed $19 million while playing on a double bill with another Disney film The Last Flight of Noah's Ark, and in its 1985 theatrical re-release, the film earned $32 million. During its fourth re-release in 1991, it grossed $60.8 million, becoming the 17th highest-grossing film of the year in the United States. In 1980, the film earned rentals of $8 million in France, Belgium and Switzerland. By 1995, the film had grossed $86 million internationally, and in the same year it grossed $71 million overseas, bringing its international total to $157 million. The film's total domestic lifetime gross is $145 million, and its total worldwide gross is $303 million. Adjusted for inflation, and incorporating subsequent releases, the film has a lifetime gross of $936.2 million. To celebrate Disney's 100th anniversary, One Hundred and One Dalmatians was re-released in theaters across the UK on September 8, 2023, for a week.

=== Home media ===
One Hundred and One Dalmatians was first released on VHS on April 10, 1992, as part of the Walt Disney Classics video series; 11.1 million copies had been sold by June of that year. At the time of its release, it was the sixth best-selling video of all time. The film was re-released on VHS and LaserDisc on March 9, 1999, as part of the Walt Disney Masterpiece Collection for a limited 101-day time period. The VHS version was THX-certified and featured a 90-second animated short. The DVD edition was originally scheduled for release in the spring of that year, but was delayed until November 11; it was released as a Walt Disney Limited Issue for a limited 60-day time period before going into moratorium.

By 2007, One Hundred and One Dalmatians underwent a digital restoration and was released as a two-disc Platinum Edition DVD on March 4, 2008. The set included a behind-the-scenes documentary Redefining the Line: The Making of One Hundred and One Dalmatians, two additional featurettes – Cruella de Vil: Drawn to Be Bad (dedicated to the talents behind the creation of the eponymous character) and Sincerely Yours, Walt Disney (covering Disney's correspondence with Dodie Smith), deleted songs, a virtual gallery of concept art and other production photos, theatrical trailers, radio and TV spots. It returned to the Disney Vault on January 30, 2010.

One Hundred and One Dalmatians was released for the first time on Blu-ray in the United Kingdom on September 3, 2012. In North America, it was released on Diamond Edition Blu-ray and Digital HD on February 10, 2015, featuring a new making-of featurette Lucky Dogs, the animated short The Further Adventures of Thunderbolt (based on the Thunderbolt TV show in the film), a 1961 version of the Disneyland episode "The Best Doggoned Dog in the World", and several bonus features from the previous DVD release. The set was re-released as a limited Blu-ray/DVD combo pack for the Disney Movie Club on November 6, 2018. On September 24, 2019, One Hundred and One Dalmatians was re-released for HD digital download and on Blu-ray as part of the Walt Disney Signature Collection.

== Reception ==
=== Critical response ===
In its initial release, One Hundred and One Dalmatians received acclaim from critics, many of whom hailed it as the studio's best release since Snow White and the Seven Dwarfs (1937) and the closest to a real "Disney" film in many years. Howard Thompson of The New York Times wrote, "While the story moves steadily toward a stark, melodramatic "chase" climax, it remains enclosed in a typical Disney frame of warm family love, human and canine." However, he later opined that the "[s]ongs are scarce, too. A few more would have braced the final starkness." Variety claimed that "While not as indelibly enchanting or inspired as some of the studio's most unforgettable animated endeavors, this is nonetheless a painstaking creative effort." A review in Time magazine praised the film as "the wittiest, most charming, least pretentious cartoon feature Walt Disney has ever made." Harrison's Reports felt all children and adults will be "highly entertained by Walt Disney's latest, a semi-sophisticated, laugh-provoking, all cartoon, feature-lengther in Technicolor." Dodie Smith also enjoyed the film where she particularly praised the animation and backgrounds of the film. Phil Thomas of Empire Magazine gave the film 5 stars out of 5, and said "One of Disney's finest, most underrated moments."

Contemporary reviews have remained positive. Reviewing the film during its 1991 re-release, Roger Ebert of the Chicago Sun-Times, while giving the film three stars out of four, asserted that "it's an uneven film, with moments of inspiration in a fairly conventional tale of kidnapping and rescue. This is not one of the great Disney classics - it's not in the same league with Snow White or Pinocchio - but it's passable fun, and will entertain its target family audiences." Chicago Tribune film critic Gene Siskel, in his 1991 review, also gave the film three stars out of four. Ralph Novak of People magazine wrote: "What it lacks in romantic extravagance and plush spectacle, this 1961 Disney film makes up for in quiet charm and subtlety. In fact, if any movie with dogs, cats, and horses who talk can be said to belong in the realm of realistic drama, this is it." However, in 2011, Craig Berman, in an MSNBC article, ranked the film and its 1996 remake as two of the worst children's films of all time, writing, "The plot itself is a bit nutty. Making a coat out of dogs? Who does that? But worse than Cruella de Vil's fashion sense is the fact that your children will definitely start asking for a Dalmatian of their own for their next birthday."

On the review aggregator website Rotten Tomatoes, the film holds an approval rating of 98% based on 54 reviews, with an average score of 8.3/10. The website's critics consensus reads, "With plenty of pooches and a memorable villain (Cruella De Vil), this is one of Disney's most enduring, entertaining animated films." Metacritic, which uses a weighted average, assigned the film a score of 83 out of 100, based on 10 critics, indicating "universal acclaim".

Cruella De Vil ranked 39th on AFI's list of "100 Years...100 Heroes and Villains".

== Legacy ==
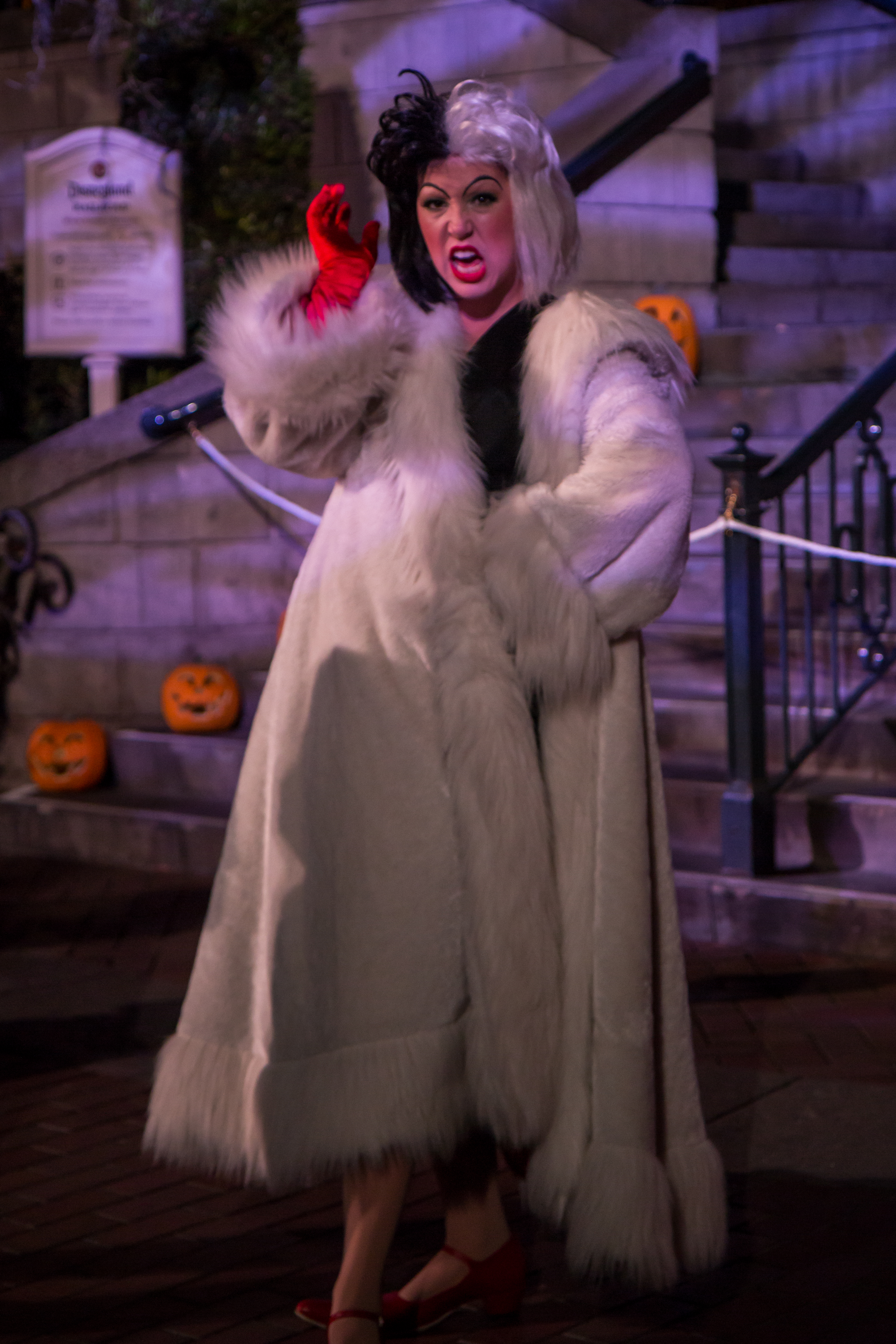
Cruella De Vil regularly appears as a meetable character at the Disney Parks.

Since the original release of One Hundred and One Dalmatians in 1961, Disney has taken the property in various directions.

=== Television series ===
In 1996, it was announced that an animated television series based on the film would be created through a partnership between Disney and Kellogg's. Co-produced by Walt Disney Television Animation and Jumbo Pictures, 101 Dalmatians: The Series aired in syndication and on ABC from 1997 to 1998.

101 Dalmatian Street is the second TV series with a plot in the 21st century, with a new art style and a concept loosely based on the source material. Set 60 years after the original film, the show mostly focuses on a completely new family of Dalmatians, (who are descendants of Pongo and Perdita) who all live without a human in Camden Town.

=== Sequel ===
A direct-to-video sequel to the original animated film, 101 Dalmatians II: Patch's London Adventure, was released in 2003. The main focus of the sequel is Patch, the loneliest of puppies, feeling "lost in a sea of spots". After he gets left behind during the Radcliffe's moving day, he encounters his TV hero, Thunderbolt, who enlists him on a publicity campaign.

=== Live-action adaptations ===
A live-action remake of the 1961 film, 101 Dalmatians, was released in 1996; unlike the animated film, none of the animals had speaking voices in this version. It was followed by a sequel, 102 Dalmatians, in 2000. A live-action version of Cruella De Vil is featured as one of the main antagonists in the fourth season of the fantasy television series, Once Upon a Time (produced by Disney-owned ABC Studios). Cruella is one of the four main villains in the 2015 television film Descendants, which follows the teenage children of Disney's iconic heroes and villains (including Cruella's son, Carlos). A 2021 live-action prequel to the 1996 film Cruella, focuses on the origin of the eponymous character. A sequel to this film is currently in development.

=== Stage musical ===
Disney's 101 Dalmatians KIDS, a 30-minute musical adaptation of the film intended for elementary-school-aged performers, is available for licensing through Music Theatre International. The film was adapted by Marcy Heisler and Bryan Louiselle.

=== Other media ===
The characters from One Hundred and One Dalmatians make cameo appearances in the television series House of Mouse, with Cruella De Vil featured as one of the main villains in the stand-alone feature Mickey's House of Villains (2002). Like other Walt Disney Animation Studios characters, the film's characters have cameo appearances in the short film Once Upon a Studio (2023).

In the first Kingdom Hearts game, a side quest consists of Sora tracking down the 99 puppies whose world has been destroyed and returning them to Pongo and Perdita, who have been given shelter in Traverse Town by Squall Leonhart.

== See also ==
- List of highest-grossing animated films
- List of highest-grossing films in France
- List of American films of 1961
- List of animated feature films of the 1960s
- List of Walt Disney Pictures films
- List of Disney theatrical animated feature films
- Second weekend in box office performance § Second-weekend increase

== Bibliography ==
- Allan, Robin (1999). Walt Disney and Europe: European Influence on the Animated Feature Films of Walt Disney. John Libbey & Co. ISBN 978-1-8646-2041-2.
- Barrier, Michael (1999). Hollywood Cartoons: American Animation in Its Golden Age. Oxford University Press. ISBN 978-0-1980-2079-0.
- Barrier, Michael (2007). The Animated Man: A Life of Walt Disney. University of California Press. ISBN 978-0-5202-5619-4.
- Beck, Jerry (2005). The Animated Movie Guide. Chicago Review Press. ISBN 978-1-5565-2591-9.
- Canemaker, John (1996). Before the Animation Begins: The Art and Lives of Disney Inspirational Sketch Artists. Hyperion Books. ISBN 978-0-786-86152-1.
- Canemaker, John (2001). Walt Disney's Nine Old Men and the Art of Animation. Disney Editions. ISBN 978-0-786-86496-6.
- Dakin, Glenn; Saxon, Victoria (2020). Disney Villains The Essential Guide New Edition. DK Publishing. ISBN 978-0-7440-3483-7.
- Finch, Christopher (1975) [1973]. "Chapter 10: Limited Animation". The Art of Walt Disney: From Mickey Mouse to the Magic Kingdom. Harry N. Abrams. ISBN 978-0-810-99007-4.
- Frankham, David; Hollifield, Jim (2015). Which One Was David?. BearManor Media. ISBN 978-1-5939-3218-3.
- Gabler, Neal (2006). Walt Disney: The Triumph of the American Imagination. Vintage Books. ISBN 978-0-6797-5747-4.
- Ghez, Didier (2019). They Drew as They Pleased Vol. 5: The Hidden Art of Disney's Early Renaissance. Chronicle Books. ISBN 978-1-797-20410-9.
- Grove, Valerie (1996). Dear Dodie: The Life of Dodie Smith. Chatto & Windus. ISBN 978-0-7011-5753-1.
- Hollis, Tim; Ehrbar, Greg (2023). Mouse Tracks: The Story of Walt Disney Records. University Press of Mississippi. ISBN 978-1-4968-5127-7.
- Koenig, David (1997). Mouse Under Glass: Secrets of Disney Animation & Theme Parks. Bonaventure Press. ISBN 978-0-9640-6051-7.
- Maltin, Leonard (1995). The Disney Films. Disney Editions. ISBN 978-0-7868-8527-5.
- Peet, Bill (1989). Bill Peet: An Autobiography. Houghton Mifflin Harcourt. ISBN 978-0-3956-8982-0.
- Peri, Don; Docter, Pete (2024). Directing at Disney: The Original Directors of Walt's Animated Films. Los Angeles: Disney Editions. p. 195. ISBN 9781484755747.
- Smith, Dave (2012). Disney Trivia from the Vault: Secrets Revealed and Questions Answered. Disney Editions. ISBN 978-1-4231-7857-6.
- Scott, Keith (2022). Cartoon Voices of the Golden Age, 1930-70 Vol. 1. BearManor Media. ISBN 979-8-8877-1008-2.
- Thomas, Bob (1997). Disney's Art of Animation: From Mickey Mouse To Hercules. Disney Editions. ISBN 978-0-7868-6241-2.
- Thomas, Frank; Johnston, Ollie (1981). Disney Animation: The Illusion of Life. Abbeville Press. ISBN 978-0-7868-6070-8.
- Thomas, Frank; Johnston, Ollie (1993). The Disney Villain. Disney Editions. ISBN 978-1-5628-2792-2.
- Vagg, Stephen (2010). Rod Taylor: An Aussie in Hollywood. BearManorMedia. ISBN 978-1-5939-3511-5.
- Webb, Graham (2011). The Animated Film Encyclopedia: A Complete Guide to American Shorts, Features and Sequences, 1900-1999. McFarland & Company. ISBN 978-0-7864-4985-9.
