= Km. 0 =

- Directed by: Yolanda García Serrano; Juan Luis Iborra
- Written by: Yolanda García Serrano; Juan Luis Iborra
- Starring: Concha Velasco; Georges Corraface; Silke; Carlos Fuentes; Mercè Pons; Alberto San Juan; Elisa Matilla; Armando del Río; Miquel García Borda; Jesús Cabrero; Víctor Ullate Jr. Cora Tiedra
- Cinematography: Ángel Luis Fernández
- Edited by: José Salcedo
- Music by: Joan Bibiloni
- Release date: 2000
- Running time: 108 minutes (theatrical); 100 minutes (US DVD)
- Country: Spain
- Language: Spanish

Km. 0 is a 2000 film Spanish directed by Yolanda García Serrano and Juan Luis Iborra. The plot concerns about several intertwining stories of mistaken identity and coincidental meetings (that may not be coincidental) that take place near the Kilometre Zero marker in the Puerta del Sol in Madrid.

== Plot ==
Pedro arranges to meet Silvia at Kilometre Zero to stay with her in Madrid, but ends up mistaking Tatiana for her. Tatiana was there to meet new client Sergio, who ends up meeting Maximo instead. Maximo was there to meet Bruno, whom he'd met cruising on the internet. Bruno ends up meeting Benjamin, who's had to leave his apartment so that Miguel can meet his client, Marga. Silvia sees Gerard in his car and throws herself in front of it to catch his attention. Meanwhile, Amor walks Mario to work at the bar and goes shopping for a watch for him and for a fitting of her wedding dress.

Tatiana takes Pedro to her apartment, which is filthy. She gives him a blow job and, when she realizes he's not her client, breaks down crying. Struck by her emotion, he begins framing her as if through a camera's viewfinder. To calm herself, Tatiana takes a sleeping pill, and when she awakens, Pedro is cleaning her apartment. He persuades her to believe in her own worth, buying her a new outfit (which she compares to Pretty Woman) and convincing her that she can charge 50,000 pesetas instead of 5,000 as she had been.

Miguel takes Marga to his apartment for their appointment. Afterwards, she sees a wallet and finds a photograph inside. She has the same photo in her wallet; it's the only picture she has of herself and her son, whom she'd abandoned some 25 years before. Horrified, she leaves and ends up at Mario's bar.

Benjamin takes Bruno back to the apartment as well. After they spend some time together, Bruno realizes that Benjamin has lied about being his computer date. He plans to leave, but they each confess that they've fallen in love with each other. Benjamin runs to the bar to buy a bottle of champagne. There, Marga sees that it's Benjamin's wallet that she'd seen earlier and that Benjamin, not Miguel, is her son.

Gerard takes Silvia into the bar to tend to her "injuries" and she works to convince him to cast her in his new musical. She alternately recites from Romeo and Juliet and threatens to make trouble for him because of the "accident." Gerard mocks her for reciting Shakespeare to audition for a musical and threatens her back, physically. As he begins to stalk out, Silvia sings Maybe This Time from Cabaret. Gerard finds her performance revelatory.

Maximo and Sergio also end up at the bar, where Maximo teases and flirts outrageously with the sexually repressed Sergio, including fondling his leg under the table. Sergio ends up in the restroom with an erection and, after Maximo gives him a neckrub, he has a spontaneous orgasm. Maximo reassures Sergio that it doesn't mean he's gay, just horny.

Amor gets robbed three times in the same day, including being dragged in the street when a man in a car snatches her purse. She reports the crimes to "Policia" (the character is not otherwise named), and as she gets up to leave, he sees that her skirt is badly torn. As he fixes it with a stapler, she notices his watch. He explains that it was a gift from his only girlfriend, who he'd met when he was twelve and whose name he never learned. Amor tells him that her name was "Amor," that she was that girl. The two have been in love ever since without knowing who the other is. They end up at the bar, where "Policia" tells Mario that he and Amor are going to marry.

The newly sophisticated-looking Tatiana enters the bar, but her nerve fails her. As she dashes out, Pedro catches her and again builds her confidence. They re-enter the bar and Maximo, calling himself Sergio's "guardian angel," arranges for Sergio to go with Tatiana. Tatiana confides in Pedro that she only asked for 40,000 pesetas instead of 50,000 and says she needs more lessons from him. They agree to live together for the three months he'll be in Madrid. Tatiana and Sergio prepare to leave; Sergio wants to say goodbye to Maximo, but Maximo has vanished. He appears sitting on a roof ledge overlooking Benjamin and Bruno as Bruno dances for Benjamin, suggesting that Maximo is their "guardian angel" as well. Miguel finds Marga at the bar and, relieved that she hasn't committed incest, Marga arranges to spend a week or longer with him. Marga also gives Mario the 2,000,000 pesetas that he needs to open his photo store. Mario discovers the birthday present, a watch, that Roma slipped into his pocket several hours earlier. He kisses her, somewhat hesitantly, and she tells him that she'll wait for him.

== Cast ==
- Mercè Pons as Silvia - a 35-year-old struggling actress
- Carlos Fuentes as Pedro - a young aspiring film director whose sister is a friend of Silvia's
- Elisa Matilla as Tatiana - an insecure prostitute
- Alberto San Juan as Sergio - a young businessman
- Silke as Amor - a young woman engaged to Mario
- Tristán Ulloa as Mario - the bartender at a bar near the Kilometre Zero who dreams of opening a photography shop
- Jesús Cabrero as Miguel - a gigolo
- Concha Velasco as Marga - a bored older wife left in Madrid by her husband during business meetings
- Miquel García Borda as Benjamin - a student and Miguel's gay roommate
- Víctor Ullate, Jr. as Bruno - a gay flamenco dancer
- Cora Tiedra as Roma - Amor's sister, who has a crush on Mario
- Georges Corraface as Gerardo - an established director casting for a musical
- Roberto Álamo as a police officer
- Armando del Río as Maximo - another gay man

== Awards and nominations ==
- Boulder Gay & Lesbian Film Festival Audience Award for Best Feature Film (2002)
- Goya Awards Best Original Song - nominated (2001)
- Hamburg Lesbian and Gay Film Festival Eurola Award (2001)
- Outfest Audience Award for Outstanding Narrative Feature (2002)
- Miami Gay and Lesbian Film Festival Audience Award (2001)
- Philadelphia International Gay & Lesbian Film Festival Audience Award Best Feature (2001)

== Home media ==
It was released on Region 1 DVD on February 17, 2004, and Region 2 on July 1, 2006.
