= Caresses =

- Directed by: Ventura Pons
- Written by: Ventura Pons; Sergi Belbel
- Produced by: Ventura Pons
- Starring: David Selvas; Rosa Maria Sardà; Laura Conejero; Julieta Serrano; Agustín González; Sergi López; Mercè Pons; Naím Thomas; Jordi Dauder
- Music by: Carles Cases
- Production company: Els Films de la Rambla, S.A.
- Release date: 13 February 1998
- Running time: 94 minutes
- Country: Spain
- Language: Catalan

Caresses is a 1998 Spanish drama film by Ventura Pons, originally titled Carícies in Catalan.

== Plot ==
Barcelona is the scenario for eleven entwined stories sharing the same characters. The movie deals with a variety of intimate relationships, portraying characters who have to experience intense emotions which cannot be materialised in caresses. Connections explored include several different family and romantic relationships across different genders, ages and generations.

A recurring theme is the irony of how difficult communication can be, even when there is close contact. Partial expression, instincts vs. emotions and physical communication all play a part.

== Cast ==
- David Selvas as Home jove
- Laura Conejero as Dona jove
- Julieta Serrano as Dona gran
- Montserrat Salvador as Dona vella
- Agustín González as Home vell
- Naím Thomas (billed as Naïm Thomàs) as Nen
- Sergi López as Home
- Mercè Pons as Noia
- Jordi Dauder as Home gran
- Roger Coma as Noi
- Rosa Maria Sardà as Dona

Other cast members; Jordi Cercós, Sandra Pascual and Guillermo Pardevila
