= Rosa Vergés =

Spanish director and screenwriter

- Born: 22 February 1955 (age 70); Barcelona, Spain
- Occupation(s): Filmmaker screenwriter

Rosa Vergés Coma (born 22 February 1955) is a Spanish film and television director and screenwriter.

== Life and career ==
Born in Barcelona, the daughter of publisher José Vergés Matas and actress Silvia Morgan, Vergés studied art history at the University of Barcelona and at University of Paris. After brief experiences as a model and a stage actress, she started her career as a scriptwriter and an assistant director, collaborating among others with Bigas Luna and Vicente Aranda. Before her feature film debut, she directed shorts, commercials and corporate videos.

Vergés made her film debut in 1990 with Baby Boom, which premiered in the Critic's Week section of the 47th Venice International Film Festival and got her the Goya for Best New Director. Her following film Souvenir, a comedy about the interracial romance between a Japanese man and a Spanish woman, was a commercial success.

== Selected filmography ==
- Boom boom (1990)
- Souvenir (1994)
- Tic Tac (1997)
- Iris (2004)
