= Fifth District =

1958 film

- Directed by: Julio Coll
- Written by: Julio Coll
- Starring: Alberto Closas; Arturo Fernández
- Release date: 6 April 1958
- Running time: 94 minutes
- Country: Spain
- Language: Spanish

Fifth District (Spanish: Distrito Quinto) is a 1958 Spanish crime film from the "Barcelona film noir period" of their director, Julio Coll and is considered a national classic of the genre.

== Accolades ==
The film received various nominations at the Premios del CEC a la producción española in 1958, including four wins.

== Themes ==
"In these instances, the idea of a corrupting city was very much in tune with ideologies of early Francoism that defended rural values.", commented the Historical Dictionary of Spanish Cinema.
