= Peraustrínia 2004 =

- Theatrical poster for Peraustrínia 2004
- Written by: Joan Marimón
- Starring: Josep Linuesa; Blanca Pàmpols; Ferran Casanoves; Manel Villanova; Antoni Alemany; Raul Macarini
- Cinematography: Neus Górriz
- Edited by: María José Gilabert
- Release date: 6 April 1990
- Running time: 75 min
- Country: Spain
- Language: Catalan

Peraustrínia 2004 is a Spanish animation movie. It is the first animated full-length feature to have been recorded entirely in Catalan. It was directed by Ángel García and written by Joan Marimón.
