= Actrius =

Actresses
- Catalan language film poster
- (Catalan: Actrius)
- Directed by: Ventura Pons
- Written by: Josep Maria Benet i Jornet
- Screenplay by: Ventura Pons
- Based on: (stage play) E.R. by Josep Maria Benet i Jornet
- Produced by: Ventura Pons
- Starring: Núria Espert; Rosa Maria Sardà; Anna Lizaran; Mercè Pons
- Cinematography: Tomàs Pladevall
- Edited by: Pere Abadal
- Music by: Carles Cases
- Production companies: Canal+ España; Els Films de la Rambla S.A.; Generalitat de Catalunya - Departament de Cultura; Televisión Española
- Distributed by: Buena Vista International
- Release date: 17 January 1997 (Spain)
- Running time: 100 minutes
- Country: Spain
- Language: Catalan

Actresses (Catalan: Actrius) is a 1997 Catalan language Spanish drama film produced and directed by Ventura Pons and based on the award-winning stage play E.R. by Josep Maria Benet i Jornet. The film has no male actors, with all roles played by females. The film was produced in 1996.

== Synopsis ==
In order to prepare herself to play a role commemorating the life of legendary actress Empar Ribera, young actress (Mercè Pons) interviews three established actresses who had been the Ribera's pupils: the international diva Glòria Marc (Núria Espert), the television star Assumpta Roca (Rosa Maria Sardà), and dubbing director Maria Caminal (Anna Lizaran).

== Cast ==
- Núria Espert as Glòria Marc
- Rosa Maria Sardà as Assumpta Roca
- Anna Lizaran as Maria Caminal
- Mercè Pons as Estudiant

== Recognition ==
=== Screenings ===
Actrius screened in 2001 at the Grauman's Egyptian Theatre in an American Cinematheque retrospective of the works of its director. The film had first screened at the same location in 1998. It was also shown at the 1997 Stockholm International Film Festival.

=== Reception ===
In Movie - Film - Review, Christopher Tookey wrote that though the actresses were "competent in roles that may have some reference to their own careers", the film "is visually unimaginative, never escapes its stage origins, and is almost totally lacking in revelation or surprising incident". Noting that there were "occasional, refreshing moments of intergenerational bitchiness", they did not "justify comparisons to All About Eve", and were "insufficiently different to deserve critical parallels with Rashomon". He also wrote that The Guardian called the film a "slow, stuffy chamber-piece", and that The Evening Standard stated the film's "best moments exhibit the bitchy tantrums seething beneath the threesome's composed veneers". MRQE wrote "This cinematic adaptation of a theatrical work is true to the original, but does not stray far from a theatrical rendering of the story."

=== Awards and nominations ===
- 1997, won 'Best Catalan Film' at Butaca Awards for Ventura Pons
- 1997, won 'Best Catalan Film Actress' at Butaca Awards, shared by Núria Espert, Rosa Maria Sardà, Anna Lizaran, and Mercè Pons
- 1998, nominated for 'Best Screenplay' at Goya Awards, shared by Josep Maria Benet i Jornet and Ventura Pons
