= Anna Lizaran =

- Anna Lizaran interviewed in TV3
- Born: 31 August 1944; Esparreguera, Catalonia, Spain
- Died: 12 January 2013 (aged 68); Barcelona, Catalonia, Spain
- Occupation: Actress
- Years active: 1976–2012
- Notable work: La plaça del Diamant, Actrius, High Heels, Herois, Agost, Forasters, La Via Augusta, L'un per l'altre, Porca Misèria

Anna Lizaran (31 August 1944 – 12 January 2013) was a Catalan actress of stage, film and television.

== Biography ==
=== Early life ===
Lizaran's father was a mechanic and her mother a dressmaker. She showed enormous interest in the theatre when she was a child and studied theatre in the Centre d'Estudis Experimentals of Barcelona and was one of the first members of Els Comediants. In 1974, she moved to Paris to study with the mime Jacques Lecoq.

=== Career ===
When Lizaran returned to Barcelona in 1976, she started working in the Teatre Lliure. She since starred in such celebrated Spanish movies as High Heels (together with co-star Penélope Cruz) and Actrius. In 1996, she directed the TV show Arsènic i puntes de coixí for television. In 2005, she performed the character Rosa for the second season of the TV3 sitcom L'un per l'altre.

In her later years she performed in the television series La Via Augusta (2007), the film Herois (2010), and her latest theater performance was for the Catalan adaptation of August: Osage County as Violet and broke records for the Teatre Nacional de Catalunya.

=== Death ===
Lizaran died in the Hospital Clínic, Barcelona on the morning of 12 January 2013 of cancer at age 68. The cancer was diagnosed three months before her death. She was unable to release her latest theater work, La Bête.

== Filmography ==
- Morir (o no) (2000)
- La primera noche de mi vida(1998)
- Actrius (1997)
- La Celestina (1996)
- El perquè de tot plegat (1995)
- Souvenir (1994)
- High Heels (1991)
- La teranyina (1990)
- La plaça del diamant (1982)
- El vicari d'Olot(1980)
- Salut i força al canut (1979)

== Theater ==
- 1976: "Camí de nit, 1854".
- 1977: "Titus Andrònic" • "Leonci i Lena" • "La cacatúa verda" • "Ascensió i caiguda de la ciutat de Mahagonny".
- 1978: "La vida del Rei Eduard II d'Anglaterra" • "La nit de les tríbades" • "Hedda Gabler".
- 1979: "La bella Helena" • "Les tres germanes".
- 1980: "Jordi Dandin" • "El balcó".
- 1981: "Operació Ubú".
- 1982: "El misàntrop" • "Primera història d'Esther".
- 1983: "Al vostre gust" • "Advertència per a embarcacions petites".
- 1984: "Una jornada particular".
- 1985: "Un dels últims vespres de carnaval" • "La senyoreta Júlia".
- 1986: "La senyora de Sade".
- 1987: "Lorenzaccio, Lorenzaccio" • "El 30 d'abril".
- 1988: "La bona persona del Sezuàn".
- 1990: "Maria Estuard" • "Un capvespre al jardí".
- 1991: "El cántaro roto".
- 1992: "Dansa d'agost" • "El dol escau a Electra" • "El parc".
- 1993: "Roberto Zucco".
- 1994: "Un dels últims vespres de carnaval" • "Les noces de Fígaro" • "Quartet".
- 1995: "Arsènic i puntes de coixí".
- 1996: "Lear o el somni d'una actriu" • "El temps i l'habitació".
- 1998: "Quartet" • "Morir" • "Galatea".
- 1999: "Tot esperant Godot" • "La nit de les Tríbades".
- 2000: "L'hort dels cirerers".
- 2001: "L'adéu de Lucrècia Borja".
- 2002: "Escenes d'una execució" • "Testimoni Verdaguer".
- 2003: "Homenatge a Josep Montanyés" • "El retorn al desert".
- 2004: "Forasters" • "Dissabte, diumenge i dilluns".
- 2005: "Un matrimoni de Boston" • "Homenatge a Carlota Soldevila".
- 2006: "Rosencrantz y Guilderstein són morts" • "Hamlet" • "La tempestad" .
- 2010: "Agost" (August: Osage County)
