= Jordi Dauder =

Spanish actor (1938–2011)

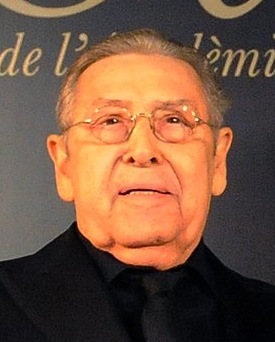
- Born: Jordi Dauder i Guardiola; 5 March 1938; Badalona (Barcelona), Spain
- Died: 16 September 2011 (aged 73); Madrid, Spain
- Occupation: Actor
- Years active: 1983–2011

Jordi Dauder i Guardiola (5 March 1938 – 16 September 2011) was a Spanish actor. Dauder was a veteran actor with a prolific career that includes over a hundred films, plays and television series.

He developed to the immense majority of his work in France, where he appeared as actor in productions different from theatre, simultaneously that was taking part in the different political organizations.

== Early life and career ==
Dauder was born in Barcelona, Spain. After graduating in Arts at the University of Barcelona and History at the University of Paris, where he had to emigrate for political reasons. They began taking their first steps into the theater as well as participating in various social movements that would provide the French revolution of May 1968.

Dauder is one of the side of Spanish cinema forever and participated in La flaqueza del Bolchevique (2003), of Martin Cuenca; Amor idiota (2004), of Ventura Pons; and La caja (2007).

In Azaña (2007), of Santiago San Miguel, he played President of the Second Spanish Republic Manuel Azaña. On television, one of his most recent roles he has played in the series for TV3 Nissaga de poder (1996).

Catalan was also an actor, voice-dubbing Gregory Peck or Nick Nolte, among others, as well as a writer, author of the novels and short stories and poetry.

Dauder was awarded the Sant Jordi Award for Best Spanish Actor (1991), the Audience Award for Best Catalan Actor (1997), and the Camino the Goya Award for Best Supporting Actor, and Award of the Spanish Actors Union (2009). In 2008, he received the Creu de Sant Jordi.

== Death ==
He died in Madrid on 16 September 2011.

== Filmography ==
- Warsaw bridge (1990)
- The Teranyina (1990), for Antoni Verdaguer
- The Punyalada (1990)
- The febre Gold (1993), for Gonzalo Herralde
- El pasajero clandestino (1995), for Agustí Villaronga
- El perquè de tot plegat (1995), for Ventura Pons
- Land and Freedom (1995), for Ken Loach
- Caresses (1997), for Ventura Pons
- Els sense nom (1999), for Jaume Balagueró
- The flaqueza del Bolshevik (2003)
- Amor idiota (2004), for Ventura Pons
- 199 Tips to Be Happy (2008), for Andrés Waissbluth
- Camino (2008), for Javier Fesser
- Of Love and Other Demons (2010)
- The Monk (2011)

== Theatre work ==
- Medea (1983), for Núria Espert
- El último vals (1992), for Samuel Beckett
- La Celestina (1996), Fernando de Rojas, per dirigir Hermann Bonnin
- El lector por horas (1999) by José Sanchis Sinisterra
- El alcalde de Zalamea (2000), for Sergi Belbel
- Via Gagarin (2003), Jesús Diez, a Teatre Nacional de Catalunya
- Don Gil de las verdes Calzas (2007), for Eduardo Vasco has Teatre Nacional de Catalunya
