= Mercè Pons =

Spanish actress

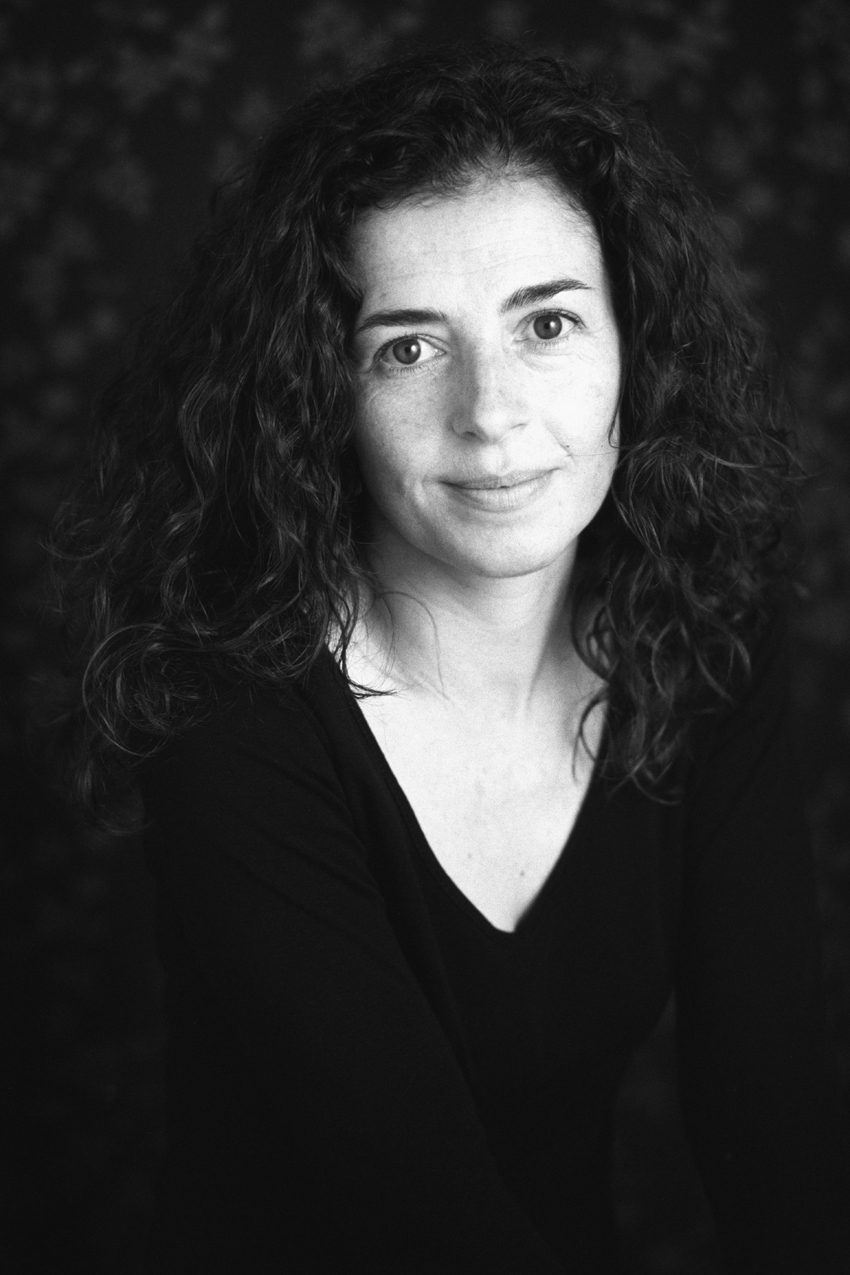
Image of Merce Pons

Mercè Pons is a known Spanish TV, dubbing, theatre and movie actress born in 1966.

Experienced in theatres and discos, she has taken part in several movies and TV series like Abuela de verano or Compañeros. She has dubbed herself in several films and made more works related to dubbing, like Animals ferits in 2006.

== Filmography ==
- Ens veiem demà (2009)
- Para que nadie olvide tu nombre (2006)
- Animales heridos (2006)
- La Atlántida (2005)
- Amor idiota (2004)
- Iris (2004)
- Valentín (2002)
- Km. 0 (2000)
- Morir (o no) (2000)
- Carícies (1998)
- Actrius (1997)
- Puede ser divertido (1995)
- El perquè de tot plegat (1995)
- El pasajero clandestino (1995)
- La novia moderna (1995)
- Atolladero (1995)
- Souvenir (1994)
- El beso perfecto (1994)
- La febre d'or(1993)
- Bufons i reis (1993)
- A Sorte cambia (1991)
- Nunca estás en casa (1991)
- Rateta, rateta (1990)
