= List of box office records set by Star Wars: The Force Awakens =

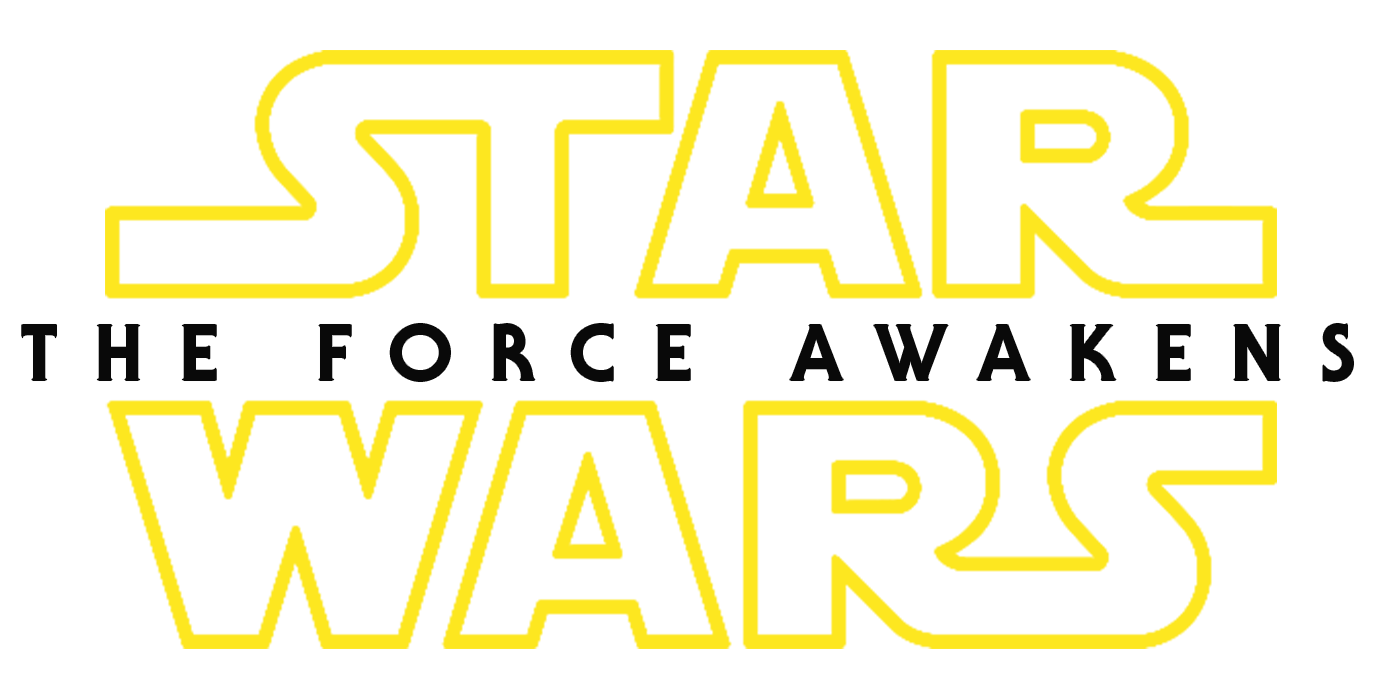
The film's official logo

Star Wars: The Force Awakens is the seventh film in the Star Wars franchise, released ten years after the previous entry. Co-written and directed by J. J. Abrams, the film stars Adam Driver, Daisy Ridley, John Boyega and Oscar Isaac in new roles, with Harrison Ford, Mark Hamill, and Carrie Fisher reprising their roles from the original trilogy which concluded in 1983. Prior to its release, the film was predicted by box office analysts to break records, citing the relative lack of competition owing to its date of release, being released in large formats such as IMAX in a high number of venues, and multi-generational appeal to both fans of the previous movies and children as success factors.

The Force Awakens was released in December 2015 and went on to break multiple box office records in various markets. The film set the worldwide records for the highest-grossing opening weekend and the fastest to gross $1 billion. In its domestic market of the United States and Canada, it set the records for the highest-grossing film, opening day, first through third weekends, and single calendar month, as well as the fastest cumulative grosses through $900 million. In other markets, it became the highest-grossing film in the United Kingdom and set opening weekend records in several countries including the UK, Germany, Australia, and Russia.

A large proportion of the records were set in the domestic market of the United States and Canada. A comparative lack of Star Wars nostalgia and unfavourable currency exchange rates were identified as factors limiting the film's box office performance in other markets, while repeat viewings during the December holiday season boosted sales in the domestic market. A compounding factor is that whereas the US and Canada box office is closely tracked by sites such as Box Office Mojo and The Numbers, the same is not true for other box office territories. Many of the records set by the film are listed below. Data on the previous record and records that have since been surpassed are presented where available and applicable. All grosses are given in unadjusted US dollars, except where noted otherwise.

== Worldwide ==
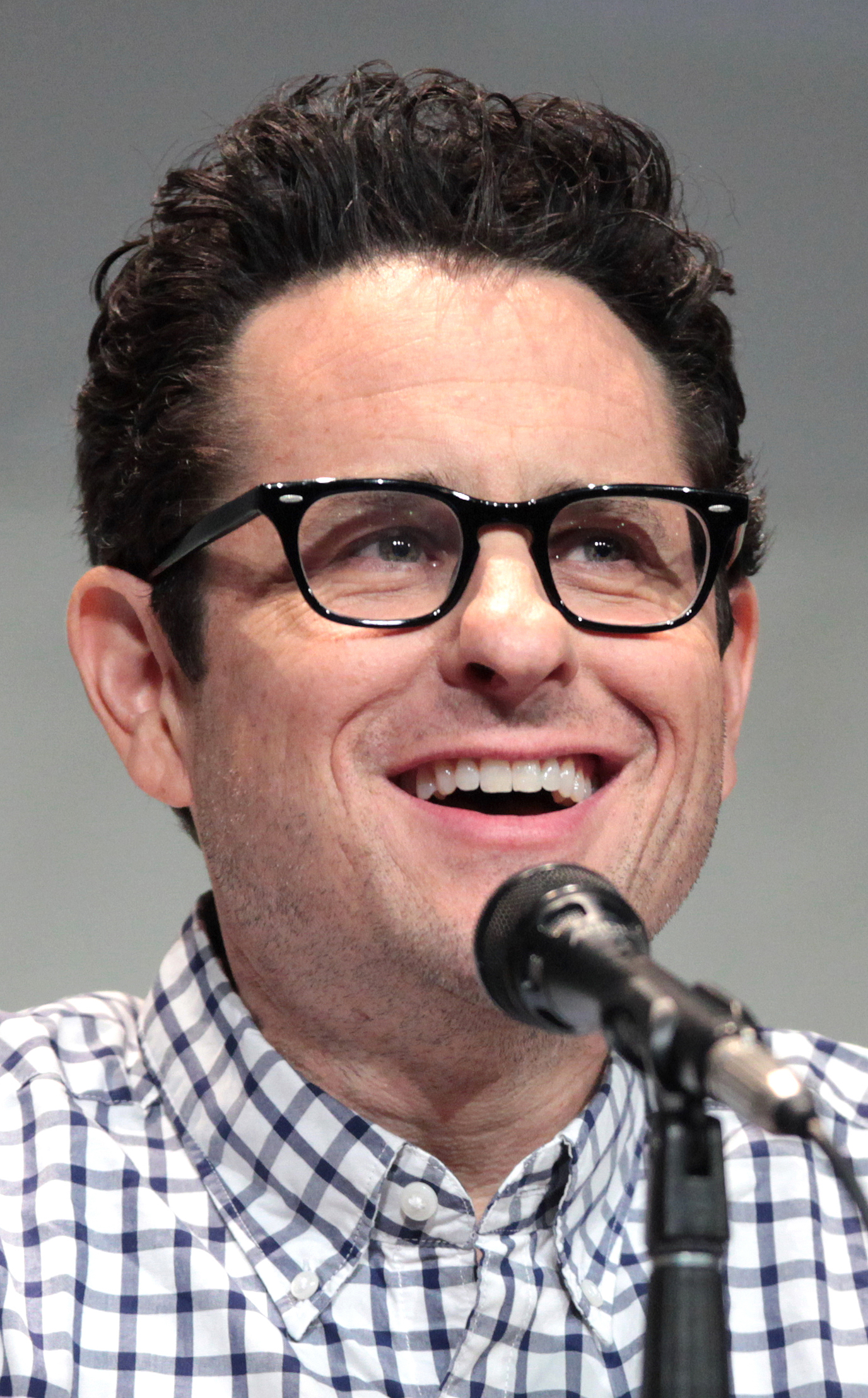
The Force Awakens is director J. J. Abrams' highest-grossing film.

Worldwide, the film set records for the highest-grossing opening weekend and the fastest to gross $1 billion, as well as several IMAX records.

Record	Figure	Previous record holder	Surpassed by	Notes
Fastest film to gross $1 billion	12 days	Jurassic World – 13 days	Avengers: Infinity War – 11 days	
Highest worldwide opening weekend and single weekend gross	$529 million	Jurassic World – $525 million	The Fate of the Furious – $541 million	
Widest IMAX release	940 screens	Jurassic World – 809 screens	Star Wars: The Last Jedi – over 1,200 theaters	This included 392 IMAX screens in the United States and Canada and 272 screens in China.
Highest IMAX opening weekend gross	$48 million	Jurassic World – $44.1 million	Avengers: Endgame – $91.5 million	
Highest IMAX single-day gross	$17.7 million	Jurassic World – $13 million	Avengers: Endgame (see note)	On Friday, December 18, 2015. Endgame grossed $91.5 million on its 5-day opening weekend April 24–28, 2019 for an average of $18.3 million per day.
Fastest to $100 million in IMAX ticket sales	12 days	Jurassic World – 18 days	Avengers: Endgame (see note)	It grossed $106 million in that time. Endgame grossed $170 million in 12 days.
Fastest to $150 million in IMAX ticket sales	19 days	Avatar – 47 days	Avengers: Endgame (see note)	It grossed $152 million in that time. Endgame grossed $170 million in 12 days.
Fastest to $175 million in IMAX ticket sales	24 days	Avatar – 58 days	The Odyssey (see note)	It grossed $179 million in that time. The Odyssey grossed $200 million within three weeks.
Fastest to $200 million in IMAX ticket sales	35 days	Avatar – 68 days	The Odyssey (see note)	It grossed $207 million in that time. The Odyssey grossed $200 million within three weeks.

== United States and Canada ==
Record Grosses
Day	Gross	Total
1 (F)	119.1m†	119.1m
2 (Sa)	68.2m	187.4m
3 (Su)	60.5m‡	247.9m
1st wknd	247.9m†	247.9m
4 (M)	40.1m‡	288.0m
5 (Tu)	37.3m‡	325.4m
6 (W)	38.0m#	363.4m
7 (Th)	27.3m	390.8m
1st week	390.8m†	390.8m
2nd wknd	149.2m‡	540.0m
3rd wknd	90.2m‡	742.2m
20 (Th)	6.2m	764.4m†
23 (Sa)	19.2m	800.3m†
50 (F)	1.7m	900.8m†
† indicates a single day record, single weekend record, single week record, or cumulative gross record. ‡ indicates a day of the week record or non-opening weekend record. # indicates a non-opening day of the week record. All of the cumulative grosses were records within their time frame.

In the domestic market, the film grossed more money faster than any previous film. It set several records for specific time frames and days of the week, including ones that were still records when adjusting for inflation. Many of the records it broke were set by Jurassic World, which was released six months prior in June 2015.

Record	Figure	Previous record holder	Surpassed by	Notes
Highest-grossing film of all time	$936 million	Avatar – $760 million	Spider-Man: Brand New Day – $936 million	
Fastest to become the highest-grossing film	20 days	—N/a	—N/a	
Fastest to $100 million	21 hours	Jurassic World – 2 days	Avengers: Endgame – 17 hours	
Fastest to $150 million	2 days	Jurassic World – 2 days	Avengers: Infinity War – 2 days	It grossed $187 million in that time. Jurassic World grossed $151 million. Infinity War grossed $188 million.
Fastest to $200 million	3 days	Jurassic World – 3 days	Avengers: Infinity War – 3 days	It grossed $247 million in that time. Jurassic World grossed $208 million. Infinity War grossed $188 million.
Fastest to $250 million	4 days	Jurassic World – 5 days	Avengers: Infinity War – 3 days	It grossed $288 million in that time.
Fastest to $300 million	5 days	Jurassic World – 8 days	Avengers: Endgame – 3 days	It grossed $325 million in that time.
Fastest to $350 million	6 days	Jurassic World – 9 days	Avengers: Endgame – 3 days	It grossed $363 million in that time.
Fastest to $400 million	8 days	Jurassic World – 10 days	Avengers: Endgame – 5 days	It grossed $440 million in that time.
Fastest to $450 million	9 days	Jurassic World – 15 days	Avengers: Endgame – 6 days	It grossed $496 million in that time.
Fastest to $500 million	10 days	Jurassic World – 17 days	Avengers: Endgame – 8 days	It grossed $540 million in that time.
Fastest to $550 million	11 days	Jurassic World – 24 days	Avengers: Endgame – 9 days	It grossed $571 million in that time.
Fastest to $600 million	12 days	Jurassic World – 36 days	Avengers: Endgame – 10 days	It grossed $600 million in that time.
Fastest to $650 million	14 days	Avatar – 58 days	Avengers: Endgame – 13 days	It grossed $651 million in that time.
Fastest to $700 million	16 days	Avatar – 72 days	Spider-Man: Brand New Day – 13 days	It grossed $720 million in that time.
Fastest to $750 million	18 days	Avatar – 253 days	Spider-Man: Brand New Day – 16 days	It grossed $750 million in that time.
Fastest to $800 million	23 days	It was the first movie to reach that gross.	Spider-Man: Brand New Day – 19 days	It grossed $800 million in that time.
Fastest to $850 million	31 days	It was the first movie to reach that gross.	Spider-Man: Brand New Day – 24 days	It grossed $852 million in that time.
Fastest to $900 million	50 days	It was the first movie to reach that gross.	Spider-Man: Brand New Day – 36 days	It grossed $900 million in that time.
Highest opening weekend and single weekend gross	$247 million	Jurassic World – $208 million	Avengers: Infinity War – $257 million	
Highest opening weekend gross adjusted for inflation	est. 28.5–28.8 million tickets	The Avengers – est. 25.5 million tickets	Avengers: Endgame – est. 39.6 million tickets	Lower bound estimate by Box Office Mojo. Upper bound estimate by Forbes.
Highest opening week gross	$390 million	Jurassic World – $296 million	Avengers: Endgame – $473 million	Gross from Friday, December 18, 2015 through Thursday, December 24, 2015.
Highest second weekend gross	$149 million	Jurassic World – $106 million	—N/a	Its second weekend was also the 12th highest-grossing weekend of all time.
Highest third weekend gross	$90.2 million	Avatar – $68.4 million	—N/a	
Highest pre-sales gross	$100+ million	The Dark Knight Rises – $25 million	—N/a	
Highest previews gross	$57 million	Harry Potter and the Deathly Hallows – Part 2 – $43.5 million	Avengers: Endgame – $60 million	Includes "Star Wars Marathon Event" grosses from 135 theaters in which all six previous Star Wars films were shown along with The Force Awakens.
Largest Friday to Saturday drop	$50.8 million	Harry Potter and the Deathly Hallows – Part 2 – $48.6 million	—N/a	In percentage terms, the film dropped 42%, which was far from The Ringer's wide release record of 72%.
Highest weekend per-theater average for a wide release	$59.9 thousand per theater	Jurassic World – $48.8 thousand	Avengers: Endgame – $76.6 thousand	
Number one film of the highest-grossing single aggregated weekend	$313 million	June 12–14, 2015 – $273 million	April 26–28, 2019 – $401 million	The figure represents the combined gross of all movies in theaters on the weekend of December 18–20, 2015 of which The Force Awakens grossed $247 million (79.2%). Jurassic World contributed $208 million (76.2%) to the previous record. Avengers: Endgame contributed $357 million (88.8%) to the one that surpassed it.
Largest gap between first and second highest-grossing films in a weekend	$233 million	The Avengers – $199 million	Avengers: Infinity War – $246 million	The second-highest-grossing film on December 18–20, 2015 was Alvin and the Chipmunks: The Road Chip. For The Avengers (May 4–6, 2012), it was Think Like a Man. For Infinity War (April 27–29, 2018), it was A Quiet Place.
Largest gap between first and second highest-grossing films in their opening weekends	$233 million	The Dark Knight – $130 million	—N/a	The second-highest-grossing film opening on December 18–20, 2015 was Alvin and the Chipmunks: The Road Chip. For The Dark Knight (July 18–20, 2008), it was Mamma Mia!
Largest relative gap between first and second highest-grossing films in their opening weekends	17.4 times higher gross	Alice in Wonderland – 8.7 times higher gross	—N/a	The second-highest-grossing film opening on December 18–20, 2015 was Alvin and the Chipmunks: The Road Chip. For Alice in Wonderland (March 5–7, 2010), it was Brooklyn's Finest.
Highest gross in a single calendar month	$652 million	The Avengers – $532 million	—N/a	Gross from December 2015. For The Avengers, it was May 2012.
Highest 3-day gross	$247 million	Jurassic World – $208 million	Avengers: Infinity War – $257 million	Remained the record when adjusting for inflation with est. 28.5 million tickets until Avengers: Endgame's sold est. 38.8 million tickets.
Highest 4-day gross	$288 million	Jurassic World – $234 million	Avengers: Endgame – $393 million	Was also the record when adjusting for inflation with est. 33.1 million tickets until Endgame sold est. 43.7 million tickets.
Highest 5-day gross	$325 million	Jurassic World – $258 million	Avengers: Endgame – $427 million	Was also the record when adjusting for inflation with est. 37.4 million tickets until Endgame sold est. 47.4 million tickets.
Highest 6-day gross	$363 million	Jurassic World – $278 million	Avengers: Endgame – $452 million	Was also the record when adjusting for inflation with est. 41.7 million tickets until Endgame sold est. 50.2 million tickets.
Highest 7-day gross	$390 million	Jurassic World – $296 million	Avengers: Endgame – $473 million	Was also the record when adjusting for inflation with est. 44.9 million tickets until Endgame sold est. 52.5 million tickets.
Highest 8-day gross	$440 million	Jurassic World – $325 million	Avengers: Endgame – $514 million	Was also the record when adjusting for inflation with est. 50.5 million tickets until Endgame sold est. 57.1 million tickets.
Highest 9-day gross	$496 million	Jurassic World – $364 million	Avengers: Endgame – $576 million	Was also the record when adjusting for inflation with est. 57.1 million tickets until Endgame sold est. 63.9 million tickets.
Highest 10-day gross	$540 million	Jurassic World – $402 million	Avengers: Endgame – $621 million	Was also the record when adjusting for inflation with est. 62.0 million tickets until Endgame sold est. 68.9 million tickets.
Highest IMAX single day pre-sales gross	$6.5 million	No movie had sold more than $1 million in a single day before.	—N/a	
Highest IMAX Thursday night previews gross	$5.7 million	Avengers: Age of Ultron – $3 million	—N/a	
Highest IMAX single-day gross	$14 million	Jurassic World – $8.6 million	—N/a	On Friday, December 18, 2015. For Jurassic World, it was Friday, June 12, 2015.
Highest IMAX opening weekend gross	$30.1 million	Jurassic World – $20.9 million	—N/a	
Widest IMAX release	392 screens	Jurassic World – 363 screens	Avengers: Infinity War – 408 screens	
Highest single day gross	$119 million	Harry Potter and the Deathly Hallows – Part 2 – $91.0 million	Avengers: Endgame – $157 million	On Friday, December 18, 2015. For Deathly Hallows, it was Friday, July 15, 2011. For Endgame, it was Friday, April 26, 2019.
Highest opening day gross	$119 million	Harry Potter and the Deathly Hallows – Part 2 – $91.0 million	Avengers: Endgame – $157 million	
Highest Friday gross	$119 million	Harry Potter and the Deathly Hallows – Part 2 – $91.0 million	Avengers: Endgame – $157 million	The figure includes $57 million grossed from Thursday night previews. Excluding this amount, it achieved the third highest "pure Friday" gross with $62.1 million behind Jurassic World ($63.4 million) and The Avengers ($62.7 million).
Highest single-day gross adjusted for inflation	est. 13.6 million tickets	Harry Potter and the Deathly Hallows – Part 2 – est. 11.4 million tickets	Avengers: Endgame – est. 17.3 million tickets	
Highest Sunday gross	$60.5 million	Jurassic World – $57.2 million	Avengers: Infinity War – $69.2 million	On December 20, 2015. For Jurassic World, it was June 14, 2015. For Infinity War, it was April 29, 2018.
Highest Monday gross	$40.1 million	Spider-Man 2 – $27.6 million	Black Panther – $40.1 million	On December 21, 2015. For Spider-Man 2, it was July 5, 2004. For Black Panther, it was February 19, 2018.
Highest non-holiday Monday gross	$40.1 million	Jurassic World – $25.3 million	—N/a	Jurassic World's record was set on June 15, 2015.
Highest Monday gross adjusted for inflation	est. 4.6 million tickets	Spider-Man 2 – est. 4.4 million tickets	—N/a	
Highest Tuesday gross	$37.3 million	The Amazing Spider-Man – $35.0 million	Spider-Man: Far From Home – $39.2 million	On December 22, 2015. For The Amazing Spider-Man, it was July 3, 2012 – its opening day. For Far From Home, it was July 2, 2019 – its opening day.
Highest non-opening Tuesday gross	$37.3 million	Jurassic World – $24.3 million	Spider-Man: Brand New Day – $42.0 million	Jurassic World's record was set on June 16, 2015. For Brand New Day, it was August 4, 2026.
Highest non-opening Wednesday gross	$38.0 million	Transformers – 29.0 million	—N/a	On December 23, 2015. For Transformers, it was July 4, 2007– its second day of release.
Highest Christmas Eve gross	$27.1 million	Avatar – $11.2 million	—N/a	Avatar's record was set in 2009.
Highest Christmas Day gross	$49.3 million	Sherlock Holmes – $24.6 million	—N/a	Sherlock Holmes' record was set in 2009.
Highest non-opening Friday gross	$49.3 million	Transformers: Revenge of the Fallen – $36.7 million	The Super Mario Bros. Movie –$54.8 million	On December 25, 2015. For Revenge of the Fallen, it was June 26, 2009 – its third day of release. For The Super Mario Bros. Movie, it was April 7, 2023 – its third day of release.
Highest non-opening week Friday gross	$49.3 million	The Hunger Games: Catching Fire – $31.5 million	—N/a	Catching Fire's record was set on November 29, 2013.
Highest non-opening week Saturday gross	$56.7 million	The Avengers – $42.9 million	Avengers: Endgame – $61.5 million	On December 26, 2015. For The Avengers, it was May 12, 2012. For Endgame, it was May 4, 2019.
Highest non-opening week Sunday gross	$43.1 million	Jurassic World – $38.3 million	Avengers: Endgame – $45.1 million	On December 27, 2015. For Jurassic World, it was June 21, 2015. For Endgame, it was May 5, 2019.
Highest non-opening week Monday gross	$31.3 million	Shrek 2 – $23.4 million	Rogue One – $32.0 million	On December 28, 2015. For Shrek 2, it was May 31, 2004. For Rogue One, it was December 26, 2016.
Highest non-opening week Tuesday gross	$29.5 million	Avatar – $18.2 million	—N/a	On December 29, 2015. For Avatar, it was December 29, 2009.
Highest non-opening week Wednesday gross	$28.0 million	Avatar – $18.4 million	—N/a	On December 30, 2015. For Avatar, it was December 30, 2009.
Highest non-opening week Thursday gross	$22.9 million	The Lord of the Rings: The Two Towers – $15.4 million	—N/a	On December 31, 2015. For The Two Towers, it was December 26, 2002.
Highest New Year's Day gross	$34.3 million	Avatar – $25.2 million	—N/a	Avatar's record was set in 2010.

== Other territories ==
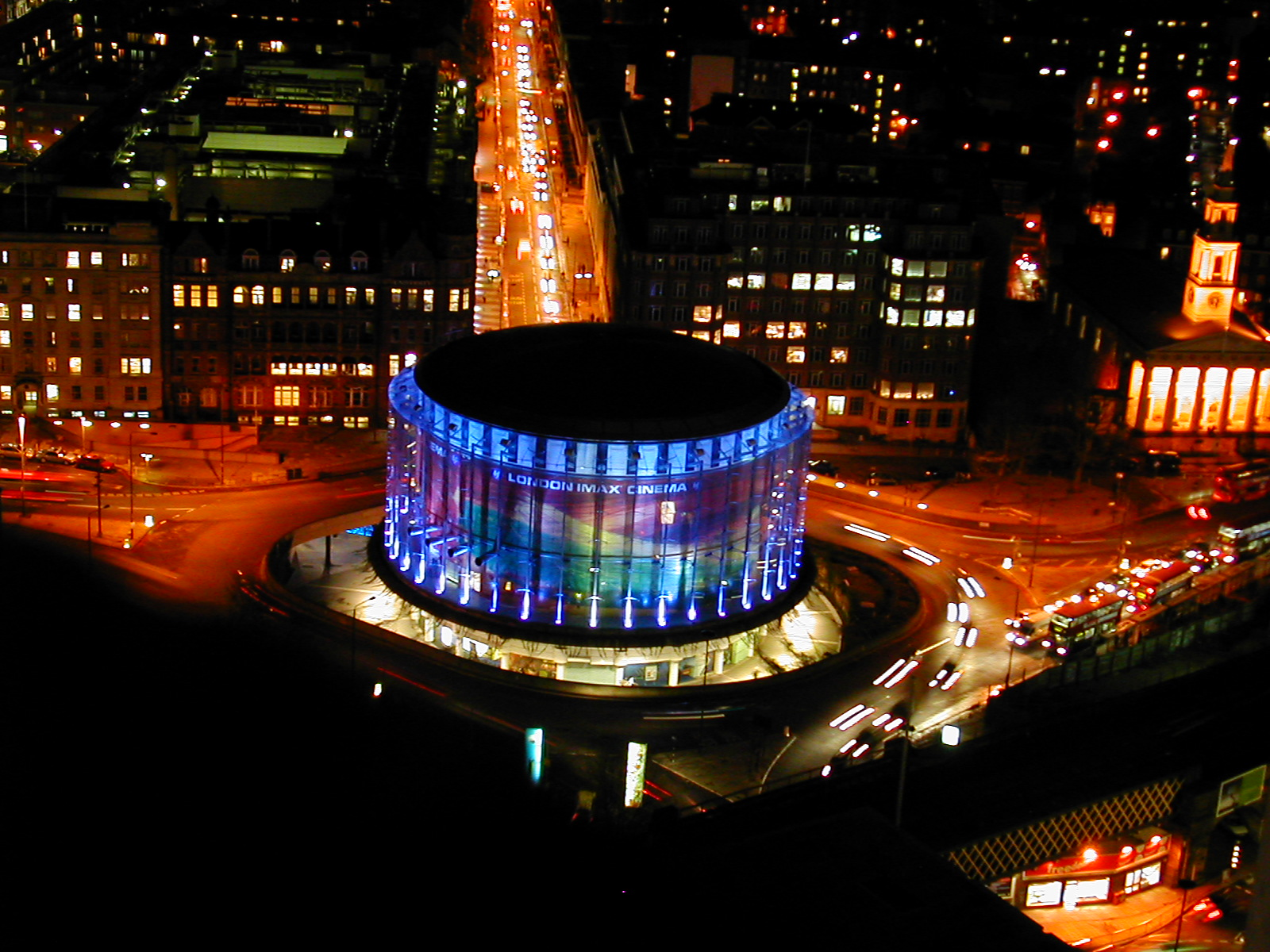
The BFI IMAX in London is the highest-grossing IMAX cinema in the world for The Force Awakens.

Outside of the United States and Canada market, the film set opening records in one form or another in 30 different markets. The United Kingdom and Ireland market saw several records surpassed, including the record for the highest-grossing film of all time. Data on precise figures, previous record holders, and surpassed records is limited due to the absence of box office record trackers for these markets.

Record	Territory	Figure	Previous record holder	Surpassed by	Notes
Highest-grossing film of all time	United Kingdom and Ireland	£123 million	Skyfall – £103 million	—N/a	
Highest four-day opening weekend gross	United Kingdom and Ireland	£34.0 million	—N/a	Avengers: Endgame – £43.4 million	
Largest share of weekend gross	United Kingdom and Ireland	83%	—N/a	—N/a	
Highest three-day opening weekend gross	United Kingdom and Ireland	£24.3 million	Harry Potter and the Deathly Hallows – Part 2 – £23.7 million	Avengers: Endgame – £31.4 million	
Highest opening day gross	United Kingdom and Ireland	£9.6 million ($14.3 million)	Harry Potter and the Deathly Hallows – Part 2 – £9.5 million	Avengers: Endgame – £11.9 million ($15.3 million)	Includes midnight preview grosses.
Highest single day gross	United Kingdom and Ireland	£9.6 million ($14.3 million)	Harry Potter and the Deathly Hallows – Part 2 – £9.5 million	Avengers: Endgame (see note)	Endgame surpassed the record with £11.9 million on its opening day on April 25, 2019, and then improved upon it further by grossing £12.1 million on April 27, 2019.
Highest number of advance ticket sales	United Kingdom and Ireland	2 million	—N/a	—N/a	
Widest release of all time	United Kingdom and Ireland	670 cinemas	Spectre – 647 cinemas	Star Wars: The Last Jedi – 723 cinemas	
Highest midnight gross	United Kingdom and Ireland	£2.4 million	—N/a	—N/a	
Highest Saturday gross	United Kingdom and Ireland	£8.7 million	—N/a	Avengers: Infinity War – £9.2 million	On December 19, 2015. Infinity War was April 28, 2018.
Highest Sunday gross	United Kingdom and Ireland	£8.5 million	—N/a	Avengers: Endgame – £10.2 million	On December 20, 2015. Endgame was April 28, 2019.
Highest Monday gross	United Kingdom and Ireland	£5.8 million	Harry Potter and the Prisoner of Azkaban – £5.0 million	—N/a	On December 21, 2015. Prisoner of Azkaban's record was set during the Bank holiday in 2004.
Highest Boxing Day gross	United Kingdom and Ireland	—N/a	—N/a	—N/a	
Highest-grossing film in IMAX	United Kingdom and Ireland	£8.2 million	—N/a	—N/a	
Highest IMAX opening weekend gross	United Kingdom and Ireland	—N/a	—N/a	—N/a	
Fastest film to gross £100 million	United Kingdom and Ireland	20 days	Skyfall – 66 days	—N/a	
Highest Saturday to Sunday opening weekend gross	China	$52.6 million	Mission: Impossible – Rogue Nation (surpassed by 70%)	Journey to the West: The Demons Strike Back – ¥553 million ($80.4 million)	
Highest two-day IMAX opening weekend gross	China	$8.1 million	Avengers: Age of Ultron – $6.6 million	—N/a	
Highest IMAX Saturday gross	China	¥27.7 million ($4.3 million)	Avengers: Age of Ultron – ¥22.8 million	—N/a	On January 9, 2016.
Highest opening weekend gross	Australia	$19.6 million	—N/a	Avengers: Endgame – $30.8 million	
Highest opening weekend gross	Austria	$1.9 million	—N/a	Avengers: Endgame – $3.5 million	
Highest opening weekend gross	Bulgaria	$640 thousand	Ice Age: Dawn of the Dinosaurs – $494 thousand	—N/a	
Highest opening weekend gross	Croatia	—N/a	—N/a	Avengers: Endgame – $545 thousand	
Highest opening weekend gross	Denmark	—N/a	—N/a	Avengers: Endgame – $4.2 million	5-day weekend record.
Highest opening weekend gross	Finland	$1.6 million	—N/a	The Unknown Soldier – $1.9 million	
Highest opening weekend gross	Germany	$27.5 million	—N/a	—N/a	
Highest opening weekend gross	Hungary	$1.5 million	—N/a	Star Wars: The Last Jedi – $1.5 million	
Highest opening weekend gross	Iceland	$189 thousand	—N/a	Rogue One – $197 thousand	
Highest opening weekend gross	New Zealand	$3.0 million	Harry Potter and the Deathly Hallows – Part 2 – $2.4 million	Avengers: Endgame – $4.0 million	
Highest opening weekend gross	Norway	—N/a	—N/a	Avengers: Endgame – $2.5 million	
Highest opening weekend gross	Poland	—N/a	—N/a	—N/a	3-day weekend record.
Highest opening weekend gross	Romania	$960 thousand	—N/a	The Fate of the Furious – $1.7 million	
Highest opening weekend gross	Russia	$12.3 million	—N/a	Deadpool – $13.1 million	
Highest opening weekend gross	Serbia	—N/a	—N/a	Avengers: Endgame – $410 thousand	
Highest opening weekend gross	Sweden	$3.9 million	—N/a	Star Wars: The Last Jedi – $5.9 million	
Highest opening weekend gross	Ukraine	$1.1 million	—N/a	Avengers: Endgame – $1.9 million	
Highest opening day gross	Australia	$6.8 million	—N/a	Avengers: Endgame – $7 million	
Highest opening day gross	Austria	—N/a	—N/a	—N/a	
Highest opening day gross	Belgium	$800 thousand	—N/a	—N/a	
Highest opening day gross	Brazil	$2.7 million	—N/a	Avengers: Infinity War – $4.8 million	
Highest opening day gross	Chile	—N/a	—N/a	Avengers: Infinity War	
Highest opening day gross	Croatia	—N/a	—N/a	—N/a	
Highest opening day gross	Finland	$600 thousand	—N/a	—N/a	
Highest opening day gross	Germany	—N/a	—N/a	—N/a	
Highest opening day gross	Hungary	—N/a	—N/a	Avengers: Endgame	
Highest opening day gross	Iceland	—N/a	—N/a	—N/a	
Highest opening day gross	The Netherlands	$800 thousand	—N/a	—N/a	
Highest opening day gross	New Zealand	—N/a	—N/a	Avengers: Endgame	
Highest opening day gross	Norway	$1.1 million	—N/a	—N/a	
Highest opening day gross	Peru	—N/a	—N/a	Avengers: Infinity War	
Highest opening day gross	Poland	—N/a	—N/a	—N/a	
Highest opening day gross	Serbia	—N/a	—N/a	—N/a	
Highest opening day gross	Slovakia	—N/a	—N/a	—N/a	
Highest opening day gross	Sweden	$1.7 million	—N/a	—N/a	
Highest opening day gross	Switzerland (French-speaking)	—N/a	—N/a	—N/a	
Highest opening day gross	Ukraine	—N/a	—N/a	Avengers: Endgame	
Highest IMAX opening weekend gross	Australia	—N/a	—N/a	—N/a	
Highest IMAX opening weekend gross	Austria	—N/a	—N/a	Avengers: Endgame	
Highest IMAX opening weekend gross	Bahrain	—N/a	—N/a	Avengers: Endgame	
Highest IMAX opening weekend gross	Brazil	—N/a	—N/a	Avengers: Infinity War	
Highest IMAX opening weekend gross	Bulgaria	—N/a	—N/a	Avengers: Endgame	
Highest IMAX opening weekend gross	Chile	—N/a	—N/a	Avengers: Endgame	
Highest IMAX opening weekend gross	Costa Rica	—N/a	—N/a	Avengers: Endgame	
Highest IMAX opening weekend gross	Denmark	—N/a	—N/a	Star Wars: The Last Jedi	
Highest IMAX opening weekend gross	France	—N/a	—N/a	Star Wars: The Last Jedi	
Highest IMAX opening weekend gross	Germany	—N/a	—N/a	Captain Marvel	
Highest IMAX opening weekend gross	Israel	—N/a	—N/a	Avengers: Endgame	
Highest IMAX opening weekend gross	Italy	—N/a	—N/a	Star Wars: The Last Jedi	
Highest IMAX opening weekend gross	Japan	—N/a	Avatar	Star Wars: The Last Jedi	
Highest IMAX opening weekend gross	Netherlands	—N/a	—N/a	—N/a	
Highest IMAX opening weekend gross	New Zealand	—N/a	—N/a	Avengers: Endgame	
Highest IMAX opening weekend gross	Portugal	—N/a	—N/a	Avengers: Endgame	
Highest IMAX opening weekend gross	Russia	—N/a	—N/a	—N/a	
Highest IMAX opening weekend gross	Singapore	—N/a	—N/a	Avengers: Endgame	
Highest IMAX opening weekend gross	South Africa	—N/a	—N/a	Avengers: Endgame	
Highest IMAX opening weekend gross	Sweden	—N/a	—N/a	Star Wars: The Last Jedi	
Highest IMAX opening weekend gross	Switzerland	—N/a	—N/a	Avengers: Endgame	
Highest IMAX opening weekend gross	Turkey	—N/a	—N/a	Avengers: Endgame	
Highest IMAX opening day gross	Australia	—N/a	—N/a	—N/a	
Highest IMAX opening day gross	Austria	—N/a	—N/a	—N/a	
Highest IMAX opening day gross	Brazil	—N/a	—N/a	Avengers: Endgame	
Highest IMAX opening day gross	Chile	—N/a	—N/a	—N/a	
Highest IMAX opening day gross	Costa Rica	—N/a	—N/a	—N/a	
Highest IMAX opening day gross	Germany	—N/a	—N/a	Avengers: Endgame	
Highest IMAX opening day gross	Hong Kong	—N/a	—N/a	—N/a	
Highest IMAX opening day gross	Mexico	—N/a	—N/a	Avengers: Endgame	
Highest IMAX opening day gross	New Zealand	—N/a	—N/a	—N/a	
Highest IMAX opening day gross	Portugal	—N/a	—N/a	—N/a	
Highest IMAX opening day gross	Qatar	—N/a	—N/a	—N/a	
Highest IMAX opening day gross	Singapore	—N/a	—N/a	—N/a	
Highest IMAX opening day gross	Thailand	—N/a	—N/a	—N/a	
Highest IMAX opening day gross	Trinidad	—N/a	—N/a	—N/a	
Highest IMAX opening day gross	Turkey	—N/a	—N/a	—N/a	
Highest IMAX opening day gross	United Arab Emirates	—N/a	—N/a	Avengers: Endgame	
Highest single day gross	Germany	$6.8 million	—N/a	—N/a	
Highest single day gross	Hungary	—N/a	—N/a	—N/a	
Highest single day gross	Iceland	—N/a	—N/a	—N/a	
Highest single day gross	Norway	$1.1 million	—N/a	—N/a	
Highest single day gross	Sweden	$1.7 million	—N/a	—N/a	
Highest Monday gross	Denmark	—N/a	—N/a	—N/a	On December 21, 2015.
Highest Monday gross	Finland	—N/a	—N/a	—N/a	On December 21, 2015.
Highest Monday gross	France	—N/a	—N/a	—N/a	On December 21, 2015.
Highest Monday gross	Norway	—N/a	—N/a	—N/a	On December 21, 2015.
Highest Monday gross	Ukraine	—N/a	—N/a	—N/a	On December 21, 2015.
Highest second weekend gross	Australia	—N/a	Harry Potter and the Deathly Hallows – Part 2 (surpassed by 32%)	—N/a	
Fastest to gross ¥7 billion	Japan	20 days	Frozen – 23 days	—N/a	
