= List of box office records set by Avengers: Infinity War =

The film's official logo

Avengers: Infinity War is the third Avengers film and the nineteenth film in the Marvel Cinematic Universe (MCU), released six years after the first Avengers film and ten years after the first MCU film. Directed by Anthony and Joe Russo, the film features an ensemble cast of actors reprising their roles from previous entries in the MCU. Box office analysts identified positive word of mouth and anticipation built up over the course of the MCU as factors working in the film's favor.

Infinity War was released in April 2018 and went on to break multiple box office records in various markets. Worldwide, it set the record for the highest opening weekend gross, was the fastest film ever to gross $1 billion and $1.5 billion, and became the highest-grossing film of 2018. In its domestic market of the United States and Canada, the film set records for the highest-grossing opening weekend, Saturday, and Sunday, as well as the fastest cumulative grosses to $150 million through $250 million. Elsewhere, it became the highest-grossing film of all time in more than ten markets including Brazil, Mexico, and the Philippines.

Many of the records set by the film are listed below. Data on the previous record and records that have since been surpassed are presented where available and applicable. All grosses are given in unadjusted US dollars, except where noted otherwise.

== Worldwide ==
Avengers: Infinity War grossed $2,048,359,754 worldwide. The film set records for the highest-grossing opening weekend, was the fastest to gross $1 billion through $1.5 billion, and achieved the highest gross in the 4DX format.

Record	Figure	Previous record holder	Surpassed by
Highest opening weekend and single weekend gross	$640.5 million	The Fate of the Furious – $541.9 million	Avengers: Endgame – $1.223 billion
Fastest to gross $1 billion	11 days	Star Wars: The Force Awakens – 12 days	Avengers: Endgame – 5 days
Fastest to gross $1.5 billion	18 days	Star Wars: The Force Awakens – 19 days	Avengers: Endgame – 8 days
Highest-grossing superhero movie	$2.048 billion	The Avengers – $1.517 billion	Avengers: Endgame – $2.795 billion
Highest 3D opening weekend gross	$366 million	—N/a	Avengers: Endgame – $540 million
Highest-grossing movie of 2018	$2.048 billion	—N/a	—N/a

== United States and Canada ==
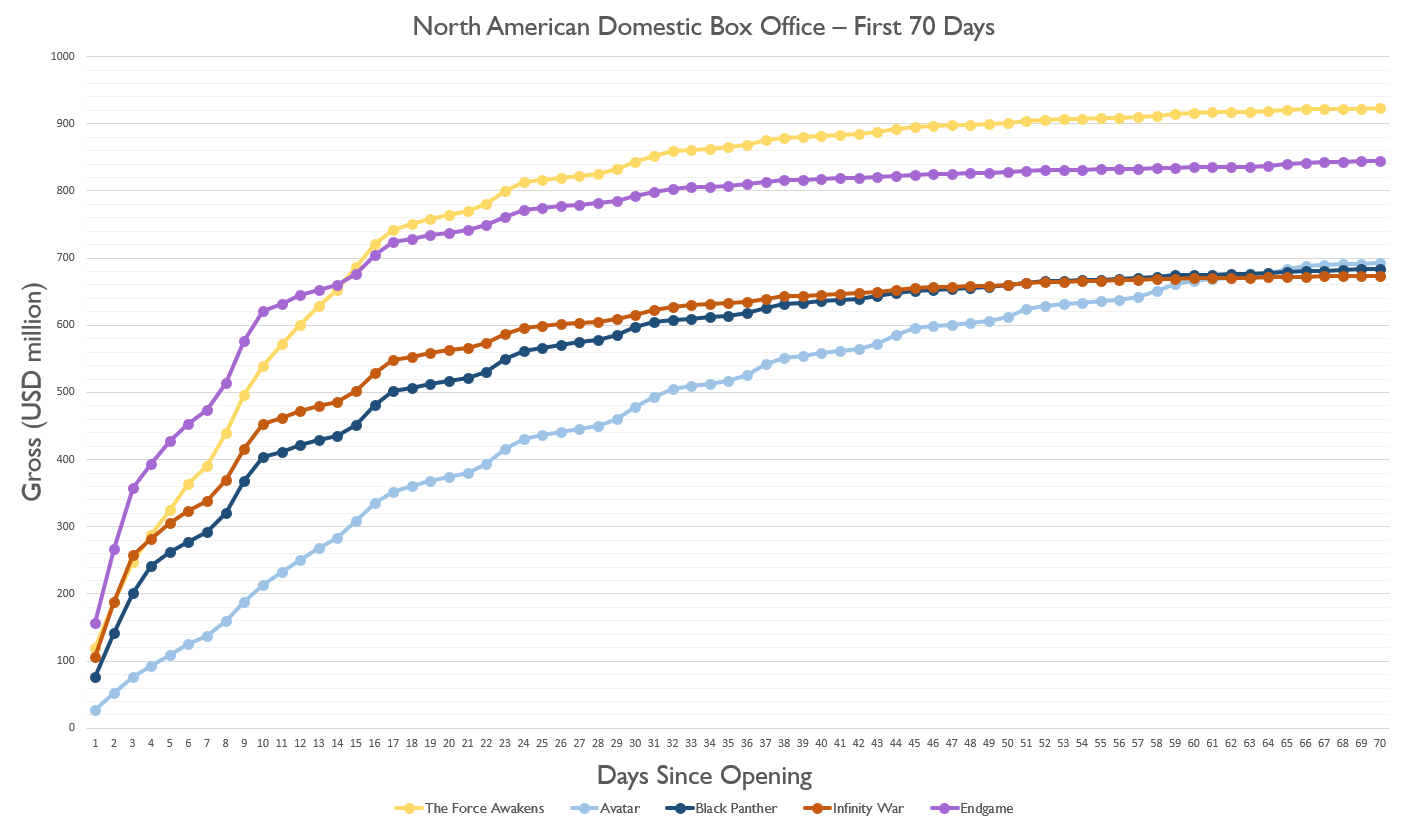
Chart of the North American box office gross of Avengers: Infinity War against the four highest-grossing films in the market up to 2020.

Avengers: Infinity War grossed $678,815,482 in the United States and Canada. The film set records for the highest-grossing opening weekend and was the fastest to gross $150 million through $250 million. It also set several single-day records and had the widest PG-13 opening and release to date.

Record	Figure	Previous record holder	Surpassed by	Notes
Highest opening weekend and single weekend gross	$257 million	Star Wars: The Force Awakens – $247 million	Avengers: Endgame – $357 million	
Highest spring opening weekend gross	$257 million	Beauty and the Beast – $174 million	Avengers: Endgame – $357 million	
Highest April opening weekend gross	$257 million	Furious 7 – $147 million	Avengers: Endgame – $357 million	
Highest PG-13 rated opening weekend gross	$257 million	Star Wars: The Force Awakens – $247 million	Avengers: Endgame – $357 million	
Fastest to gross $150 million	2 days	Star Wars: The Force Awakens – 2 days	Avengers: Endgame – 1 day	It grossed $188 million in that time. The Force Awakens grossed $187 million.
Fastest to gross $200 million	3 days	Star Wars: The Force Awakens – 3 days	Avengers: Endgame – 2 days	It grossed $257 million in that time. The Force Awakens grossed $247 million.
Fastest to gross $250 million	3 days	Star Wars: The Force Awakens – 4 days	Avengers: Endgame – 2 days	It grossed $257 million in that time.
Highest April single-day gross	$106 million	Furious 7 – $67.4 million	Avengers: Endgame – $157 million	On Friday, April 27, 2018. For Furious 7, it was Friday, April 3, 2015. For Endgame, it was Friday, April 26, 2019. Infinity War also produced the second and third highest April single-day grosses the following two days.
Highest "pure Friday" gross (i.e. excluding Thursday previews)	$66.9 million	Jurassic World – $63.4 million	Avengers: Endgame – $96.7 million	On April 27, 2018. For Jurassic World, it was June 12, 2015. For Endgame, it was April 26, 2019.
Highest Saturday gross	$82.1 million	Jurassic World – $69.6 million	Avengers: Endgame – $109 million	On April 28, 2018. For Jurassic World, it was June 13, 2015. For Endgame, it was April 27, 2019.
Highest Saturday gross adjusted for inflation	est. 8.7 million tickets	The Avengers – est. 8.5 million tickets	Avengers: Endgame – est. 12.1 million tickets	On April 28, 2018. The Avengers' record was set on May 5, 2012. For Endgame, it was April 27, 2019.
Highest Sunday gross	$69.2 million	Star Wars: The Force Awakens – $60.5 million	Avengers: Endgame – $90.3 million	On April 29, 2018. For The Force Awakens, it was December 20, 2015. For Endgame, it was April 28, 2019.
Highest Sunday gross adjusted for inflation	est. 7.3 million tickets	The Avengers – est. 7.0 million tickets	Avengers: Endgame – est. 10.0 million tickets	On April 29, 2018. The Avengers' record was set on May 5, 2012. For Endgame, it was April 28, 2019.
Highest Monday gross in April	$25.2 million	Furious 7 – $14 million	Avengers: Endgame – $36.8 million	On April 30, 2018. For Furious 7, it was April 6, 2015. For Endgame, it was April 29, 2019.
Highest 3-day opening gross	$257 million	Star Wars: The Force Awakens – $247 million	Avengers: Endgame – $357 million	
Widest PG-13 opening	4,474 theaters	The Twilight Saga: Eclipse – 4,468 theaters	Jurassic World: Fallen Kingdom – 4,475 theaters	Also the second widest opening at the time after Despicable Me 3's 4,529 theaters.
Widest PG-13 release	4,474 theaters	The Twilight Saga: Eclipse – 4,468 theaters	Jurassic World: Fallen Kingdom – 4,485 theaters	Also the second widest release at the time after Despicable Me 3's 4,535 theaters.
Number one film of the highest-grossing single aggregated weekend	$314 million	December 18–20, 2015 – $313 million	April 26–28, 2019 – $402 million	The figure represents the combined gross of all movies in theaters on the weekend of April 27–29, 2018 of which Infinity War grossed $257 million (82.0%). Star Wars: The Force Awakens contributed $247 million (79.2%) to the previous record. Avengers: Endgame contributed $357 million (88.8%) to the one that surpassed it.
Largest gap between first and second highest-grossing films in a weekend	$246 million	Star Wars: The Force Awakens – $233 million	Avengers: Endgame – $348 million	The second-highest-grossing film on April 27–29, 2018 was A Quiet Place. For The Force Awakens (December 18–20, 2015), it was Alvin and the Chipmunks: The Road Chip. For Endgame (April 26–28, 2019), it was Captain Marvel.

== Other territories ==
Avengers: Infinity War grossed $1,369,544,272 outside the United States and Canada market. The film became the highest-grossing of all time in more than ten markets across Latin America and Asia. It also set various opening records in over 20 markets across all continents except Oceania and Antarctica. Data on precise figures, previous record holders, and surpassed records is limited due to the absence of box office record trackers for these markets.

Record	Territory	Figure	Previous record holder	Surpassed by	Notes
Highest-grossing film	Bolivia	$3.5 million	—N/a	Avengers: Endgame	
Highest-grossing film	Brazil	$66.6 million	—N/a	Avengers: Endgame – $72.5 million	
Highest-grossing film	Central America	$13.7 million	—N/a	—N/a	
Highest-grossing film	Chile	$14.6 million	—N/a	Avengers: Endgame	
Highest-grossing film	Ecuador	$7.3 million	—N/a	Avengers: Endgame	
Highest-grossing film	Indonesia	$25.2 million	—N/a	—N/a	
Highest-grossing film	Malaysia	$17.3 million	—N/a	—N/a	
Highest-grossing film	Mexico	$60.0 million	—N/a	Avengers: Endgame – $77.4 million	
Highest-grossing film	Mongolia	—N/a	—N/a	Avatar: The Way of Water	
Highest-grossing film	Peru	$11.1 million	—N/a	Avengers: Endgame	
Highest-grossing film	Philippines	$23.2 million	—N/a	—N/a	
Highest-grossing film	Singapore	$12.1 million	—N/a	Avengers: Endgame	
Highest-grossing film	Venezuela	$2.6 million	—N/a	—N/a	
Highest-grossing film	Vietnam	$8.2 million	—N/a	—N/a	
Highest opening weekend gross	Bolivia	$913 thousand	—N/a	Avengers: Endgame – $1.1 million	
Highest opening weekend gross	Brazil	$19.0 million	—N/a	Avengers: Endgame – $26.3 million	
Highest opening weekend gross	Central America	—N/a	—N/a	Avengers: Endgame	
Highest opening weekend gross	Chile	$4.5 million	—N/a	Avengers: Endgame –$6.5 million	
Highest opening weekend gross	China	$199 million	The Fate of the Furious – $184 million	The Wandering Earth – $300 million	In local currency, The Fate of the Furious had a larger opening gross in 2017 (RMB1.35 billion versus Infinity War's RMB1.26 billion), but due to RMB-USD parity fluctuations, Infinity War grossed $199 million versus Furious 8's $184 million.
Highest opening weekend gross	Ecuador	—N/a	The Fate of the Furious – $2.0 million	Avengers: Endgame	
Highest opening weekend gross	Hong Kong	$8.0 million	Avengers: Age of Ultron – $6.3 million	Avengers: Endgame – $12.6 million	
Highest opening weekend gross	Indonesia	$11.4 million	—N/a	Avengers: Endgame – $15.4 million	
Highest opening weekend gross	Malaysia	$8.4 million	—N/a	Avengers: Endgame – $10.0 million	
Highest opening weekend gross	Mexico	$25.1 million	Captain America: Civil War – $20.4 million	Avengers: Endgame – $31.9 million	
Highest opening weekend gross	Peru	—N/a	—N/a	Avengers: Endgame	
Highest opening weekend gross	Philippines	$12.5 million	—N/a	Avengers: Endgame – $17.9 million	
Highest opening weekend gross	Russia	$17.6 million	—N/a	—N/a	
Highest opening weekend gross	South Africa	$2.0 million	—N/a	Avengers: Endgame	
Highest opening weekend gross	South Korea	$39.1 million	The Admiral: Roaring Currents – $25.7 million	Avengers: Endgame	
Highest opening weekend gross	Thailand	$9.9 million	The Fate of the Furious – $4.9 million	Avengers: Endgame	
Highest opening weekend gross	United Arab Emirates	—N/a	—N/a	Avengers: Endgame	
Highest opening weekend gross	Venezuela	$1.7 million	—N/a	—N/a	
Highest opening weekend gross	Vietnam	—N/a	—N/a	Avengers: Endgame	
Highest opening weekend gross	West Africa	—N/a	—N/a	Avengers: Endgame	
Highest opening day gross	Bolivia	—N/a	—N/a	Avengers: Endgame	
Highest opening day gross	Brazil	$4.8 million	—N/a	Avengers: Endgame – $7 million	
Highest opening day gross	Central America	—N/a	—N/a	Avengers: Endgame	
Highest opening day gross	Chile	—N/a	Star Wars: The Force Awakens	Avengers: Endgame	
Highest opening day gross	Hong Kong	$1.4 million	—N/a	Avengers: Endgame – $2.7 million	
Highest opening day gross	Indonesia	$1.8 million	—N/a	Avengers: Endgame – $2.5 million	
Highest opening day gross	Malaysia	$1.5 million	—N/a	Avengers: Endgame – $2 million	
Highest opening day gross	Peru	—N/a	Star Wars: The Force Awakens	Avengers: Endgame	
Highest opening day gross	Philippines	$2.7 million	—N/a	Avengers: Endgame – $3.9 million	
Highest opening day gross	Russia	$4.9 million	—N/a	Avengers: Endgame – $7.8 million	
Highest opening day gross	South Korea	$6.5 million	—N/a	Jurassic World: Fallen Kingdom – $9.7 million	Gross from 980 thousand admissions. For Fallen Kingdom, it was from over 1 million admissions.
Highest opening day gross	Thailand	$1.8 million	—N/a	Avengers: Endgame – $2.4 million	
Highest opening day gross	United Arab Emirates	—N/a	—N/a	—N/a	
Highest opening day gross	Vietnam	$1.3 million	—N/a	Avengers: Endgame	
Highest-grossing Saturday	United Kingdom	—N/a	—N/a	—N/a	
Highest-grossing April opening day	France	$3.9 million	—N/a	—N/a	
Highest IMAX opening weekend gross	Brazil	—N/a	Star Wars: The Force Awakens	Avengers: Endgame	Infinity War set this record in 19 markets.
Highest IMAX opening weekend gross	China	$20.3 million	The Fate of the Furious – $13.3 million	Avengers: Endgame	Infinity War set this record in 19 markets.
Highest IMAX opening weekend gross	Italy	—N/a	Star Wars: The Last Jedi	Avengers: Endgame	Infinity War set this record in 19 markets.
Highest IMAX opening weekend gross	Korea	—N/a	—N/a	—N/a	Infinity War set this record in 19 markets.
Highest IMAX opening weekend gross	Mexico	—N/a	—N/a	Avengers: Endgame	Infinity War set this record in 19 markets.
Highest IMAX opening weekend gross	Russia	$2.2 million	Star Wars: The Force Awakens	—N/a	Infinity War set this record in 19 markets.
Highest IMAX opening weekend gross	United Arab Emirates	—N/a	The Fate of the Furious	Avengers: Endgame	Infinity War set this record in 19 markets.
Highest IMAX gross	China	>$40 million	—N/a	Avengers: Endgame – $76.2 million	It was the first movie to gross $40 million.
Highest-grossing superhero film	Outside the US and Canada market	$1.33 billion	Avengers: Age of Ultron – $949 million	Avengers: Endgame – $1.66 billion	
Highest-grossing foreign film	India	$43.5 million	—N/a	Avengers: Endgame – ₹4.1 billion ($57.16 million)	

== See also ==
- List of box office records set by Avengers: Endgame
- List of highest-grossing films
- List of fastest-grossing films
- United States box office records
