= List of box office records set by Avengers: Endgame =

The film's official logo

Avengers: Endgame is the fourth Avengers film and the 22nd film in the Marvel Cinematic Universe (MCU), released seven years after the first Avengers film and eleven years after the first MCU film. Directed by Anthony and Joe Russo, the film features an ensemble cast of actors reprising their roles from previous entries in the MCU.

Endgame was released on April 26, 2019, and went on to break numerous box office records in various markets. Worldwide, it set the record for highest-grossing film of all time, the highest opening weekend gross, and the fastest cumulative grosses through $2.5 billion. In its domestic market of the US and Canada, it set the records for the highest-grossing opening weekend, single day, Friday, Saturday, and Sunday as well as the fastest cumulative grosses through $650 million. Elsewhere, it became the highest-grossing film of all time in several markets including Chile and Thailand, set the record for highest opening weekend gross in more than 40 markets including Australia, Brazil, China, Egypt, Mexico, and the United Kingdom, and set various IMAX records in 50 different markets across all six inhabited continents. Many of the records set by the film are listed below. Data on the previous record and records that have since been surpassed are presented where available and applicable. All grosses are given in unadjusted US dollars, except where noted otherwise.

== Worldwide ==
Worldwide, Endgame grossed more money faster than any previous film. It also set the records for the highest-grossing opening weekend in total as well as in the IMAX and 3D formats.

Record	Figure	Previous record holder	Surpassed by	Notes
Highest-grossing film	$2.797 billion	Avatar – $2.789 billion	Avatar – $2.923 billion	Endgame became the highest-grossing movie in history on July 21, 2019, after 89 days of release, and had become the second-highest-grossing movie worldwide 12 days after its initial release. Avatar reclaimed the record in March 2021 after a re-release in China, and increased its gross further with additional subsequent re-releases.
Highest-grossing film	$2.925 billion	Avatar – $2.923 billion	—N/a	Endgame reclaimed the record in October 2026 with its global re-release, Avengers Endgame: Encore.
Highest-grossing superhero film	$2.797 billion	Avengers: Infinity War – $2.044 billion	—N/a	
Fastest to $500 million	3 days	Avengers: Infinity War – 5 days	—N/a	
Fastest to $1 billion	5 days	Avengers: Infinity War – 11 days	—N/a	
Fastest to $1.5 billion	8 days	Avengers: Infinity War – 18 days	—N/a	
Fastest to $2 billion	11 days	Avatar – 47 days	—N/a	
Fastest to $2.5 billion	20 days	Avatar – 72 days	—N/a	Endgame was released on April 24, 2019, and the gross as of May 13, 2019, was $1.7747 billion outside of the US and Canada and $728.4 million in the US and Canada for a worldwide gross of $2.503 billion. Avatar was released on December 16, 2009. Outside of the US and Canada, the gross was $1.839 billion as of February 28, 2010, and the weekend gross for February 26–28, 2010 was $30.6 million, giving a gross of $1,808.4 million as of February 25, 2010. Adding to that the US and Canada gross of $692.9 million as of February 25, 2010, gives a worldwide gross of $2.501 billion as of February 25, 2010.
Highest opening weekend gross	$1.223 billion	Avengers: Infinity War – $640 million	—N/a	
Highest IMAX opening weekend gross	$91.5 million	Star Wars: The Force Awakens – $48 million	—N/a	
Highest IMAX second weekend gross	$36.7 million	—N/a	The Odyssey – $48 million	
Highest 3D opening weekend gross	$540 million	Avengers: Infinity War – $366 million	—N/a	
Highest initial release gross	$2.75 billion	Avatar – $2.749 billion	—N/a	

== United States and Canada ==
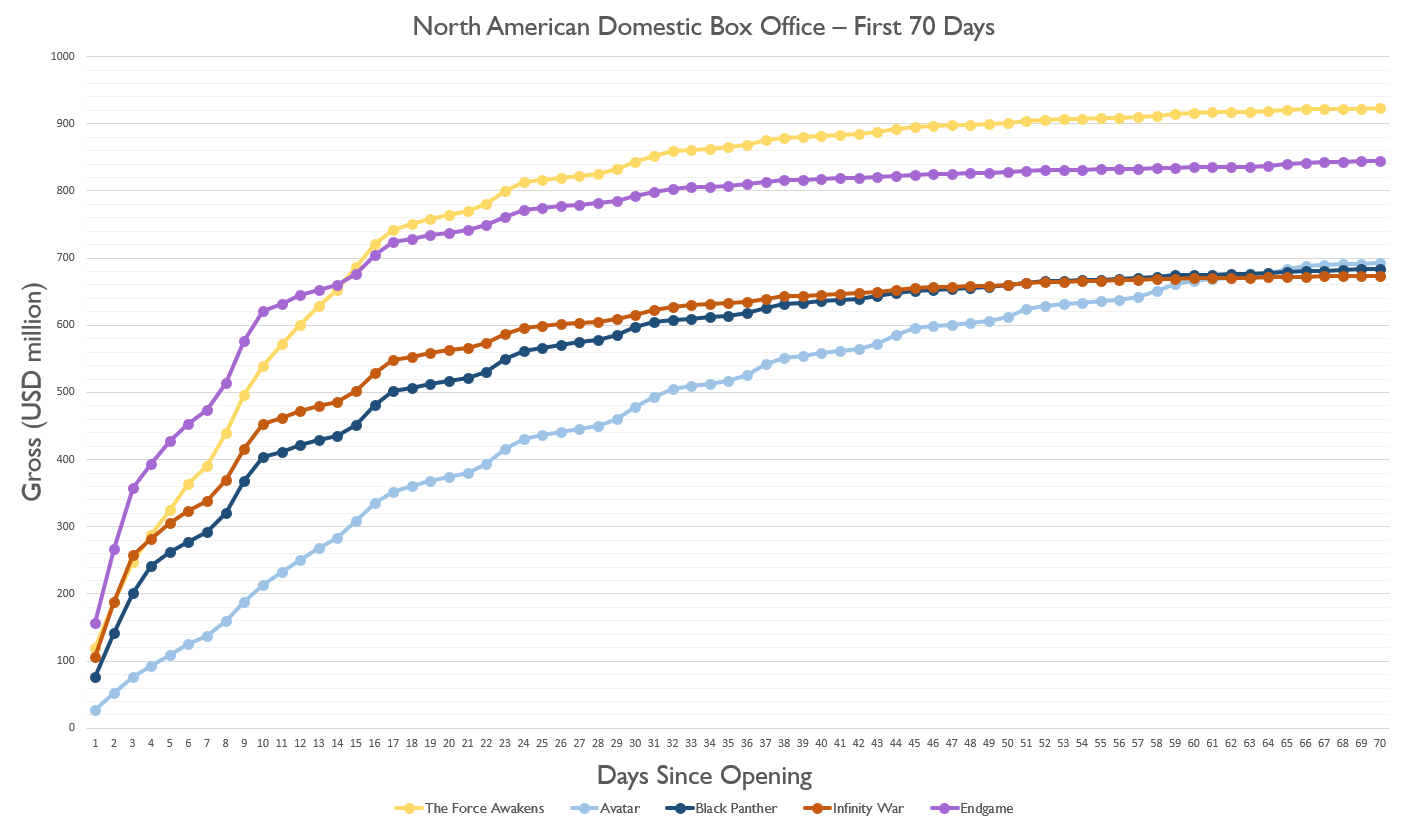
Chart of the North American box office gross of Avengers: Endgame against the four highest-grossing films in the market up to that time.

In its domestic market of the US and Canada, Endgame set records for highest-grossing opening weekend and the fastest cumulative grosses through $650 million. It also set several single-day records and had the widest opening and release to date.

Record	Figure	Previous record holder	Surpassed by	Notes
Fastest to $100 million	17 hours	Star Wars: The Force Awakens – 21 hours	—N/a	Endgame grossed $103 million in that time.
Fastest to $150 million	1 day	Avengers: Infinity War – 2 days	Spider-Man: Brand New Day – 1 day	Endgame grossed $157 million in that time. Brand New Day grossed $169 million.
Fastest to $200 million	2 days	Avengers: Infinity War – 3 days	Spider-Man: Brand New Day – 2 days	Endgame grossed $266 million in that time. Brand New Day grossed $271 million.
Fastest to $250 million	2 days	Avengers: Infinity War – 3 days	Spider-Man: Brand New Day – 2 days	Endgame grossed $266 million in that time. Brand New Day grossed $271 million.
Fastest to $300 million	3 days	Star Wars: The Force Awakens – 5 days	Spider-Man: Brand New Day – 3 days	Endgame grossed $357 million in that time. Brand New Day grossed $360 million.
Fastest to $350 million	3 days	Star Wars: The Force Awakens – 6 days	Spider-Man: Brand New Day – 3 days	Endgame grossed $357 million in that time. Brand New Day grossed $360 million.
Fastest to $400 million	5 days	Star Wars: The Force Awakens – 8 days	Spider-Man: Brand New Day – 4 days	Endgame grossed $427 million in that time.
Fastest to $450 million	6 days	Star Wars: The Force Awakens – 9 days	Spider-Man: Brand New Day – 6 days	Endgame grossed $452 million in that time. Brand New Day grossed $481 million.
Fastest to $500 million	8 days	Star Wars: The Force Awakens – 10 days	Spider-Man: Brand New Day – 7 days	Endgame grossed $514 million in that time.
Fastest to $550 million	9 days	Star Wars: The Force Awakens – 11 days	Spider-Man: Brand New Day – 8 days	Endgame grossed $576 million in that time.
Fastest to $600 million	10 days	Star Wars: The Force Awakens – 12 days	Spider-Man: Brand New Day – 9 days	Endgame grossed $621 million in that time.
Fastest to $650 million	13 days	Star Wars: The Force Awakens – 14 days	Spider-Man: Brand New Day – 10 days	Endgame grossed $652 million in that time.
Highest opening weekend gross	$357 million	Avengers: Infinity War – $257 million	Spider-Man: Brand New Day – $360 million	
Highest opening weekend gross adjusted for inflation	est. 39.6 million tickets	Star Wars: The Force Awakens – est. 28.5 million tickets	—N/a	
Highest weekend per-theater average for a wide release	$76.6 thousand	Star Wars: The Force Awakens – $59.9 thousand	Spider-Man: Brand New Day – $80.2 thousand	
Highest weekend per-theater average for a wide release adjusted for inflation	est. 8,502 tickets	Return of the Jedi – est. 7,293 tickets	—N/a	
Highest opening week gross	$473 million	Star Wars: The Force Awakens – $390 million	Spider-Man: Brand New Day – $510 million	
Highest single-day gross	$157 million	Star Wars: The Force Awakens – $119 million	Spider-Man: Brand New Day – $169 million	On Friday, April 26, 2019. For The Force Awakens, it was Friday, December 18, 2015. For Brand New Day, it was Friday, July 31, 2026.
Highest opening day gross	$157 million	Star Wars: The Force Awakens – $119 million	Spider-Man: Brand New Day – $169 million	
Highest Friday gross	$157 million	Star Wars: The Force Awakens – $119 million	Spider-Man: Brand New Day – $169 million	
Highest Saturday gross	$109 million	Avengers: Infinity War – $82.1 million	—N/a	On April 27, 2019. For Infinity War, it was April 28, 2018.
Highest Sunday gross	$90.3 million	Avengers: Infinity War – $69.2 million	—N/a	On April 28, 2019. For Infinity War, it was April 29, 2018.
Highest previews gross	$60 million	Star Wars: The Force Awakens – $57 million	Spider-Man: Brand New Day – $72 million	
Highest "pure Friday" gross (i.e. excluding Thursday previews)	$97.4 million	Avengers: Infinity War – $66.9 million	Spider-Man: Brand New Day – $97.8 million	
Widest opening	4,662 theaters	Despicable Me 3 – 4,529 theaters	The Lion King – 4,725 theaters	
Widest release	4,662 theaters	Despicable Me 3 – 4,535 theaters	The Lion King – 4,802 theaters	
Widest PG-13 opening	4,662 theaters	Jurassic World: Fallen Kingdom – 4,475 theaters	Top Gun: Maverick – 4,735 theaters	
Widest PG-13 release	4,662 theaters	Jurassic World: Fallen Kingdom – 4,485 theaters	Top Gun: Maverick – 4,751 theaters	
Number one film of the highest-grossing single aggregated weekend	$401 million	December 18–20, 2015 – $313 million	July 31 – August 2, 2026 – $436 million	The figure represents the combined gross of all movies in theaters on the weekend of April 26–28, 2019 of which Endgame grossed $357 million (88.9%). Star Wars: The Force Awakens contributed $247 million (79.2%) to the previous record. Spider-Man: Brand New Day contributed $360 million (82.5%) to the record that succeeded it.
Largest gap between first and second highest-grossing films in a weekend	$348 million	Avengers: Infinity War – $246 million	—N/a	The second-highest-grossing film on April 26–28, 2019 was Captain Marvel. For Infinity War (April 27–29, 2018), it was A Quiet Place.
Largest relative gap between first and second highest-grossing films in a weekend	43.0 times higher gross	Avengers: Age of Ultron – 28.8 times higher gross	—N/a	The second-highest-grossing film opening on April 26–28, 2019 was Captain Marvel. For Age of Ultron (May 1–3, 2015), it was Furious 7.
Highest market share in a weekend	89.7%	Avengers: Age of Ultron – 84.5%	—N/a	

== Other territories ==
The film became the highest-grossing film in several markets in South America and Asia. It also set various opening records in over 50 markets across all six continents (not counting Antarctica). Data on precise figures, previous record holders, and surpassed records is limited due to the absence of box office record trackers for these markets.

Record	Territory	Figure	Previous record holder	Surpassed by	Notes
Highest-grossing film	Bolivia	$3.6 million	Avengers: Infinity War – $3.1 million	—N/a	
Highest-grossing film	Brazil	$85.6 million	Avengers: Infinity War – $66.6 million	—N/a	
Highest-grossing film	Chile	$18.8 million	Avengers: Infinity War – $14.6 million	—N/a	
Highest-grossing film	Ecuador	—N/a	Avengers: Infinity War	—N/a	
Highest-grossing film	Hong Kong	$29.3 million	Avatar – $22.9 million	—N/a	
Highest-grossing film	Mexico	$77.4 million	Avengers: Infinity War – $60.0 million	Spider-Man: No Way Home	
Highest-grossing film	Peru	—N/a	Avengers: Infinity War	—N/a	
Highest-grossing film	Philippines	$32.8 million	Avengers: Infinity War – $23.3 million	—N/a	
Highest-grossing film	Singapore	$14.3 million	Avengers: Infinity War – $12.1 million	—N/a	
Highest-grossing film	Thailand	$27.0 million	—N/a	—N/a	
Highest-grossing film	Uruguay	—N/a	—N/a	—N/a	
Highest opening weekend gross	Argentina	$6.8 million	The Fate of the Furious	—N/a	Endgame set this record in at least 44 markets.
Highest opening weekend gross	Australia	$30.8 million	Star Wars: The Force Awakens – $19.6 million	—N/a	Endgame set this record in at least 44 markets.
Highest opening weekend gross	Austria	$3.5 million	Star Wars: The Force Awakens – $1.9 million	—N/a	Endgame set this record in at least 44 markets.
Highest opening weekend gross	Bahrain	—N/a	—N/a	—N/a	Endgame set this record in at least 44 markets.
Highest opening weekend gross	Bangladesh	Taka ৳30 million	—N/a	—N/a	Endgame set this record in at least 44 markets.
Highest opening weekend gross	Belgium	$3.1 million	The Twilight Saga: Breaking Dawn – Part 2 – $2.9 million	Spider-Man: Brand New Day – $4 million	Endgame set this record in at least 44 markets.
Highest opening weekend gross	Bolivia	$1.1 million	Avengers: Infinity War – $913 thousand	—N/a	Endgame set this record in at least 44 markets.
Highest opening weekend gross	Bosnia and Herzegovina	—N/a	—N/a	—N/a	Endgame set this record in at least 44 markets.
Highest opening weekend gross	Brazil	$26.3 million	Avengers: Infinity War – $19.0 million	Spider-Man: Brand New Day	Endgame set this record in at least 44 markets.
Highest opening weekend gross	Central America	—N/a	Avengers: Infinity War	—N/a	Endgame set this record in at least 44 markets.
Highest opening weekend gross	Chile	$6.5 million	Avengers: Infinity War – $4.5 million	Spider-Man: Brand New Day	Endgame set this record in at least 44 markets.
Highest opening weekend gross	China	CN¥2.22 billion ($330 million)	The Wandering Earth – CN¥2.02 billion ($300 million)	—N/a	Endgame set this record in at least 44 markets.
Highest opening weekend gross	Colombia	$6.1 million	The Fate of the Furious – $4.7 million	—N/a	Endgame set this record in at least 44 markets.
Highest opening weekend gross	Croatia	$545 thousand	Star Wars: The Force Awakens	—N/a	Endgame set this record in at least 44 markets.
Highest opening weekend gross	Czech Republic	$2.5 million	Star Wars: The Force Awakens – $1.5 million	—N/a	Endgame set this record in at least 44 markets.
Highest opening weekend gross	Denmark	$4.2 million	Star Wars: The Force Awakens	—N/a	Endgame set this record in at least 44 markets.
Highest opening weekend gross	East Africa	—N/a	Black Panther	—N/a	Endgame set this record in at least 44 markets.
Highest opening weekend gross	Ecuador	—N/a	Avengers: Infinity War	—N/a	Endgame set this record in at least 44 markets.
Highest opening weekend gross	Egypt	—N/a	The Fate of the Furious	—N/a	Endgame set this record in at least 44 markets.
Highest opening weekend gross	Hong Kong	$12.6 million	Avengers: Infinity War – $8.0 million	—N/a	Endgame set this record in at least 44 markets.
Highest opening weekend gross	Hungary	$1.8 million	Star Wars: The Last Jedi – $1.5 million	—N/a	Endgame set this record in at least 44 markets.
Highest opening weekend gross	Iceland	$210 thousand	—N/a	—N/a	Endgame set this record in at least 44 markets.
Highest opening weekend gross	Ireland	€4.4 million	Beauty and the Beast	—N/a	Endgame set this record in at least 44 markets.
Highest opening weekend gross	Indonesia	$15.4 million	Avengers: Infinity War – $11.4 million	—N/a	Endgame set this record in at least 44 markets.
Highest opening weekend gross	Jordan	—N/a	—N/a	—N/a	Endgame set this record in at least 44 markets.
Highest opening weekend gross	Malaysia	$10.0 million	Avengers: Infinity War – $8.3 million	—N/a	Endgame set this record in at least 44 markets.
Highest opening weekend gross	Mexico	$31.9 million	Avengers: Infinity War – $25.3 million	—N/a	Endgame set this record in at least 44 markets.
Highest opening weekend gross	Middle East	—N/a	The Fate of the Furious	—N/a	Endgame set this record in at least 44 markets.
Highest opening weekend gross	The Netherlands	$5.9 million	Harry Potter and the Deathly Hallows – Part 2 – $3.8 million	—N/a	Endgame set this record in at least 44 markets.
Highest opening weekend gross	New Zealand	$4.0 million	Star Wars: The Force Awakens – $3.0 million	—N/a	Endgame set this record in at least 44 markets.
Highest opening weekend gross	Norway	$2.5 million	Star Wars: The Force Awakens	—N/a	Endgame set this record in at least 44 markets.
Highest opening weekend gross	Pakistan	Rs. 14.5 crore	Sultan – Rs. 11.25 crore	—N/a	Endgame set this record in at least 44 markets.
Highest opening weekend gross	Paraguay	$624 thousand	The Fate of the Furious	—N/a	Endgame set this record in at least 44 markets.
Highest opening weekend gross	Peru	—N/a	Avengers: Infinity War	Spider-Man: Brand New Day – $8.6 million	Endgame set this record in at least 44 markets.
Highest opening weekend gross	Philippines	$17.9 million	Avengers: Infinity War – $12.5 million	—N/a	Endgame set this record in at least 44 markets.
Highest opening weekend gross	Qatar	—N/a	—N/a	—N/a	Endgame set this record in at least 44 markets.
Highest opening weekend gross	Saudi Arabia	—N/a	—N/a	—N/a	Endgame set this record in at least 44 markets.
Highest opening weekend gross	Serbia	$410 thousand	Star Wars: The Force Awakens	—N/a	Endgame set this record in at least 44 markets.
Highest opening weekend gross	Singapore	$5.5 million	—N/a	—N/a	Endgame set this record in at least 44 markets.
Highest opening weekend gross	Slovakia	$847 thousand	Fifty Shades of Grey – $621 thousand	—N/a	Endgame set this record in at least 44 markets.
Highest opening weekend gross	Slovenia	$237 thousand	Fifty Shades of Grey	—N/a	Endgame set this record in at least 44 markets.
Highest opening weekend gross	Southern Africa	$2.3 million	Avengers: Infinity War – $2.0 million	—N/a	Endgame set this record in at least 44 markets.
Highest opening weekend gross	South Korea	$46.9 million	Avengers: Infinity War – $39.1 million	—N/a	Endgame set this record in at least 44 markets.
Highest opening weekend gross	Spain	$13.3 million	—N/a	Spider-Man: Brand New Day – $15.6 million	Endgame set this record in at least 44 markets.
Highest opening weekend gross	Syria	—N/a	—N/a	—N/a	Endgame set this record in at least 44 markets.
Highest opening weekend gross	Taiwan	$12.8 million	Iron Man 3	—N/a	Endgame set this record in at least 44 markets.
Highest opening weekend gross	Thailand	$14.1 million	Avengers: Infinity War – $9.9 million	—N/a	Endgame set this record in at least 44 markets.
Highest opening weekend gross	Trinidad	—N/a	Black Panther – $700 thousand	—N/a	Endgame set this record in at least 44 markets.
Highest opening weekend gross	Turkey	—N/a	—N/a	Spider-Man: Brand New Day – $4.7 million	Endgame set this record in at least 44 markets.
Highest opening weekend gross	Ukraine	$1.9 million	Star Wars: The Force Awakens – $1.1 million	—N/a	Endgame set this record in at least 44 markets.
Highest opening weekend gross	United Arab Emirates	$5.9 million	Avengers: Infinity War	Spider-Man: Brand New Day – $6.8 million	Endgame set this record in at least 44 markets.
Highest opening weekend gross	United Kingdom	£43.4 million	Spectre – £41.3 million	—N/a	Endgame set this record in at least 44 markets.
Highest opening weekend gross	Uruguay	$594 thousand	The Fate of the Furious – $590 thousand	—N/a	Endgame set this record in at least 44 markets.
Highest opening weekend gross	Vietnam	₫112.4 billion	Kong: Skull Island – ₫59.27 billion	—N/a	Endgame set this record in at least 44 markets.
Highest opening weekend gross	West Africa	—N/a	Black Panther	—N/a	Endgame set this record in at least 44 markets.
Highest opening day gross	Argentina	—N/a	—N/a	—N/a	
Highest opening day gross	Australia	$7 million	Star Wars: The Force Awakens – $6.8 million	—N/a	
Highest opening day gross	Bolivia	—N/a	Avengers: Infinity War	—N/a	
Highest opening day gross	Bosnia and Herzegovina	—N/a	Star Wars: The Last Jedi	—N/a	
Highest opening day gross	Brazil	$7 million	Avengers: Infinity War – $4.8 million	—N/a	
Highest opening day gross	Central America	—N/a	Avengers: Infinity War	—N/a	
Highest opening day gross	Chile	—N/a	Avengers: Infinity War	—N/a	
Highest opening day gross	China	CN¥719 million (US$107.2 million)	Monster Hunt 2 – CN¥547 million	—N/a	Includes previews. Also the highest single-day gross excluding previews – CN¥550 million (US$81.7 million).
Highest opening day gross	Colombia	—N/a	—N/a	—N/a	
Highest opening day gross	Czech Republic	—N/a	—N/a	—N/a	
Highest opening day gross	East Africa	—N/a	—N/a	—N/a	
Highest opening day gross	Ecuador	—N/a	—N/a	—N/a	
Highest opening day gross	Egypt	—N/a	—N/a	—N/a	
Highest opening day gross	Greece	—N/a	—N/a	—N/a	
Highest opening day gross	Hong Kong	$2.7 million	Avengers: Infinity War – $1.4 million	—N/a	
Highest opening day gross	Hungary	—N/a	Star Wars: The Last Jedi	—N/a	
Highest opening day gross	Indonesia	$2.5 million	Avengers: Infinity War – $1.8 million	—N/a	
Highest opening day gross	Korea	—N/a	—N/a	—N/a	
Highest opening day gross	Malaysia	$2 million	Avengers: Infinity War – $1.5 million	—N/a	
Highest opening day gross	Mexico	$12.5 million	—N/a	—N/a	
Highest opening day gross	The Netherlands	—N/a	Star Wars: The Last Jedi	—N/a	
Highest opening day gross	New Zealand	—N/a	Star Wars: The Force Awakens	—N/a	
Highest opening day gross	Pakistan	Rs. 4.55 crore	Sultan – Rs. 3.42 crore	—N/a	
Highest opening day gross	Panama	—N/a	Jurassic World	—N/a	
Highest opening day gross	Paraguay	—N/a	—N/a	—N/a	
Highest opening day gross	Peru	—N/a	Avengers: Infinity War	—N/a	
Highest opening day gross	Philippines	₱205 million ($3.9 million)	Avengers: Infinity War – $2.7 million	—N/a	
Highest opening day gross	Portugal	—N/a	—N/a	—N/a	
Highest opening day gross	Russia	$7.8 million	Avengers: Infinity War – $4.9 million	—N/a	
Highest opening day gross	Singapore	$7.5 million	Avengers: Infinity War – $6.1 million	—N/a	
Highest opening day gross	Slovakia	—N/a	Star Wars: The Force Awakens	—N/a	
Highest opening day gross	Southern Africa	—N/a	—N/a	—N/a	
Highest opening day gross	Spain	—N/a	Star Wars: The Last Jedi	—N/a	
Highest opening day gross	Taiwan	$2.6 million	—N/a	—N/a	
Highest opening day gross	Thailand	$2.4 million	Avengers: Infinity War – $1.8 million	—N/a	
Highest opening day gross	Trinidad	—N/a	—N/a	—N/a	
Highest opening day gross	Turkey	₺6.0 million	Arif V 216 – ₺5.0 million	—N/a	
Highest opening day gross	Ukraine	—N/a	Star Wars: The Force Awakens	—N/a	
Highest opening day gross	United Kingdom	$15.3 million	Star Wars: The Force Awakens – $14.3 million	—N/a	
Highest opening day gross	Uruguay	—N/a	—N/a	—N/a	
Highest opening day gross	Vietnam	₫30.7 billion	Captain Marvel – ₫19.5 billion	—N/a	
Highest opening day gross	West Africa	—N/a	—N/a	—N/a	
Highest IMAX gross	Outside of the US and Canada	$150 million	—N/a	Avatar: The Way of Water – $156.1 million	Endgame set this record in at least 25 markets.
Highest IMAX gross	Argentina	—N/a	—N/a	—N/a	Endgame set this record in at least 25 markets.
Highest IMAX gross	Belgium	—N/a	—N/a	—N/a	Endgame set this record in at least 25 markets.
Highest IMAX gross	China	$81.2 million	Avengers: Infinity War	—N/a	Endgame set this record in at least 25 markets.
Highest IMAX gross	India	—N/a	—N/a	—N/a	Endgame set this record in at least 25 markets.
Highest IMAX gross	Italy	—N/a	—N/a	—N/a	Endgame set this record in at least 25 markets.
Highest IMAX gross	Mexico	—N/a	—N/a	—N/a	Endgame set this record in at least 25 markets.
Highest IMAX opening weekend gross	Argentina	—N/a	The Fate of the Furious	—N/a	Endgame set this record in 50 markets.
Highest IMAX opening weekend gross	Austria	—N/a	Star Wars: The Force Awakens	—N/a	Endgame set this record in 50 markets.
Highest IMAX opening weekend gross	Bahrain	—N/a	Star Wars: The Force Awakens	—N/a	Endgame set this record in 50 markets.
Highest IMAX opening weekend gross	Belgium	—N/a	Star Wars: The Last Jedi	—N/a	Endgame set this record in 50 markets.
Highest IMAX opening weekend gross	Brazil	—N/a	Avengers: Infinity War	—N/a	Endgame set this record in 50 markets.
Highest IMAX opening weekend gross	Bulgaria	—N/a	Star Wars: The Force Awakens	—N/a	Endgame set this record in 50 markets.
Highest IMAX opening weekend gross	Cambodia	—N/a	—N/a	—N/a	Endgame set this record in 50 markets.
Highest IMAX opening weekend gross	Chile	—N/a	Star Wars: The Force Awakens	—N/a	Endgame set this record in 50 markets.
Highest IMAX opening weekend gross	China	$42.4 million	Avengers: Infinity War – $20.3 million	—N/a	Endgame set this record in 50 markets.
Highest IMAX opening weekend gross	Colombia	—N/a	—N/a	—N/a	Endgame set this record in 50 markets.
Highest IMAX opening weekend gross	Costa Rica	—N/a	Star Wars: The Force Awakens	—N/a	Endgame set this record in 50 markets.
Highest IMAX opening weekend gross	Czech Republic	—N/a	—N/a	—N/a	Endgame set this record in 50 markets.
Highest IMAX opening weekend gross	Dominican Republic	—N/a	—N/a	—N/a	Endgame set this record in 50 markets.
Highest IMAX opening weekend gross	Ecuador	—N/a	—N/a	—N/a	Endgame set this record in 50 markets.
Highest IMAX opening weekend gross	Finland	—N/a	—N/a	—N/a	Endgame set this record in 50 markets.
Highest IMAX opening weekend gross	France	—N/a	Star Wars: The Last Jedi	—N/a	Endgame set this record in 50 markets.
Highest IMAX opening weekend gross	Germany	—N/a	Captain Marvel	—N/a	Endgame set this record in 50 markets.
Highest IMAX opening weekend gross	Greece	—N/a	—N/a	—N/a	Endgame set this record in 50 markets.
Highest IMAX opening weekend gross	Guatemala	—N/a	—N/a	—N/a	Endgame set this record in 50 markets.
Highest IMAX opening weekend gross	Hong Kong	—N/a	—N/a	—N/a	Endgame set this record in 50 markets.
Highest IMAX opening weekend gross	India	—N/a	Captain Marvel	—N/a	Endgame set this record in 50 markets.
Highest IMAX opening weekend gross	Israel	—N/a	Star Wars: The Force Awakens	—N/a	Endgame set this record in 50 markets.
Highest IMAX opening weekend gross	Italy	—N/a	Avengers: Infinity War	—N/a	Endgame set this record in 50 markets.
Highest IMAX opening weekend gross	Japan	—N/a	Star Wars: The Last Jedi	—N/a	Endgame set this record in 50 markets.
Highest IMAX opening weekend gross	Latvia	—N/a	—N/a	—N/a	Endgame set this record in 50 markets.
Highest IMAX opening weekend gross	Lebanon	—N/a	—N/a	—N/a	Endgame set this record in 50 markets.
Highest IMAX opening weekend gross	Malaysia	—N/a	—N/a	—N/a	Endgame set this record in 50 markets.
Highest IMAX opening weekend gross	Mexico	—N/a	Avengers: Infinity War	—N/a	Endgame set this record in 50 markets.
Highest IMAX opening weekend gross	Mongolia	—N/a	—N/a	—N/a	Endgame set this record in 50 markets.
Highest IMAX opening weekend gross	New Zealand	—N/a	Star Wars: The Force Awakens	—N/a	Endgame set this record in 50 markets.
Highest IMAX opening weekend gross	Nigeria	—N/a	—N/a	—N/a	Endgame set this record in 50 markets.
Highest IMAX opening weekend gross	Norway	—N/a	—N/a	—N/a	Endgame set this record in 50 markets.
Highest IMAX opening weekend gross	Oman	—N/a	—N/a	—N/a	Endgame set this record in 50 markets.
Highest IMAX opening weekend gross	Pakistan	—N/a	—N/a	—N/a	Endgame set this record in 50 markets.
Highest IMAX opening weekend gross	Panama	—N/a	—N/a	—N/a	Endgame set this record in 50 markets.
Highest IMAX opening weekend gross	Philippines	—N/a	—N/a	—N/a	Endgame set this record in 50 markets.
Highest IMAX opening weekend gross	Portugal	—N/a	Star Wars: The Force Awakens	—N/a	Endgame set this record in 50 markets.
Highest IMAX opening weekend gross	Puerto Rico	—N/a	Captain Marvel	—N/a	Endgame set this record in 50 markets.
Highest IMAX opening weekend gross	Qatar	—N/a	—N/a	—N/a	Endgame set this record in 50 markets.
Highest IMAX opening weekend gross	Saudi Arabia	—N/a	—N/a	—N/a	Endgame set this record in 50 markets.
Highest IMAX opening weekend gross	Singapore	—N/a	Star Wars: The Force Awakens	—N/a	Endgame set this record in 50 markets.
Highest IMAX opening weekend gross	Slovakia	—N/a	—N/a	—N/a	Endgame set this record in 50 markets.
Highest IMAX opening weekend gross	Southern Africa	—N/a	Star Wars: The Force Awakens	—N/a	Endgame set this record in 50 markets.
Highest IMAX opening weekend gross	Switzerland	—N/a	Star Wars: The Force Awakens	—N/a	Endgame set this record in 50 markets.
Highest IMAX opening weekend gross	Taiwan	—N/a	—N/a	—N/a	Endgame set this record in 50 markets.
Highest IMAX opening weekend gross	Thailand	—N/a	—N/a	—N/a	Endgame set this record in 50 markets.
Highest IMAX opening weekend gross	Turkey	—N/a	Star Wars: The Force Awakens	—N/a	Endgame set this record in 50 markets.
Highest IMAX opening weekend gross	Ukraine	—N/a	Captain Marvel	—N/a	Endgame set this record in 50 markets.
Highest IMAX opening weekend gross	United Arab Emirates	—N/a	Avengers: Infinity War	—N/a	Endgame set this record in 50 markets.
Highest IMAX opening weekend gross	Vietnam	—N/a	—N/a	—N/a	Endgame set this record in 50 markets.
Highest IMAX opening day gross	Argentina	—N/a	—N/a	—N/a	
Highest IMAX opening day gross	Brazil	—N/a	Star Wars: The Force Awakens	—N/a	
Highest IMAX opening day gross	China	CN¥93 million (US$13.8 million)	Avengers: Infinity War	—N/a	
Highest IMAX opening day gross	France	—N/a	—N/a	—N/a	
Highest IMAX opening day gross	Germany	—N/a	Star Wars: The Force Awakens	—N/a	
Highest IMAX opening day gross	India	—N/a	—N/a	—N/a	
Highest IMAX opening day gross	Italy	—N/a	—N/a	—N/a	
Highest IMAX opening day gross	Japan	—N/a	—N/a	—N/a	
Highest IMAX opening day gross	Mexico	—N/a	Star Wars: The Force Awakens	—N/a	
Highest IMAX opening day gross	Taiwan	—N/a	—N/a	—N/a	
Highest IMAX opening day gross	United Arab Emirates	—N/a	Star Wars: The Force Awakens	—N/a	
Highest midnight previews gross	China	CN¥189 million (US$28.2 million)	The Fate of the Furious – $9.1 million	—N/a	
Highest pre-sales gross	China	$110 million	Monster Hunt 2 – $59.6 million	—N/a	

== See also ==
- List of box office records set by Avengers: Infinity War
- List of highest-grossing films
- List of fastest-grossing films
- List of highest-grossing superhero films
- United States box office records
