= Central America (disambiguation) =

Central America is a central region of the Americas, sometimes including the Caribbean, sometimes considered part of North America.

Central America or Central American may also refer to:

== Central America ==
- Central America bioregion
- Central American Integration System, the supranational organization of Central America
  - Central American Parliament, the governing body of the supranational organization
- SS Central America, a steamship which sailed along the American coasts in the 1850s and sank in 1857
- Central America (game), a boardgame
- Central United States, a region of the United States of America

=== Former countries ===
- Federal Republic of Central America (1823–1841), also known as the United Provinces of Central America, comprising Costa Rica, El Salvador, Guatemala, Honduras, Los Altos (now Chiapas), and Nicaragua
- Greater Republic of Central America (1896–1898), comprising El Salvador, Honduras, and Nicaragua
- Federation of Central America (1921–1922), comprising El Salvador, Guatemala, and Honduras

== Central American ==
- North-Central American English, a dialect of American English
- Central American Spanish, a dialect of Spanish found in Central America
- Central American Games, multisport quadrennial region championship for the members of the Central American Sports Organization
- Central American Seaway, a natural waterway that separated South and North America before the Isthmus of Panama existed
- Central American Adventist University, in Costa Rica
- Central American University, San Salvador, in El Salvador
- Central American University, Managua, in Nicaragua

== Other uses ==
- Central American campaign (disambiguation)
- Central American Championships (disambiguation)

== See also ==
- History of Central America
- Americas (terminology)
- Mesoamerica (disambiguation)
- Middle America (disambiguation)
- North America (disambiguation)
- Caribbean (disambiguation)
- America (disambiguation)
