= Middle America =

Middle America may refer to:

- Middle America (Americas), a region in the mid-latitudes in the Americas
- Middle America (United States), a region of the United States representing the country's interior and non-urban "heartland"
- American middle class, a social class in the United States
- Midwestern United States, region representing the north-central parts of the United States
- "Middle America" (song), a song by Stephen Malkmus and the Jicks

== See also ==
- Central America (disambiguation)
- Mesoamerica (disambiguation)
- Heartland (United States)
- Kalinago
- Caribbean
- Grenada
