= Northern American =

Northern American may refer to:

- an attribute of Northern America, the northerly region of the Americas
- Northern American English, a variant of English in North America

== See also ==
- Northern America (disambiguation)
- North American (disambiguation)
- North America
