= Mesoamerica (disambiguation) =

Mesoamerica (lit. "mid/middle America") is a historical region and cultural area in southern North America and most of Central America.

Mesoamerica(n) or Meso-America(n) may also refer to:

- Mesoamerican language area, a linguistic area or sprachbund comprising numerous indigenous languages in Mesoamerica that exhibit certain similarities
- Mesoamerican Barrier Reef System, system of coral reefs in the Caribbean Sea along the coast of Yucatán and Central America
- Mesoamerican Biological Corridor, a biodiversity conservation initiative formed in 1997 to interconnect a number of protected areas in Mesoamerica
- Mesoamerican region, a trans-national economic territory comprising Central America and the southeastern states of Mexico
- Universidad Mesoamericana, a university in Guatemala with campuses in Guatemala City and Quetzaltenango

== See also ==
- Mexico
- Americas (terminology)
- Central America (disambiguation)
- Middle America (disambiguation)
