= North American (disambiguation) =

North American describes any entity, people, group, or attribute of North Americans, especially of the United States and Canada together.

North Americans or North American may also refer to:

== Culture ==
- North American English, all American English and Canadian English dialects

== Institutions ==
- North American Aviation, Inc., an aircraft manufacturer from 1928 to 1967
- North American Company, a former holding company for public utilities broken up in the 1940s
- North American Airlines, an airline based in New York, NY
- North American Division of Seventh-day Adventists, a subdivision of the Adventist World Church comprising the United States, Canada and Bermuda

== Media ==
- North America (TV series), American miniseries
- The North American, American newspaper published 1839 to 1925
- North American Review, American literary magazine
- North America, a box office territory comprising the United States and Canada

== Other ==
- SS North American, steamship built in 1913

== See also ==
- Northern American (disambiguation)
- Northern America (disambiguation)
- Northern United States
