= Northern America (disambiguation) =

Northern America may refer to:

- Northern America, a northerly region of the Americas.
- Northern America (WGSRPD), the botanical continent defined in the World Geographical Scheme for Recording Plant Distributions
- An English translation of Mexico's first official name (América Septentrional), so entitled in the Solemn Act of the Declaration of Independence of Northern America — see Toponymy of Mexico.
- Northern Tier (United States), a region of the lower 48 of the United States of America near the Canada–United States border.

== See also ==
- Northern American (disambiguation)
- North American (disambiguation)
- North America
- Americas (terminology)
- Northern United States
