= Central American campaign =

The Central American campaign may refer to:

- The Central American campaign of the Anglo-Spanish War
- The Filibuster War
