= Kelly C. Crabb =

American lawyer (1946–2019)

Kelly Charles Crabb (November 8, 1946 – October 27, 2019) was an American lawyer who specialized in media and entertainment issues. He served as the chief legal representative for the Beijing Olympics Organizing Committee in Los Angeles. Crabb was fluent in Japanese and received a bachelor's degree and then a Master of Public Policy degree from Brigham Young University and a J.D. degree from Columbia University Law School. Crabb served as a counselor in the Pasadena California Stake Presidency.

Crabb served as the legal counsel for the company that made the movie The Swan Princess. Crabb also negotiated the media rights related to the Elizabeth Smart kidnapping. He also worked as a lawyer for the Mountain West Conference working on how to increase the number of carriers of its TV channel.

Crabb's book The Movie Business was published by Simon & Schuster, and was enthusiastically praised by film producers Ralph Winter (X-Men and X-Men II), Mace Neufeld, and Gerald R. Molen.
