= List of fastest-grossing films =

The success of a film is assessed by trade publications (such as Box Office Mojo and Variety) primarily by its theatrical box office earnings. Although several other revenue streams also generate revenue (such as theatrical exhibition, home video, television broadcast rights and merchandising), theatrical box office earnings take prominence, mostly because of the availability of the data compared to sales figures for home video and broadcast rights, but also because of historical practice. The success at the box office is measured in a number of ways, and these look at both the total gross as well as the speed with which that gross is attained. This list focuses on the latter. Included on this list are charts showing the films that reached certain milestones in the fastest time. All charts are ranked first by the number of days they took to reach the milestone, and second by their total gross on the day they exceeded the milestone. The charts are not adjusted for inflation, which does erode the achievements of earlier films.

== Fastest-grossing films – worldwide ==
Fastest film to reach milestones
Milestone	Date	Global release date	Title	Days to milestone	Films to hit milestone	Gross on day of milestone/$
$500 million	April 26, 2019	April 24, 2019	Avengers: Endgame	3	>200	643.7 million
$1 billion	April 28, 2019	April 24, 2019	Avengers: Endgame	5	>50	1.224 billion
$1.5 billion	May 1, 2019	April 24, 2019	Avengers: Endgame	8	17	1.6641 billion
$2 billion	May 4, 2019	April 24, 2019	Avengers: Endgame	11	8	>2 billion
$2.5 billion	May 13, 2019	April 24, 2019	Avengers: Endgame	20	3	2.503 billion

=== Fastest to $500 million ===
By 1980, Star Wars became the first movie to reach a $500 million worldwide gross (not adjusting for inflation). The list below is restricted to the 10 movies that reached the milestone the fastest, not taking into account early, single-show premieres.

Fastest-grossing films to $500 million worldwide
Rank	Date	Global release date	Title	Days to milestone	Gross on day of milestone/$
1	April 26, 2019	April 24, 2019	Avengers: Endgame	3	643.7 million
2	August 2, 2026	July 29, 2026	Spider-Man: Brand New Day	5	932 million
3	April 29, 2018	April 25, 2018	Avengers: Infinity War	5	640.9 million
4	December 19, 2021	December 15, 2021	Spider-Man: No Way Home	5	600.8 million
5	November 30, 2025	November 26, 2025	Zootopia 2	5	556.4 million
6	April 16, 2017	April 12, 2017	The Fate of the Furious	5	541.9 million
7	December 20, 2015	December 16, 2015	Star Wars: The Force Awakens	5	529 million
8	June 14, 2015	June 10, 2015	Jurassic World	5	525.5 million
9	February 3, 2025	January 29, 2025	Ne Zha 2	6	553 million
10	February 17, 2021	February 12, 2021	Detective Chinatown 3	6	551 million

=== Fastest to $1 billion ===
Titanic became the first movie to gross over $1 billion worldwide on March 1, 1998, in 74 days of release. The list below is restricted to the 10 movies that reached the milestone the fastest.

Fastest-grossing films to $1 billion worldwide
Rank	Date	Global release date	Title	Days to milestone	Gross on day of milestone/$
1	April 28, 2019	April 24, 2019	Avengers: Endgame	5	1.224 billion
2	August 3, 2026	July 29, 2026	Spider-Man: Brand New Day	6	1.052 billion
3	May 5, 2018	April 25, 2018	Avengers: Infinity War	11	>1.02 billion
4	February 9, 2025	January 29, 2025	Ne Zha 2	12	1.1 billion
5	December 27, 2015	December 16, 2015	Star Wars: The Force Awakens	12	1.0906 billion
6	December 26, 2021	December 15, 2021	Spider-Man: No Way Home	12	1.0544 billion
7	June 22, 2015	June 10, 2015	Jurassic World	13	>1 billion
8	December 27, 2022	December 14, 2022	Avatar: The Way of Water	14	1.0298 billion
9	December 12, 2025	November 26, 2025	Zootopia 2	17	1.08 billion
10	April 17, 2015	April 1, 2015	Furious 7	17	1.0089 billion

=== Fastest to $1.5 billion ===
Titanic became the first movie to gross over $1.5 billion worldwide no later than June 23, 1998, within 188 days of release. The list below is restricted to the 10 movies that reached the milestone the fastest.

Fastest-grossing films to $1.5 billion worldwide
Rank	Date	Global release date	Title	Days to milestone	Gross on day of milestone/$
1	May 1, 2019	April 24, 2019	Avengers: Endgame	8	1.6641 billion
2	August 9, 2026	July 29, 2026	Spider-Man: Brand New Day	12	1.67 billion
3	February 15, 2025	January 29, 2025	Ne Zha 2	18	1.54 billion
4	May 12, 2018	April 25, 2018	Avengers: Infinity War	18	>1.5 billion
5	January 3, 2016	December 16, 2015	Star Wars: The Force Awakens	19	1.51 billion
6	January 4, 2023	December 14, 2022	Avatar: The Way of Water	22	1.5165 billion
7	January 9, 2022	December 15, 2021	Spider-Man: No Way Home	26	1.5362 billion
8	January 17, 2010	December 16, 2009	Avatar	33	>1.5 billion
9	January 1, 2026	November 26, 2025	Zootopia 2	37	1.5063 billion
10	July 21, 2015	June 10, 2015	Jurassic World	42	1.522 billion

=== Fastest to $2 billion ===
Fastest-grossing films to $2 billion worldwide
Rank	Date	Global release date	Title	Days to milestone	Gross on day of milestone/$
1	May 4, 2019	April 24, 2019	Avengers: Endgame	11	>2 billion
2	August 16, 2026	July 29, 2026	Spider-Man: Brand New Day	19	2.022 billion
3	March 7, 2025	January 29, 2025	Ne Zha 2	38	2.03 billion
4	January 22, 2023	December 14, 2022	Avatar: The Way of Water	40	2.024 billion
5	January 31, 2010	December 16, 2009	Avatar	47	2.039 billion
6	June 11, 2018	April 25, 2018	Avengers: Infinity War	48	2.002 billion
7	February 7, 2016	December 16, 2015	Star Wars: The Force Awakens	54	2.008 billion
8	April 15, 2012	December 18, 1997	Titanic	5233	2.03 billion

=== Fastest to $2.5 billion ===
Fastest-grossing films to $2.5 billion worldwide
Rank	Date	Global release date	Title	Days to milestone	Gross on day of milestone/$
1	May 13, 2019	April 24, 2019	Avengers: Endgame	20	2.503 billion
2	October 4, 2026	July 29, 2026	Spider-Man: Brand New Day	68	2.506 billion
3	February 25, 2010	December 16, 2009	Avatar	72	2.501 billion

== Fastest-grossing films – US and Canada ==
Figures listed here do not take into account dates for limited release premieres, but they do take into account the grosses from the previews or "midnight showings" that occur the day before the "official opening day". (Note: For example, Star Wars: The Force Awakens premiered on December 14, 2015 at three locations. but it officially opened in North America on Friday, December 18. However, "midnight" shows occurred late on Thursday, and they totaled up to $57 million.)

On this series of charts, films are ranked first by the number of days they took to reach the milestone, and second by their total gross on the day they exceeded the milestone. The milestones used by trade publications such as Box Office Mojo or The Numbers, are multiples of $50 million. Therefore, the charts below reflect these milestones. Note that in the case of a tie, the highest-grossing film is listed as the fastest-grossing film.

Fastest films to reach milestones
Milestone (in million $)	Date	Title	Days to milestone	Gross on day of milestone	Films to hit milestone (Note: The counts are as of September 2026.)	Ref.
50	July 31, 2026	Spider-Man: Brand New Day	1	$169,843,039	>1900	
100	July 31, 2026	Spider-Man: Brand New Day	1	$169,843,039	>800	
150	July 31, 2026	Spider-Man: Brand New Day	1	$169,843,039	>400	
200	August 1, 2026	Spider-Man: Brand New Day	2	$271,368,679	>200	
250	August 1, 2026	Spider-Man: Brand New Day	2	$271,368,679	>150	
300	August 2, 2026	Spider-Man: Brand New Day	3	$360,091,572	>100	
350	August 2, 2026	Spider-Man: Brand New Day	3	$360,091,572	84	
400	August 3, 2026	Spider-Man: Brand New Day	4	$407,091,572	59	
450	August 5, 2026	Spider-Man: Brand New Day	6	$481,876,434	33	
500	August 6, 2026	Spider-Man: Brand New Day	7	$510,088,528	24	
550	August 7, 2026	Spider-Man: Brand New Day	8	$552,868,203	19	
600	August 8, 2026	Spider-Man: Brand New Day	9	$609,574,361	18	
650	August 9, 2026	Spider-Man: Brand New Day	10	$654,342,914	12	
700	August 12, 2026	Spider-Man: Brand New Day	13	$704,579,779	7	
750	August 15, 2026	Spider-Man: Brand New Day	16	$763,939,810	5	
800	August 18, 2026	Spider-Man: Brand New Day	19	$803,929,225	4	
850	August 23, 2026	Spider-Man: Brand New Day	24	$854,901,181	3	
900	September 4, 2026	Spider-Man: Brand New Day	36	$903,638,026	2	
950	September 27, 2026	Spider-Man: Brand New Day	59	$950,637,311	1	

=== Fastest to $50 million ===
It is believed that the 1915 silent-era film The Birth of a Nation was the first movie that might have grossed over $50 million. Gone with the Wind is the first film to definitively gross over $50 million in the United States, taking its lifetime total to $58.3 million with its 1954 re-release. More than 1,900 films have grossed over $50 million. As of August 2026, 64 did so during their opening day (including previews). The list below is restricted to the biggest 10 during their opening day.

Fastest-grossing films to $50 million
No.	Date	Title	Days to milestone	Gross on day of milestone
1	July 31, 2026	Spider-Man: Brand New Day	1 (Note: It passed the $50 million threshold just from the preview screenings ($72 million).)	$169,843,039
2	April 26, 2019	Avengers: Endgame	1 (Note: It passed the $50 million threshold just from the Thursday night previews ($60 million).)	$157,461,641
3	December 17, 2021	Spider-Man: No Way Home	1 (Note: It passed the $50 million threshold just from the Thursday night previews ($50 million).)	$121,964,712
4	December 18, 2015	Star Wars: The Force Awakens	1 (Note: It passed the $50 million threshold just from the Thursday night previews ($57 million), but this figure incorporates revenues generated from the "Star Wars Marathon Event" from 135 theaters in which all previous six Star Wars films were shown along with Star Wars: The Force Awakens. Ticket prices cost $59.99 for all the films (including The Force Awakens) at an average of $8.57 per movie.)	$119,119,282
5	April 27, 2018	Avengers: Infinity War	1	$106,334,939
6	December 15, 2017	Star Wars: The Last Jedi	1	$104,684,491
7	July 26, 2024	Deadpool & Wolverine	1	$96,189,710
8	July 15, 2011	Harry Potter and the Deathly Hallows – Part 2	1	$91,071,119
9	May 6, 2022	Doctor Strange in the Multiverse of Madness	1	$90,720,784
10	Dec 20, 2019	Star Wars: The Rise of Skywalker	1	$89,615,288

=== Fastest to $100 million ===
The first movie to reach $100 million at the US and Canadian box office was The Sound of Music, during its initial 1965 release. More than 800 films have crossed this threshold since, 90 of which just during their first 3 days of release. The list below is restricted to the fastest 10.

Fastest-grossing films to $100 million
No.	Date	Title	Days to milestone	Gross on day of milestone
1	July 31, 2026	Spider-Man: Brand New Day	1	$169,843,039
2	April 26, 2019	Avengers: Endgame	1 (Note: It took 17 hours from the first release to reach the $100 million threshold.)	$157,461,641
3	December 17, 2021	Spider-Man: No Way Home	1	$121,964,712
4	December 18, 2015	Star Wars: The Force Awakens	1 (Note: It took 21 hours from the first release to reach the $100 million threshold.)	$119,119,282
5	April 27, 2018	Avengers: Infinity War	1	$106,334,939
6	December 15, 2017	Star Wars: The Last Jedi	1	$104,684,491
7	July 26, 2024	Deadpool & Wolverine	2	$157,834,493
8	June 13, 2015	Jurassic World	2	$151,598,780
9	May 5, 2012	The Avengers	2	$150,371,975
10	May 7, 2022	Doctor Strange in the Multiverse of Madness	2	$148,527,634

=== Fastest to $150 million ===
The first movie to reach $150 million at the US and Canadian box office was Gone with the Wind, during 1967 re-release. (Note: The Sound of Music grossed $139 million upon its initial 1965 release, and was the highest-grossing film until the 1967 re-release of Gone with the Wind, which brought the latter's lifetime gross to $152 million.) More than 400 films have crossed this threshold since, 32 of which just in their first 3 days of release. The list below is restricted to the fastest 10.

Fastest-grossing films to $150 million
No.	Date	Title	Days to milestone	Gross on day of milestone
1	July 31, 2026	Spider-Man: Brand New Day	1	$169,843,039
2	April 26, 2019	Avengers: Endgame	1	$157,461,641
3	December 18, 2021	Spider-Man: No Way Home	2	$195,905,991
4	April 28, 2018	Avengers: Infinity War	2	$188,466,551
5	December 19, 2015	Star Wars: The Force Awakens	2	$187,413,486
6	December 16, 2017	Star Wars: The Last Jedi	2	$168,677,696
7	July 26, 2024	Deadpool & Wolverine	2	$157,834,493
8	June 13, 2015	Jurassic World	2	$151,598,780
9	May 5, 2012	The Avengers	2	$150,371,975
10	February 18, 2018	Black Panther	3	$202,003,951

=== Fastest to $200 million ===
The first movie to reach this milestone was Jaws, on its 1976 re-release. (Note: Jaws was the first film to gross $200 million. It grossed $190 million upon its initial 1975 release, and a further $16 million gross rental from its 1976 reissue.) More than 200 films have grossed over $200 million at the US and Canadian box office, 39 of which reached it in their first 7-days. The list below is restricted to the fastest 10.

Fastest-grossing films to $200 million
No.	Date	Title	Days to milestone	Gross on day of milestone
1	August 1, 2026	Spider-Man: Brand New Day	2	$271,368,679
2	April 27, 2019	Avengers: Endgame	2	$266,725,763
3	December 19, 2021	Spider-Man: No Way Home	3	$260,138,569
4	April 29, 2018	Avengers: Infinity War	3	$257,698,183
5	December 20, 2015	Star Wars: The Force Awakens	3	$247,966,675
6	December 17, 2017	Star Wars: The Last Jedi	3	$220,009,584
7	July 26, 2024	Deadpool & Wolverine	3	$211,435,291
8	June 14, 2015	Jurassic World	3	$208,806,270
9	May 6, 2012	The Avengers	3	$207,438,708
10	February 18, 2018	Black Panther	3	$202,003,951

=== Fastest to $250 million ===
The first movie to reach this milestone was Star Wars: Episode IV – A New Hope with its 1978 reissue. More than 100 films have grossed over $250 million at the US and Canadian box office, 15 of which did so in the first week. The list below is restricted to the fastest 10.

Fastest-grossing films to $250 million
No.	Date	Title	Days to milestone	Gross on day of milestone
1	August 1, 2026	Spider-Man: Brand New Day	2	$271,368,679
2	April 27, 2019	Avengers: Endgame	2	$266,725,763
3	December 19, 2021	Spider-Man: No Way Home	3	$260,138,569
4	April 29, 2018	Avengers: Infinity War	3	$257,698,183
5	December 21, 2015	Star Wars: The Force Awakens	4	$288,076,417
6	February 20, 2018	Black Panther	5	$263,013,041
7	December 19, 2017	Star Wars: The Last Jedi	5	$261,820,146
8	July 30, 2024	Deadpool & Wolverine	5	$261,190,114
9	June 16, 2015	Jurassic World	5	$258,493,605
10	July 24, 2019	The Lion King	6	$260,250,600

=== Fastest to $300 million ===
The first movie to reach this milestone was Star Wars: Episode IV – A New Hope with its 1981 reissue. More than 100 films have grossed over $300 million at the US and Canadian box office. The list below is restricted to the fastest 10.

Fastest-grossing films to $300 million
No.	Date	Title	Days to milestone	Gross on day of milestone
1	August 2, 2026	Spider-Man: Brand New Day	3	$360,091,572
2	April 28, 2019	Avengers: Endgame	3	$357,115,007
3	December 21, 2021	Spider-Man: No Way Home	5	$328,685,544
4	December 22, 2015	Star Wars: The Force Awakens	5	$325,438,146
5	May 1, 2018	Avengers: Infinity War	5	$305,864,408
6	August 2, 2024	Deadpool & Wolverine	8	$326,875,919
7	June 19, 2015	Jurassic World	8	$325,326,090
8	December 22, 2017	Star Wars: The Last Jedi	8	$321,365,440
9	February 23, 2018	Black Panther	8	$320,812,422
10	December 27, 2019	Star Wars: The Rise of Skywalker	8	$315,866,789

=== Fastest to $350 million ===
The first movie to pass this threshold was E.T. the Extra-Terrestrial on April 15, 1983, after 314 days of release. As of August 2026, 84 films have grossed over $350 million at the US and Canadian box office. The list below is restricted to the fastest 10.

Fastest-grossing films to $350 million
No.	Date	Title	Days to milestone	Gross on day of milestone
1	August 2, 2026	Spider-Man: Brand New Day	3	$360,091,572
2	April 28, 2019	Avengers: Endgame	3	$357,115,007
3	December 23, 2015	Star Wars: The Force Awakens	6	$363,460,329
4	December 22, 2021	Spider-Man: No Way Home	6	$356,531,855
5	May 4, 2018	Avengers: Infinity War	8	$369,760,540
6	February 24, 2018	Black Panther	9	$368,297,777
7	August 3, 2024	Deadpool & Wolverine	9	$364,981,268
8	June 20, 2015	Jurassic World	9	$364,438,555
9	December 23, 2017	Star Wars: The Last Jedi	9	$350,537,855
10	May 13, 2012	The Avengers	10	$373,071,647

=== Fastest to $400 million ===
The first movie to reach this milestone was Star Wars: Episode IV – A New Hope on Feb 7, 1997, during its 20-year anniversary re-release. As of August 2026, 59 films have grossed over $400 million at the US and Canadian box office. The list below is restricted to the fastest 10.

Fastest-grossing films to $400 million
No.	Date	Title	Days to milestone	Gross on day of milestone
1	August 3, 2026	Spider-Man: Brand New Day	4	$407,091,572
2	April 30, 2019	Avengers: Endgame	5	$427,099,795
3	December 25, 2015	Star Wars: The Force Awakens	8	$440,181,717
4	December 24, 2021	Spider-Man: No Way Home	8	$405,520,983
5	May 5, 2018	Avengers: Infinity War	9	$416,462,994
6	February 25, 2018	Black Panther	10	$403,613,257
7	June 21, 2015	Jurassic World	10	$402,800,095
8	August 5, 2024	Deadpool & Wolverine	11	$407,760,045
9	December 26, 2017	Star Wars: The Last Jedi	12	$423,361,767
10	January 1, 2020	Star Wars: The Rise of Skywalker	13	$407,782,706

=== Fastest to $450 million ===
The first movie to reach this milestone was Star Wars: Episode IV – A New Hope on Mar 7, 1997, during its 20-year anniversary re-release. As of August 2026, 33 films have grossed over $450 million at the US and Canadian box office. The list below is restricted to the fastest 10.

Fastest-grossing films to $450 million
No.	Date	Title	Days to milestone	Gross on day of milestone
1	August 5, 2026	Spider-Man: Brand New Day	6	$481,876,434
2	May 1, 2019	Avengers: Endgame	6	$452,351,786
3	December 26, 2015	Star Wars: The Force Awakens	9	$496,913,249
4	December 26, 2021	Spider-Man: No Way Home	10	$470,413,982
5	May 6, 2018	Avengers: Infinity War	10	$453,107,350
6	December 28, 2017	Star Wars: The Last Jedi	14	$464,698,228
7	June 26, 2015	Jurassic World	15	$460,533,690
8	August 9, 2024	Deadpool & Wolverine	15	$455,750,762
9	March 2, 2018	Black Panther	15	$451,657,573
10	June 29, 2024	Inside Out 2	16	$451,270,367

=== Fastest to $500 million ===
The first movie to reach $500 million in the US and Canada was Titanic on March 20, 1998, after 98 days of release. As of August 2026, 24 films have grossed over $500 million at the US and Canadian box office. The list below is restricted to the fastest 10.

Fastest-grossing films to $500 million
No.	Date	Title	Days to milestone	Gross on day of milestone
1	August 6, 2026	Spider-Man: Brand New Day	7	$510,088,528
2	May 3, 2019	Avengers: Endgame	8	$514,631,412
3	December 27, 2015	Star Wars: The Force Awakens	10	$540,058,914
4	December 28, 2021	Spider-Man: No Way Home	12	$516,531,392
5	May 11, 2018	Avengers: Infinity War	15	$501,998,715
6	December 30, 2017	Star Wars: The Last Jedi	16	$503,651,719
7	March 4, 2018	Black Panther	17	$501,706,972
8	June 26, 2015	Jurassic World	17	$500,373,420
9	August 13, 2024	Deadpool & Wolverine	19	$506,937,007
10	July 4, 2024	Inside Out 2	21	$503,823,699

=== Fastest to $550 million ===
The first movie to reach $550 million in the US and Canada was Titanic on April 17, 1998, after 121 days of release. As of September 2026, nineteen films have grossed over $550 million at the US and Canadian box office. The list below is restricted to the fastest 10.

Fastest-grossing films to $550 million
No.	Date	Title	Days to milestone	Gross on day of milestone
1	August 7, 2026	Spider-Man: Brand New Day	8	$552,868,203
2	May 4, 2019	Avengers: Endgame	9	$576,158,461
3	December 28, 2015	Star Wars: The Force Awakens	11	$571,420,943
4	December 30, 2021	Spider-Man: No Way Home	14	$557,577,074
5	May 14, 2018	Avengers: Infinity War	18	$552,716,088
6	January 5, 2018	Star Wars: The Last Jedi	22	$555,486,075
7	March 9, 2018	Black Panther	24	$561,697,180
8	July 3, 2015	Jurassic World	24	$556,538,010
9	August 20, 2024	Deadpool & Wolverine	26	$553,509,894
10	July 11, 2024	Inside Out 2	28	$551,844,077

=== Fastest to $600 million ===
The first movie to reach $600 million in the US and Canada was Titanic on August 28, 1998, after 255 days of release. As of September 2026, eighteen films have grossed over $600 million at the US and Canadian box office. The list below is restricted to the fastest 10.

Fastest-grossing films to $600 million
No.	Date	Title	Days to milestone	Gross on day of milestone
1	August 8, 2026	Spider-Man: Brand New Day	9	$609,574,361
2	May 5, 2019	Avengers: Endgame	10	$621,277,849
3	December 29, 2015	Star Wars: The Force Awakens	12	$600,949,526
4	January 2, 2022	Spider-Man: No Way Home	17	$613,600,664
5	May 22, 2018	Avengers: Infinity War	26	$601,381,683
6	March 18, 2018	Black Panther	31	$605,027,218
7	July 17, 2015	Jurassic World	36	$603,031,100
8	January 20, 2018	Star Wars: The Last Jedi	37	$602,589,476
9	September 2, 2024	Deadpool & Wolverine	39	$603,907,246
10	January 24, 2023	Avatar: The Way of Water	40	$601,998,602

=== Fastest to $650 million ===
The first movie to reach $650 million in the US and Canada was Avatar on February 13, 2010, after 58 days of release. As of August 2026, twelve films have grossed over $650 million at the US and Canadian box office. The list below is restricted to the fastest 10.

Fastest-grossing films to $650 million
No.	Date	Title	Days to milestone	Gross on day of milestone
1	August 9, 2026	Spider-Man: Brand New Day	10	$654,342,914
2	May 8, 2019	Avengers: Endgame	13	$652,935,585
3	December 31, 2015	Star Wars: The Force Awakens	14	$651,965,583
4	January 8, 2022	Spider-Man: No Way Home	23	$658,870,933
5	June 9, 2018	Avengers: Infinity War	44	$652,709,699
6	April 1, 2018	Black Panther	45	$650,923,549
7	February 13, 2010	Avatar	58	$651,346,762
8	February 16, 2023	Avatar: The Way of Water	62	$650,432,427
9	July 31, 2022	Top Gun: Maverick	66	$650,311,290
10	September 2, 2024	Inside Out 2	81	$650,825,110

=== Fastest to $700 million ===
Fastest-grossing films to $700 million
No.	Date	Title	Days to milestone	Gross on day of milestone
1	August 12, 2026	Spider-Man: Brand New Day	13	$704,579,779
2	January 2, 2016	Star Wars: The Force Awakens	16	$720,729,671
3	May 11, 2019	Avengers: Endgame	16	$704,178,577
4	January 17, 2022	Spider-Man: No Way Home	32	$702,574,237
5	February 27, 2010	Avatar	72	$702,621,374
6	September 5, 2022	Top Gun: Maverick	102	$701,250,369
7	August 5, 2018	Black Panther	171	$700,006,415

=== Fastest to $750 million ===
Fastest-grossing films to $750 million
No.	Date	Title	Days to milestone	Gross on day of milestone
1	August 15, 2026	Spider-Man: Brand New Day	16	$763,939,810
2	January 4, 2016	Star Wars: The Force Awakens	18	$750,230,824
3	May 18, 2019	Avengers: Endgame	23	$761,769,075
4	February 8, 2022	Spider-Man: No Way Home	54	$750,429,025
5	August 27, 2010	Avatar	253	$750,999,186

=== Fastest to $800 million ===
Fastest-grossing films to $800 million
No.	Date	Title	Days to milestone	Gross on day of milestone
1	August 18, 2026	Spider-Man: Brand New Day	19	$803,929,225
2	January 9, 2016	Star Wars: The Force Awakens	23	$800,329,495
3	May 27, 2019	Avengers: Endgame	32	$803,395,591
4	March 26, 2022	Spider-Man: No Way Home	100	$800,029,736

=== Fastest to $850 million ===
Fastest-grossing films to $850 million
No.	Date	Title	Days to milestone	Gross on day of milestone
1	August 23, 2026	Spider-Man: Brand New Day	24	$854,901,181
2	January 17, 2016	Star Wars: The Force Awakens	31	$852,274,958
3	July 12, 2019	Avengers: Endgame	78	$850,108,592

=== Fastest to $900 million ===
Fastest-grossing films to $900 million
No.	Date	Title	Days to milestone	Gross on day of milestone
1	September 4, 2026	Spider-Man: Brand New Day	36	$903,638,026
2	February 5, 2016	Star Wars: The Force Awakens	50	$900,844,232

=== Fastest to $950 million ===
Fastest-grossing films to $950 million
No.	Date	Title	Days to milestone	Gross on day of milestone
1	September 27, 2026	Spider-Man: Brand New Day	59	$950,637,311

== See also ==
- List of highest-grossing films
- List of highest-grossing openings for films
- Lists of highest-grossing films
