= List of highest-grossing openings for films =

The following is a list of the highest-grossing opening weekends for films. The list is dominated by recent films due to inflation, steadily increasing production and marketing budgets, and modern films opening on more screens.

== Biggest worldwide openings ==
This list charts films the 50 biggest worldwide openings. Since many films do not open on Fridays in many markets, the 'opening' is taken to be the gross between the first day of release and the first Sunday following the movie's release. Figures prior to the year 2002 are not available.

Since many American films do not open in all markets at the same time, the 'opening' gross varies depending on when it was released in the US-Canada market. For example, for films like Harry Potter and the Deathly Hallows – Part 2 and Batman v Superman: Dawn of Justice which opened in the US-Canada market and in most other major markets during the same weekend, the 'opening' is the total gross of the film during that weekend. On the other hand, for films like Avengers: Age of Ultron and Captain America: Civil War which opened in several markets a week ahead of their respective releases in the US-Canada market, the 'opening' is the sum of the opening grosses in the markets where they were released first and the opening in the US-Canada market. In the latter case, the opening grosses from territories after the initial overseas opening are not included in the 'opening' of the film. In all cases, if a film opens in a market after its release in the US-Canada market, that opening is not included in the 'opening' of the film.

Rank	Film	Year	Opening (USD)	Ref
1	Avengers: Endgame	2019	$1,223,641,414	
2	Spider-Man: Brand New Day	2026	$932,091,572	
3	Avengers: Infinity War	2018	$640,521,291	
4	Spider-Man: No Way Home	2021	$600,506,041	
5	Zootopia 2	2025	$560,333,554	
6	The Fate of The Furious	2017	$541,937,239	
7	Star Wars: The Force Awakens	2015	$528,966,675	
8	Jurassic World	2015	$525,504,128	
9	Harry Potter and the Deathly Hallows – Part 2	2011	$483,189,427	
10	Captain Marvel	2019	$456,718,598	
11	Doctor Strange in the Multiverse of Madness	2022	$452,000,000	
12	Star Wars: The Last Jedi	2017	$450,821,889	
13	Deadpool & Wolverine	2024	$444,735,291	
14	Avatar: The Way of Water	2022	$441,703,887	
15	Ne Zha 2	2025	$431,280,000	
16	Batman v Superman: Dawn of Justice	2016	$422,507,347	
17	Detective Chinatown 3	2021	$399,682,005	
18	The Battle at Lake Changjin II (Water Gate Bridge)	2022	$398,000,000	
19	Furious 7	2015	$397,627,459	
20	Harry Potter and the Half-Blood Prince	2009	$394,022,354	
21	The Avengers	2012	$392,538,708	
22	Avengers: Age of Ultron	2015	$392,471,109	
23	Moana 2	2024	$389,300,000	
24	Jurassic World Dominion	2022	$386,000,000	
25	Transformers: Dark of the Moon	2011	$382,425,000	
26	Spider-Man 3	2007	$381,660,892	
27	Captain America: Civil War	2016	$379,539,142	
28	The Super Mario Bros. Movie	2023	$377,200,000	
29	Star Wars: The Rise of Skywalker	2019	$373,500,000	
30	Iron Man 3	2013	$372,553,677	
31	The Super Mario Galaxy Movie	2026	$372,500,000	
32	Black Panther	2018	$371,367,531	
33	Frozen 2	2019	$358,200,000	
34	Beauty and the Beast	2017	$357,026,593	
35	Barbie	2023	$356,322,044	
36	Pirates of the Caribbean: On Stranger Tides	2011	$350,653,677	
37	Avatar: Fire and Ash	2025	$347,100,000	
38	Pirates of the Caribbean: At World's End	2007	$343,972,864	
39	Lilo & Stitch	2025	$341,000,000	
40	The Twilight Saga: Breaking Dawn – Part 2	2012	$340,667,634	
41	Harry Potter and the Order of the Phoenix	2007	$332,715,157	
42	Black Panther: Wakanda Forever	2022	$331,600,000	
43	Harry Potter and the Deathly Hallows – Part 1	2010	$330,017,372	
44	Fast X	2023	$323,838,710	
45	Jurassic World Rebirth	2025	$322,099,000	
46	A Minecraft Movie	2025	$313,700,000	
47	Toy Story 5	2026	$312,000,000	
48	Star Wars: Episode III – Revenge of the Sith	2005	$303,949,700	
49	Transformers: Age of Extinction	2014	$302,138,390	
50	Thor: Love and Thunder	2022	$302,000,000	

== Individual markets ==
=== Biggest openings ===
==== China ====
Since many films do not open on Fridays in many markets (such as China), the 'opening' is taken to be the gross between the first day of release and the first Sunday following the movie's release.

Rank	Film	Year	Opening (USD)	Ref
1	Ne Zha 2	2025	$431,280,000	
2	Detective Chinatown 3	2021	$399,682,005	
3	The Battle at Lake Changjin II (Water Gate Bridge)	2022	$398,000,000	
4	Avengers: Endgame	2019	$330,528,623	
5	The Wandering Earth	2019	$298,110,095	
6	The Mermaid	2016	$274,049,983	
7	Zootopia 2	2025	$271,724,258	
8	The Captain	2019	$251,966,468	
9	The Battle at Lake Changjin	2021	$235,000,000	
10	Too Cool to Kill	2022	$217,000,000	

==== United States and Canada ====
Rank	Film	Year	Opening (USD)
1	Spider-Man: Brand New Day	2026	$360,091,572
2	Avengers: Endgame	2019	$357,115,007
3	Spider-Man: No Way Home	2021	$260,138,569
4	Avengers: Infinity War	2018	$257,698,183
5	Star Wars: The Force Awakens	2015	$247,966,675
6	Star Wars: The Last Jedi	2017	$220,009,584
7	Deadpool & Wolverine	2024	$211,435,291
8	Jurassic World	2015	$208,806,270
9	The Avengers	2012	$207,438,708
10	Black Panther	2018	$202,003,951

=== Biggest opening day ===
==== United States and Canada ====
A list of the biggest opening days of release. Opening day grosses also include earnings from previews which have ranged from noon on the previous day to midnight, and can also include multiple days of previews.

Rank	Film	Year	Opening day	Previews
1	Spider-Man: Brand New Day	2026	$169,843,039	$72 million from Wednesday evening and Thursday preview screenings
2	Avengers: Endgame	2019	$157,461,641	$60 million from Thursday evening preview screenings
3	Spider-Man: No Way Home	2021	$121,964,712	$50 million from Thursday evening preview screenings
4	Star Wars: The Force Awakens	2015	$119,119,282	$57 million from Thursday evening preview screenings
5	Avengers: Infinity War	2018	$106,334,939	$39 million from Thursday evening preview screenings
6	Star Wars: The Last Jedi	2017	$104,684,491	$45 million from Thursday evening preview screenings
7	Deadpool & Wolverine	2024	$96,189,710	$38.5 million from Thursday preview screenings
8	Harry Potter and the Deathly Hallows – Part 2	2011	$91,071,119	$43.5 million from midnight preview screenings
9	Doctor Strange in the Multiverse of Madness	2022	$90,720,784	$36 million from Thursday preview screenings
10	Star Wars: The Rise of Skywalker	2019	$89,615,288	$45 million from Thursday evening preview screenings

==== China ====
Rank	Film	Year	Opening day	Ref
1	Detective Chinatown 3	2021	$157,660,685	(Note: According to EntGroup, Detective Chinatown 3 grossed CN¥1,018,220,000 on its opening day of 12 February 2021. According to the 2021 exchange rate on the day of release, this is equivalent to $157,660,685.)
2	Avengers: Endgame	2019	$108,331,722	(Note: According to EntGroup, Avengers: Endgame grossed CN¥728,130,000 on its opening day of 24 April 2019. According to the 2019 exchange rate on the day of release, this is equivalent to $108,331,722.)
3	The Battle at Lake Changjin II	2022	$105,000,000	
4	Monster Hunt 2	2018	$86,166,961	(Note: According to EntGroup, Monster Hunt 2 grossed CN¥546,850,000 on its opening day of 16 February 2018. According to the 2018 exchange rate on the day of release, this is equivalent to $86,166,961.)
5	Avengers: Infinity War	2018	$70,567,331	(Note: According to EntGroup, Avengers: Infinity War grossed CN¥446,790,000 on its opening day of 11 May 2018. According to the 2018 exchange rate on the day of release, this is equivalent to $70,567,331.)
6	The Fate of the Furious	2017	$69,699,875	(Note: According to EntGroup, The Fate of the Furious grossed CN¥479,800,000 on its opening day of 14 April 2017. According to the 2017 exchange rate on the day of release, this is equivalent to $69,699,875.)
7	Ne Zha 2	2025	$67,220,000	
8	Furious 7	2015	$64,179,849	(Note: According to EntGroup, Furious 7 grossed CN¥398,820,000 on its opening day of 12 April 2015. According to the 2015 exchange rate on the day of release, this is equivalent to $64,179,849.)
9	Crazy Alien	2019	$60,833,272	(Note: According to EntGroup, Crazy Alien grossed CN¥410,290,000 on its opening day of 5 February 2019. According to the 2019 exchange rate on the day of release, this is equivalent to $60,833,272.)

== Record holders ==
=== Worldwide ===
These are the films that, when first released, set the opening three-day weekend record after going into wide release.

Year	Film	Opening (USD in millions)
2001	Harry Potter and the Philosopher's Stone	$114.1
2002	Spider-Man	$125.9
2002	Star Wars: Episode II – Attack of the Clones	$179.3
2002	The Lord of the Rings: The Two Towers	$189.9
2003	The Matrix Revolutions	$201.4
2003	The Lord of the Rings: The Return of the King	$250.0
2005	Star Wars: Episode III – Revenge of the Sith	$303.9
2007	Spider-Man 3	$381.7
2009	Harry Potter and the Half-Blood Prince	$394.0
2011	Harry Potter and the Deathly Hallows – Part 2	$483.2
2015	Jurassic World	$525.5
2015	Star Wars: The Force Awakens	$529.0
2017	The Fate of the Furious	$541.9
2018	Avengers: Infinity War	$640.5
2019	Avengers: Endgame	$1,223.6

=== United States and Canada ===
These are the films that, when first released, set the opening record in the United States and Canada.

Year	Film	Opening (USD)	Ref
1963	King Kong vs. Godzilla	$337,911	
1967	You Only Live Twice	$600,000	
1969	On Her Majesty's Secret Service	$1,200,000	
1971	Diamonds Are Forever	$1,569,249	
1974	The Man with the Golden Gun	$3,441,228	
1975	Jaws	$7,061,513	(Note: According to contemporaneous reports, The Deep opened to $8,124,316 on 800 screens on the weekend of June 17, 1977 beating the record set by Jaws. Current websites only record data for 731 screens with a gross of $6.8 million. Using the lower figure for The Deep, Jaws lost the overall weekend record to Star Wars in 1977 with a gross of $7,195,573 in its eleventh weekend.)
1977	The Deep	$8,124,316	(Note: According to contemporaneous reports, The Deep opened to $8,124,316 on 800 screens on the weekend of June 17, 1977 beating the record set by Jaws. Current websites only record data for 731 screens with a gross of $6.8 million. Using the lower figure for The Deep, Jaws lost the overall weekend record to Star Wars in 1977 with a gross of $7,195,573 in its eleventh weekend.)
1978	Jaws 2	$9,866,023	
1978	Star Wars (re-release)	$10,166,336	
1978	Every Which Way but Loose (Note: Every Which Way but Loose held the opening weekend record until the following year but it lost the overall weekend record on the last weekend in 1978 to Superman, which recorded a gross of $10,363,384 in its third weekend.)	$10,272,294	
1979	Star Trek: The Motion Picture	$11,926,421	
1981	Superman II	$14,100,523	
1982	Star Trek II: The Wrath of Khan	$14,347,221	
1982	Rocky III	$16,015,408	
1983	Return of the Jedi	$23,019,618	
1984	Indiana Jones and the Temple of Doom	$25,337,110	
1987	Beverly Hills Cop II	$26,348,555	
1989	Indiana Jones and the Last Crusade	$29,355,021	
1989	Ghostbusters II	$29,472,894	
1989	Batman	$40,505,884	
1992	Batman Returns	$45,687,711	
1993	Jurassic Park	$47,026,828	
1995	Batman Forever	$52,784,433	
1997	The Lost World: Jurassic Park	$72,132,785	
2001	Harry Potter and the Sorcerer's Stone	$90,294,621	
2002	Spider-Man	$114,844,116	
2006	Pirates of the Caribbean: Dead Man's Chest	$135,634,554	
2007	Spider-Man 3	$151,116,516	
2008	The Dark Knight	$158,411,483	
2011	Harry Potter and the Deathly Hallows – Part 2	$169,189,427	
2012	The Avengers	$207,438,708	
2015	Jurassic World	$208,806,270	
2015	Star Wars: The Force Awakens	$247,966,675	
2018	Avengers: Infinity War	$257,815,482	
2019	Avengers: Endgame	$357,115,007	
2026	Spider-Man: Brand New Day	$360,091,572	

== See also ==
- List of fastest-grossing films
- List of highest-grossing openings for animated films
- List of highest-grossing second weekends for films
- Second weekend in box office performance
