= Box office territory =

Box office reporting area

A box office territory, (Note: Synonymous terms include box office market, movie territory, and cinema territory.) in context of the film industry, ranges from a single country to a grouping of countries for reporting box office gross ticket sales. This is distinct from dependent territories, though such territories under a country's administrative control may confuse box office revenue and reporting due to data variously including or excluding them.

== Background ==
=== Overview ===
In box office parlance, "North America" is a territory that comprises the United States and Canada, despite there being 23 countries within the geographical definition of North America. In context of the box office, North America is traditionally considered the territory with the largest gross. (It was overtaken by China in 2020.) Kelly Crabb wrote in her 2005 book The Movie Business that North America has traditionally represented the largest "source of revenues" and also has had "the world's most important" film distribution companies located in it.

In 2020, China became the largest box office territory, overtaking North America in gross total. The transition, long anticipated by analysts, was accelerated by the COVID-19 pandemic.

Japan was the second-largest box office territory before it was surpassed by China in 2011. In 2019, the next three largest territories were the South Korea, United Kingdom, and France. The box office territory of the United Kingdom comprises the UK and Ireland. Malta's box office is added to the UK and Ireland total by at least one data provider. The countries of Belgium, the Netherlands, and Luxembourg, together known as Benelux, are sometimes treated as a single box office territory, although the data is also reported separately for each country by some data providers.

Mexico, whose box office gross is reported separately from the "North American" data, is the top box office territory in Latin America.

=== North America and China ===
From 2011 to 2019, China was the second largest territory, and The Hollywood Reporter said in 2016 that it was expected to surpass North America in the near future. In September 2017, China's State Administration of Press, Publication, Radio, Film and Television predicted that China would surpass North America in 2020 as the number-one box office territory. In the following October, Observer reported, "Double-digit growth puts China back on pace to overtake North America as the No. 1 box office territory in the world within the next few years." In April 2018, Variety reported, "It has frequently been predicted that the film business in China would overtake North America's. But many forecasters got their timing wrong when more than a decade of unbroken Chinese growth stalled between mid-2016 and mid-2017." After China's box office grew 9% in 2018 compared to 13.5% the year before, Variety reported of China surpassing North America, "The uneven growth of recent years has undone numerous past forecasts of when that might happen." Reuters reported that despite the second ranking, "[China] already has more total movie screens [than North America] after years of rapid expansion in theater networks."

In 2020, China overtook North America as the world's largest box office market for the first time. This has been largely attributed to the COVID-19 pandemic having a greater negative impact in North America than in China. China was again the world's highest-grossing market in 2021.

== See also ==
- Largest markets by box office revenue

== Bibliography ==
- Kroon, Richard W. (2014). A/V A to Z: An Encyclopedic Dictionary of Media, Entertainment and Other Audiovisual Terms. McFarland & Company. ISBN 978-0-7864-5740-3.
