= List of accolades received by Avengers: Infinity War =

Avengers: Infinity War accolades
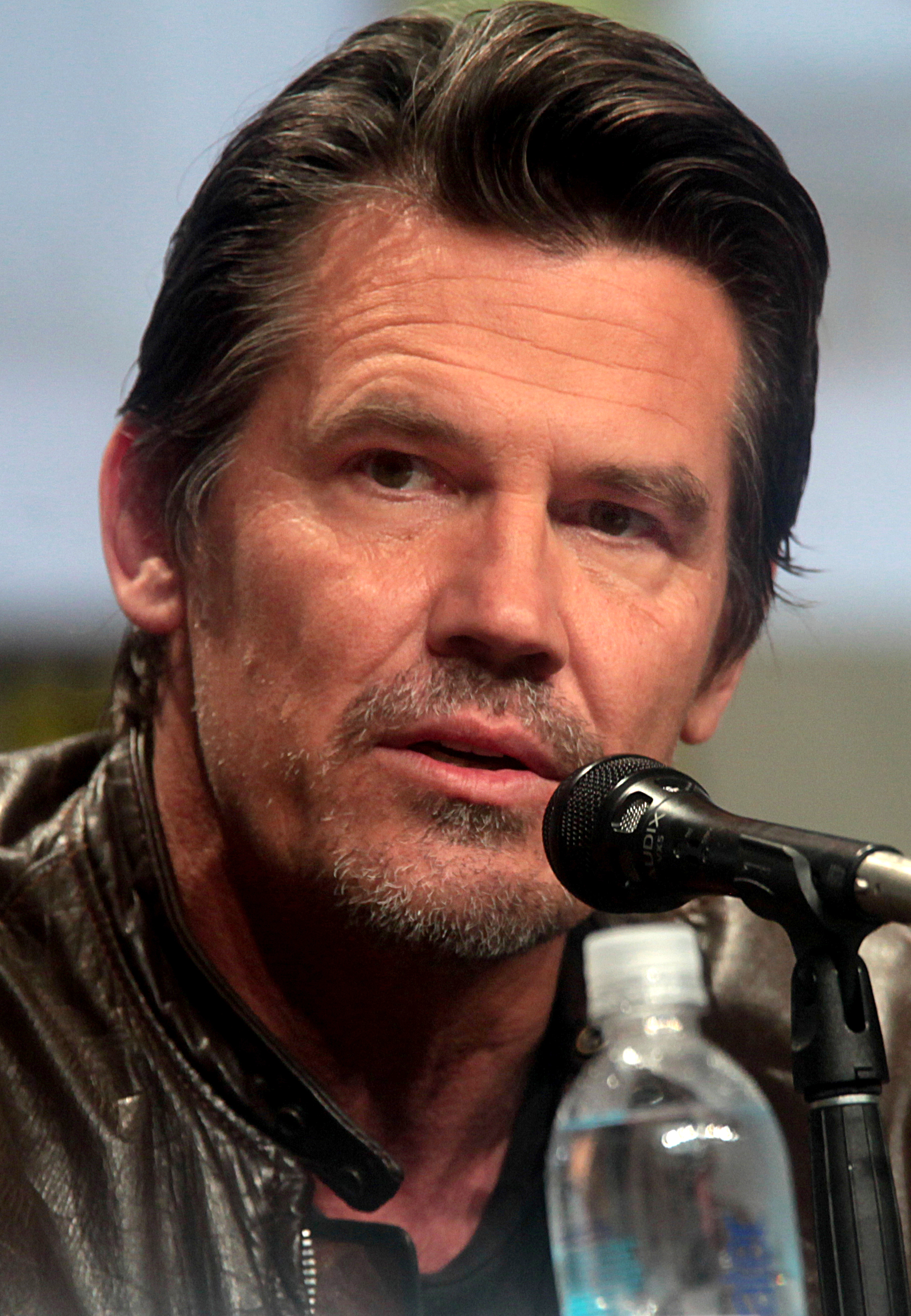
- Josh Brolin received multiple awards and nominations for his role in the film.
Awards and nominations
Award	Wins	Nominations
Academy Awards	0	1
Annie Awards	0	1
Austin Film Critics Association Awards	1	2
BET Awards	0	1
British Academy Film Awards	0	1
Costume Designers Guild Awards	0	1
Critics' Choice Movie Awards	0	2
Dragon Awards	0	1
Grammy Awards	0	1
Florida Film Critics Circle Awards	1	1
Georgia Film Critics Association Awards	0	1
Golden Reel Awards	0	1
Golden Trailer Awards	1	6
Guild of Music Supervisors Awards	0	1
Hollywood Film Awards	1	1
Hollywood Post Alliance Awards	1	3
Hugo Awards	0	1
Los Angeles Online Film Critics Society Awards	2	5
Los Angeles Online Film Critics Society Midseason Awards	0	2
MTV Movie & TV Awards	0	3
Nickelodeon Kids' Choice Awards	2	10
People's Choice Awards	3	6
Satellite Awards	0	1
Saturn Awards	1	2
Screen Actors Guild Awards	0	1
Seattle Film Critics Society Awards	0	2
St. Louis Film Critics Association	1	3
Teen Choice Awards	3	10
Visual Effects Society Awards	4	6
Washington D.C. Area Film Critics Association Awards	1	1

Totals (Note: Certain award groups do not simply award one winner. They acknowledge several different recipients, have runners-up, and have third place. Since this is a specific recognition and is different from losing an award, runner-up mentions are considered wins in this award tally. For simplification and to avoid errors, each award in this list has been presumed to have had a prior nomination.)
- Wins: 22
- Nominations: 78

Avengers: Infinity War is a 2018 American superhero film based on the Marvel Comics superhero team the Avengers. Produced by Marvel Studios and distributed by Walt Disney Studios Motion Pictures, it is the sequel to The Avengers (2012) and Avengers: Age of Ultron (2015), and the 19th film in the Marvel Cinematic Universe (MCU). Directed by Anthony and Joe Russo and written by Christopher Markus and Stephen McFeely, the film features an ensemble cast including Robert Downey Jr., Chris Hemsworth, Mark Ruffalo, Chris Evans, Scarlett Johansson, Benedict Cumberbatch, Don Cheadle, Tom Holland, Chadwick Boseman, Paul Bettany, Elizabeth Olsen, Anthony Mackie, Sebastian Stan, Danai Gurira, Letitia Wright, Dave Bautista, Zoe Saldaña, Josh Brolin, and Chris Pratt. In the film, the Avengers and the Guardians of the Galaxy attempt to prevent Thanos from collecting the six all-powerful Infinity Stones as part of his quest to kill half of all life in the universe.

Avengers: Infinity War premiered in Hollywood, Los Angeles, on April 23, 2018, and was released in the United States on April 27, as part of Phase Three of the MCU. Produced on a budget of $325–400 million, it was the fourth film and the first superhero film to gross over $2 billion worldwide, breaking numerous box office records, and becoming the highest-grossing film of 2018 and the fourth-highest-grossing film of all time both worldwide and in the United States and Canada. On the review aggregator website Rotten Tomatoes, the film holds an approval rating of 85% based on 486 reviews.

Avengers: Infinity War garnered awards and nominations in various categories with particular recognition for its acting (mainly that of Brolin) and visual effects. It received a nomination for Best Visual Effects at the 91st Academy Awards. The film received a nomination for Outstanding Achievement for Character Animation in a Live Action Production at the 46th Annie Awards. At the 72nd British Academy Film Awards, Avengers: Infinity War was nominated for Best Special Visual Effects. It received two nominations at the 24th Critics' Choice Awards. Composer Alan Silvestri received a nomination for Best Instrumental Composition at the Grammy Awards' 61st ceremony. The film won one of two nominations at the 45th Saturn Awards.

== Accolades ==
Accolades received by Avengers: Infinity War
Award	Date of ceremony	Category	Recipient(s)	Result	Ref.
Academy Awards	February 24, 2019	Best Visual Effects	Dan DeLeeuw, Russell Earl, Kelly Port, and Dan Sudick	Nominated	
Annie Awards	February 2, 2019	Outstanding Achievement for Character Animation in a Live Action Production	Paul Story, Sidney Kombo, Eteuati Tema, Jacob Luamanuvae, and Sam Sharplin	Nominated	
Austin Film Critics Association Awards	January 7, 2019	Best Ensemble	Avengers: Infinity War	Nominated	
Austin Film Critics Association Awards	January 7, 2019	Best Motion Capture/Special Effects Performance	Josh Brolin	Won	
BET Awards	June 23, 2019	Best Actor	Chadwick Boseman	Nominated	
British Academy Film Awards	February 10, 2019	Best Special Visual Effects	Dan DeLeeuw, Russell Earl, Kelly Port, and Dan Sudick	Nominated	
Costume Designers Guild Awards	February 19, 2019	Excellence in Sci-Fi/Fantasy Film	Judianna Makovsky	Nominated	
Critics' Choice Movie Awards	January 13, 2019	Best Action Movie	Avengers: Infinity War	Nominated	
Critics' Choice Movie Awards	January 13, 2019	Best Visual Effects	Avengers: Infinity War	Nominated	
Dragon Awards	September 1, 2018	Best Science Fiction or Fantasy Movie	Avengers: Infinity War	Nominated	
Florida Film Critics Circle Awards	December 21, 2018	Best Visual Effects	Dan DeLeeuw, Russell Earl, Kelly Port, and Dan Sudick	Runner-up	
Georgia Film Critics Association Awards	January 12, 2019	Oglethorpe Award for Excellence in Georgia Cinema	Avengers: Infinity War	Nominated	
Golden Reel Awards	February 17, 2019	Outstanding Achievement in Sound Editing – Sound Effects and Foley for Feature Film	Avengers: Infinity War	Nominated	
Golden Trailer Awards	May 31, 2018	Best Action	"Millions" (MOCEAN)	Nominated	
Golden Trailer Awards	May 31, 2018	Best Teaser	"Balance" (MOCEAN)	Nominated	
Golden Trailer Awards	May 31, 2018	Best Original Score	"Millions" (MOCEAN)	Nominated	
Golden Trailer Awards	May 29, 2019	Best Home Ent Action	"Announce Trailer" (Tiny Hero)	Nominated	
Golden Trailer Awards	May 29, 2019	Best Home Ent Fantasy Adventure	"Announce Trailer" (Tiny Hero)	Won	
Golden Trailer Awards	May 29, 2019	Best Fantasy Adventure Poster	"Payoff One-Sheet" (Lindeman & Associates)	Nominated	
Grammy Awards	February 10, 2019	Best Instrumental Composition	Alan Silvestri for "Infinity War"	Nominated	
Guild of Music Supervisors Awards	February 13, 2019	Best Music Supervision in a Film Trailer	Sanaz Lavaedian (MOCEAN)	Nominated	
Hollywood Film Awards	November 4, 2018	Hollywood Visual Effects Award	Dan Deleeuw, Kelly Port, Russell Earl, and Dan Sudick	Honoree	
Hollywood Post Alliance Awards	November 15, 2018	Outstanding Color Grading – Feature Film	Steven J. Scott and Charles Bunnag	Nominated	
Hollywood Post Alliance Awards	November 15, 2018	Outstanding Sound – Feature Film	Shannon Mills, Daniel Laurie, Tom Johnson, and Juan Peralta	Nominated	
Hollywood Post Alliance Awards	November 15, 2018	Outstanding Visual Effects – Feature Film	Matt Aitken, Charles Tait, Paul Story, David Conley, and Marvyn Young	Won	
Hugo Awards	August 18, 2019	Best Dramatic Presentation, Long Form	Russo brothers and Christopher Markus and Stephen McFeely	Nominated	
Los Angeles Online Film Critics Society Awards	January 9, 2019	Best Action Film	Avengers: Infinity War	Nominated	
Los Angeles Online Film Critics Society Awards	January 9, 2019	Best Blockbuster	Avengers: Infinity War	Nominated	
Los Angeles Online Film Critics Society Awards	January 9, 2019	Best Visual Effects	Dan DeLeeuw, Russell Earl, Kelly Port, and Dan Sudick	Won	
Los Angeles Online Film Critics Society Awards	January 9, 2019	Best Stunt Work	Avengers: Infinity War	Nominated	
Los Angeles Online Film Critics Society Awards	January 9, 2019	Best Visual Effects or Animated Performance	Josh Brolin	Won	
Los Angeles Online Film Critics Society Midseason Awards	July 3, 2018	Best Picture	Avengers: Infinity War	Nominated	
Los Angeles Online Film Critics Society Midseason Awards	July 3, 2018	Best Supporting Actor	Josh Brolin	Nominated	
MTV Movie & TV Awards	June 18, 2018	Best Movie	Avengers: Infinity War	Nominated	
MTV Movie & TV Awards	June 18, 2018	Best Villain	Josh Brolin	Nominated	
MTV Movie & TV Awards	June 18, 2018	Best Fight	Scarlett Johansson, Danai Gurira, and Elizabeth Olsen vs. Carrie Coon	Nominated	
Nickelodeon Kids' Choice Awards	March 23, 2019	Favorite Movie	Avengers: Infinity War	Won	
Nickelodeon Kids' Choice Awards	March 23, 2019	Favorite Movie Actor	Chris Evans	Nominated	
Nickelodeon Kids' Choice Awards	March 23, 2019	Favorite Movie Actor	Chris Hemsworth	Nominated	
Nickelodeon Kids' Choice Awards	March 23, 2019	Favorite Movie Actress	Scarlett Johansson	Nominated	
Nickelodeon Kids' Choice Awards	March 23, 2019	Favorite Movie Actress	Zoe Saldaña	Nominated	
Nickelodeon Kids' Choice Awards	March 23, 2019	Favorite Superhero	Robert Downey Jr.	Won	
Nickelodeon Kids' Choice Awards	March 23, 2019	Favorite Superhero	Chris Evans	Nominated	
Nickelodeon Kids' Choice Awards	March 23, 2019	Favorite Superhero	Chris Hemsworth	Nominated	
Nickelodeon Kids' Choice Awards	March 23, 2019	Favorite Superhero	Scarlett Johansson	Nominated	
Nickelodeon Kids' Choice Awards	March 23, 2019	Favorite Butt-Kicker	Zoe Saldaña	Nominated	
People's Choice Awards	November 11, 2018	Movie of 2018	Avengers: Infinity War	Won	
People's Choice Awards	November 11, 2018	Action Movie of 2018	Avengers: Infinity War	Won	
People's Choice Awards	November 11, 2018	Male Movie Star of 2018	Robert Downey Jr.	Nominated	
People's Choice Awards	November 11, 2018	Male Movie Star of 2018	Chris Hemsworth	Nominated	
People's Choice Awards	November 11, 2018	Female Movie Star of 2018	Scarlett Johansson	Won	
People's Choice Awards	November 11, 2018	Action Movie Star of 2018	Chris Hemsworth	Nominated	
Satellite Awards	February 17, 2019	Best Visual Effects	Avengers: Infinity War	Nominated	
Saturn Awards	September 13, 2019	Best Comic-to-Film Motion Picture	Avengers: Infinity War	Nominated	
Saturn Awards	September 13, 2019	Best Supporting Actor	Josh Brolin	Won	
Screen Actors Guild Awards	January 27, 2019	Outstanding Performance by a Stunt Ensemble in a Motion Picture	Avengers: Infinity War	Nominated	
Seattle Film Critics Society Awards	December 17, 2018	Best Visual Effects	Dan DeLeeuw, Russell Earl, Kelly Port, and Dan Sudick	Nominated	
Seattle Film Critics Society Awards	December 17, 2018	Best Villain	Josh Brolin	Nominated	
St. Louis Film Critics Association Awards	December 16, 2018	Best Action Film	Avengers: Infinity War	Nominated	
St. Louis Film Critics Association Awards	December 16, 2018	Best Visual Effects	Avengers: Infinity War	Won	
St. Louis Film Critics Association Awards	December 16, 2018	Best Scene	Thor arrives in Wakanda	Nominated	
Teen Choice Awards	August 12, 2018	Choice Action Movie	Avengers: Infinity War	Won	
Teen Choice Awards	August 12, 2018	Choice Action Movie Actor	Chris Evans	Nominated	
Teen Choice Awards	August 12, 2018	Choice Action Movie Actor	Robert Downey Jr.	Won	
Teen Choice Awards	August 12, 2018	Choice Action Movie Actor	Tom Holland	Nominated	
Teen Choice Awards	August 12, 2018	Choice Action Movie Actress	Elizabeth Olsen	Nominated	
Teen Choice Awards	August 12, 2018	Choice Action Movie Actress	Scarlett Johansson	Won	
Teen Choice Awards	August 12, 2018	Choice Action Movie Actress	Zoe Saldaña	Nominated	
Teen Choice Awards	August 12, 2018	Choice Movie Villain	Josh Brolin	Nominated	
Teen Choice Awards	August 12, 2018	Choice Liplock	Chris Pratt and Zoe Saldaña	Nominated	
Teen Choice Awards	August 12, 2018	Choice Hissy Fit	Mark Ruffalo	Nominated	
Visual Effects Society Awards	February 5, 2019	Outstanding Visual Effects in a Photoreal Feature	Daniel DeLeeuw, Jen Underdahl, Kelly Port, Matt Aitken, and Dan Sudick	Won	
Visual Effects Society Awards	February 5, 2019	Outstanding Animated Character in a Photoreal Feature	Jan Philip Cramer, Darren Hendler, Paul Story, and Sidney Kombo-Kintombo for "Thanos"	Won	
Visual Effects Society Awards	February 5, 2019	Outstanding Model in a Photoreal or Animated Project	Chad Roen, Ryan Rogers, Jeff Tetzlaff, and Ming Pan for "Nidavellir Forge Megastructure"	Nominated	
Visual Effects Society Awards	February 5, 2019	Outstanding Effects Simulations in a Photoreal Feature	Gerardo Aguilera, Ashraf Ghoniem, Vasilis Pazionis, and Hartwell Durfor for "Titan"	Won	
Visual Effects Society Awards	February 5, 2019	Outstanding Effects Simulations in a Photoreal Feature	Florian Witzel, Adam Lee, Miguel Perez Senent, and Francisco Rodriguez for "Wakanda"	Nominated	
Visual Effects Society Awards	February 5, 2019	Outstanding Compositing in a Photoreal Feature	Sabine Laimer, Tim Walker, Tobias Wiesner, and Massimo Pasquetti for "Titan"	Won	
Washington D.C. Area Film Critics Association Awards	December 3, 2018	Best Motion Capture Performance	Josh Brolin	Won	
