= Avengers: Infinity War =

2018 Marvel Studios film

- Theatrical release poster
- Directed by: Anthony Russo; Joe Russo
- Screenplay by: Christopher Markus; Stephen McFeely
- Based on: Avengers by: Stan Lee; Jack Kirby
- Produced by: Kevin Feige
- Starring: Robert Downey Jr.; Chris Hemsworth; Mark Ruffalo; Chris Evans; Scarlett Johansson; Benedict Cumberbatch; Don Cheadle; Tom Holland; Chadwick Boseman; Paul Bettany; Elizabeth Olsen; Anthony Mackie; Sebastian Stan; Danai Gurira; Letitia Wright; Dave Bautista; Zoe Saldaña; Josh Brolin; Chris Pratt
- Cinematography: Trent Opaloch
- Edited by: Jeffrey Ford; Matthew Schmidt
- Music by: Alan Silvestri
- Production company: Marvel Studios
- Distributed by: Walt Disney Studios Motion Pictures
- Release dates: April 23, 2018 (Dolby Theatre); April 27, 2018 (United States)
- Running time: 149 minutes
- Country: United States
- Language: English
- Budget: $325–400 million
- Box office: $2.052 billion

Avengers: Infinity War is a 2018 American superhero film based on the Marvel Comics superhero team the Avengers. Produced by Marvel Studios and distributed by Walt Disney Studios Motion Pictures, it is the sequel to The Avengers (2012) and Avengers: Age of Ultron (2015), and the 19th film in the Marvel Cinematic Universe (MCU). Directed by Anthony and Joe Russo and written by Christopher Markus and Stephen McFeely, the film features an ensemble cast including Robert Downey Jr., Chris Hemsworth, Mark Ruffalo, Chris Evans, Scarlett Johansson, Benedict Cumberbatch, Don Cheadle, Tom Holland, Chadwick Boseman, Paul Bettany, Elizabeth Olsen, Anthony Mackie, Sebastian Stan, Danai Gurira, Letitia Wright, Dave Bautista, Zoe Saldaña, Josh Brolin, and Chris Pratt. In the film, the Avengers and the Guardians of the Galaxy attempt to stop Thanos (Brolin) from collecting the six powerful Infinity Stones as part of his quest to kill half of all life in the universe.

The film was announced in October 2014 as Avengers: Infinity War – Part 1. The Russo brothers came on board to direct in April 2015, and a month later, Markus and McFeely signed on to write the script for the film, which draws inspiration from Jim Starlin's 1991 comic book The Infinity Gauntlet and Jonathan Hickman's 2013 comic book Infinity. In 2016, Marvel shortened the title to Avengers: Infinity War. Filming began in January 2017 at Pinewood Atlanta Studios in Fayette County, Georgia, with a large cast consisting mostly of actors reprising their roles from previous MCU films, including Brolin as Thanos. The production lasted until July 2017, shooting back-to-back with a direct sequel, Avengers: Endgame (2019). Additional filming took place in Scotland, the Downtown Atlanta area, and New York City. With an estimated budget of $325–400 million, the film is one of the most expensive films ever made.

Avengers: Infinity War premiered at the Dolby Theatre in Hollywood, Los Angeles, on April 23, 2018, and was released in the United States on April 27 as part of Phase Three of the MCU. The film received positive reviews from critics, with praise for Brolin's performance and the Russo brothers' direction, as well as the visual effects, action sequences, dark tone, and musical score. It was a major box-office success, becoming the fourth film and the first superhero film to gross over $2 billion worldwide, breaking numerous box office records, and becoming the highest-grossing film of 2018 and the fourth-highest-grossing film at the time of its release both worldwide and in the United States and Canada. It received a nomination for Best Visual Effects at the 91st Academy Awards, among numerous other accolades. The sequel, Avengers: Endgame, was released in April 2019.

== Plot ==
Having acquired the Power Stone—one of six Infinity Stones—from the planet Xandar, Thanos and his lieutenants—Ebony Maw, Cull Obsidian, Proxima Midnight, and Corvus Glaive—intercept the spaceship carrying the survivors of Asgard's destruction. (Note: As depicted in Thor: Ragnarok (2017)) After subduing Thor, Thanos extracts the Space Stone from the Tesseract, overpowers the Hulk, kills Loki, and fatally wounds Heimdall. Before dying, Heimdall sends Hulk to Earth using the Bifröst. Thanos and his lieutenants leave, destroying the ship.

Hulk crash-lands in the Sanctum Sanctorum in New York City, reverting to the form of Bruce Banner. He warns Stephen Strange and Wong about Thanos's plan to destroy half of all life in the universe, and they recruit Tony Stark. Maw and Obsidian arrive to retrieve the Time Stone from Strange, drawing Peter Parker's attention. Maw, unable to take the Time Stone due to Strange's enchantment, captures him. Stark and Parker sneak aboard Maw's spaceship while Wong stays behind to guard the Sanctum.

The Guardians of the Galaxy respond to the Asgardian ship's distress call and rescue Thor. Thor surmises that Thanos is after the Reality Stone, which Taneleer Tivan possesses on Knowhere. He travels with Rocket and Groot to Nidavellir to enlist the dwarf king Eitri's aid in creating the battle-axe Stormbreaker. Peter Quill, Gamora, Drax, and Mantis travel to Knowhere, finding Thanos already has the Reality Stone. Thanos kidnaps Gamora, who discloses the Soul Stone's location to save Nebula from torture. On Vormir, the Stone's keeper, Red Skull, tells Thanos that he can only acquire it by sacrificing someone he loves. Thanos sacrifices Gamora, earning the Stone.

Midnight and Glaive ambush Wanda Maximoff and Vision in Edinburgh to retrieve the Mind Stone, which is in Vision's forehead. Steve Rogers, Natasha Romanoff, and Sam Wilson rescue them and they take shelter with James Rhodes and Banner at the Avengers Compound. Vision asks Wanda to destroy him and the Mind Stone to keep it from Thanos, but she refuses. The group travels to Wakanda, which Rogers believes has the resources to remove the Stone without killing Vision.

Nebula escapes captivity and asks the remaining Guardians to meet her on Thanos's destroyed homeworld, Titan. Stark and Parker kill Maw and rescue Strange. The trio crash-lands on Titan, where they meet Quill, Drax, and Mantis. Using the Time Stone, Strange views millions of possible futures, seeing only one in which the Avengers win. The group formulates a plan to subdue Thanos and remove the Infinity Gauntlet, with which he safely houses and wields the Stones. Thanos appears, justifying his plans as necessary to guarantee the survival of an overpopulated universe. Nebula arrives soon after and helps the others subdue Thanos, but deduces that Thanos has killed Gamora. Enraged, Quill attacks Thanos, allowing him to break the group's hold and overpower them. Thanos grievously wounds Stark, but Strange offers the Time Stone in exchange for sparing Stark's life.

In Wakanda, Rogers reunites with Bucky Barnes before Thanos' army invades. The Avengers, along with T'Challa and the Wakandan forces, mount a defense while Shuri works to extract the Mind Stone from Vision. Unable to summon the Hulk, Banner fights in Stark's Hulkbuster armor. Thor, Rocket, and Groot arrive to reinforce the Avengers. Together they kill Midnight, Obsidian, and Glaive, and rout Thanos's army. Shuri cannot complete the extraction before Thanos arrives on the field; the Avengers and their allies fail to stop him from reaching Vision. Vision convinces a reluctant Wanda to destroy him and the Mind Stone, but Thanos uses the Time Stone to reverse her actions, rip the stone from Vision's forehead, and complete the Gauntlet. Thor severely wounds Thanos with Stormbreaker, but Thanos activates the completed Gauntlet by snapping his fingers before teleporting away.

Half of all life across the universe disintegrates, including Barnes, T'Challa, Groot, Wanda, Wilson, Mantis, Drax, Quill, Strange, Parker, Maria Hill, and Nick Fury, the last of whom sends an emergency signal on a modified pager before disintegrating. (Note: Identified off-screen as a message to Carol Danvers / Captain Marvel.) Stark and Nebula remain stranded on Titan while Banner, M'Baku, Okoye, Rhodes, Rocket, Rogers, Romanoff, and Thor are left on the Wakandan battlefield. Meanwhile, Thanos watches a sunrise on a remote planet.

== Cast ==
- Robert Downey Jr. as Tony Stark / Iron Man:
  The benefactor of the Avengers who is a self-described genius, billionaire, playboy, and philanthropist with electromechanical suits of armor of his own making. Co-director Joe Russo explained that Stark "senses this greater threat approaching, so he is doing everything in his power to keep the Earth safe". Downey added that Stark has smaller goals than in previous films.
- Chris Hemsworth as Thor:
  An Avenger and the king of Asgard, based on the Norse mythological deity of the same name. Joe Russo stated that Thor's storyline picks up after the events of Thor: Ragnarok (2017), which finds him in a "very profound", "very interesting place" with "real emotional motivation". At the recommendation of Hemsworth, writers Christopher Markus and Stephen McFeely consulted Thor: Ragnarok director Taika Waititi and screenwriter Eric Pearson to help carry over the comedic and tragic elements of the re-toned Thor from that film. Joe Russo said that Thor has "the driving hero's arc of the movie which stands in direct opposition to Thanos' argument" and would have been the main protagonist of the film had Thor killed Thanos.
- Mark Ruffalo as Bruce Banner / Hulk:
  An Avenger and genius scientist who, because of exposure to gamma radiation, typically transforms into a monster when enraged or agitated. Banner spends the film trying to reintegrate with the Avengers and "impress upon everybody how dangerous Thanos is". Joe Russo felt the Hulk refusing to appear for much of the film was only partially because he was scared, but also because he realizes that "Banner only wants Hulk for fighting. I think he's had enough of saving Banner's ass". Russo added that this was "really reflective of the journey from Ragnarok [...] [where] these two characters are constantly in conflict with each other over control". Banner's appearance in the film continues a story arc for the character that was established in Thor: Ragnarok and concludes in Avengers: Endgame (2019), with the difference between Hulk and Banner "starting to blur a little bit". Ruffalo described Hulk in Infinity War as having the mental capacity of a five-year-old.
- Chris Evans as Steve Rogers / Captain America:
  The fugitive leader of the non-regulation faction of Avengers. A World War II veteran, he was enhanced to the peak of human physicality by an experimental serum and frozen in suspended animation before waking up in the modern world. Joe Russo said after the events of Captain America: Civil War (2016), Rogers struggles with the conflict between his responsibility to himself and his responsibility to others. The character embodies the "spirit" of the comic book identity Nomad in the film, and receives new vibranium gauntlets from Shuri to replace his old shield. An early draft of the film had Rogers first appearing at the end of the film to save Vision from Corvus Glaive in Wakanda. Markus and McFeely were called "insane" for waiting that long to introduce Rogers into the film and ultimately conceded it was "not [a] satisfying" approach.
- Scarlett Johansson as Natasha Romanoff / Black Widow:
  A highly trained spy, member of Rogers' faction of Avengers, and former agent of S.H.I.E.L.D. Johansson said that Romanoff's situation following Captain America: Civil War has been "a dark time. I wouldn't say that my character has been particularly hopeful, but I think she's hardened even more than she probably was before."
- Benedict Cumberbatch as Dr. Stephen Strange:
  A former neurosurgeon who, after a car accident that led to a journey of healing, discovered the hidden world of magic and alternate dimensions and became a Master of the Mystic Arts. Markus and McFeely described Strange as "[ending] up being the reasonable adult in the room" with the "widest perspective available". Julian "JayFunk" Daniels once again assisted Cumberbatch with his finger-tutting movements.
- Don Cheadle as James "Rhodey" Rhodes / War Machine:
  An officer in the U.S. Air Force and Avenger who operates the War Machine armor. Following his paralysis during the events of Civil War, Rhodes is given an apparatus by Stark to walk again, although he is reluctant to don his War Machine armor and rejoin the Avengers due to his injury. Cheadle believed that Rhodes is "negotiating this reunion and his rejoining this team". He also explained that Rhodes' relationship with Stark "deepened" from his accident, saying, "I think Tony feels somewhat responsible and culpable in a way. But again, he's always had my back in a way that only he could really have".
- Tom Holland as Peter Parker / Spider-Man:
  A teenager, Avenger and Stark's protégé who received spider-like abilities after being bitten by a radioactive spider. Downey helped coach Holland through his death scene, which was not as drawn out in the script.
- Chadwick Boseman as T'Challa / Black Panther:
  The king of the African nation of Wakanda who gained his enhanced abilities by ingesting the Heart-Shaped Herb. Boseman, along with the other actors from Black Panther (2018) portraying Wakandans, improvised their war chants on set ahead of the battle in Wakanda. Despite both Black Panther and Infinity War filming at the same time, the Russos were not aware of the chants, as they had not yet seen footage from Black Panther, and felt the moment was "incredibly cool".
- Paul Bettany as Vision:
  An android and Avenger created using the artificial intelligence J.A.R.V.I.S., Ultron, and the Mind Stone. Anthony Russo called Vision "a living MacGuffin"; his life being in direct conflict with Thanos' quest, which "raises the stakes".
- Elizabeth Olsen as Wanda Maximoff: A member of Rogers' faction of Avengers who can harness magic and engage in hypnosis and telekinesis.
- Anthony Mackie as Sam Wilson / Falcon: A member of Rogers' faction of Avengers and former pararescueman trained by the military in aerial combat using a specially designed wing pack.
- Sebastian Stan as Bucky Barnes / Winter Soldier:
  An enhanced soldier and Rogers' ally and best friend who reemerged as a brainwashed assassin after being thought to have been killed in action during World War II. Barnes, formerly known as the Winter Soldier, is given the name White Wolf by the people of Wakanda, who helped remove his Hydra programming.
- Tom Hiddleston as Loki:
  Thor's adopted brother, based on the Norse mythological deity of the same name. Hiddleston knew about Loki's death in Infinity War prior to production of Thor: Ragnarok after meeting the Russos in May 2016, with his death being the first scene of the film that the Russos had conceptualized. Hiddleston's knowledge of Loki's fate in Infinity War influenced his portrayal in Ragnarok. On Loki's final moments, Hiddleston believed it was "very powerful" that Loki calls himself "Odinson", as it was a moment that "closes the whole journey of Loki", while his death "takes the stakes up dramatically", establishing the threat of Thanos.
- Idris Elba as Heimdall: The all-seeing, all-hearing Asgardian and former sentry of the Bifröst Bridge, based on the Norse mythological deity of the same name.
- Peter Dinklage as Eitri: King of the Dwarves of Nidavellir, and weaponsmith, based on the Norse mythological dwarf of the same name.
- Benedict Wong as Wong: A Master of the Mystic Arts, tasked with protecting some of Kamar-Taj's most valuable relics and books.
- Pom Klementieff as Mantis: A member of the Guardians with empathic powers.
- Karen Gillan as Nebula: An adopted daughter of Thanos who was raised with Gamora as siblings.
- Dave Bautista as Drax the Destroyer:
  A member of the Guardians and warrior in search of vengeance against Thanos for killing his family. At the end of each day of filming, Bautista would have to sit in a sauna to remove his makeup.
- Zoe Saldaña as Gamora: A member of the Guardians who is an orphan from an alien world and was subsequently raised by Thanos, and is seeking redemption for her past crimes. Ariana Greenblatt portrays a young Gamora.
- Vin Diesel as Groot:
  A member of the Guardians who is a tree-like humanoid. Executive producer James Gunn explained that Groot is still an adolescent in the film, in the same state of growth seen in one of the post-credit scenes in Guardians of the Galaxy Vol. 2 (2017). Terry Notary provided motion capture for Groot, and said the character is "coming of age, so you'll see the teenager find a mentor to look up to and to model himself after".
- Bradley Cooper as Rocket:
  A member of the Guardians who is a genetically engineered raccoon-based bounty hunter, mercenary, and master of weapons and battle tactics. Sean Gunn was again the stand-in for Rocket during filming, with his acting and expressions serving as motion reference for the character.
- Gwyneth Paltrow as Pepper Potts:
  Stark's fiancée and the CEO of Stark Industries. Downey felt that "Pepper remains the heart of the [Iron Man] story", which was not a focal point in some of the preceding films with Stark. Downey continued that "we wanted to get back to that reality. Not just for them, but let's really see how that can add to the something-worth-fighting-for of it all".
- Benicio del Toro as Taneleer Tivan / The Collector: One of the Elders of the Universe who is an obsessive keeper of the largest collection of interstellar fauna, relics, and species of all manner in the galaxy.
- Josh Brolin as Thanos:
  An intergalactic warlord from Titan who seeks all six Infinity Stones to destroy half of all life for the sake of "re-balanc[ing] the universe". Producer Kevin Feige added that Thanos believes the universe is becoming over-populated, which led to the destruction of his home moon Titan and is something he vowed not to let happen again, and also said "you could almost go so far as to say he is the main character of" the film. McFeely shared this sentiment, describing the film as his "hero journey" in addition to being the film's protagonist, stating, "Part of that is the things that [mean] the most to him. We wanted to show that. It wasn't just power; it wasn't just an ideal; it was people". Brolin likened Thanos to "the Quasimodo of this time" and the novel Perfume, since Thanos was born deformed and considered a "freak" on Titan, while Joe Russo would reference The Godfather (1972) for Brolin at times, which Brolin felt helped "to emotionalize the whole thing". Brolin further added that he preferred playing Thanos over Cable in Deadpool 2 (2018) because of the amount of work that went into creating the character. Thanos does not wear armor for most of the film, which is symbolic of his growing power as he collects the Infinity Stones. In addition to voicing for the character, Brolin performed motion capture on set.
- Chris Pratt as Peter Quill / Star-Lord:
  The half-human, half-Celestial leader of the Guardians who was abducted from Earth as a child and raised by a group of alien thieves and smugglers called the Ravagers. Pratt described his role in the film as a "guest star" appearance and said "you get to be a little more vibrant; a little more irreverent; a little bit more colorful if you want it to be".

Additionally, several other actors reprise their MCU roles: Danai Gurira as Okoye, the head of the Dora Milaje; Letitia Wright as T'Challa's sister Shuri; William Hurt as Thaddeus Ross, the U.S. Secretary of State; Kerry Condon as the voice of Stark's AI F.R.I.D.A.Y.; Winston Duke as M'Baku, the leader of Wakanda's mountain tribe the Jabari; Florence Kasumba as Ayo, a member of the Dora Milaje; Jacob Batalon as Parker's friend Ned; Isabella Amara as Parker's classmate Sally; Tiffany Espensen as Parker's classmate Cindy; and Ethan Dizon as Parker's classmate Tiny. Samuel L. Jackson and Cobie Smulders make uncredited cameos as Nick Fury and Maria Hill, the former director and deputy director of S.H.I.E.L.D., respectively, in the film's post-credits scene.

Thanos' henchmen, known collectively in the comics as the Black Order and in the film as the "Children of Thanos", include Terry Notary as Cull Obsidian, Tom Vaughan-Lawlor as Ebony Maw, Carrie Coon as Proxima Midnight, and Michael James Shaw as Corvus Glaive. The foursome provided voices and motion-capture performances on set for their characters. As Coon was pregnant during filming, she mainly did facial capture for Proxima Midnight with some motion-capture, with stuntwoman Monique Ganderton standing-in and providing the rest on set. Ebony Maw's look was inspired by the Marvel Comics character Mephisto, who appeared in the Infinity Gauntlet storyline.

Ross Marquand voices Johann Schmidt / Red Skull, the "Stonekeeper" and former Nazi commander of Hydra during World War II. Marquand replaces Hugo Weaving, who had expressed reluctance to reprise the character from Captain America: The First Avenger (2011). Red Skull was created through CGI and portrayed with stand-ins on set. Avengers co-creator Stan Lee makes a cameo appearance in the film as Parker's school bus driver, while screenwriter Stephen McFeely cameos as Secretary Ross' aide. Kenneth Branagh, the director of Thor (2011), voices an Asgardian distress caller in an uncredited cameo. David Cross was invited to make a cameo appearance as Tobias Fünke, his character from the television sitcom Arrested Development, which the Russo brothers had previously worked on; this was prevented by a scheduling conflict, but Fünke still appears in the film as a specimen in the Collector's collection, played by an uncredited extra. Executive producer Jon Favreau was to reprise his role as Happy Hogan, while co-director Joe Russo had a cameo appearance as a paparazzi photographer, but this scene did not make the theatrical cut of the film.

== Production ==
In October 2014, Marvel Studios announced a two-part sequel to Avengers: Age of Ultron (2015) entitled Avengers: Infinity War. Part 1 was scheduled to be released on May 4, 2018, with Part 2 scheduled for May 3, 2019. Marvel's plan was to film both parts of Infinity War back-to-back. Anthony and Joe Russo were hired to direct the films in April 2015. The next month, Christopher Markus and Stephen McFeely signed on to write the screenplays for both parts of the film, which drew inspiration from Jim Starlin's 1991 The Infinity Gauntlet comic and Jonathan Hickman's 2013 Infinity comic. Anthony Russo added the film was inspired by 1990s heist films, with Thanos "on a smash-and-grab" to acquire all of the Infinity Stones. Producer Kevin Feige said the films would be "two distinct" projects with shared elements, not one story split across two films. The Russos decided to rename them to remove this misconception in May 2016, and Marvel simply shortened the first film to Avengers: Infinity War that July.

Principal photography began on January 23, 2017, under the working title Mary Lou, at Pinewood Atlanta Studios in Fayette County, Georgia, with Trent Opaloch as director of photography. Infinity War and Avengers: Endgame were shot using ARRI Alexa IMAX 2D cameras, thus marking the first time that a Hollywood feature film was shot entirely with IMAX digital cameras. In early February, Marvel confirmed the involvement of Robert Downey Jr. as Tony Stark / Iron Man, Chris Pratt as Peter Quill / Star-Lord, and Tom Holland as Peter Parker / Spider-Man in the film. Additional filming took place in Scotland beginning in February 2017. The filming occurred in Edinburgh, Glasgow, and the Scottish Highlands, with studio work taking place at Wardpark Studios in Cumbernauld. In late June 2017, filming occurred in Downtown Atlanta, as well as Atlanta's Central Park in early July, before moving to Queens, New York in the middle of the month. Filming concluded on July 14, 2017. For the film's final scene, where Thanos settles in a nipa hut, the filmmakers worked with Thailand-based studio Indochina Productions to acquire footage of the Banaue Rice Terraces at Ifugao, Philippines.

Later in July 2017, Joe Russo stated there were a couple of unfinished scenes for Infinity War that would be shot "in the next few months". In early March 2018, Disney moved the release of Infinity War in the United States to April 27, 2018, to have it be released the same weekend as some of its international markets. Visual effects for the film were created by Industrial Light & Magic, Framestore, Method Studios, Weta Digital, DNEG, Cinesite, Digital Domain, Rise, Lola VFX, and Perception. With an estimated budget in the range of $325–400 million, it is one of the most expensive films ever made. Evans and Hemsworth both earned $15 million for the film.

== Music ==
In June 2016, Alan Silvestri, who composed the score for The Avengers (2012), was revealed to be returning to score both Infinity War and Endgame. Silvestri recorded his score from January 2018 to late March, and found working on the film to be "a really different experience than anything I'd done before, especially in regard to the approach and balancing quick shifts in tone". Ludwig Göransson's theme from Black Panther is used in the film. Hollywood Records and Marvel Music released regular and deluxe soundtrack albums digitally on April 27, 2018, with physical releases on May 18. The deluxe edition featured some extended and additional tracks.

== Marketing ==
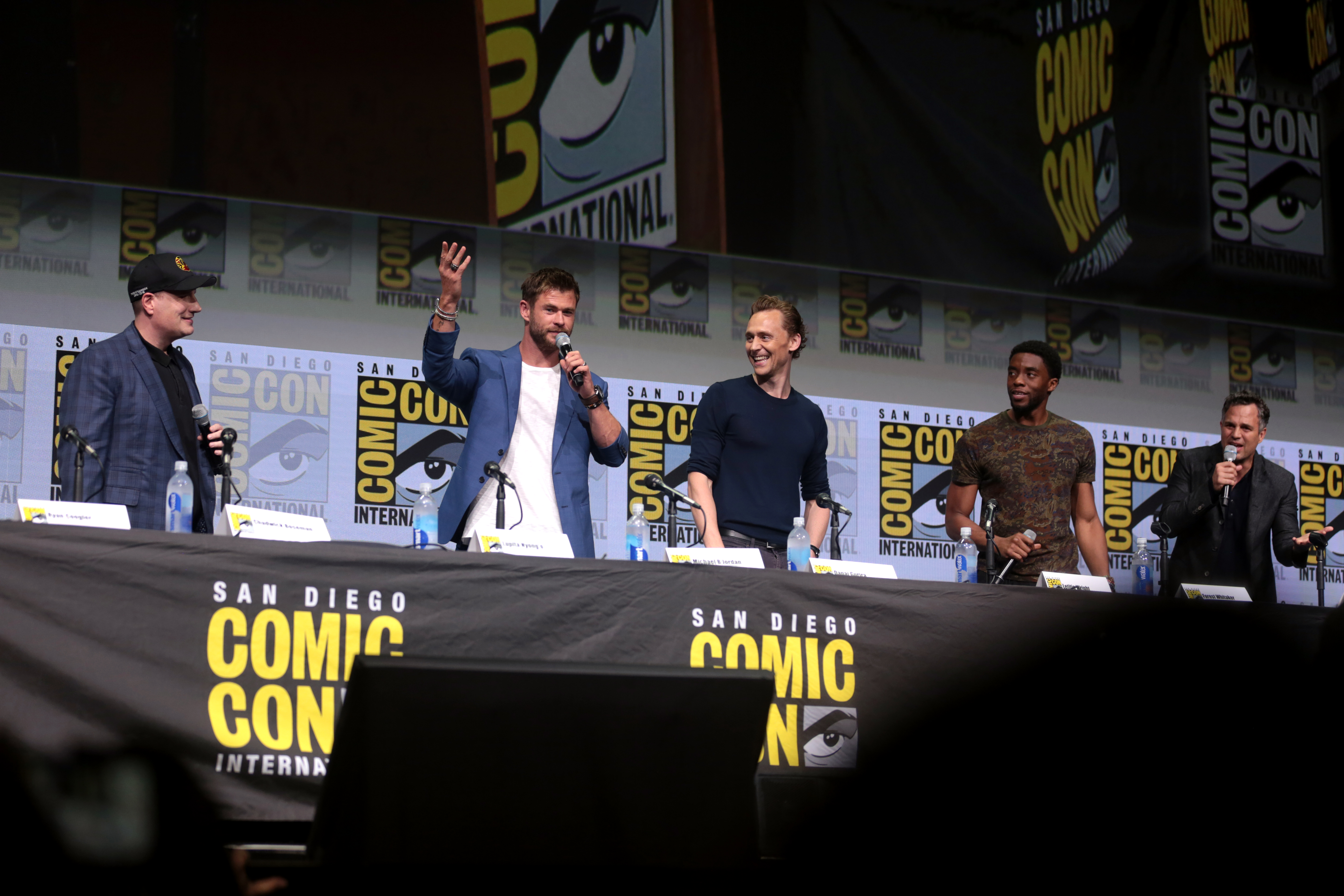
From left to right: Kevin Feige, Chris Hemsworth, Tom Hiddleston, Chadwick Boseman, and Mark Ruffalo at the 2017 San Diego Comic-Con

In May 2017, Robert Downey Jr. and his philanthropic organization Random Act Funding partnered with Omaze for a contest in which a randomly chosen winner from those that donated would receive an Infinity War set visit. A life-sized statue of Thanos, created by Legacy Effects, was on display at D23 Expo 2017, alongside statues of the Black Order / "Children of Thanos": Corvus Glaive, Proxima Midnight, Ebony Maw, and Cull Obsidian. Additionally, Feige, Joe Russo, Downey, Brolin, Bettany, Olsen, Klementieff, Gillan, Bautista, Cheadle, Mackie, Cumberbatch, Stan, Holland, Boseman, Ruffalo, and Hemsworth appeared at D23 Expo to present a clip highlighting the 10 years of MCU films, along with footage from Infinity War. The footage, which was screened exclusively for the panel, received strong audience reaction, with fans "literally on their feet and jumping as the footage played". Julia Alexander of Polygon said there was "quite a bit happening" in the footage and it "finally feels like Marvel has made the movie it always wanted to—and the one we've always wanted to see." CinemaBlend's Eric Eisenberg said the footage left him "literally shaking", with the film looking "like it could be one of the most epic blockbusters ever created". Haleigh Foutch for Collider described it as "dark and dramatic, and utterly epic. It's clear Marvel is trying to do something different here [...] to pay off a decade's worth of narrative and world-building. While it's impossible to tell from two minutes work of footage, it certainly looks like that gamble paid off". The D23 footage was also shown at the 2017 San Diego Comic-Con. After the two convention presentations, Avengers: Infinity War generated over 90,000 new conversations on social media from July 17 to 23, the third-most during that time period behind Thor: Ragnarok and Justice League (2017), according to Comscore and its PreAct service. Infinity War stayed in third the following week, with over 41,000 new social media conversations, behind Ragnarok and It (2017). By the week of October 16, Infinity War had generated over 679,000 total social media conversations.

To promote the film's first teaser trailer, Marvel released a compilation video of some of its previous trailers since Iron Man (2008), "paired with fan reaction videos to those trailers". The first teaser for Avengers: Infinity War debuted on Good Morning America on November 29, 2017. Josh Spiegel of The Hollywood Reporter said, "The most important part of the trailer is how it carefully, deliberately introduces the notion that the Infinity War films are going to function as a passing of the torch, from one set of Avengers to a newer group". Scott Mendelson, writing for Forbes, noted that even though the trailer was not much different from the convention footage screened earlier in the year, it was "damn impressive." Additionally, the trailer had an "excellent effect", using the "Avengers Initiative speech" by Nick Fury and the "Avengers theme" by Alan Silvestri from The Avengers. Conversely to Mendelson, Alexander commented on the different marketing strategy for the film between the convention footage scenes and the trailer scenes, feeling the "two couldn't be more different". She said the convention footage (intended to please the crowd who were "jittery with anticipation") was released between Guardians of the Galaxy Vol. 2 and Thor: Ragnarok, and heavily focused Thor and the Guardians, while the trailer (designed to explain the film to general audiences) heavily features Black Panther and Wakanda, which Alexander said could not have been done before the additional marketing for Black Panther that happened after the conventions provided additional context. Gael Cooper of CNET observed that the trailer was viewed nearly 500,000 times in its first 15 minutes after it was posted on YouTube, but questioned if the trailer broke the site after the view counter appeared to be stuck at 467,331. The trailer was viewed 230 million times in its first 24 hours, becoming the most viewed trailer in that time period, surpassing the record of It.

In January 2018, Marvel Comics published a two-issue prequel comic titled Avengers: Infinity War Prelude, which serves as a bridge between Captain America: Civil War and Avengers: Infinity War. A commercial for Infinity War aired during Super Bowl LII, and generated the most social media buzz of all the films advertised according to comScore and United Talent Agency; it was viewed 17.6 million times across YouTube and Facebook. On February 27, Disney and Marvel announced the "Marvel: The Universe Unites" charity campaign leading to the release of merchandise for the film on March 3. The week-long event saw stars from the film create social media challenges to provide funds and raise awareness for charities that support children and families impacted by serious illness. Marvel planned to make a $250,000 donation to Starlight Children's Foundation if these posts collectively reached 1 million likes, while Disney planned to donate 10% of all Marvel's Disney Store sales in the United States and online on the weekend of March 3 to the Make-A-Wish Foundation, up to $50,000. Hasbro and Funko each donated $1 million worth of cash and products, to Give Kids the World Village and Starlight Children's Foundation, respectively.

A second trailer was released on March 16, which earned over 1 million views on YouTube in less than three hours after it was released. Alyssa Rosenberg of The Washington Post was not overly enthused about another superhero film having "special-effects-heavy villains, or the sight of yet another mysterious object hanging over the Manhattan skyline", but felt the trailer made her realize "that I'm actually looking forward to seeing [the characters of the MCU] get to know each other". Spiegel agreed with Rosenberg about the potential for character interactions, but felt it was "gimmicky" to have so many "crossover-style introductions or combinations of heroes in a movie like this". The second trailer was viewed 179 million times in the first 24 hours, the third-most viewed trailer in that time period, behind the first trailer for the film and It, while also becoming the biggest release for a second trailer, surpassing Beauty and the Beast (2017) (128 million views). A week before the film's release, the Burj Khalifa in Dubai was lit up each night for the film, counting down to its release. Marvel also featured tie-in events across seven of their mobile games to promote the film. In early May, Marvel and Epic Games announced the "Infinity Gauntlet Limited Time Mashup" mode for Fortnite Battle Royale, where players could find the Infinity Gauntlet hidden on the game map and become Thanos with added abilities. The Russo brothers were fans of Fortnite and approached Donald Mustard, the worldwide creative director of Epic Games, about the potential for a crossover between the properties. On November 20, Little, Brown and Company published Marvel's Avengers: Infinity War: Thanos – Titan Consumed, written by Barry Lyga. Despite not existing within Marvel Studios' MCU canon, the novel explores the origins of Thanos before the events of the film. Lyga spoke with Marvel Studios to get an "outline of who Thanos is and what he means to the movies", and "was given great latitude and a free hand [in some areas of the story], while in others I had to tip-toe very carefully through the MCU".

All-in-all, the studio spent an estimated $150 million on prints and advertisements promoting the film. Additional marketing partners for the film included Coca-Cola, Quicken Loans and their Rocket Mortgage service, the Infiniti QX50 (which appears in the film), Ziploc, Go-Gurt, Yoplait, Synchrony Bank, American Airlines, and Stand Up to Cancer. The partners created television commercials "inspired by or featuring the film's characters and themes", interactive digital initiatives, and robust in-store presences at numerous retailers. Duracell, Unilever, Quaker Oats Company, Chevron, and Samsung ran promotions in smaller markets. Coca-Cola, Ziploc, Go-Gurt, and Yoplait created special packaging in support of the film, with Synchrony implementing a "Save Like a Hero" campaign, and Stand Up to Cancer and American Airlines launching a national campaign with a PSA starring Johansson and Hemsworth. In the United Kingdom, OnePlus released an Infinity War edition for one of their smartphones. Deadline Hollywood estimated the media value was $150 million, the largest for any Marvel film, with Coca-Cola contributing an estimated $40 million.

== Release ==
=== Theatrical ===
Avengers: Infinity War held its world premiere at the Dolby Theatre in Hollywood, Los Angeles, on April 23, 2018, screening also at the adjacent El Capitan Theatre and Grauman's Chinese Theatre. It was released in most countries worldwide, including the United States, on April 27, with a few debuts beginning as early as April 25, and was shown in IMAX and 3D on select screens. In the United States, the film opened in 4,474 theaters, 408 of which were IMAX; this was the widest release for a Disney title ever and the second-widest ever after Despicable Me 3's (2017) 4,529 theaters. Three of AMC Theatres' locations screened the film for 24 hours straight, with 53 of their locations having showtimes at either 2 am or 3 am to accommodate demand. In India, the film had the biggest release ever for a Hollywood film, opening on nearly 2,000 screens in four languages. The film also screened in 515 4DX theaters in 59 countries. Avengers: Infinity War was originally scheduled to be released on May 4 in the United States. The Chinese release of the film, which opened on May 11, was originally scheduled to end on June 10, but was granted a "rare" extension of 30 days, to end on July 9. Avengers: Infinity War is part of Phase Three of the MCU.

Select footage from the film was screened in various cities during the film's press tour in early April, ahead of the Los Angeles premiere. The Russos said only a limited amount of the film would be shown at these screenings to reduce the chance of spoilers being leaked. Adam Chitwood of Collider commented that this was "highly unusual as most Marvel movies are screened in their entirety for press about a month before they hit theaters". Ahead of the United States release, AMC Theatres in New York City and Orlando, Florida aired an eleven-MCU film marathon beginning on April 25, ending in a screening of Infinity War. The El Capitan Theatre in Los Angeles had a similar marathon for the film's release.

=== Home media ===
Avengers: Infinity War was released on digital download by Walt Disney Studios Home Entertainment on July 31, 2018, and on Ultra HD Blu-ray, Blu-ray, and DVD on August 14. The digital and Blu-ray releases include behind-the-scenes featurettes, audio commentary, deleted scenes, and a blooper reel. The digital release also features a roundtable discussion between MCU directors the Russos, Jon Favreau, Joss Whedon, James Gunn, Ryan Coogler, Peyton Reed, and Taika Waititi. In terms of home media sales, the physical versions of the film were collectively the top home media release of the week in which they were first released.

Despite being shot with IMAX cameras and released in IMAX theaters in the 1.90:1 aspect ratio, the home media release did not present the film in that aspect ratio, instead including a cropped 2.39:1 aspect ratio that was used for non-IMAX screenings. Joe Russo said they "spent a long time trying to" have the IMAX version on the home media, but since the IMAX Corporation has "agency over that format", the situation was "complicated". He did not rule out the possibility that this version could be available at a later point. The IMAX Enhanced version of the film was made available on Disney+ beginning on November 12, 2021.

== Reception ==
=== Box office ===
Avengers: Infinity War grossed $678.8 million in the United States and Canada, and $1.374 billion in other territories, for a worldwide total of $2.052 billion, becoming the fourth-highest-grossing film of all time, the highest-grossing film of 2018, the highest-grossing MCU film, and the highest-grossing superhero film.

Its worldwide opening weekend of $640.5 million was the biggest of all time, beating The Fate of the Furious's (2017) $541.9 million. It was later beat by its sequel, Avengers: Endgame, which grossed $1.222 billion in its opening weekend. It was the fastest film to make $1 billion at the worldwide box office, doing so in 11 days to eclipse Star Wars: The Force Awakens's (2015) record of 12 days. Also, in its second weekend, Infinity War passed $13.5 million from 4DX screens, which was the all-time record for the format. On June 12, 2018, Infinity War passed the $2 billion mark at the worldwide box office, becoming the fourth film to cross that milestone after Avatar (2009), Titanic (1997), and The Force Awakens. Crossing the mark in 48 days, it was the second-fastest to that point, after Avatar's 47-day record and later the 11-day record of Endgame. With $140 million worldwide from IMAX, the film is the third-largest worldwide in the format, behind Avatar and The Force Awakens, and the largest for a Marvel film. Deadline Hollywood calculated the film's net profit as $500 million, accounting for production budgets, marketing, talent participations, and other costs; box office grosses and home media revenues placed it first on their list of 2018's "Most Valuable Blockbusters".

==== Pre-sale ticket records ====
In December 2017, a survey from Fandango indicated that Infinity War was the most anticipated film of 2018. Fandango later reported that Infinity War achieved the largest initial 24-hour ticket pre-sales for a superhero film, taking just 6 hours to surpass the previous 24-hour record set by Black Panther. Atom Tickets reported that Infinity War sold more tickets in its first pre-sales day than Black Panther sold in its first month. Within 72 hours, the film generated the largest pre-sales for any superhero film at AMC Theatres, with its advance ticket sales being 257.6% ahead of Black Panther's, 751.5% ahead of Captain America: Civil War, and 1,106.5% ahead of Avengers: Age of Ultron during the same time frame. Two weeks before its release, Fandango revealed that advance ticket sales for Infinity War were outpacing the last seven MCU films combined in the same timeframe, and had become the company's top April release. It was also on pace to become the top superhero film. A week before the film released, The Wall Street Journal said the film had sold more than $50 million worth of advance tickets, behind only The Force Awakens and Star Wars: The Last Jedi (2017), with Fandango reporting that more than 2,500 showtimes had sold out. On Atom Tickets, Infinity War had the most pre-sale volume, selling 7% higher than The Last Jedi and 250% higher than Black Panther at the same point in their sales. Atom also reported that ticket sales for Infinity War were doubling daily the week of its release, the fastest rate of increase the service has seen for any MCU title.

==== United States and Canada ====
Avengers: Infinity War earned $106.7 million on its opening day in the United States and Canada (including $39 million from Thursday night previews), for an opening weekend total of $258.2 million. The Thursday night preview earning was the best for an MCU film (beating Avengers: Age of Ultron's $27.6 million) and the fourth-best of all time, behind The Force Awakens ($57 million), The Last Jedi ($45 million), and Harry Potter and the Deathly Hallows – Part 2 (2011) ($43.5 million). Fandango reported that $14 million of the $39 million came from ticket pre-sales from the company. The opening day gross was the second-best ever, behind The Force Awakens's $119.1 million; its Saturday gross of $83 million was the best-ever Saturday gross, beating Jurassic World's (2015) $69.6 million; and its Sunday gross of $69.2 million was the best-ever, beating The Force Awakens's $60.5 million. The total weekend gross became the highest-grossing opening weekend, beating The Force Awakens's $248 million. IMAX contributed $22.5 million to the opening weekend gross, which was the best opening for a Marvel film in the format and the third-biggest opening, behind The Force Awakens ($30 million) and The Last Jedi ($24.7 million). AMC reported that the film had the highest Friday and Saturday box office gross for a single title in the company's history, while Fandango reported that approximately $84 million worth of tickets were sold through the service, approximately 30%, which was the largest share of the weekend box office for any film in the company's history. Avengers: Infinity War earned an additional $25 million the Monday after its opening weekend, which was the highest-grossing Monday in April, beating Furious 7 (2015) ($14 million), and the second-best Monday gross for an MCU film, after Black Panther ($40.1 million). The next day, it earned $23.5 million, which was the highest-grossing Tuesday for an MCU film, beating Black Panther ($20.8 million), and the highest-grossing Tuesday in May, beating The Avengers ($17.6 million). It also tied The Force Awakens for the fastest to reach $300 million at five days.

The film remained number one in its second weekend, earning $115.5 million, which was the second-best second weekend ever after The Force Awakens ($149.2 million). Infinity War also surpassed $400 million in the weekend, doing so in nine days, becoming the second fastest film to reach that mark, again after The Force Awakens's eight days. In its third weekend, Infinity War remained number one at the box office, and became the second-fastest film to surpass $500 million, doing so in 15 days (behind The Force Awakens's 10 days). The weekend also saw its total domestic IMAX gross become $48.1 million, which was the highest for any MCU film. The film's fourth weekend saw it come in second, behind Deadpool 2, and in its fifth it finished third behind Solo: A Star Wars Story (2018) and Deadpool 2. By May 23, Infinity War surpassed $600 million, becoming the second-fastest film to do so in 26 days, after The Force Awakens (12 days). It remained in the top ten through its ninth weekend. In the United States and Canada, it went on to become the fourth-highest-grossing film of all time, and the second-highest-grossing superhero film, behind Black Panther.

==== Other territories ====
Outside the United States and Canada, the film earned $382.7 million from 52 markets, opening number one in all, and became the number two opening internationally, behind The Fate of the Furious ($444.2 million). IMAX contributed $18.5 million, which was the best opening outside of the US, Canada, and China, surpassing The Force Awakens ($17.5 million). All-time opening weekend records were set in South Korea ($39.2 million), Mexico ($25.4 million), Brazil ($19.1 million), India (for a Western release, $18.6 million), the Philippines ($12.5 million), Thailand ($10 million), Indonesia ($9.6 million), Malaysia, Hong Kong, Vietnam, Central America, Peru, Chile, Ecuador, Venezuela, Bolivia, South Africa, Turkey, the United Arab Emirates, and West Africa, with many also setting opening day records. France had the biggest superhero opening in the market with $17.7 million, as did Denmark, Finland, Norway, Portugal, and Sweden. The United Kingdom earned $8.9 million, which was the biggest MCU opening day and third-highest opening day for a Disney film; it would go on to earn $41.4 million for the weekend, which was the third-highest of all time and the second-highest Disney opening. Argentina had the second-highest opening day of all time, while Germany had the best superhero film opening day of all time, ultimately earning $14.7 million, which was the best superhero opening ever. Many other European countries and the Middle East also broke superhero film records. Japan had the second-biggest opening for an MCU film with $9 million, and Australia had the second-highest opening weekend ever, with $23.2 million.

Avengers: Infinity War remained number one in its 54 markets in its second weekend. The $4.9 million opening day in Russia was the biggest of all time. However, there was some controversy with the film's release in that country. Originally, the Russian government ordered it to be released on May 11, but after a scandal the government made concessions and agreed to let it premiere on May 3 with a condition that on May 9, during the Victory Day, only Russian films would be played in the cinema theatres. Infinity War was also the first film in Russia to sell more than 1 million tickets in a single day, and went on to gross $17.6 million in the market, a new opening weekend record. IMAX contributed $2.2 million in the market, which was also an opening weekend record. In its third weekend, the film remained number one in a majority of its markets. Infinity War opened in China to $200 million (RMB 1.266 billion), which was the second-highest opening weekend in local currency behind The Fate of the Furious ($184 million and RMB 1.352 million). IMAX contributed $20.5 million, which was the third-largest opening in China. Infinity War also broke China's pre-sale record of 400 million yuan ($63 million). In India, Infinity War became the first Hollywood film to earn over ₹2 billion net ($29.7 million), and also became the highest-grossing MCU film in the United Kingdom. In its sixth weekend, the film became the highest-grossing MCU film in Japan with $33 million.

The film became the highest-grossing release ever in Brazil, Indonesia, the Philippines, Central America, Bolivia, Venezuela, Latin America as a region, Mexico, Chile, Ecuador, Peru, Malaysia, Singapore, India (for a Western release), Vietnam, Indonesia, Thailand (for a Western release), and Mongolia, the second-highest in the Asia-Pacific region (for a Western release), Hong Kong, and South Korea (for a Western release), and the third-highest in China (for a Western release). It is also the highest-grossing superhero film in many European countries, including the United Kingdom. As of June 17, 2018, the film's top markets are China ($373.4 million), the United Kingdom ($95.7 million), and South Korea ($92.8 million). The film is the third-highest-grossing film of all time in territories outside the United States and Canada.

=== Critical response ===
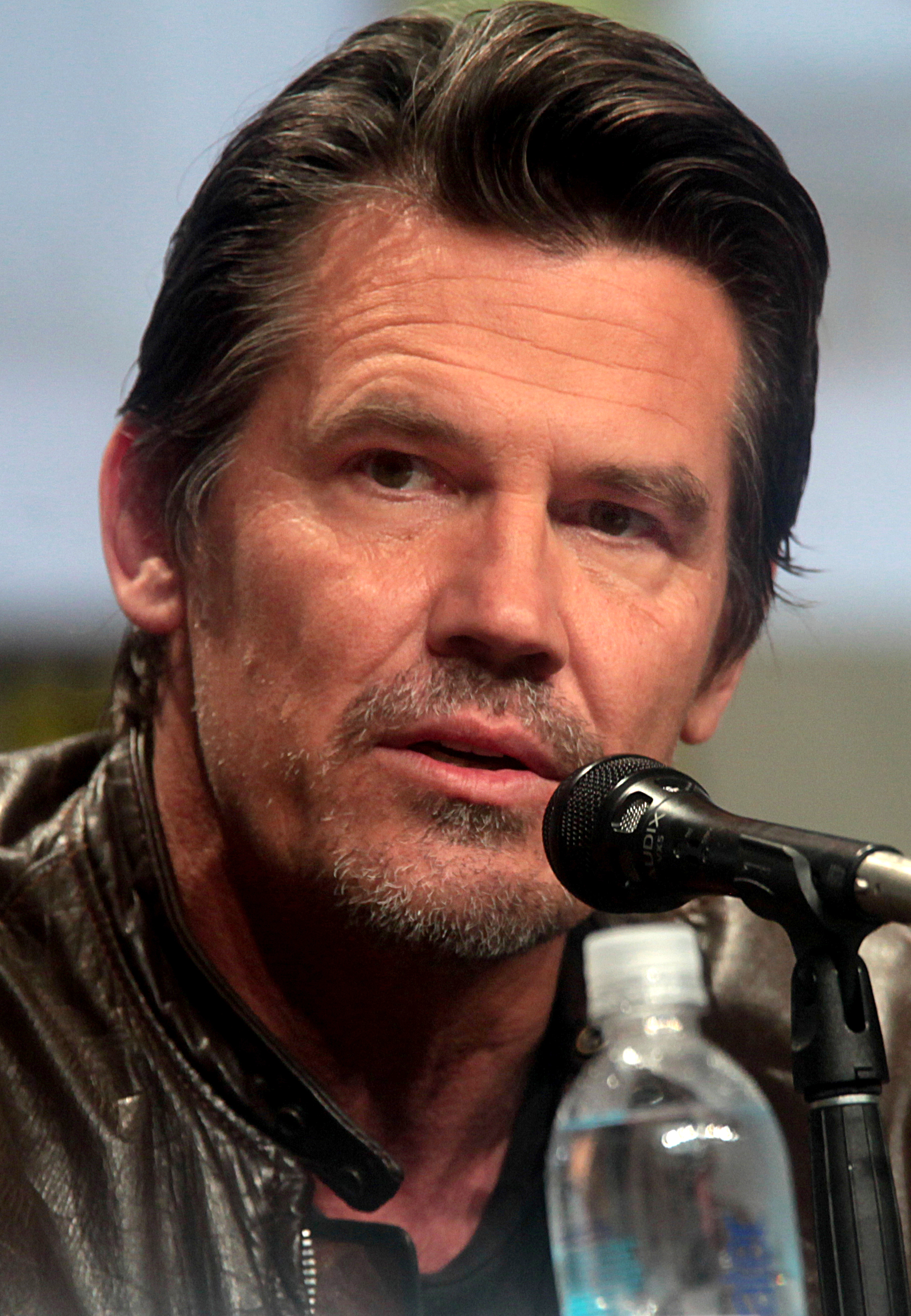
Josh Brolin's performance as Thanos was praised by many critics.

The review aggregator Rotten Tomatoes reported an approval rating of 85%, with an average score of 7.7/10, based on 486 reviews. The website's critical consensus reads, "Avengers: Infinity War ably juggles a dizzying array of MCU heroes in the fight against their gravest threat yet, and the result is a thrilling, emotionally resonant blockbuster that (mostly) realizes its gargantuan ambitions." Metacritic, which uses a weighted average, assigned the film a score of 68 out of 100 based on 54 critics, indicating "generally favorable" reviews.

Todd McCarthy of The Hollywood Reporter praised the writers' and directors' ability to balance the large cast of characters, saying they, "under the supervision of Marvel Films maestro Kevin Feige, acknowledge the traffic jam of egos and play it for laughs". Owen Gleiberman of Variety concurred, stating, "Infinity War is a brashly entertaining jamboree, structured to show off each hero or heroine and give them just enough to do, and to update their mythologies without making it all feel like homework". Rolling Stone's Peter Travers said the film is "too much of a good thing" and wrote, "The Russo brothers have clearly never learned the concept that less is more. They've used the premise of an Avengers reunion to put on a fireworks explosion of action and laughs that won't quit". Richard Roeper of the Chicago Sun-Times called it Marvel's "biggest and most ambitious movie yet", but concluded "it's certainly not the best. However, there's plenty of action, humor and heart—and some genuinely effective dramatic moments". Roeper went on to praise the film's cast and Josh Brolin in particular, whom he called "the film's most interesting performance". Gleiberman called Brolin's motion capture performance "supremely effective" and said, "Brolin infuses Thanos with his slit-eyed manipulative glower, so that the evil in this movie never feels less than personal". McCarthy wrote, "Brolin's calm, considered reading of the character bestows this conquering beast with an unexpectedly resonant emotional dimension, making him much more than a thick stick figure of a supervillain". Gleiberman also praised the film's action sequences, saying "Infinity War brims with tensely spectacular combat sequences, even if the question of who's going to win each one has that extravagantly arbitrary could-Mighty-Mouse-beat-up-Superman? quality". McCarthy called the scale of the action "astonishing", and Travers wrote, "Avengers: Infinity War leaves viewers up in the air, feeling exhilarated and cheated at the same time, aching for a closure that never comes". Josh Spiegel, also of The Hollywood Reporter, said the film takes "a cue from the ending of The Empire Strikes Back in its super-sized finale; this is the equivalent of Han Solo frozen in the carbonite, on steroids".

A. O. Scott of The New York Times criticized the film's reliance on other films in the Marvel Cinematic Universe, saying, "Considered on its own, as a single, nearly 2-hour-40-minute movie, Avengers: Infinity War makes very little sense", but conceded that it "was never meant to be viewed or judged in isolation". Richard Brody of The New Yorker agreed, stating, "The insubstantiality of the film isn't due to the infinite yet flimsy malleability of C.G.I. gimmickry but, instead, to the dispersion of its drama throughout the many cinematic installations set in the Marvel Cinematic Universe". Stephanie Zacharek of Time said, "[It] isn't really a beginning, but more of a middle or an end with a new piece of yarn attached. You need to have seen and internalized every one of the previous 18 Marvel Cinematic Universe movies to fully get it". Justin Chang of the Los Angeles Times called it a "brisk, propulsive, occasionally rousing and borderline-gutsy continuation of a saga that finally and sensibly seems to be drawing to a close", but called its ultimate bid for catharsis "unsuccessful" since the Marvel "assembly line [is not stopped] from chugging ahead with its signature polished, mechanized efficiency". Scott also criticized the action sequences, calling them "tedious and predictable" and "surely the most expensive parts of the movie, but the money seems less like an imaginative tool than a substitute for genuine imagination". Likewise, Zacharek said, "There's no pacing in Avengers: Infinity War. It's all sensation and no pulse. Everything is big, all of the time".

=== Audience response ===
Audiences polled by CinemaScore gave the film an average grade of "A" on an A+ to F scale, and those at PostTrak gave the film an 87% overall positive score and a 68% "definite recommend". American YouTube personality Tony "Nem" Mitchell watched the film 103 times in theaters, a world record. When Mitchell's streak was gaining media awareness around his 44th viewing, he noted that IMAX reached out to give him 50 free tickets to continue the streak, and the Russo brothers invited him to Endgame's premiere. Mitchell said this was the way he "want[ed] to support Marvel and the Russo brothers". Seventeen-year-old Kieran Harvey from Staffordshire also watched the film in theaters 100 times. Harvey stated that he "didn't plan on seeing it this many times it just sort of happened" adding that Infinity War "just felt so different to anything I've ever seen before, and I just love it so much so have been going as much as I can!"

The ending of the film sparked various Internet meme reactions, including one referencing Spider-Man saying he does not feel good as he disintegrates, which was applied to other things. The website, DidThanosKill.Me was created for fans to see if they would have been spared by Thanos or not. The ending also spawned the creation of the Reddit subreddit, /r/thanosdidnothingwrong. A user within the subreddit suggested that half of the approximately 20,000 subscribers at the time be banned from the subreddit, in order to mimic the events of the film. After the community agreed to the measure, the moderators approached Reddit's administrators to see if the mass ban would even be possible. Once the administrators agreed to the random ban of half the subscribers, it was set to occur on July 9, 2018. Notice of the impending ban made the subreddit's subscribers increase to over 700,000, including both of the Russos who subscribed. Ahead of the ban, Brolin posted a video saying "Here we go, Reddit users," and ending it with a snap. Over 60,000 people watched a live Twitch stream of the ban occurring, which lasted several hours. The ban of over 300,000 accounts, which included Anthony Russo, was the largest in Reddit's history. Those banned then gathered in the new subreddit, /r/inthesoulstone. One Reddit user who participated described the ban as embodying "the spirit of the Internet" with people "banding together, en masse, around something relatively meaningless but somehow decidedly awesome and hilarious". Andrew Tigani of Screen Rant said this showed "how impactful the film has already become to pop culture. It is also a testament to how valuable fan interaction can be via social media".

=== Accolades ===
At the 91st Academy Awards, Avengers: Infinity War received a nomination for Best Visual Effects. The film's other nominations include an Annie Award, a British Academy Film Award, and two Critics' Choice Awards, among others. In 2020, Infinity War was ranked seventh in an Empire magazine poll for the 100 greatest films of the 21st century.

== Sequel ==
Avengers: Endgame was released on April 26, 2019, with the Russos returning to direct, and Markus and McFeely once again writing the screenplay.

== See also ==
- "What If... Zombies?!", an episode of the MCU television series What If...? that reimagines the events of this film
