= List of highest-grossing superhero films =

The following page lists the highest-grossing superhero films of all time, the highest-grossing superheroes at the box office, and the biggest opening weekends for superhero films. The figures have not been adjusted for inflation.

== Highest-grossing superhero films ==
The top eight highest-grossing superhero films and nine out of the top ten highest-grossing superhero films have been produced by Marvel Studios, within the Marvel Cinematic Universe (MCU). Avengers: Infinity War, Avengers: Endgame and Spider-Man: Brand New Day are the only three superhero films to surpass a $2 billion worldwide gross, with Avengers: Endgame being the highest-grossing film of all time. The top 16 are among the 50 highest-grossing films of all time. Most of the films on this list are from either Marvel or DC Comics. 2018 is the most prominent year, with seven films being released that year.

Rank	Film	Worldwide gross	Year	Superhero(es)	Source	Ref
1	Avengers: Endgame †	$2,942,318,540	2019	Avengers	Marvel	
2	Spider-Man: Brand New Day †	$2,521,157,572	2026	Spider-Man	Marvel	
3	Avengers: Infinity War	$2,048,359,754	2018	Avengers	Marvel	
4	Spider-Man: No Way Home	$1,922,598,800	2021	Spider-Man	Marvel	
5	The Avengers	$1,518,812,988	2012	Avengers	Marvel	
6	Avengers: Age of Ultron	$1,402,809,540	2015	Avengers	Marvel	
7	Black Panther	$1,346,913,171	2018	Black Panther	Marvel	
8	Deadpool & Wolverine	$1,338,073,645	2024	Deadpool and Wolverine	Marvel	
9	Incredibles 2	$1,242,805,359	2018	The Incredibles	Pixar	
10	Iron Man 3	$1,215,577,205	2013	Iron Man	Marvel	
11	Captain America: Civil War	$1,153,304,495	2016	Captain America	Marvel	
12	Aquaman	$1,148,161,807	2018	Aquaman	DC	
13	Spider-Man: Far From Home	$1,131,927,996	2019	Spider-Man	Marvel	
14	Captain Marvel	$1,131,416,446	2019	Captain Marvel	Marvel	
15	The Dark Knight Rises	$1,081,041,287	2012	Batman	DC	
16	Joker	$1,078,751,311	2019	Joker	DC	
17	The Dark Knight	$1,006,222,205	2008	Batman	DC	
18	Doctor Strange in the Multiverse of Madness	$955,775,804	2022	Doctor Strange	Marvel	
19	Spider-Man 3	$893,122,603	2007	Spider-Man	Marvel	
20	Spider-Man: Homecoming	$880,166,924	2017	Spider-Man	Marvel	
21	Batman v Superman: Dawn of Justice	$873,634,919	2016	Batman and Superman	DC	
22	Guardians of the Galaxy Vol. 2	$863,756,051	2017	Guardians of the Galaxy	Marvel	
23	Black Panther: Wakanda Forever	$859,208,836	2022	Black Panther	Marvel	
24	Venom	$856,085,151	2018	Venom	Marvel	
25	Thor: Ragnarok	$853,983,879	2017	Thor	Marvel	
26	Guardians of the Galaxy Vol. 3	$845,555,777	2023	Guardians of the Galaxy	Marvel	
27	Wonder Woman	$823,970,682	2017	Wonder Woman	DC	
28	Spider-Man	$821,708,551	2002	Spider-Man	Marvel	
29	Spider-Man 2	$788,976,453	2004	Spider-Man	Marvel	
30	Deadpool 2	$785,046,920	2018	Deadpool	Marvel	
31	Deadpool	$783,112,979	2016	Deadpool	Marvel	
32	Guardians of the Galaxy	$773,328,629	2014	Guardians of the Galaxy	Marvel	
33	The Batman	$770,836,163	2022	Batman	DC	
34	Thor: Love and Thunder	$760,928,081	2022	Thor	Marvel	
35	The Amazing Spider-Man	$757,930,663	2012	Spider-Man	Marvel	
36	Suicide Squad	$746,846,894	2016	Suicide Squad	DC	
37	X-Men: Days of Future Past	$746,045,700	2014	X-Men	Marvel	
38	The Matrix Reloaded	$741,847,937	2003	Neo	The Wachowskis	
39	Captain America: The Winter Soldier	$714,421,503	2014	Captain America	Marvel	
40	The Amazing Spider-Man 2	$708,982,323	2014	Spider-Man	Marvel	
41	Spider-Man: Across the Spider-Verse	$690,516,673	2023	Spider-Man	Marvel	
42	Doctor Strange	$677,718,395	2016	Doctor Strange	Marvel	
43	Man of Steel	$668,045,518	2013	Superman	DC	
44	Justice League	$657,924,295	2017	Justice League	DC	
45	Big Hero 6	$657,818,612	2014	Big Hero 6	Marvel	
46	Thor: The Dark World	$644,571,402	2013	Thor	Marvel	
47	The Incredibles	$631,607,053	2004	The Incredibles	Pixar	
48	Hancock	$624,386,746	2008	Hancock	Vincent Ngo	
49	Iron Man 2	$623,933,331	2010	Iron Man	Marvel	
50	Ant-Man and the Wasp	$622,674,139	2018	Ant-Man and Wasp	Marvel	

== Highest-grossing film franchises ==
This is a list of the highest-grossing superhero film series at the box office. The Marvel Cinematic Universe ranks as the highest-grossing film series of all time grossing nearly $35.1 billion. Avengers has the best average with an average of nearly $2 billion per film. A series must have at least two released films to qualify for this list.

† Background shading indicates that at least one film in the series is playing in the week commencing 13 November 2026 in theaters around the world.

Highest-grossing franchises and film series^{[§]}(The films in each franchise can be viewed by selecting "show".)

Rank	Series	Total worldwide gross	No. of films	Average of films	Highest-grossing film

1
Marvel Cinematic Universe^{S} †
$35,096,164,268
38
$923,583,270
Avengers: Endgame ($2,942,318,540)

The Infinity Saga †	$22,677,200,680	23	$985,965,247	Avengers: Endgame ($2,942,318,540)
/ Phase Three † / $13,651,380,092 / 11 / $1,241,034,554 / Avengers: Endgame ($2,942,318,540); 1 / Avengers: Endgame (2019) † / $2,942,318,540; 2 / Avengers: Infinity War (2018) / $2,048,359,754; 3 / Black Panther (2018) / $1,347,280,838; 4 / Captain America: Civil War (2016) / $1,153,337,496; 5 / Spider-Man: Far From Home (2019) / $1,132,679,685; 6 / Captain Marvel (2019) / $1,128,274,794; 7 / Spider-Man: Homecoming (2017) / $880,918,840; 8 / Guardians of the Galaxy Vol. 2 (2017) / $863,756,051; 9 / Thor: Ragnarok (2017) / $853,983,879; 10 / Doctor Strange (2016) / $677,796,076; 11 / Ant-Man and the Wasp (2018) / $622,674,139
/ Phase Two / $5,269,487,547 / 6 / $878,247,925 / Avengers: Age of Ultron ($1,402,809,540); 1 / Avengers: Age of Ultron (2015) / $1,402,809,540; 2 / Iron Man 3 (2013) / $1,214,811,252; 3 / Guardians of the Galaxy (2014) / $773,350,147; 4 / Captain America: The Winter Soldier (2014) / $714,421,503; 5 / Thor: The Dark World (2013) / $644,783,140; 6 / Ant-Man (2015) / $519,311,965
/ Phase One / $3,813,212,481 / 6 / $635,535,414 / The Avengers ($1,518,815,515); 1 / The Avengers (2012) / $1,518,815,515; 2 / Iron Man 2 (2010) / $623,933,331; 3 / Iron Man (2008) / $585,796,247; 4 / Thor (2011) / $449,326,618; 5 / Captain America: The First Avenger (2011) / $370,569,774; 6 / The Incredible Hulk (2008) / $264,770,996

The Multiverse Saga †	$12,418,963,588	15	$827,930,906	Spider-Man: Brand New Day ($2,521,157,572)
/ Phase Four / $5,712,571,367 / 7 / $816,081,624 / Spider-Man: No Way Home ($1,922,598,800); 1 / Spider-Man: No Way Home (2021) / $1,922,598,800; 2 / Doctor Strange in the Multiverse of Madness (2022) / $955,775,804; 3 / Black Panther: Wakanda Forever (2022) / $859,208,836; 4 / Thor: Love and Thunder (2022) / $760,928,081; 5 / Shang-Chi and the Legend of the Ten Rings (2021) / $432,243,292; 6 / Eternals (2021) / $402,064,899; 7 / Black Widow (2021) / $379,751,655
/ Phase Five / $3,663,375,921 / 6 / $610,562,654 / Deadpool & Wolverine ($1,338,073,645); 1 / Deadpool & Wolverine (2024) / $1,338,073,645; 2 / Guardians of the Galaxy Vol. 3 (2023) / $845,555,777; 3 / Ant-Man and the Wasp: Quantumania (2023) / $476,071,180; 4 / Captain America: Brave New World (2025) / $415,101,577; 5 / Thunderbolts* (2025) / $382,436,917; 6 / The Marvels (2023) / $206,136,825
/ Phase Six † / $3,043,016,300 / 2 / $1,521,508,150 / Spider-Man: Brand New Day ($2,521,157,572); 1 / Spider-Man: Brand New Day (2026) † / $2,521,157,572; 2 / The Fantastic Four: First Steps (2025) / $521,858,728

2	Spider-Man †	$13,675,249,650	17	$804,426,450	Brand New Day ($2,521,157,572)
/ Marvel Cinematic Universe † / $6,457,354,897 / 4 / $1,614,338,724 / Brand New Day ($2,521,157,572); 1 / Brand New Day (2026) † / $2,521,157,572; 2 / No Way Home (2021) / $1,922,598,800; 3 / Far From Home (2019) / $1,132,679,685; 4 / Homecoming (2017) / $880,918,840
/ Raimi series / $2,511,239,929 / 3 / $837,079,976 / Spider-Man 3 ($895,735,062); 1 / Spider-Man 3 (2007) / $895,735,062; 2 / Spider-Man (2002) / $825,776,725; 3 / Spider-Man 2 (2004) / $789,728,142
/ Sony's Spider-Man Universe / $2,171,872,891 / 6 / $361,978,815 / Venom ($856,085,151); 1 / Venom (2018) / $856,085,151; 2 / Venom: Let There Be Carnage (2021) / $506,813,864; 3 / Venom: The Last Dance (2024) / $478,937,618; 4 / Morbius (2022) / $167,460,961; 5 / Madame Web (2024) / $100,498,764; 6 / Kraven the Hunter (2024) / $62,076,533
/ Webb series / $1,468,416,364 / 2 / $734,208,182 / The Amazing Spider-Man ($758,682,352); 1 / The Amazing Spider-Man (2012) / $758,682,352; 2 / The Amazing Spider-Man 2 (2014) / $709,734,012
/ Spider-Verse / $1,066,365,569 / 2 / $533,182,785 / Across the Spider-Verse ($690,824,738); 1 / Across the Spider-Verse (2023) / $690,824,738; 2 / Into the Spider-Verse (2018) / $375,540,831

3	Avengers †	$7,920,290,163	4	$1,980,072,541	Endgame ($2,942,318,540)
1	Endgame (2019) †	$2,942,318,540			
2	Infinity War (2018)	$2,052,415,039			
3	The Avengers (2012)	$1,520,538,536			
4	Age of Ultron (2015)	$1,405,018,048			

4	X-Men	$7,422,190,386	14	$530,156,456	Deadpool & Wolverine ($1,338,073,645)
/ Main series / $3,059,525,837 / 7 / $437,075,120 / Days of Future Past ($746,045,700); 1 / Days of Future Past (2014) / $746,045,700; 2 / Apocalypse (2016) / $543,934,105; 3 / The Last Stand (2006) / $460,435,291; 4 / X2 (2003) / $407,711,549; 5 / First Class (2011) / $352,616,690; 6 / X-Men (2000) / $296,339,528; 7 / Dark Phoenix (2019) / $252,442,974
/ Deadpool series / $2,906,582,409 / 3 / $968,860,803 / Deadpool & Wolverine ($1,338,073,645); 1 / Deadpool & Wolverine (2024) / $1,338,073,645; 2 / Deadpool 2 (2018) / $785,896,609; 3 / Deadpool (2016) / $782,612,155
/ Wolverine series / $1,406,912,546 / 3 / $468,970,849 / Logan ($619,021,436); 1 / Logan (2017) / $619,021,436; 2 / The Wolverine (2013) / $414,828,246; 3 / Origins: Wolverine (2009) / $373,062,864
The New Mutants (2020) / $49,169,594

5	DC Extended Universe^{S}	$7,187,966,578	15	$479,197,772	Aquaman ($1,148,485,886)
/ Aquaman series / $1,582,867,112 / 2 / $791,433,556 / Aquaman ($1,148,485,886); 1 / Aquaman (2018) / $1,148,485,886; 2 / The Lost Kingdom (2023) / $434,381,226
/ Wonder Woman series / $993,572,688 / 2 / $496,786,344 / Wonder Woman ($823,970,682); 1 / Wonder Woman (2017) / $823,970,682; 2 / 1984 (2020) / $169,602,006
/ Suicide Squad series / $915,504,459 / 2 / $457,752,230 / Suicide Squad ($746,846,894); 1 / Suicide Squad (2016) / $746,846,894; 2 / The Suicide Squad (2021) / $168,657,565
Shazam series $891,561,773 3 $297,187,258 Shazam! ($364,471,656): / Main series / $498,309,662 / 2 / $249,154,831 / Shazam! ($364,471,656); 1 / Shazam! (2019) / $364,471,656; 2 / Fury of the Gods (2023) / $133,838,006; Black Adam (2022) / $393,252,111
Batman v Superman: Dawn of Justice (2016) / $874,362,803
Man of Steel (2013) / $668,045,518
Justice League (2017) / $657,924,295
The Flash (2023) / $270,633,313
Birds of Prey (2020) / $205,322,941
Blue Beetle (2023) / $129,288,072

6	Batman †	$7,162,097,978	20	$358,104,899	The Dark Knight Rises ($1,081,169,825)
/ The Dark Knight trilogy / $2,463,137,450 / 3 / $821,045,817 / The Dark Knight Rises ($1,081,169,825); 1 / The Dark Knight Rises (2012) / $1,081,169,825; 2 / The Dark Knight (2008) / $1,008,294,632; 3 / Batman Begins (2005) / $373,672,993
/ Joker series / $1,281,958,569 / 2 / $640,979,285 / Joker ($1,074,458,282); 1 / Joker (2019) / $1,074,458,282; 2 / Folie à Deux (2024) / $207,500,287
/ Burton/Schumacher series / $1,253,192,682 / 4 / $313,298,171 / Batman ($411,556,825); 1 / Batman (1989) / $411,556,825; 2 / Batman Forever (1995) / $336,567,531; 3 / Batman Returns (1992) / $266,832,411; 4 / Batman & Robin (1997) / $238,235,915
Batman v Superman: Dawn of Justice (2016) / $873,637,528
The Batman (2022) / $772,319,315
The Lego Batman Movie (2017) / $311,950,384
Clayface (2026) † / $109,060,568
Catwoman (2004) / $82,102,379
Mask of the Phantasm (1993) / $5,617,391
/ DC Universe Animated Original Movies / $4,501,125 / 2 / $2,250,563 / The Killing Joke ($4,462,034); 1 / The Killing Joke (2016) / $4,462,034; 2 / Batman and Harley Quinn (2017) / $39,091
/ 1960s TV series / $3,957,343 / 2 / $1,978,672 / Batman: The Movie ($3,900,000); 1 / Batman: The Movie (1966)^{*}^{R} / $3,900,000; 2 / Return of the Caped Crusaders (2016) / $57,343
Aztec Batman: Clash of Empires (2025) / $663,244

7	Godzilla	$3,373,210,543	39	$86,492,578	Godzilla x Kong: The New Empire ($571,850,016)
/ MonsterVerse / $1,957,742,317 / 4 / $489,435,579 / Godzilla x Kong: The New Empire ($5,712,850,016); 1 / Godzilla x Kong: The New Empire (2024) / $571,850,016; 2 / Godzilla (2014) / $529,076,069; 3 / Godzilla vs. Kong (2021) / $470,116,094; 4 / King of the Monsters (2019) / $387,300,138
Toho films / $993,575,278 / 34 / $29,222,802 / Godzilla Minus One ($114,809,252); / Shōwa era / $514,685,669 / 15 / $34,312,378 / Godzilla vs. Mechagodzilla ($34,122,958); 1 / Godzilla vs. Mechagodzilla (1974) / $34,122,958; 2 / Godzilla / Godzilla, King of the Monsters! (1954) / $20,562,711; 3 / Raids Again (1955) / $20,000,000; 4 / King Kong vs. Godzilla (1962) / $20,000,000; 5 / Mothra vs. Godzilla (1964) / $20,000,000; 6 / Ghidorah, the Three-Headed Monster (1964) / $20,000,000; 7 / Invasion of Astro-Monster (1965) / $20,000,000; 8 / Ebirah, Horror of the Deep (1966) / $20,000,000; 9 / Son of Godzilla (1967) / $20,000,000; 10 / Destroy All Monsters (1968) / $20,000,000; 11 / All Monsters Attack (1969) / $20,000,000; 12 / Godzilla vs. Hedorah (1971) / $20,000,000; 13 / Godzilla vs. Gigan (1972) / $20,000,000; 14 / Godzilla vs. Megalon (1973) / $20,000,000; 15 / Terror of Mechagodzilla (1975) / $20,000,000 / Reiwa era / $304,494,510 / 6 / $50,749,085 / Minus One ($114,809,252); 1 / Minus One (2023) / $114,809,252; 2 / Minus Zero (2026) / $105,878,654; 3 / Shin Godzilla (2016) / $78,053,145; 4 / Planet of the Monsters (2017) / $3,285,291; 5 / The Planet Eater (2018) / $1,523,168; 6 / City on the Edge of Battle (2018) / $945,000 / Heisei era / $133,916,395 / 7 / $19,130,914 / Godzilla vs. Mechagodzilla II ($36,000,000); 1 / Godzilla vs. Mechagodzilla II (1993) / $36,000,000; 2 / Godzilla vs. Destoroyah (1995) / $24,800,000; 3 / Godzilla vs. Mothra (1992)^{R} / $20,000,000; 4 / Godzilla vs. SpaceGodzilla (1994)^{R} / $20,000,000; 5 / The Return of Godzilla / Godzilla 1985 (1984) / $15,116,395; 6 / Godzilla vs. King Ghidorah (1991)^{R} / $11,000,000; 7 / Godzilla vs. Biollante (1989)^{R} / $7,000,000 / Millennium era / $87,675,377 / 6 / $14,612,563 / Godzilla 2000 ($25,037,390); 1 / Godzilla 2000 (1999) / $25,037,390; 2 / Godzilla, Mothra and King Ghidorah: Giant Monsters All-Out Attack (2001) / $18,623,382; 3 / Against Mechagodzilla (2002) / $14,122,958; 4 / Tokyo S.O.S. (2003) / $10,724,345; 5 / Godzilla vs. Megaguirus (2000) / $10,000,000; 6 / Final Wars (2004) / $9,167,302
Godzilla (1998) / $379,014,294

8	Superman	$3,300,027,883	11	$300,002,535	Batman v Superman: Dawn of Justice ($873,634,919)
/ DC Extended Universe / $1,541,680,437 / 2 / $770,840,219 / Batman v Superman: Dawn of Justice ($873,634,919); 1 / Batman v Superman: Dawn of Justice (2016) / $873,634,919; 2 / Man of Steel (2013) / $668,045,518
/ DC Universe / $745,190,335 / 2 / $372,595,168 / Superman (2025) ($618,723,803); 1 / Superman (2025) / $618,723,803; 2 / Supergirl (2026) / $126,466,532
Original series $622,048,041 5 $124,409,608 Superman ($300,451,603): / Christopher Reeve films / $607,751,603 / 4 / $151,937,901 / Superman ($300,451,603); 1 / Superman (1978) / $300,451,603; 2 / Superman II (1980) / $190,400,000; 3 / Superman III (1983) / $80,200,000; 4 / The Quest for Peace (1987) / $36,700,000; Supergirl (1984)^{*} / $14,296,438
Returns (2006) / $391,081,192
Death of Superman/Reign of the Supermen (2018) / $27,878

9	Thor	$2,710,127,907	4	$677,531,977	Ragnarok ($855,301,806)
1	Ragnarok (2017)	$855,301,806			
2	Love and Thunder (2022)	$760,928,081			
3	The Dark World (2013)	$644,571,402			
4	Thor (2011)	$449,326,618			

10	Captain America	$2,654,982,034	4	$663,745,509	Civil War ($1,155,046,416)
1	Civil War (2016)	$1,155,046,416			
2	The Winter Soldier (2014)	$714,264,267			
3	Brave New World (2025)	$415,101,577			
4	The First Avenger (2011)	$370,569,774			

11	MonsterVerse^{S}	$2,524,295,129	5	$504,859,026	Godzilla x Kong: The New Empire ($571,850,016)
/ Godzilla vs Kong series / $1,041,966,110 / 2 / $520,983,055 / Godzilla x Kong: The New Empire ($571,850,016); 1 / Godzilla x Kong: The New Empire (2024) / $571,850,016; 2 / Godzilla vs. Kong (2021) / $470,116,094
/ Godzilla series / $915,676,207 / 2 / $457,838,104 / Godzilla ($529,076,069); 1 / Godzilla (2014) / $529,076,069; 2 / King of the Monsters (2019) / $386,600,138
Kong: Skull Island (2017) / $566,652,812

12	Guardians of the Galaxy	$2,482,661,975	3	$827,553,992	Guardians of the Galaxy Vol. 2 ($863,756,051)
1	Guardians of the Galaxy Vol. 2 (2017)	$863,756,051			
2	Guardians of the Galaxy Vol. 3 (2023)	$845,555,777			
3	Guardians of the Galaxy (2014)	$773,350,147			

13	Iron Man	$2,425,306,783	3	$808,435,594	Iron Man 3 ($1,214,811,252)
1	Iron Man 3 (2013)	$1,215,577,205			
2	Iron Man 2 (2010)	$623,933,331			
3	Iron Man (2008)	$585,796,247			

14	King Kong	$2,332,811,615	10	$233,281,162	Godzilla x Kong: The New Empire ($571,850,016)
/ MonsterVerse / $1,610,618,922 / 3 / $536,872,974 / Godzilla x Kong: The New Empire ($571,850,016); 1 / Godzilla x Kong: The New Empire (2024) / $571,850,016; 2 / Kong: Skull Island (2017) / $568,652,812; 3 / Godzilla vs. Kong (2021) / $470,116,094
King Kong (2005) / $556,906,378
/ Remake series / $139,525,665 / 2 / $69,762,833 / King Kong ($90,614,445); 1 / King Kong (1976) / $90,614,445; 2 / King Kong Lives (1986) / $48,911,220
/ Toho films / $13,367,650 / 2 / $6,683,825 / King Kong vs. Godzilla ($10,367,650); 1 / King Kong vs. Godzilla (1962) / $10,367,650; 2 / King Kong Escapes (1967) / $3,000,000
/ Original series / $12,393,000 / 2 / $6,196,500 / King Kong ($11,777,000); 1 / King Kong (1933) / $11,777,000; 2 / Son of Kong (1933) / $616,000

15	Black Panther	$2,209,134,919	2	$1,104,567,460	Black Panther ($1,349,926,083)
1	Black Panther (2018)	$1,349,926,083			
2	Wakanda Forever (2022)	$859,208,836			

16	The Incredibles	$1,875,825,093	2	$937,912,547	Incredibles 2 ($1,242,805,359)
1	Incredibles 2 (2018)	$1,242,805,359			
2	The Incredibles (2004)	$633,019,734			

17	The Matrix	$1,795,011,841	4	$448,752,960	Reloaded ($741,847,937)
1	Reloaded (2003)	$741,847,937			
2	The Matrix (1999)	$466,621,824			
3	Revolutions (2003)	$427,344,325			
4	Resurrections (2021)	$159,197,755			

18	Doctor Strange	$1,633,494,199	2	$816,747,100	The Multiverse of Madness ($955,775,804)
1	The Multiverse of Madness (2022)	$955,775,804			
2	Doctor Strange (2016)	$677,718,395			

19	Ant-Man	$1,618,057,284	3	$539,352,428	Ant-Man and the Wasp ($622,674,139)
1	Ant-Man and the Wasp (2018)	$622,674,139			
2	Ant-Man (2015)	$519,311,965			
3	Ant-Man and the Wasp: Quantumania (2023)	$476,071,180			

20	Aquaman	$1,582,177,557	2	$791,088,779	Aquaman ($1,148,485,886)
1	Aquaman (2018)	$1,148,485,886			
2	The Lost Kingdom (2023)	$433,691,671			

^{S}Marvel Cinematic Universe, DC Extended Universe, and MonsterVerse are shared universes for which some properties also have their own entries.
^{*}US and Canada gross only.
^{R}Distributor rentals.
^{†}Partial worldwide gross figure.

== Biggest opening weekends ==
This list charts films the 50 biggest worldwide openings. Since films do not open on Fridays in many markets, the 'opening' is taken to be the gross between the first day of release and the first Sunday following the movie's release. Figures prior to the year 2002 are not available.

Since many American films do not open in all markets at the same time, the 'opening' gross varies depending on when it was released in the US-Canada market. For example, for films like Captain Marvel and Batman v Superman: Dawn of Justice which opened in the US-Canada market and in most other major markets during the same weekend, the 'opening' is the total gross of the film during that weekend. On the other hand, for films like Avengers: Age of Ultron and Captain America: Civil War which opened in several markets a week ahead of their respective releases in the US-Canada market, the 'opening' is the sum of the opening grosses in the markets where they were released first and the opening in the US-Canada market. In the latter case, the opening grosses from territories after the initial overseas opening are not included in the 'opening' of the film. In all cases, if a film opens in a market after its release in the US-Canada market, that opening is not included in the 'opening' of the film.

Rank	Film	Gross ($ millions)	Year	Superhero(es)	Source	Ref (Note: The Worldwide opening weekend is the sum of the domestic (US + Canada) and foreign opening weekends on the "Summary" and "Foreign" tabs in Box Office Mojo. If the domestic opening was before Friday then the preceding days on the "Daily" tab are added. The sums are listed on the record page for Worldwide Openings.)
1	Avengers: Endgame	$1,223.6	2019	Avengers	Marvel	
2	Spider-Man: Brand New Day	$941.7	2026	Spider-Man	Marvel	
3	Avengers: Infinity War	$640.5	2018	Avengers	Marvel	
4	Spider-Man: No Way Home	$600.9	2021	Spider-Man	Marvel	
5	Captain Marvel	$456.7	2019	Captain Marvel	Marvel	
6	Doctor Strange in the Multiverse of Madness	$450	2022	Doctor Strange	Marvel	
7	Deadpool & Wolverine	$444.7	2024	Deadpool/Wolverine	Marvel	
8	Batman v Superman: Dawn of Justice	$422.5	2016	Batman/Superman	DC	
9	The Avengers	$392.5	2012	Avengers	Marvel	
10	Avengers: Age of Ultron	$392.4	2015	Avengers	Marvel	
11	Spider-Man 3	$381.7	2007	Spider-Man	Marvel	
12	Captain America: Civil War	$379.5	2016	Captain America	Marvel	
13	Iron Man 3	$372.5	2013	Iron Man	Marvel	
14	Black Panther	$371.4	2018	Black Panther	Marvel	
15	Thor: Love and Thunder	$303.3	2022	Thor	Marvel	
16	Deadpool 2	$300.4	2018	Deadpool	Marvel	
17	Spider-Man: Far From Home	$295.8	2019	Spider-Man	Marvel	
18	Justice League	$278.8	2017	Justice League	DC	
19	Suicide Squad	$267.0	2016	Suicide Squad	DC	
20	Deadpool	$264.7	2016	Deadpool	Marvel	
21	X-Men: Days of Future Past	$262.9	2014	X-Men	Marvel	
22	Spider-Man: Homecoming	$256.5	2017	Spider-Man	Marvel	
23	Guardians of the Galaxy Vol. 2	$252.5	2017	Guardians of the Galaxy	Marvel	
24	The Dark Knight Rises	$248.9	2012	Batman	DC	
25	Joker	$248.4	2019	Joker	DC	
26	Logan	$247.4	2017	Wolverine	Marvel	
27	Incredibles 2	$235.8	2018	The Incredibles	Pixar	
28	Thor: Ragnarok	$231.8	2017	Thor	Marvel	
29	Wonder Woman	$228.3	2017	Wonder Woman	DC	
30	Ant-Man and the Wasp: Quantumania	$225.3	2023	Ant-Man/Wasp	Marvel	
31	Iron Man 2	$220.8	2010	Iron Man	Marvel	
32	Superman	$220	2025	Superman	DC	
33	The Fantastic Four: First Steps	$216.7	2025	Fantastic Four	Marvel	
34	Spider-Man: Across the Spider-Verse	$208.6	2023	Miles Morales	Marvel	
35	Venom	$207.4	2018	Venom	Marvel	
36	Man of Steel	$202.0	2013	Superman	DC	
37	Iron Man	$201.2	2008	Iron Man	Marvel	
38	Godzilla	$200	2014	Godzilla	Toho	
39	The Dark Knight	$199.7	2008	Batman	DC	
40	Thor: The Dark World	$195.1	2013	Thor	Marvel	
41	Captain America: Brave New World	$192.4	2025	Falcon	Marvel	
42	Spider-Man 2	$189.4	2004	Spider-Man	Marvel	
43	The Amazing Spider-Man	$188.2	2012	Spider-Man	Marvel	
44	Hancock	$182.5	2008	Hancock	Vincent Ngo	
45	X-Men: The Last Stand	$179.0	2006	X-Men	Marvel	
46	Doctor Strange	$172.8	2016	Doctor Strange	Marvel	
47	Captain America: The Winter Soldier	$170.2	2014	Captain America	Marvel	
48	Aquaman	$166.8	2018	Aquaman	DC	
49	X-Men: Apocalypse	$166.6	2016	X-Men	Marvel	
50	Thunderbolts*	$162.1	2025	Thunderbolts	Marvel	

== Timeline of gross records ==
=== Highest-grossing films ===
At least 18 films since 1964 have held the record for highest-grossing superhero film. Spider-Man has held the record twice, Batman and the Avengers have held it three times each, and Godzilla held it 9 times. Films based on DC Comics have held the record four times, films based on Marvel Comics have held it five times, and Toho films held it 9 times.

Title	Year	Record-setting gross	Superhero(es)	Source	Ref
Godzilla	1957	$20,000,000	Godzilla	Toho	(Note: By 1977, the first thirteen Godzilla films had grossed more than $260 million worldwide, grossing more than $20 million per film.)
Godzilla Raids Again	1959	$20,000,000	Godzilla	Toho	(Note: By 1977, the first thirteen Godzilla films had grossed more than $260 million worldwide, grossing more than $20 million per film.)
King Kong vs. Godzilla	1963	$20,000,000	Godzilla	Toho	(Note: By 1977, the first thirteen Godzilla films had grossed more than $260 million worldwide, grossing more than $20 million per film.)
Mothra vs. Godzilla	1964	$20,000,000	Godzilla	Toho	(Note: By 1977, the first thirteen Godzilla films had grossed more than $260 million worldwide, grossing more than $20 million per film.)
Ghidorah	1965	$20,000,000	Godzilla	Toho	(Note: By 1977, the first thirteen Godzilla films had grossed more than $260 million worldwide, grossing more than $20 million per film.)
Invasion of Astro-Monster	1971	$20,000,000	Godzilla	Toho	(Note: By 1977, the first thirteen Godzilla films had grossed more than $260 million worldwide, grossing more than $20 million per film.)
Godzilla vs. Megalon	1976	$20,000,000	Godzilla	Toho	(Note: By 1977, the first thirteen Godzilla films had grossed more than $260 million worldwide, grossing more than $20 million per film.)
Godzilla vs. Gigan	1977	$20,000,000	Godzilla	Toho	(Note: By 1977, the first thirteen Godzilla films had grossed more than $260 million worldwide, grossing more than $20 million per film.)
Godzilla	1978	$20,562,711	Godzilla	Toho	
Godzilla vs. Mechagodzilla	1978	$34,122,958	Godzilla	Toho	
Superman	1978	$43,697,365^{*}	Superman	DC	
Superman	1979	$134,218,018^{*}	Superman	DC	
Superman	1980	$260,000,000	Superman	DC	
Superman	1981	$300,218,018	Superman	DC	
Batman	1989	$411,348,924	Batman	DC	
The Matrix	1999	$463,517,383	Neo	Warner	
Spider-Man	2002	$821,708,551	Spider-Man	Marvel	
Spider-Man 3	2007	$890,871,626	Spider-Man	Marvel	
The Dark Knight	2008	$1,004,558,444	Batman	DC	
The Avengers	2012	$1,518,812,988	Avengers	Marvel	
Avengers: Infinity War	2018	$2,048,359,754	Avengers	Marvel	
Avengers: Endgame	2019	$2,799,439,100	Avengers	Marvel	
Avengers: Endgame	2026	$2,942,318,540	Avengers	Marvel	

^{R} Distributor rentals. (Note: The gross rental is the distributor's share of the box-office gross and was more commonly reported than the exhibition gross up to the 1970s.)
^{*} US and Canada gross only.

=== Biggest opening weekends ===
Fifteen films since 1965 have held the record for highest-grossing worldwide opening weekend for a superhero film. Seven of the films are based on Marvel Comics, while six films are based on DC Comics. Batman has held the record four times, while Superman, Spider-Man and the Avengers have held the record three times each.

Title	Year	Record-setting gross	Superhero(es)	Source	Ref
King Kong vs. Godzilla	1962	$164,900 ^{R}	Godzilla	Toho	
King Kong vs. Godzilla	1963	$337,911^{*} ^{R}	Godzilla	Toho	
Godzilla vs. Megalon	1976	$383,744^{*} ^{R} (Note: Within three days of its 1976 US release, the film earned $383,744 in Texas and Louisiana alone.)	Godzilla	Toho	
Superman	1978	$7,465,343^{*}	Superman	DC	
Superman II	1981	$14,100,523^{*}	Superman	DC	
Batman	1989	$40,489,746^{*}	Batman	DC	
Batman Returns	1992	$45,687,711^{*}	Batman	DC	
Batman Forever	1995	$52,784,433^{*}	Batman	DC	
Spider-Man	2002	$125,900,000	Spider-Man	Marvel	
X2	2003	$154,800,000	X-Men	Marvel	
Spider-Man 2	2004	$189,400,000	Spider-Man	Marvel	
Spider-Man 3	2007	$381,700,000	Spider-Man	Marvel	
The Avengers	2012	$392,500,000	Avengers	Marvel	
Batman v Superman: Dawn of Justice	2016	$422,500,000	Batman, Superman	DC	
Avengers: Infinity War	2018	$640,500,000	Avengers	Marvel	
Avengers: Endgame	2019	$1,223,600,000	Avengers	Marvel	

^{*} US and Canada gross only.
^{R} Distributor rentals.

== Highest-grossing films by year ==
The following is a list of the highest-grossing superhero film by year since 1966. Some years have no superhero films. Batman has topped six years, while Godzilla has topped twelve years, the most of any superhero. The Marvel Cinematic Universe has topped fourteen years (every year of the 2010s, 2021–2024), the most for a franchise. Films based on Marvel Comics have topped twenty three years, the most for a source.

† Background shading indicates films playing in the week commencing 19 November 2026 in theaters around the world.

Year	Film	Worldwide gross	Superhero(es)	Source	Ref
2026	Spider-Man: Brand New Day †	$2,521,157,572	Spider-Man	Marvel	
2025	Superman	$618,723,803	Superman	DC	
2024	Deadpool & Wolverine	$1,338,073,645	Deadpool and Wolverine	Marvel	
2023	Guardians of the Galaxy Vol. 3	$845,555,777	Guardians of the Galaxy	Marvel	
2022	Doctor Strange in the Multiverse of Madness	$955,775,804	Doctor Strange	Marvel	
2021	Spider-Man: No Way Home	$1,922,598,800 ($1,910,982,770)	Spider-Man	Marvel	
2020	Sonic the Hedgehog	$319,715,683	Sonic the Hedgehog	Sega	
2019	Avengers: Endgame †	$2,942,318,540 ($2,799,439,100)	Avengers	Marvel	
2018	Avengers: Infinity War	$2,048,359,754	Avengers	Marvel	
2017	Spider-Man: Homecoming	$880,166,924	Spider-Man	Marvel	
2016	Captain America: Civil War	$1,153,304,495	Captain America	Marvel	
2015	Avengers: Age of Ultron	$1,405,403,694	Avengers	Marvel	
2014	Guardians of the Galaxy	$773,328,629	Guardians of the Galaxy	Marvel	
2013	Iron Man 3	$1,214,811,252	Iron Man	Marvel	
2012	The Avengers	$1,518,812,988	Avengers	Marvel	
2011	Thor	$449,326,618	Thor	Marvel	
2010	Iron Man 2	$623,933,331	Iron Man	Marvel	
2009	X-Men Origins: Wolverine	$373,062,864	Wolverine	Marvel	
2008	The Dark Knight	$1,005,973,645 ($997,039,412)	Batman	DC	
2007	Spider-Man 3	$890,871,626	Spider-Man	Marvel	
2006	X-Men: The Last Stand	$459,359,555	X-Men	Marvel	
2005	Batman Begins	$374,218,673 ($371,853,783)	Batman	DC	
2004	Spider-Man 2	$783,766,341	Spider-Man	Marvel	
2003	The Matrix Reloaded	$739,412,035	Neo	Warner	
2002	Spider-Man	$821,708,551	Spider-Man	Marvel	
2001	Kamen Rider Agito: Project G4	$10,300,000	Kamen Rider	Toei	
2000	X-Men	$296,339,527	X-Men	Marvel	
1999	The Matrix	$465,343,787	Neo	Warner	
1998	The Mask of Zorro	$250,288,523	Zorro	Popular Publications	
1997	Batman and Robin	$238,235,915 ($238,207,122)	Batman	DC	
1996	The Crow: City of Angels	$17,917,287^{*}	The Crow	Caliber	
1995	Batman Forever	$336,567,531 ($336,529,144)	Batman	DC	
1994	The Mask	$351,583,407	The Mask	Dark Horse Comics	
1993	Teenage Mutant Ninja Turtles III	$42,273,609^{*}	Teenage Mutant Ninja Turtles	Mirage	
1992	Batman Returns	$$266,832,411 (266,822,354)	Batman	DC	
1991	Teenage Mutant Ninja Turtles II: The Secret of the Ooze	$78,656,813^{*}	Teenage Mutant Ninja Turtles	Mirage	
1990	Teenage Mutant Ninja Turtles	$202,084,756	Teenage Mutant Ninja Turtles	Mirage	
1989	Batman	$411,556,825 (411,508,343)	Batman	DC	
1988	Dragon Ball: Mystical Adventure	$26,214,846	Goku	Shueisha	(Note: See Dragon Ball: Mystical Adventure § Box office)
1987	Superman IV: The Quest for Peace	$30,281,020	Superman	DC	
1986	Howard the Duck	$37,962,774	Howard the Duck	Marvel	
1985	Red Sonja	$6,948,633	Red Sonja	Marvel	
1984	Conan the Destroyer	$31,042,035	Conan	Weird Tales/Marvel	
1983	Superman III	$80,250,623	Superman	DC	
1982	Conan the Barbarian	$79,114,085	Conan	Weird Tales/Marvel	
1981	Superman II	$216,385,706	Superman	DC	
1980	Flash Gordon	$27,107,960^{*}	Flash Gordon	King Features	
1979	TBD				
1978	Superman: The Movie	$300,451,603 ($300,218,018)	Superman	DC	
1976– 1977	TBD				
1975	Terror of Mechagodzilla	$20,000,000	Godzilla	Toho	
1974	Godzilla vs. Mechagodzilla	$34,122,958	Godzilla	Toho	
1973	Godzilla vs. Megalon	$20,000,000	Godzilla	Toho	
1972	Godzilla vs. Gigan	$20,000,000	Godzilla	Toho	
1971	Godzilla vs. Hedorah	$20,000,000	Godzilla	Toho	
1969	All Monsters Attack	$20,000,000	Godzilla	Toho	
1968	Destroy All Monsters	$20,000,000	Godzilla	Toho	
1967	Son of Godzilla	$20,000,000	Godzilla	Toho	
1966	Ebirah, Horror of the Deep	$20,000,000	Godzilla	Toho	
1965	Invasion of Astro-Monster	$20,000,000	Godzilla	Toho	
1964	Ghidorah	$20,000,000	Godzilla	Toho	
1962	King Kong vs. Godzilla	$20,000,000	Godzilla	Toho	
1955	Godzilla Raids Again	$20,000,000	Godzilla	Toho	
1954	Godzilla	$20,562,711	Godzilla	Toho	

^{TBD} To be determined.
^{*} US and Canada gross only.

== Box office ticket sales ==
Films must sell at least 50 million tickets to be listed. The Marvel Cinematic Universe contains the most entries on the list, with eight films in total. The Avengers series is next, with four films on the list. In total, thirteen of the films below are based on the Marvel Comics.

† Background shading indicates films playing in the week commencing 19 November 2026 in theaters around the world.

Film	Year	Ticket sales (est.)	Territories included (Note: Box office territories for which the film's ticket sales data are currently known)	Superhero	Source	Ref
Avengers: Endgame †	2019	351,491,996	Worldwide	Avengers	Marvel	(Note: Avengers: Endgame: Argentina, Bolivia, Brazil, Chile, Colombia, Croatia, France, Greece, Hungary, India, Japan, Mexico, Netherlands, Paraguay, Peru, Romania, Russia, Serbia, Spain, Sweden, Switzerland, Ukraine, United Arab Emirates, United Kingdom, Uruguay – 129,848,444; United States and Canada – 95,268,900; China – 86,742,449; Austria, Belgium, Bosnia and Herzegovina, Bulgaria, Cyprus, Czech Republic, Denmark, Estonia, Finland, Germany, Iceland, Ireland, Italy, Latvia, Lithuania, Luxembourg, Montenegro, North Macedonia, Norway, Poland, Portugal, Slovakia, Slovenia, Turkey – 19,795,480; South Korea – 13,977,692; Australia – 5,859,031)
Spider-Man: Brand New Day †	2026	280,000,000	Worldwide	Spider-Man	Marvel	
Avengers: Infinity War	2018	265,084,467	Worldwide	Avengers	Marvel	(Note: Avengers: Infinity War: Argentina, Australia, Brazil, Chile, Colombia, Mexico, Russia, South Korea, Ukraine, United States and Canada – 144,859,977; China – 62,908,947; Austria, Belgium, Bosnia and Herzegovina, Bulgaria, Croatia, Cyprus, Czech Republic, Denmark, Estonia, France, Germany, Greece, Iceland, Ireland, Italy, Latvia, Lithuania, Luxembourg, Montenegro, Morocco, Netherlands, North Macedonia, Norway, Portugal, Romania, Slovakia, Slovenia, Spain, Sweden, Turkey, United Kingdom – 32,816,784; India – 17,400,000; Poland, Serbia, Venezuela – 2,741,809; Japan – 2,500,000; United Arab Emirates – 733,300; Hungary – 576,407; Switzerland – 312,709; Finland – 234,534)
Spider-Man: No Way Home	2021	245,287,629	Worldwide	Spider-Man	Marvel	(Note: Spider-Man: No Way Home: Argentina, Australia, Brazil, Chile, Colombia, Croatia, Greece, Indonesia, Mexico, Netherlands, New Zealand, Poland, Romania, Russia, Saudi Arabia, Serbia, South Korea, Spain, Sweden, Switzerland, Turkey, Ukraine, United Arab Emirates, United Kingdom, Venezuela – 116,426,930; United States and Canada – 88,780,270; India – 11,000,000; France – 7,387,844; Austria, Belgium, Bosnia and Herzegovina, Bulgaria, Cyprus, Czech Republic, Denmark, Estonia, Finland, Hungary, Iceland, Ireland, Latvia, Lithuania, Luxembourg, Montenegro, North Macedonia, Norway, Portugal, Slovakia, Slovenia – 6,817,614; Germany – 4,671,011; Bolivia, Paraguay, Peru – 3,972,621; Italy – 3,411,339; Japan – 2,820,000)
Avengers: Age of Ultron	2015	166,509,843	Worldwide	Avengers	Marvel	(Note: Avengers: Age of Ultron: Brazil, Chile, Mexico, South Korea, United States and Canada – 92,038,052; China – 36,609,750; Austria, Belgium, Bosnia and Herzegovina, Bulgaria, Croatia, Czech Republic, Denmark, Estonia, Finland, Greece, Hungary, Iceland, Ireland, Italy, Latvia, Lithuania, Montenegro, Morocco, Netherlands, Norway, Poland, Portugal, Slovakia, Slovenia, Spain, Sweden, Turkey, United Kingdom – 17,404,252; France and Russia – 10,362,923; Argentina, Bolivia, Colombia, Paraguay, Peru, Romania, Ukraine, Uruguay – 7,445,289; Germany – 2,423,753; Switzerland – 225,824)
The Avengers	2012	166,366,729	Worldwide	Avengers	Marvel	(Note: The Avengers: Austria, Belgium, Bulgaria, Croatia, Czech Republic, Denmark, Estonia, Greece, Hungary, Ireland, Italy, Latvia, Netherlands, North Macedonia, Norway, Poland, Portugal, Slovakia, Slovenia, Spain, Sweden, Turkey, United Kingdom, United States and Canada – 95,857,269; Argentina, Australia, Brazil, Chile, Mexico – 35,055,472; China and Romania – 13,521,881; Finland, Iceland, Japan, Russia, Ukraine – 7,863,137; South Korea – 7,087,068; France – 4,505,704; Germany – 2,261,073; Switzerland – 215,125)
Incredibles 2	2018	159,064,742	Worldwide	The Incredibles	Pixar	(Note: Incredibles 2: Australia, Brazil, Chile, Colombia, Mexico, United States and Canada – 100,893,812; Austria, Belgium, Bosnia and Herzegovina, Bulgaria, Croatia, Cyprus, Czech Republic, Denmark, Estonia, Finland, France, Germany, Greece, Hungary, Iceland, Ireland, Italy, Latvia, Lithuania, Luxembourg, Montenegro, Morocco, Netherlands, North Macedonia, Norway, Romania, Slovakia, Slovenia, Spain, Sweden, Turkey, United Kingdom – 28,778,575; China – 10,122,096; Poland, Russia, Venezuela – 7,317,439; Japan – 4,060,000; Argentina – 3,530,866; South Korea – 3,033,105; Portugal – 606,756; Ukraine – 474,430; Switzerland – 247,663)
Black Panther	2018	149,894,217	Worldwide	Black Panther	Marvel	(Note: Black Panther: Austria, Belgium, Bosnia and Herzegovina, Bulgaria, Croatia, Cyprus, Czech Republic, Denmark, Estonia, Finland, France, Greece, Hungary, Iceland, Ireland, Italy, Latvia, Lithuania, Luxembourg, Montenegro, Morocco, Netherlands, North Macedonia, Norway, Poland, Portugal, Romania, Slovakia, Slovenia, Spain, Sweden, Turkey, United Kingdom, United States and Canada – 95,947,317; Brazil, Chile, Colombia, Mexico, Russia, Ukraine, Venezuela – 26,179,100; China – 18,405,278; South Korea – 5,399,327; Germany – 1,798,330; Japan – 1,030,000; Argentina – 932,645; Switzerland – 202,220)
Spider-Man: Far From Home	2019	140,345,269	Worldwide	Spider-Man	Marvel	(Note: Spider-Man: Far From Home: United States and Canada – 43,340,300; China – 39,380,000; Austria, Belgium, Bosnia and Herzegovina, Bulgaria, Croatia, Cyprus, Czech Republic, Denmark, Estonia, Finland, France, Germany, Greece, Hungary, Iceland, Ireland, Italy, Latvia, Lithuania, Luxembourg, Montenegro, Netherlands, North Macedonia, Norway, Poland, Portugal, Slovenia, United Kingdom – 16,787,648; Mexico – 10,810,870; South Korea – 8,023,606; Brazil – 6,562,228; Russia – 5,646,679; Spain – 2,305,169; Japan – 2,100,000; India – 1,856,875; Argentina – 1,285,785; Turkey – 942,651; Ukraine – 747,063; Romania – 249,505; Switzerland – 171,621; Slovakia – 135,269)
Spider-Man	2002	126,654,574	Worldwide	Spider-Man	Marvel	(Note: Spider-Man: Austria, Belgium, Bulgaria, Cyprus, Czech Republic, Denmark, Estonia, Finland, Germany, Hungary, Iceland, Ireland, Italy, Latvia, Lithuania, Luxembourg, Netherlands, Norway, Poland, Romania, Slovakia, Sweden, Switzerland, Turkey, United Kingdom, United States and Canada – 93,101,972; Brazil, France, Spain – 20,215,161; Argentina, Australia, Japan – 10,161,873; China – 2,050,000; South Korea – 1,125,568)
The Dark Knight Rises	2012	121,771,548	Worldwide	Batman	DC	
Superman: The Movie	1978	117,872,453	Worldwide	Superman	DC	(Note: Superman: China – 37.89 million; Other territories – 79,982,453)
The Dark Knight	2008	115,688,414	Americas, EU, Australia, Korea	Batman	DC	(Note: The Dark Knight: United States and Canada – 74,506,000; Europe (excluding Russia) – 24,750,772; Argentina, Australia, Brazil, Russia – 12,256,116; South Korea – 4,175,526)
Spider-Man 3	2007	111,669,999	Worldwide	Spider-Man	Marvel	(Note: Spider-Man 3: Austria, Belgium, Czech Republic, Denmark, Estonia, Finland, Hungary, Iceland, Ireland, Latvia, Netherlands, Norway, Poland, Portugal, Romania, Slovakia, Slovenia, Spain, Sweden, Switzerland, Turkey, United Kingdom, United States and Canada – 64,501,205; Brazil, China, Japan, Russia, South Korea, Ukraine – 24,387,326; India – 10,000,000; France and Italy – 9,576,880; Germany – 3,204,588)
Spider-Man: Homecoming	2017	106,696,120	Worldwide	Spider-Man	Marvel	(Note: Spider-Man: Homecoming: United States and Canada – 37,418,200; China – 21,891,581; Austria, Belgium, Bosnia and Herzegovina, Bulgaria, Croatia, Cyprus, Czech Republic, Denmark, Estonia, Finland, France, Germany, Greece, Hungary, Iceland, Ireland, Italy, Latvia, Lithuania, Luxembourg, Morocco, Netherlands, North Macedonia, Poland, Portugal, Romania, Slovakia, Slovenia, Sweden, Turkey, United Kingdom – 12,776,388; Mexico – 9,846,562; Chile, South Korea, Venezuela – 8,872,619; Brazil – 6,715,848; Russia – 4,050,314; Japan – 1,930,000; Spain – 1,768,971; Argentina – 1,118,453; Norway – 192,088; Switzerland – 115,096)
Spider-Man 2	2004	105,707,690	Worldwide	Spider-Man	Marvel	(Note: Spider-Man 2: Austria, Belgium, Bulgaria, Czech Republic, Denmark, Estonia, Finland, Hungary, Iceland, Ireland, Latvia, Luxembourg, Netherlands, Poland, Portugal, Romania, Slovakia, Slovenia, Spain, Sweden, Switzerland, Turkey, United Kingdom, United States and Canada – 75,624,995; Brazil, Japan, Norway – 12,869,224; France and Italy – 8,948,733; Germany – 3,291,034; China – 2,606,000; South Korea – 2,367,704)
The Incredibles	2004	81,622,988	Worldwide	The Incredibles	Pixar	(Note: The Incredibles: Austria, Belgium, Bulgaria, Czech Republic, Denmark, Estonia, Finland, France, Hungary, Iceland, Ireland, Latvia, Luxembourg, Netherlands, Norway, Poland, Portugal, Romania, Slovakia, Slovenia, Sweden, Switzerland, Turkey, United Kingdom, United States and Canada – 61,022,168; Brazil, Japan, Spain – 12,861,883; Germany – 3,502,028; Italy – 3,081,842; South Korea – 1,155,067)
The Amazing Spider-Man	2012	79,765,238	Worldwide	Spider-Man	Marvel	(Note: The Amazing Spider-Man: United States and Canada – 33,677,900; China, Iceland, Japan, Mexico, Russia, Ukraine – 20,543,241; Austria, Belgium, Bulgaria, Croatia, Czech Republic, Denmark, Estonia, Finland, Greece, Hungary, Italy, Latvia, Netherlands, North Macedonia, Norway, Poland, Portugal, Romania, Slovakia, Slovenia, Spain, Sweden, Turkey, United Kingdom – 10,125,549; Argentina and Brazil – 6,331,883; South Korea – 4,853,273; France and Germany – 4,104,269; Switzerland – 129,123)
The Amazing Spider-Man 2	2014	71,764,849	Worldwide	Spider-Man	Marvel	(Note: The Amazing Spider-Man 2: Austria, Belgium, Bulgaria, Croatia, Cyprus, Czech Republic, Denmark, Estonia, Finland, France, Germany, Greece, Hungary, Iceland, Italy, Lithuania, Montenegro, Morocco, Netherlands, North Macedonia, Norway, Poland, Portugal, Romania, Russia, Slovakia, Slovenia, Sweden, Switzerland, Turkey, United Kingdom, United States and Canada – 38,959,914; China – 14,998,134; Mexico and Ukraine – 7,747,764; South Korea – 4,168,353; Brazil – 4,100,390; Spain – 1,016,878; Argentina – 773,416)

== See also ==
- Lists of highest-grossing films
  - List of highest-grossing films
  - List of highest-grossing media franchises
- Blockbuster mentality
- List of American superhero films
