= Eteuati Tema =

New Zealand visual effects artist

- Born: New Zealand
- Occupations: Animator, face motion editor and visual effects artist
- Years active: 2009-present

Eteuati "Jack" Tema is a New Zealand visual effects artist. He is known for working on films such as Avatar, Dawn of the Planet of the Apes and The Jungle Book.

== Awards ==
He won a 2015 Annie Award for Outstanding Achievement, Character Animation in a Live Action Production for his work on Dawn of the Planet of the Apes.

== Selected filmography ==
- Avatar (2009)
- Dawn of the Planet of the Apes (2014)
- The Jungle Book (2016)
