= G-Fest =

Annual convention devoted to the Godzilla franchise and other kaiju films

- Status: Active
- Genre: Science fiction, kaiju and tokusatsu fiction
- Frequency: Annual
- Country: United States
- Inaugurated: 1994; 32 years ago
- Website: http://www.g-fan.com/

G-Fest, often typeset as G-FEST, is an annual convention devoted to the Godzilla film franchise and other kaiju (literally strange beast, also the name of the genre of Japanese giant monster movies) franchises such as Gamera and the Ultra Series. G-Fest is staged by Daikaiju Enterprises, Ltd., and G-Fan magazine. It regularly features panels, contests, and theatrically screened films of interest to fans of Japanese monsters.

Actors, directors, special effects technicians, and other famous people who worked on Godzilla, Ultraman, Gamera, and other kaiju movies in Japan are frequent guests at G-Fest. Often, the major guest is honored with the coveted "Mangled Skyscraper Award" for their lasting contributions to the kaiju genre.

G-Fest was founded in 1994 by J. D. Lees, publisher of G-Fan magazine and the G-Fan website, and the late John Rocco Roberto.

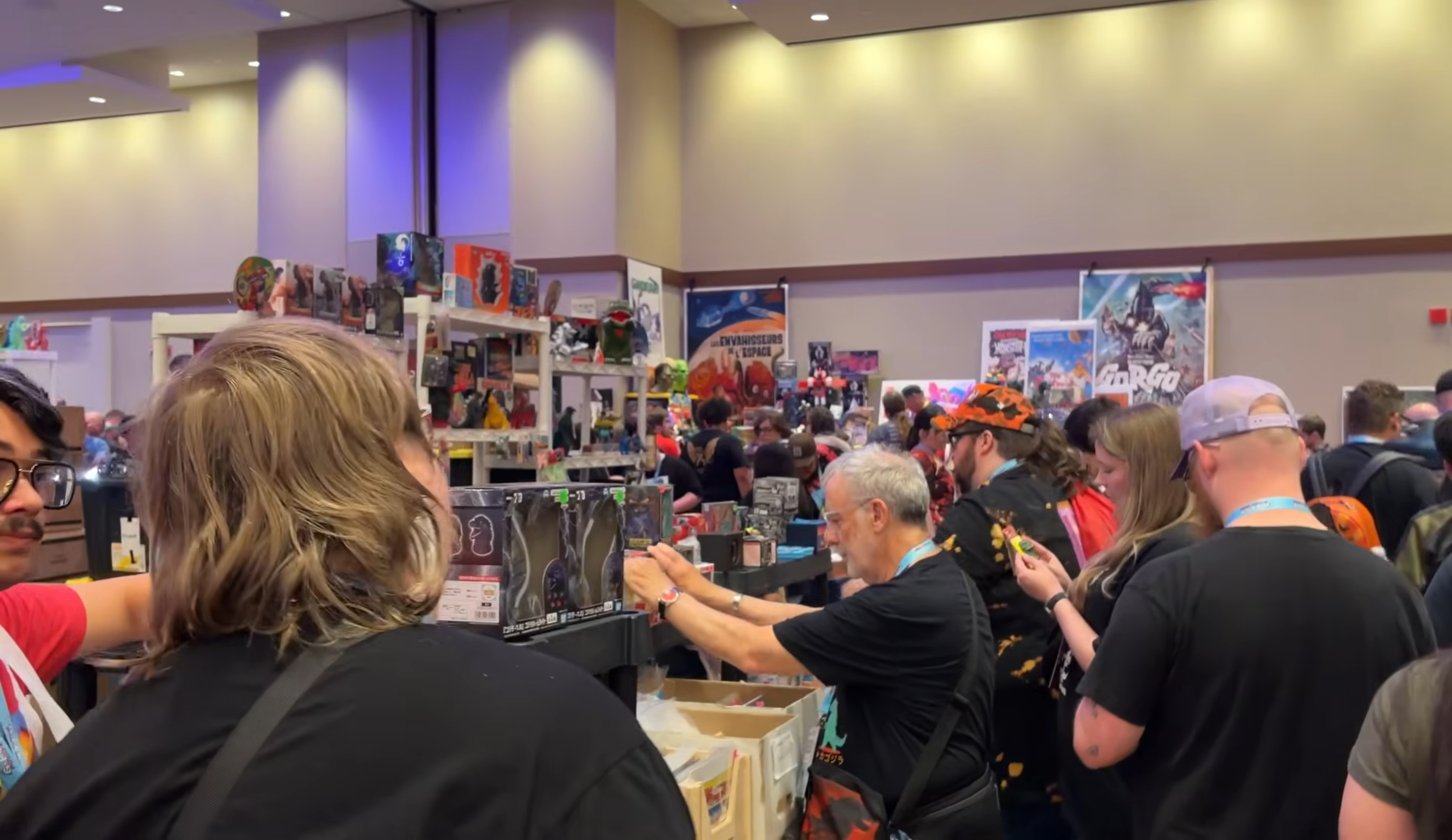
Various merchandise being sold at G-Fest in 2026

G-Fest features a Dealer's Room, a costume parade, a model show and competition, and a fan film competition. Other popular activities are film screenings (held at the Pickwick Theater in Park Ridge, Illinois) video game tournaments, children's activities, and autograph sessions. G-Fest also raises money for charitable causes.

In May 2020, Daikaiju Enterprises, Ltd. made the decision to cancel G-Fest for the first time in its 27-year history due to restrictions on large gatherings imposed by Illinois governor J. B. Pritzker in response to the COVID-19 pandemic. Its initial 27th annual convention was to be moved to the future date of July 2021, but was cancelled again, due to the continuing effect of COVID-19.

== Conventions ==
G-Fest (Friends of G-Fan) '94

- First public meeting of contributors to G-Fan, Howard Johnson Hotel, O'Hare Airport, Illinois

G-Fest (G-Con) '95

- Date: August 18–20, 1995
- First organized convention. The first two days were closed to the public until news reports spread then was open to the public on the last day (3rd)
- Radisson Hotel, Arlington Heights, Illinois

G-Fest (G-Con) '96

- Guests: Kenpachiro Satsuma, Haruo Nakajima
- Radisson Hotel, Arlington Heights, Illinois

G-Fest (G-Con) '97

- Guests: Don Glut, Marc Cerasini, Bob Eggleton, Stuart Galbraith IV, David Kalat, Steve Ryfle
- Wyndham Hotel, Chicago, Illinois

G-Fest '98

- Guests: William Stout, Mike Fredericks, Yoshikazu Ishii, Gene Rizzardi
- Wyndham Hotel, Chicago, Illinois

G-Fest '99

- Date: July 23–25, 1999
- Guests: Noriaki Yuasa, Shusuke Kaneko, Wataru Mimura, Hiroshi Kashiwabara, Robert Scott Field, Volker Engel, Forrest J. Ackerman, Peter Fernandez, Corrine Orr, August Ragone, Norman England, Hisataka Kitaoka (now Ryuki Kitaoka), Don Glut
- Films: Gamera 3: The Revenge of Iris (US premiere), Ultraman Gaia: The Battle in Hyperspace
- Mangled Skyscraper Award presented to: Forrest J. Ackerman
- Burbank Hilton, Burbank, California

G-Fest 2000

- Date: Oct 14–16, 2000
- Guests: Sadamasa Arikawa, Noriaki Yuasa, Koichi Kawakita, Haruo Nakajima, Kenpachiro Satsuma, Megumi Odaka, Keita Amemiya, Yuji Sakai, Hisataka Kitaoka (now Ryuki Kitaoka), August Ragone, Mach Fumiake, Robert Scott Field,
- Films: Godzilla (1954), Moon Over Tao (1997), Godzilla vs. Destoroyah, Son of Godzilla, Ultraman Tiga: The Final Odyssey, Ring (1998), Rebirth of Mothra III, Ultraman Tiga: The Final Odyssey
- Mangled Skyscraper Award presented to: Koichi Kawakita
- Hollywood Roosevelt, Los Angeles, California

G-Fest '01

- Date: July 13–15, 2001
- Guests: Shinichi Wakasa, Greg Shoemaker, Bob Eggleton, Robert Scott Field
- Films: Godzilla (1954), Godzilla vs. Mechagodzilla II, Godzilla vs. SpaceGodzilla
- Mangled Skyscraper Award presented to: Greg Shoemaker
- Radisson Hotel, Arlington Heights, Illinois

G-Fest '02

- Date: July 12–14, 2002
- Guests: Koichi Kawakita, Hurricane Ryu, Robert Scott Field
- Films: Godzilla vs. Destoroyah, Gamera 2: Attack of Legion, Godzilla vs. Megaguirus
- Mangled Skyscraper Award presented to: Stan G. Hyde
- Radisson Hotel, Arlington Heights, Illinois

G-Fest X

- Date: July 18–20, 2003
- Guests: Noriaki Yuasa, Carl Craig, Yoshikazu Ishii, Robert Scott Field
- Films: Battle in Outer Space, Gamera 3: The Revenge of Iris, Godzilla, Mothra and King Ghidorah: Giant Monsters All-Out Attack
- Mangled Skyscraper Award presented to: Noriaki Yuasa
- Radisson Hotel, Arlington Heights, Illinois

G-Fest XI

- Date: July 9–11, 2004
- Guests: Teruyoshi Nakano, Robert Scott Field, Brian Thomas
- Films: Monster Zero, Terror of Mechagodzilla, Godzilla: Tokyo S.O.S.
- Mangled Skyscraper Award presented to: Teruyoshi Nakano
- Holiday Inn O'Hare International, Rosemont, Illinois

G-Fest XII

- Date: July 8–10, 2005
- Guests: Yoshimitsu Banno, Yoshikazu Ishii, Carl Craig, Robert Scott Field, Robert Conte
- Films: The H-Man, Godzilla vs. Hedorah, Godzilla: Final Wars
- Mangled Skyscraper Award presented to: Yoshikazu Ishii
- Crowne Plaza O'Hare International, Rosemont, Illinois

G-Fest XIII

- Date: July 7–9, 2006
- Guests: Kazuki Ōmori, Yoshikazu Ishii, Robert Scott Field, Robert Conte
- Films: Godzilla vs. King Ghidorah, Negadon: The Monster from Mars, Gamera the Brave
- Mangled Skyscraper Award presented to: Robert Scott Field
- Crowne Plaza O'Hare International, Rosemont, Illinois

G-Fest XIV

- Date: July 6–8, 2007
- Guests: Rhodes Reason, Shelley Sweeney, Carl Craig, Robert Scott Field, Don Glut and Reiko Yamada
- Saturday Afternoon Concert Performed by: Rieko Wada, Tomomi Matsumura, Shetoshi Yamada, Marcus Dunleavy
- Films: King Kong Escapes, King Kong vs. Godzilla
- Mangled Skyscraper Award presented to: Don Glut
- Crowne Plaza O'Hare International, Rosemont, Illinois

G-Fest XV

- Date: July 4–6, 2008
- Guests: Haruo Nakajima, Don Frye, August Ragone, Robert Scott Field, Don Glut, Jörg Buttgereit
- Films: Matango, Destroy All Monsters, Godzilla vs. Gigan, Godzilla vs. Biollante, Orochi the Eight-Headed Dragon, and Godzilla Against Mechagodzilla
- Mangled Skyscraper Award presented to: Haruo Nakajima
- Crowne Plaza O'Hare International, Rosemont, Illinois

G-Fest XVI

- Date: July 3–5, 2009
- Guests: Kenji Sahara, Robert Scott Field, August Ragone, David Kalat
- Films: Godzilla, Mothra and King Ghidorah: Giant Monsters All-Out Attack, The Mysterians, Mothra vs. Godzilla, The Monster X Strikes Back/Attack the G8 Summit
- Mangled Skyscraper Award presented to: Kenji Sahara
- Crowne Plaza O'Hare International, Rosemont, Illinois

G-Fest XVII

- Date: July 9–11, 2010
- Guests: Akira Takarada, Bob Eggleton, Robert Scott Field, William M. Tsutsui, David Kalat, Damon Foster
- Films: Son of Godzilla, Godzilla vs. Mothra, Godzilla 2000, Godzilla vs. Megaguirus, Godzilla vs the Sea Monster, Godzilla (1954)
- Mangled Skyscraper Award presented to: Akira Takarada
- Rosemont Hotel at O'Hare, Rosemont, Illinois

G-Fest XVIII

- Date: July 15–17, 2011
- Guests: Hiroyuki Watanabe, Shinji Higuchi, Hiroshi Sagae, Robert Scott Field, August Ragone
- Films: Gamera: Super Monster, Mothra, Godzilla vs. Mechagodzilla II, Gamera: Guardian of the Universe, Ultraman Tiga & Ultraman Dyna & Ultraman Gaia: Battle in Hyperspace, Gamera 2: Advent of Legion
- Mangled Skyscraper Award presented to: Shinji Higuchi
- Crowne Plaza O'Hare, Rosemont, Illinois

G-Fest XIX

- Date: July 13–15, 2012
- Guests: Akira Takarada, Satoshi Furuya, Robert Scott Field, Svengoolie
- Films: King Kong (1933), The Beast from 20,000 Fathoms, Gorgo, Gamera, Godzilla, King of the Monsters!, Godzilla vs. Destoroyah
- Mangled Skyscraper Award presented to: Bin "Satoshi" Furuya
- Crowne Plaza O'Hare, Rosemont, Illinois

G-Fest XX

- Date: July 12–14, 2013
- Guests: Tsutomu Kitagawa, Shinichi Wakasa, Shizuo Nakajima, Robert Scott Field, Frank H Woodward, Cleve Hall
- Films: 20 Million Miles to Earth, Gamera 3: The Revenge of Iris, Gamera vs. Gyaos, The X From Outer Space, Pacific Rim (Midnight showing), Godzilla vs. SpaceGodzilla, Godzilla vs. Megaguirus
- Mangled Skyscraper Award presented to: Shinichi Wakasa
- Crowne Plaza O'Hare, Rosemont, Illinois

G-Fest XXI

- Date: July 11–13, 2014
- Guests: Koichi Kawakita, Tomoko Ai, Katsuhiko Sasaki, Hiroshi Sagae, Don Frye, Robert Scott Field, Shinpei Hayashiya
- Films: King Kong (1976), King Kong Lives, Gamera vs. Barugon, Yongary, Monster from the Deep (1967), Godzilla vs. Destoroyah, Godzilla vs. King Ghidorah
- Mangled Skyscraper Award presented to: Bob Eggleton
- G-FAN Hall of Fame inductees: Tim Bean, John DeSentis and Chris Oglio
- Crowne Plaza O'Hare, Rosemont, Illinois

G-Fest XXII

- Date: July 10–12, 2015
- Guests: Masaaki Tezuka, Noboru Kaneko, August Ragone, Robert Scott Field, Kow Otani
- Films: Them!, The Deadly Mantis, Gamera vs. Jiger, Gamera: Guardian of the Universe, Godzilla vs. Biollante, Godzilla vs. Megaguirus
- Mangled Skyscraper Award presented to: Masaaki Tezuka
- G-FAN Hall of Fame inductees: August Ragone, Matt Frank, and Tom Tvrdik
- Crowne Plaza O'Hare, Rosemont, Illinois

G-Fest XXIII

- Date: July 15–17, 2016
- Guests: Akira Takarada, Linda Miller, Satoshi Furuya, Hiroko Sakurai, Robert Scott Field, August Ragone, Yoshikazu Ishii, Hiroshi Sagae, Carl Craig, Sojiro Uchino, Tony Isabella, C. Martin Croker
- Films: King Kong Escapes, Godzilla vs. King Ghidorah, Yongary, Monster from the Deep (1967), Gamera vs. Viras, The Green Slime, Mega Monster Battle: Ultra Galaxy
- Mangled Skyscraper Award presented to: Hiroko Sakurai
- G-FAN Hall of Fame Award inductees: Damon Foster, Ed Godziszewski, and John Roberto (posthumously)
- Crowne Plaza O'Hare, Rosemont, Illinois

G-Fest XXIV

- Date: July 14–16, 2017
- Guests: Michiru Ōshima, Yuji Kaida, Shinji Higuchi, Ryuki Kitaoka, Kazuhiro Nakagawa, Kiyotaka Taguchi, Robert Scott Field, Tony Isabella
- Films: King Kong vs. Godzilla, D-War, Godzilla vs. Megaguirus, Godzilla (2014), Kong: Skull Island, Shin Godzilla
- Mangled Skyscraper Award presented to: Michiru Ōshima
- G-FAN Lifetime Achievement Award presented to: Shinji Higuchi
- G-FAN Hall of Fame Award inductees: Jeff Horne, Sean Linkenback, and Kyle Yount
- Crowne Plaza O'Hare, Rosemont, Illinois

G-Fest XXV

- Date: July 13–15, 2018
- Guests: Megumi Odaka, Keizo Murase, Kenpachiro Satsuma, Don Frye, Gene Rizzardi
- Films: The Valley of Gwangi, Dinosaurus!, The Mighty Peking Man, Pacific Rim Uprising, Rampage, Godzilla vs. Mothra
- Mangled Skyscraper Award presented to: Megumi Odaka, Keizo Murase, Kenpachiro Satsuma
- G-FAN Hall of Fame Award inductees: Skip Peel, David Nunes, Paul Gavins
- Crowne Plaza O'Hare, Rosemont, Illinois

G-Fest XXVI

- Date: July 12–14, 2019
- Guests: Akira Takarada, Shusuke Kaneko, Peggy Neal, Yoshikazu Ishii, Sonoe Nakajima
- Films: All Monsters Attack, Ghidorah, the Three-Headed Monster, The X from Outer Space, Godzilla, Mothra and King Ghidorah: Giant Monsters All-Out Attack, Godzilla: King of the Monsters (2019), Invasion of Astro-Monster, Linking Love (2017)
- Mangled Skyscraper Award presented to: Shusuke Kaneko
- G-FAN Lifetime Achievement Award presented to: Akira Takarada
- G-FAN Hall of Fame Award inductees: Sonoe Nakajima, the Baioa Family, Martin Arlt
- Crowne Plaza O'Hare, Rosemont, Illinois

G-Fest XXVII

- Date: July 15-17, 2022
- Guests: Hiroyuki Kawase, Tomoko Ai
- Films: Godzilla vs. Hedorah, Godzilla vs. Megalon, Godzilla (1954), Godzilla vs the Sea Monster, Godzilla vs. Kong, Terror of Mechagodzilla
- G-FAN Hall of Fame Award inductees: Steve Ryfle, Diane Dougherty, Hiroshi Sagae
- Hyatt Regency O'Hare, Rosemont, Illinois

G-Fest XXVIII

- Date: July 14-16, 2023
- Guests: Yumiko Shaku, Don Frye, Linda Jo Miller, T.J. Storm
- Films: Destroy All Monsters, Godzilla (1998), Godzilla Raids Again, Shin Ultraman, Godzilla Against Mechagodzilla, Godzilla (2014)
- G-FAN Hall of Fame Award inductees: Andre Steele, Bill Gudmundson, Allan DeBus
- Hyatt Regency O'Hare, Rosemont, Illinois

G-Fest XXIX

- Date: July 12-14, 2024
- Guests: Rie Ōta, Allan Henry, Toshio Miike, Takuji Yamada, James Groman, Jeffrey Angles, Kiyotaka Taguchi
- Films: Mothra vs. Godzilla, Godzilla vs. Mechagodzilla, The Return of Godzilla, Godzilla vs. SpaceGodzilla, Godzilla: Final Wars, Godzilla x Kong: The New Empire
- G-FAN Hall of Fame Award inductees: Tristan Domay, Nicholas Cloutier, Stan Hyde
- Hyatt Regency O'Hare, Rosemont, Illinois

G-Fest XXX

- Date: July 11-13, 2025
- Guests: Bin Furuya, Shinichi Wakasa, Carl Craig, Hiroko Sakurai, Kiyotaka Taguchi, Kurt Carley, Noboru Kaneko, Yoshiro Uchida
- Films: Frankenstein Conquers The World, The War of the Gargantuas, Godzilla vs Destoroyah, Terror of Mechagodzilla, Godzilla vs. Megaguirus, Godzilla: King of the Monsters
- Mangled Skyscraper Award presented to: JD Lees
- G-FAN Lifetime Achievement Award presented to: Koichi Kawakita
- G-FAN Hall of Fame Award inductees: Mark and Sue Matzke, Dawn McKechnie, Joyce Boss
- Hyatt Regency O'Hare, Rosemont, Illinois

G-Fest XXXI

- Date: July 10-12, 2026
