= Godzilla vs. =

Godzilla vs. or vs. Godzilla may refer to:

== Film ==
- King Kong vs. Godzilla (1962)
- Mothra vs. Godzilla (1964), also released in the United States theatrically as Godzilla vs. the Thing, and some home media releases call it Godzilla vs. Mothra
- Godzilla vs. Monster Zero, the American title for Invasion of Astro-Monster (1965)
- Godzilla vs. the Sea Monster, the American title for Ebirah, Horror of the Deep (1966)
- Godzilla vs. Hedorah (1971), also released in the United States as Godzilla vs. the Smog Monster
- Godzilla vs. Gigan (1972)
- Godzilla vs. Megalon (1973)
- Godzilla vs. Mechagodzilla (1974), also released in the United States as Godzilla vs. the Bionic Monster and Godzilla vs. the Cosmic Monster
- Godzilla vs. Biollante (1989)
- Godzilla vs. King Ghidorah (1991)
- Godzilla vs. Mothra (1992)
- Godzilla vs. Mechagodzilla II (1993)
- Godzilla vs. SpaceGodzilla (1994)
- Godzilla vs. Destoroyah (1995)
- Godzilla vs. Megaguirus (2000)
- Godzilla vs. Kong (2021)

== Other ==
- Godzilla vs. Charles Barkley, a 1992 Nike television commercial
- Godzilla VS, the Japanese title for the video game, Godzilla (2014)
