= Monster Planet of Godzilla =

1994 film directed by Koichi Kawakita

- Title card
- Directed by: Kōichi Kawakita
- Written by: Marie Terunuma
- Produced by: Kiyoshi Suzuki; Yasuo Wakabayashi
- Starring: Megumi Odaka; Iemasa Kayumi; Megumi Hayashibara; Kaneto Shiozawa; Kenpachiro Satsuma
- Cinematography: Kenichi Eguchi
- Edited by: Sae Tojima
- Music by: Akira Ifukube (stock)
- Release date: March 18, 1994
- Running time: 6 minutes
- Country: Japan
- Language: Japanese

Monster Planet of Godzilla (Japanese: 怪獣プラネットゴジラ, Hepburn: Kaijū Puranetto Gojira) is a 1994 Japanese kaiju short film directed by Kōichi Kawakita. The film served as a theme park attraction that was screened at Sanrio Puroland and Harmony Land from March 18, 1994 to July 1, 1998. It is a 3-D motion simulator featuring specially filmed sequences of Godzilla battling the monsters Mothra and Rodan. All the monsters were portrayed using the costumes and props from the early 1990s Godzilla films. In addition, a new super-plane named Earth is introduced to thwart the monsters' destructive rampage.

== Cast ==
- Megumi Odaka as Miki Saegusa
- Iemasa Kayumi as Professor Dreamon (voice)
- Megumi Hayashibara as Hello Kitty (voice)
- Kaneto Shiozawa as Planet pilot (voice) / G-Force soldier (voice)
- Kenpachiro Satsuma as Godzilla

== Home media ==
The footage from the attraction was released as a bonus feature for the Japan-only Godzilla Final Box (with the Hello Kitty footage removed, possibly due to legal issues and the short's depiction of her as a general not particularly appropriate for the character).
