= Miki Saegusa =

Character from Godzilla film series

- Godzilla character
- Saegusa, as portrayed by Megumi Odaka in Godzilla vs. Destoroyah
- First appearance: Godzilla vs. Biollante (1989)
- Last appearance: Godzilla vs. Destoroyah (1995)
- Created by: Kazuki Ōmori; Shinichirō Kobayashi
- Portrayed by: Megumi Odaka

Miki Saegusa (三枝 未希, Saegusa Miki) is a fictional character from the Heisei series of Godzilla films. She is a psychic who uses her powers to communicate with and, in some instances, control Godzilla, and is credited for being the most frequently recurring human character in any kaiju (Japanese giant monster) series.

== Concept and casting ==
The outline of Saegusa's character was present in Shinichirō Kobayashi's winning entry in the competition for a possible sequel story for The Return of Godzilla which would eventually become Godzilla vs. Biollante, though the character was originally portrayed as a journalist investigating a scientist who accidentally created an amphibious rat monster called Deutalios. The character would have been led to the scientist's secret laboratory via psychic visions of talking flowers and subsequently discover that he had been splicing plant genes with those of his deceased daughter. It was ultimately director Kazuki Ōmori's decision to change Saegusa into a psychic.

Prior to assuming the role, Megumi Odaka had never seen a Godzilla film, and was initially scared of the Godzilla suit until she befriended suit performer Kenpachiro Satsuma.

== Character biography ==
=== Godzilla vs. Biollante (1989) ===
Saegusa made her debut in Godzilla vs. Biollante (1989). As well as being an instructor of an institution for psychic children, she also served as an assistant to Doctor Shiragami, a botanist studying the psychic energy of roses. Unbeknownst to Saegusa, Shiragami combines the DNA of one of his roses with genetic material taken from his late daughter Erika and the mutant dinosaur Godzilla. The resulting monster, named Biollante, escapes from the laboratory and takes residence in Lake Ashino. For the duration of the creature's passivity, Saegusa sensed that it was in fact possessed by Erika's spirit. After Godzilla defeats Biollante for the first time, he heads toward a nuclear power plant, intent on absorbing its energy. Saegusa confronts Godzilla and nearly puts herself into a coma by bending Godzilla's will into leaving the area.

=== Godzilla vs. King Ghidorah (1991) ===
Saegusa returns in Godzilla vs. King Ghidorah (1991), where she joins a time traveling expedition to the Bikini Islands in 1944 in an attempt to alter history by preventing Godzilla's mutation. Miki identifies the Godzillasaurus residing on the island as Godzilla, thus allowing its capture and transportation away from the bomb sites.

=== Godzilla vs. Mothra (1992) ===
Saegusa is a less prominent character in Godzilla vs. Mothra (1992). She is seen working at the JSDF base and appears to show a moderate concern for Godzilla during his battle with the guardian monster Mothra and her dark twin Battra.

=== Godzilla vs. Mechagodzilla II (1993) ===
In Godzilla vs. Mechagodzilla II (1993), Miki is made a member of the newly created G-Force, the military arm of the UNGCC or United Nations Godzilla Countermeasures Center, a United Nations military alliance dedicated to the containing or destroying monsters such as Godzilla. There, she befriends Baby Godzilla and is appalled to learn that he will be used as bait to lure Godzilla. Despite her protests, Miki is assigned to use her powers to guide Super Mechagodzilla's long range weaponry onto Godzilla's second brain. To her shame, she succeeds in crippling Godzilla and begins crying for it. Godzilla is later revived by Fire Rodan and destroys the mecha. Miki then telepathically convinces Baby Godzilla to leave Japan with Godzilla.

=== Godzilla vs. SpaceGodzilla (1994) ===
In 1994's Godzilla vs. SpaceGodzilla, she receives a larger role than in previous films. By then she has come to develop a strong sense of empathy and respect towards Godzilla and began advocating methods of sequestering the kaiju that do not include killing him. Throughout the film she defends Godzilla from those who villainize him, while also wrestling with her feelings for a G-Force soldier she held an attraction to and for his enemy, Godzilla. The UNGCC now has its own department of psychic studies, which Miki is director of, and she is met by people who wish to telepathically control Godzilla; the plan is called Project-T. Though she personally believes that it cannot be done and is immoral, her mind is changed after the Cosmos tell her that SpaceGodzilla is coming and that Godzilla must be there to stop him. That, combined with how she sees UNGCC's plan for controlling Godzilla as the lesser of two evils compared with killing him, makes her agrees to Project-T. While on Godzilla's home, Birth Island, she meets a cheerful Little Godzilla, a grown up Baby, who recognizes her. When the adult Godzilla does arrive, she and her team succeed on placing a mind control device on Godzilla and she does manage to control him. That is interrupted when SpaceGodzilla arrives. Miki is later kidnapped by the Japanese Mafia, who had secretly bankrolled Project-T in the hopes of using Godzilla as a mercenary monster. She is later freed by her G-Force friends (which includes a scene of her using telekinesis to levitate the table she is strapped to and help one of her friends), the mobsters are killed by SpaceGodzilla, and she witnesses the last battle. After Godzilla's victory, she telekinetically removes the mind control device she had placed on his neck.

=== Godzilla vs. Destoroyah (1995) ===
She last appears in 1995's Godzilla vs. Destoroyah. Depicted as a fully integrated member of G-Force with a variety of acquired technical skills, she reveals her psychic abilities are waning. At the film's ending, with the rest of the G-Force team, she monitors the "death" of Godzilla Junior and nuclear meltdown death of Godzilla, which revives Junior, eventually mourning his death in the process.

=== Godzilla: Legends (2012) ===
Outside of the films, Miki appears in the 2012 comic book Godzilla: Legends by IDW. She is now shown running a school for psychic children and recruits a young American boy named Tristian as her newest student. She trains the children in hopes that they will be able to communicate with monsters like she had done in the past with Godzilla, but Tristian's powers accidentally summon Titanosaurus to attack the school.

== Appearances ==
=== Films ===
- Godzilla vs. Biollante (1989)
- Godzilla vs. King Ghidorah (1991)
- Godzilla vs. Mothra (1992)
- Godzilla vs. Mechagodzilla II (1993)
- Godzilla vs. SpaceGodzilla (1994)
- Godzilla vs. Destoroyah (1995)

=== Comics ===
- Godzilla: Legends
