= Godzilla vs. SpaceGodzilla =

1994 Japanese science fiction kaiju film directed by Kenshō Yamashita

- Theatrical release poster

Japanese name
- Katakana: ゴジラvsスペースゴジラ
Transcriptions
- Revised Hepburn: Gojira tai SupēsuGojira
- Directed by: Kensho Yamashita
- Written by: Hiroshi Kashiwabara
- Produced by: Tomoyuki Tanaka; Shōgo Tomiyama (Note: The film features no direct "producer" credit. Tanaka is credited as the executive producer while Tomiyama is credited for "cooperation" in producing it.)
- Starring: Megumi Odaka; Jun Hashizume; Zenkichi Yoneyama; Akira Emoto; Towako Yoshikawa
- Cinematography: Masahiro Kishimoto
- Music by: Takayuki Hattori
- Production company: Toho Pictures
- Distributed by: Toho
- Release date: December 10, 1994
- Running time: 107 minutes
- Country: Japan
- Language: Japanese
- Budget: ¥1 billion ($10 million)
- Box office: ¥1.65 billion (Japan rentals)

Godzilla vs. SpaceGodzilla (ゴジラvsスペースゴジラ, Gojira tai SupēsuGojira) is a 1994 Japanese kaiju film directed by Kensho Yamashita, with special effects by Kōichi Kawakita. Distributed by Toho and produced under their subsidiary Toho Pictures, it is the 21st film in the Godzilla franchise, as well as the sixth film in the franchise's Heisei series. The film is notable for the introduction of the monster SpaceGodzilla, as well as the re-introduction of the mecha character M.O.G.U.E.R.A.; its first appearance on-screen since the 1957 film The Mysterians.

Godzilla vs. SpaceGodzilla stars Megumi Odaka, Jun Hashizume, Zenkichi Yoneyama, Akira Emoto, and Towako Yoshikawa, with Kenpachiro Satsuma as Godzilla, Ryō Haritani as SpaceGodzilla, Wataru Fukuda as M.O.G.U.E.R.A. and Little Frankie as Little Godzilla. The film was released theatrically in Japan on December 10, 1994, and earned ¥1.65 billion in Japanese distributor rentals, it received mixed reviews from critics who praised the special effects and some battle scenes but criticized the storyline and pacing. Godzilla vs. SpaceGodzilla was released direct-to-video in the United States in 1999 by Columbia Tristar Home Video.

It was followed by Godzilla vs. Destoroyah, released on December 9, 1995.

== Plot ==
Godzilla's cells brought into space by Biollante in 1990, (Note: As depicted in Godzilla vs. Biollante (1989).) and Mothra in 1993, (Note: As depicted in Godzilla vs. Mothra (1992).) are exposed to intense radiation from a black hole, resulting in the birth of an extraterrestrial creature, which quickly makes its way to Earth, destroying a NASA space station along the way.

Meanwhile, members of the United Nations Godzilla Countermeasures Center (UNGCC), Koji Shinjo and Kiyoshi Sato, arrive at Baas Island, the home of Godzilla and his son Little Godzilla, in order to try enact Project T, the placement of a telepathic amplifier on Godzilla that can be used to mind control the beast and keep him away from Japan. The Cosmos, Mothra's twin priestesses, telepathically visit Miki Saegusa and warn her of the extraterrestrial's arrival. M.O.G.U.E.R.A (Mobile Operations G-Force Universal Expert Robot: Aero-type), a mecha built by the JSDF to replace Mechagodzilla as a part of Project M, (Note: After Godzilla defeated Mechagodzilla in Godzilla vs. Mechagodzilla II (1993).) is sent in to intercept the creature, but suffers damage in the process.

The creature lands on Baas Island and attacks Little. Godzilla intervenes but finds itself overwhelmed, and is powerless to stop the creature from trapping Little in a crystal prison. The creature, dubbed "SpaceGodzilla" by UNGCC, leaves for Japan, with Godzilla in pursuit.

Shortly thereafter, the yakuza, led by McKay, abduct Miki and bring her back to their base in Fukuoka in an attempt to use her psychic abilities to gain control over Godzilla. Miki is rescued by Shinjo, Sato and Akira Yuki, who is initially reluctant due to his hatred toward Godzilla, whom he blames for his best friend Goro Gondo's death in Osaka, before SpaceGodzilla arrives. SpaceGodzilla lands in central Fukuoka and forms a massive fortress of celestial crystals. M.O.G.U.E.R.A, now piloted by Shinjo, Sato and Yuki, arrives to once again battle SpaceGodzilla, but is still no match for it. Godzilla arrives in Kagoshima Bay and battles SpaceGodzilla, but SpaceGodzilla easily gains the upper hand.

The JSDF discovers that SpaceGodzilla is using Fukuoka Tower as a power converter, using it to transform the Earth's core into an energy that SpaceGodzilla can absorb, slowly killing the planet. While Godzilla battles SpaceGodzilla, M.O.G.U.E.R.A. splits into two different mechas: the Star Falcon, a flying battleship piloted by Yuki, and the Land M.O.G.U.E.R.A., a tank with a large drill in front of it piloted by Shinjo and Sato. Both mechas damage the crystal fortress while Godzilla pushes over Fukuoka Tower, cutting off SpaceGodzilla's energy supply. M.O.G.U.E.R.A. quickly reforms and blasts off SpaceGodzilla's crystal-like shoulder formations, weakening it. SpaceGodzilla then critically damages M.O.G.U.E.R.A. but is subsequently incinerated and destroyed by Godzilla's supercharged atomic breath. After SpaceGodzilla's destruction, the JSDF claims that if humanity continues to pollute space, another SpaceGodzilla may appear someday.

As Godzilla makes its way back to Baas Island, Miki uses her psychic powers to remove the mind control device from Godzilla's neck. Meanwhile at Baas Island, Little is freed from the crystal prison and begins blowing atomic bubbles.

== Cast ==
- Megumi Odaka as Miki Saegusa
- Jun Hashizume as Lieutenant Koji Shinjo
- Zenkichi Yoneyama as Lieutenant Kiyoshi Sato
- Akira Emoto as Major Akira Yuki
- Towako Yoshikawa as Professor Chinatsu Gondo, sister of late Goro Gondo.
- Yôsuke Saitô as Dr. Susumu Okubo
- Kenji Sahara as Minister Takayuki Segawa
- Akira Nakao as Commander Takaaki Aso
- Koichi Ueda as General Iyao Hyodo
- Sayako Osawa and Keiko Imamura as the Cosmos
- Ronald Hoerr as Professor Alexander Mammilov / voice of NASA announcer
- Tom Durran as McKay, the yakuza boss
- Kenpachiro Satsuma as Godzilla
- Little Frankie as Little Godzilla, Godzilla's son. Little previously portrayed as Baby Godzilla by Hurricane Ryu from the previous film.
- Ryō Haritani as SpaceGodzilla, the extraterrestrial creature created from Godzilla's cells and the film's main antagonist.
- Wataru Fukuda as M.O.G.U.E.R.A (Mobile Operations G-Force Universal Expert Robot: Aero-type), a mecha created by JSDF. Fukuda previously portrayed Mechagodzilla from the previous film.

== Production ==
Early concept art of SpaceGodzilla

Although director Kensho Yamashita and screenwriter Hiroshi Kashiwabara had more experience in producing teen idol movies, they were not newcomers to the kaiju genre, having both assumed minor roles in the making of Terror of Mechagodzilla. The two decided early in production to make the film more lighthearted than its predecessors and more focused on character development, centering it on Megumi Odaka's recurring character Miki Saegusa, who had previously played marginal roles in the series. The emphasis on lightheartedness was such that a scene depicting Godzilla desperately trying to rescue his son from SpaceGodzilla's crystal prison was deleted on account of its seriousness, a move disapproved of by Godzilla suit actor Kenpachiro Satsuma.

The idea of a "Space Godzilla" was first conceived in 1978, and was designed as a homage to the monster's hinted progenitor Biollante by incorporating tusks and a hissing roar reminiscent of the latter monster. Creature designer Shinji Nishikawa had initially envisioned SpaceGodzilla as a much more western dragon-like creature with large fin-like wings on the back. The final design bore greater resemblance to Godzilla's final form from the video game Super Godzilla, itself also designed by Nishikawa. Effects artist Koichi Kawakita redesigned Godzilla's son as a more cartoonish-looking character, having disliked the more dinosaurian-looking version in Godzilla vs. Mechagodzilla II. It was rumoured that Kawakita intended to use the new design in a children's spinoff TV special entitled Little Godzilla's Underground Adventure. However, this was nothing more than a myth. The M.O.G.U.E.R.A. suit was worn by Mechagodzilla performer Wataru Fukuda, and consisted of three pieces applied separately. The new Godzilla suit used for the majority of the film combined aspects of the suits used in Godzilla vs. Biollante/Godzilla vs. King Ghidorah and Godzilla vs. Mechagodzilla II, having a stocky, triangular build, wide shoulders and much less pronounced ribbing on the neck. The face bore similarities to those used in the previous two films, though the eyes were increased in size and given more prominent whites, thus making it relatively less menacing looking than its predecessors. Innovations included the head's ability to fully rotate around the body, and the incorporation of an air duct which solved the chronic ventilation problems present in previous suits. The suit from Godzilla vs. Mechagodzilla II was reused for Godzilla's entrance and exit from Baas Island and during the scene where he is telekinetically tossed by SpaceGodzilla.

=== Filming ===
The scenes taking place on Baas Island were filmed on Okinoerabu-Shima Island. The actors were unable to return to Japan to film scenes in the studio after a storm suspended air traffic, so they needed to return via ferry so that the filming schedule would not be delayed.

=== Music ===
Composer Akira Ifukube refused to be involved in the film after reading the script, which reminded him too much of a teen idol film and included rap music. The film's theme song, "Echoes of Love", was made by Fukuoka-based indietronica pop band Date of birth.

=== Nudity ===
Godzilla vs. SpaceGodzilla is the second film to feature brief nudity (following Terror of Mechagodzilla). This occurs when the character Akira Yuki (portrayed by Akira Emoto) is taking a shower on Baas Island in the evening and his buttocks are briefly seen.

== Release ==
=== English version ===
After the film was released in Japan, Toho commissioned a Hong Kong company to dub the film into English. In this international version of the movie, an English title card was superimposed over the Japanese title, as had been done with the previous 1990s Godzilla films.

Columbia TriStar Home Entertainment released Godzilla vs. SpaceGodzilla and Godzilla vs. Destoroyah on home video on January 19, 1999. This was the first time either film had been officially released in the United States. TriStar used the Toho dubs, but cut the end credits and created new titles and opening credits for both films. Toho's complete international version of Godzilla vs. SpaceGodzilla (sans any onscreen text besides the English title) has been broadcast on several premium movie channels since the early 2000s, as well as the 2014 Blu-Ray release.

== Reception ==
=== Box office ===
Released on December 10, 1994, the film sold 3.4 million tickets in Japan and earned ¥1,650,000,000 in Japanese distributor rentals. As the film's release coincided with the Kobe earthquake, Toho feared that the event would put off audiences due to the film's main battle sequence taking place in the same area, and thus sought to remedy this by lowering ticket prices.

=== Critical response ===
The film received mixed reviews. Monster Zero called the film "a curiously uninvolving effort" that "disappoints in nearly all aspects of the production". American Kaiju criticized the "wildly uneven pacing", "uneven special effects", and "exceedingly lumpy story", but added that "most of the special effects are pretty fair" and "the monster battles are mostly fun." DVD Cult said, "It does have some great destruction scenes and monster battles; two things that make these films worthwhile to begin with. The monster SpaceGodzilla is excellently designed, and is certainly far more menacing than anything Dean Devlin and Roland Emmerich ever dreamed up." Toho Kingdom said the film is "far from terrible" and "an underrated movie" but felt it suffered from an "overly complicated story", "underdeveloped characters", and "forgettable" music.

On Rotten Tomatoes the film has an approval rating of 57% based on 7 reviews, with a rating average of 4.3/10."

== Home media ==
Sony - Blu-ray (Toho Godzilla Collection)

- Released: May 6, 2014
- Picture: AVC-1080P
- Sound: Japanese and English (5.1 DTS)
- Subtitles: English (Dubtitles) and French
- Extras: Teasers and Theatrical Trailers (7 minutes) [1080i 30fps]
- Notes: This is a 2-Disc double feature with Godzilla vs. Mechagodzilla II.

DVD

Columbia/Tristar Home Entertainment

- Released: February 1, 2000
- Aspect Ratio: Widescreen (1.85:1) Anamorphic [NTSC]
- Sound: English (2.0)
- Region 1
- Note: A double feature with Godzilla vs. Destoroyah. On the U.S. DVD release, the final scene in which Godzilla is in the water while "Echoes of Love" plays is cut; however, it is left in the TV, on demand, and Japanese DVD versions.

Universe Laser

- Released: November 24, 2006
- Aspect Ratio: Widescreen
- Sound: (Japanese, Cantonese) Dolby Digital Stereo
- Subtitles English, Chinese (Traditional/Simplified)
- Region 3

== Other media ==
A manga adaptation was produced shortly before the film's release, it was written by Kanji Kashiwabara and illustrated by Takayuki Sakai, published by Shogakukan's Ladybug Comics line. SpaceGodzilla appeared in the Magic the Gathering set Ikoria: Lair of Behemoths as an alternate card version, which had its subtitle changed from 'Space Corona' to 'Void Invader' mid-release in response to the COVID-19 pandemic.
