= Powder Snow =

Powder Snow may refer to:

- Powder snow, a ski resort classification for loose, freshly-fallen snow
- Powder Snow (album) by Japanese idol and singer Megumi Odaka
