= Yasuko Sawaguchi =

Japanese actress (born 1965)

- Born: June 11, 1965 (age 61); Sakai, Osaka, Japan
- Occupation: Actress
- Years active: 1984–present

Yasuko Sawaguchi (沢口 靖子, Sawaguchi Yasuko; born June 11, 1965) is a Japanese actress.

== Early life ==
Sawaguchi was born in Sakai, Osaka on June 11, 1965. In early 1984, the Japanese movie studio Toho Company Ltd. held their first "Toho Cinderella Audition", and Yasuko, almost 19 at the time, was chosen as the first Toho Cinderella, beating out the other 30,000 contestants.

== Career ==
Shortly after, she made her film debut in the film Karate Cop III: Song of the Sea, before co-starring as the heroine Naoko Okumura in The Return of Godzilla, which was the grand comeback film for the famous movie monster Godzilla. She appeared in the next Godzilla film 5 years later, 1989's Godzilla vs. Biollante, but as another character (Erika Shiragami, who later becomes Godzilla's titular adversary). At the Toho Cinderella beauty contest that same year, she took place with the 2nd Toho Cinderella, 1987 winner Megumi Odaka (who was also in Biollante, starting her Miki Saegusa character).

She has since appeared in numerous movies and television (her TV show debut was Miotsukushi in 1985), and is considered one of Japan's most beautiful and talented actresses. She has played scientific criminal investigator Mariko Sakaki, the lead role in the television show Kasōken no Onna (and its successor Shin Kasōken no Onna), which have aired on TV Asahi since 1999. In NHK Taiga dramas she has portrayed Iroha-hime in the Dokuganryū Masamune (1987), Akahashi Tōko in Taiheiki (1991), and Nene in Hideyoshi (1996). She starred as Rui in the jidaigeki Shin On'yado Kawasemi (TV Asahi, 1997). She has also played the villain in one episode of Furuhata Ninzaburo in 1996.

She also voiced Chihiro's mother in the original Japanese version of Spirited Away. This involved her sounding as though she was talking with her mouth full, so she initially tried biting her finger while acting. When this didn't create the desired effect, some KFC chicken was ordered into the recording studio.

== Filmography ==
=== Television ===
Year	Title	Role	Notes	Ref.
1985	Miotsukushi	Kaoru	Lead role; Asadora	
1987	Dokuganryū Masamune	Irohahime	Taiga drama	
1989	Sayonara Ri Kōran	Ri Kōran (Yoshiko Yamaguchi)	Lead role; miniseries	
1991	Taiheiki	Akahashi Tōko (Tōshi)	Taiga drama	
1996	Hideyoshi	One	Taiga drama	
1996	Furuhata Ninzaburō	Yorie Usami	Episode 15	
1999–2024	The Woman of S.R.I.	Mariko Sakaki	Lead role; 24 seasons	
2004	Shinsengumi!	Okita Mitsu	Taiga drama	
2019	Crayon Shin-chan	Mariko Sakaki (voice)	Episode 1009	
2026	The Woman of S.R.I. the Final	Mariko Sakaki	Lead role; television film	

=== Film ===
Year	Title	Role	Notes	Ref.
1984	Karate Cop 3: Song of the Sea	Umiko Matsumura		
1984	The Return of Godzilla	Naoko Okumura		
1985	Four Sisters	Anne Kitazawa	Lead role	
1987	Film Actress	Seiko Kawashima		
1987	Princess from the Moon	Kaya	Lead role	
1989	Godzilla vs. Biollante	Erika Shiragami		
2001	Spirited Away	Yūko Ogino (voice)		
2021	The Woman of S.R.I. the Movie	Mariko Sakaki	Lead role	
2026	Samurai Vengeance	Ino Tae		

== Awards ==
Year	Award	Category	Work(s)	Result	Ref.
1986	10th Elan d'or Awards	Newcomer of the Year	Herself	Won	
1986	9th Japan Academy Film Prize	Newcomer of the Year	The Return of Godzilla	Won	
