= Toho Studios =

Japanese film studio

Toho Studios Co., Ltd.

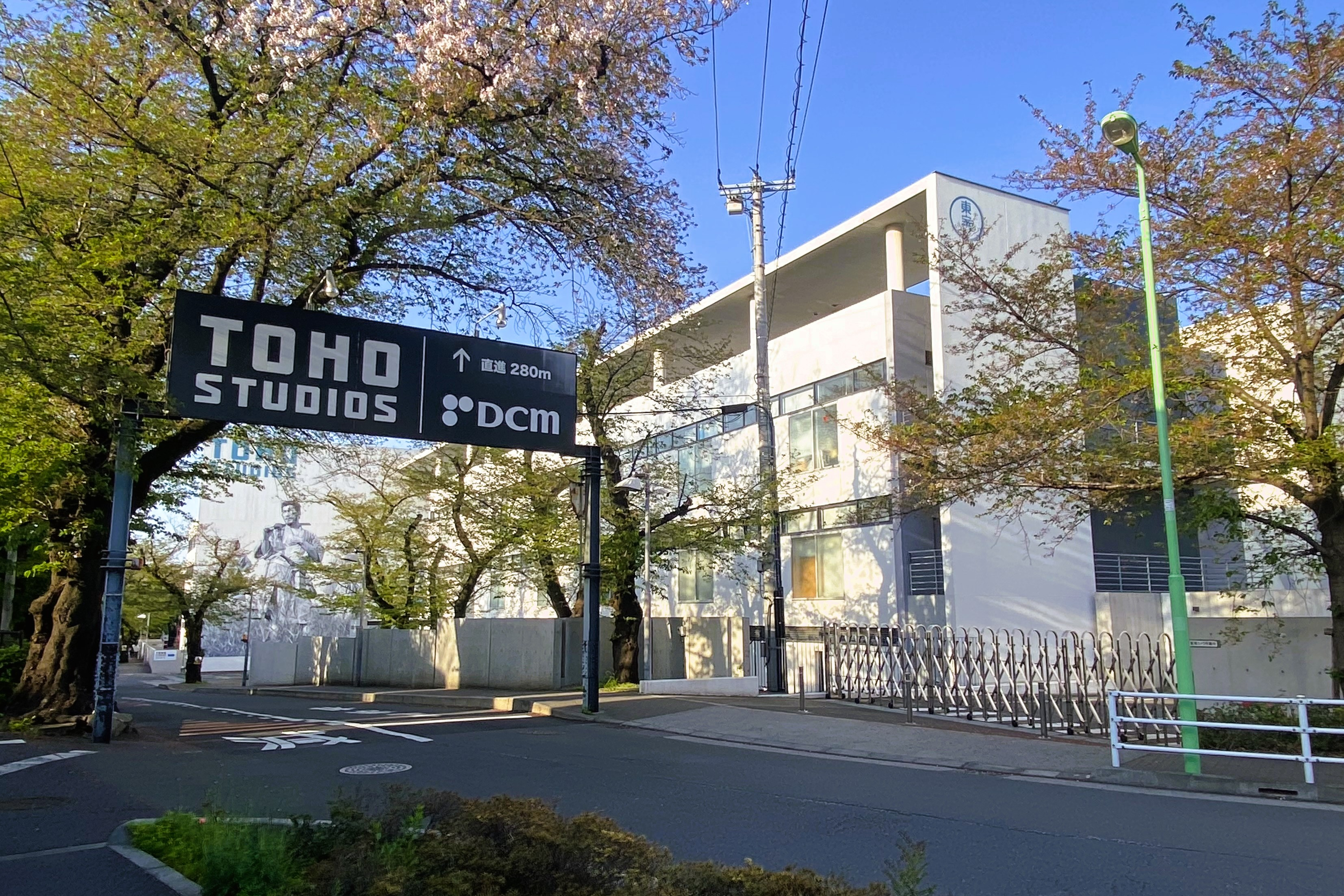
- Native name: TOHOスタジオ株式会社
- Romanized name: Tōhō Sutajio kabushiki gaisha
- Formerly: Toho Pictures, Inc. (1971-2020)
- Industry: Motion pictures
- Predecessor: Toho Studio Service
- Founded: November 8, 1971; 54 years ago
- Headquarters: Toho Studios, Seijo, Setagaya, Tokyo, Japan
- Key people: Mitsuru Shimada (president)
- Number of employees: 86
- Parent: Toho Co., Ltd.
- Website: www.tohostudio.jp

Toho Studios Co., Ltd. (Japanese: TOHOスタジオ株式会社, Hepburn: Tōhō Sutajio kabushiki gaisha) is a Japanese film studio and production company. A subsidiary of Toho Co., Ltd., it was founded in 1971 as Toho Pictures, Inc. (株式会社東宝映画, Kabushiki gaisha Tōhō Eiga). One of the most successful films produced by Toho Studios is the kaiju film Godzilla Minus One (2023), which generated more than $100 million at the global box office.

== History ==
Founded in November 8, 1971 as Toho Pictures, Inc. (株式会社東宝映画, Kabushiki gaisha Tōhō Eiga; lit. 'Toho Film Co., Ltd.'), the company originally served as a spin-off of Toho's original production department, and produced over 160 films. In December 2020, Toho Pictures merged with Toho Studio Service Co., Ltd. (株式会社東宝スタジオサービス, Kabushiki gaisha Tōhō Sutajio Sābisu), to create TOHO Studios, which is headquartered in Seijo, Setagaya, Tokyo.

== Works ==
=== Toho Pictures ===
- Here Comes Golden Bat (1972)
- Bye-Bye Jupiter (1984)
- The Return of Godzilla (1984)
- Godzilla vs. Biollante (1989)
- Godzilla vs. King Ghidorah (1991)
- Chōshōjo Reiko (1991)
- Godzilla vs. Mothra (1992)
- Godzilla vs. Mechagodzilla II (1993)
- Orochi, the Eight-Headed Dragon (1994)
- Godzilla vs. SpaceGodzilla (1994)
- Godzilla vs. Destoroyah (1995)
- Yatsuhaka-mura (1996)
- Rebirth of Mothra (1996)
- Rebirth of Mothra II (1997)
- Rebirth of Mothra III (1998)
- Godzilla 2000: Millennium (1999)
- Godzilla vs. Megaguirus (2000)
- Godzilla, Mothra and King Ghidorah: Giant Monsters All-Out Attack (2001)
- Godzilla Against Mechagodzilla (2002)
- Godzilla: Tokyo SOS (2003)
- Godzilla Final Wars (2004)
- Spring Snow (2005)
- As the Gods Will (2014)
- Attack on Titan (2015)
- Shin Godzilla (2016) [with Cine Bazar]
- Rage (2016)
- Murder at Shijinso (2019)
- Last Letter (2020)
- Love Me, Love Me Not (2020)

=== TOHO Studios ===
- Brave: Gunjō Senki (2021)
- Shin Ultraman (2022) [with Cine Bazar]
- Godzilla Minus One (2023) [with Robot Communications]
- Human Vapor (TV 2026) [with WOW POINT]
- Godzilla Minus Zero (2026) [with Robot Communications]
