= Wataru Fukuda =

Japanese suit actor

Wataru Fukuda (福田亘, Fukuda Wataru) (born April 7, 1964) is a Japanese suit actor.

== Partial filmography ==
- The Toxic Avenger Part II (1989)
- Crime Hunter: Bullets of Rage (1989)
- Godzilla vs. King Ghidorah (1991) as Godzillasaurus
- Godzilla vs. Mechagodzilla II (1993) as Mechagodzilla
- Yamato Takeru (1994) as Utuno Ikusa Gami
- Godzilla vs. SpaceGodzilla (1994) as M.O.G.U.E.R.A.
- Chouseishin Gransazer (2003/2004) as Sazer-Remls
- Genseishin Justirisers (2004/2005) as Riser Gant
- Chousei Kantai Sazer-X (2005/2006) as Captain Shark
