= Godzilla vs. Destoroyah =

1995 film by Takao Okawara

- Theatrical release poster

Japanese name
- Katakana: ゴジラＶＳデストロイア
Transcriptions
- Revised Hepburn: Gojira tai Desutoroia
- Directed by: Takao Okawara
- Written by: Kazuki Ōmori
- Produced by: Tomoyuki Tanaka; Shōgo Tomiyama
- Starring: Takuro Tatsumi; Yōko Ishino; Yasufumi Hayashi; Sayaka Osawa; Megumi Odaka; Masahiro Takashima; Momoko Kōchi; Akira Nakao; Shigeru Kamiyama; Saburo Shinoda
- Cinematography: Yoshinori Sekiguchi
- Edited by: Chizuko Osada
- Music by: Akira Ifukube
- Production company: Toho Pictures
- Distributed by: Toho
- Release date: December 9, 1995
- Running time: 103 minutes
- Country: Japan
- Language: Japanese
- Budget: ¥1 billion
- Box office: ¥3.5 billion ($34.5 million)

Godzilla vs. Destoroyah (Japanese: ゴジラＶＳデストロイア, Hepburn: Gojira tai Desutoroia) (Note: Also known as Godzilla vs. Destroyer) is a 1995 Japanese kaiju movie directed by Takao Okawara, with special effects by Kōichi Kawakita. Distributed by Toho and produced under their subsidiary Toho Pictures, it is the 22nd installment in the Godzilla franchise, and is the seventh and final film in the franchise's Heisei period. The film features the fictional monster characters Godzilla, Godzilla Junior and Destoroyah, and stars Takuro Tatsumi, Yōko Ishino, Yasufumi Hayashi, Sayaka Osawa, Megumi Odaka, Masahiro Takashima, Momoko Kōchi and Akira Nakao, with Kenpachiro Satsuma as Godzilla, Hurricane Ryu as Godzilla Junior, and Ryo Hariya as Destoroyah.

In the film, Godzilla's heart, which acts as a nuclear reactor, is nearing a nuclear meltdown which threatens the Earth. Meanwhile, a colony of mutated creatures known as Destoroyah emerge from the sea, changing form and terrorizing Japan, forcing the Japanese Self-Defense Forces to devise a plan to eliminate both threats.

Godzilla vs. Destoroyah received global publicity following an announcement by Toho that the film would feature the death of Godzilla. It was the final film starring actress Momoko Kōchi, produced by Tomoyuki Tanaka, and scored by composer Akira Ifukube before their deaths, though Ifukube's themes would continue to be used in subsequent films. The film was released theatrically in Japan on December 9, 1995 and received a direct-to-video release in the United States in 1999 by Columbia TriStar Home Video. It was the last Godzilla film to be produced by any studio until the 1998 film Godzilla, and was the last Godzilla film produced by Toho until the 1999 film Godzilla 2000.

== Plot ==
One year after the defeat of SpaceGodzilla by the hands of Godzilla and the JSDF's mecha M.O.G.U.E.R.A., (Note: As depicted in Godzilla vs. SpaceGodzilla (1994).) Miki Saegusa of the United Nations Godzilla Countermeasures Center (UNGCC) travels to Baas Island to monitor Godzilla and Little Godzilla, only to find the entire island destroyed and both monsters missing. Godzilla, now covered in lava-like rashes, subsequently appears in Hong Kong, destroying great swathes of the city with an empowered atomic breath. The JSDF hires college student Kenkichi Yamane, a grandson of Dr. Kyohei who had encountered the first Godzilla, (Note: As depicted in the 1954 self-titled film.) to unravel the mystery of Godzilla's condition. Yamane suspects that Godzilla's heart, which acts as a nuclear reactor, is undergoing a nuclear meltdown as a result of the monster absorbing the energy released from a uranium deposit on Baas Island by a volcanic eruption. Yamane theorizes that when Godzilla's temperature reaches 1,200 °C (2,190 °F), it will lead to a thermonuclear explosion with enough energy to destroy all life on Earth.

The JSDF deploys the Super X III, an aerial combat vehicle outfitted with ultra-low temperature lasers, in an attempt to reverse Godzilla's self-destruction. While Godzilla's meltdown is not stopped, it is halted long enough to render Godzilla temporarily unconscious. Meanwhile, a colony of Precambrian organisms mutated by the Oxygen Destroyer used to kill the first Godzilla are awoken during the construction of the Tokyo Bay Aqua Line. The organisms combine into human-sized crustacean-like monsters and engage the JSDF in several deadly skirmishes. The monsters, dubbed "Destoroyah", are revealed to be vulnerable to subzero temperatures and are temporarily held at bay with low-temperature lasers. The Destoroyah respond to the threat by merging into a larger creature, which destroys the lasers and takes to the skies in its flying form.

Godzilla awakens, its condition having deteriorated to the point that its meltdown could potentially destroy the Earth through a China syndrome-like incident. Miki locates the now grown-up Little Godzilla, redubbed "Godzilla Junior", and telepathically lures it to Tokyo, hoping that Godzilla will follow and be killed by Destoroyah. Junior arrives and battles Destoroyah, who absorbs Junior's DNA before being seemingly defeated. Godzilla arrives at Haneda Airport and reunites with Junior. Destoroyah, having mutated and grown larger, drops Junior onto the Ariake Coliseum, then blasts Junior with a Micro-Oxygen beam, fatally wounding it.

After driving off Destoroyah and unsuccessfully attempting to revive Junior, Godzilla's bereavement accelerates the rate of its meltdown. In the ensuing battle with Destoroyah, Godzilla's temperature reaches a critical state, allowing it to wound Destoroyah. As the injured Destoroyah tries to retreat, the JSDF fires their low-temperature lasers at its wings, causing it to plummet to its death onto the superheated ground.

As Godzilla goes into meltdown, the JSDF is able to minimize the damage with their low-temperature weapons. While they are successful in preventing Earth's destruction, Godzilla dies from its meltdown, which renders Tokyo uninhabitable. However, the radiation in Tokyo abruptly decreases to background levels, as Junior's lifeless body absorbs Godzilla's radiation, resurrecting and transforming it into a new Godzilla.

== Cast ==
- Takuro Tatsumi as Dr. Kensaku Ijuin
- Yasufumi Hayashi as Kenichi Yamane
- Yōko Ishino as Yukari Yamane
- Megumi Odaka as Miki Saegusa
- Sayaka Osawa as Meru Ozawa
- Saburō Shinoda as Professor Fukazawa
- Akira Nakao as Commander Takaki Aso
- Momoko Kōchi as Emiko Yamane
- Masahiro Takashima as Major Sho Kuroki
- Takehiro Murata as Soichiro Hayami, Yukari's Editor
- Shigeru Kamiyama as Goto
- Kenpachiro Satsuma as Godzilla
- Ryo Hariya as Destoroyah
- Hurricane Ryu as Godzilla Junior

== Production ==
Top: Concept art by Shinji Nishikawa for the scrapped concept of having Godzilla Junior possessed by the spirit of the original 1954 Godzilla
Bottom: Early "Barubaroi" concept art

After Godzilla vs. Mechagodzilla II and Godzilla vs. SpaceGodzilla failed to match the attendance figures of the highly successful Godzilla vs. Mothra, producer Shogo Tomiyama announced in the summer of 1995 that the next Godzilla movie would be the series' final installment. In conceptualizing Godzilla's final adversary, screenwriter Kazuki Ōmori initially proposed a story treatment entitled Godzilla vs. Ghost Godzilla, in which the current Heisei Godzilla would have faced off against the ghost of the original 1954 Godzilla. Instead, the filmmakers settled on a new monster that was a by-product of the Oxygen Destroyer, the weapon that killed the original Godzilla 40 years earlier.

The character was initially going to be named "Barubaroi", though this was rejected on account of it sounding too similar to the Berbers, and thus could have been considered offensive. The Barubaroi designs were more chimeric, similar to the creature designs from The Thing, than the finalized Destoroyah look, though they shared Destoroyah's trait of surpassing Godzilla in height. All of Destoroyah's forms were designed by Minoru Yoshida, who'd been instructed to make the creature a crustacean. His design for Destoroyah's final form was given to illustrator Noriyoshi Ohrai, who incorporated it into the movie poster. Ohrai's depiction was later used as the basis for the 3D model used in constructing the creature's suit.

In the original script, the final battle was to have taken place in the then still under construction World City, a development project costing $2.35 billion, though Tokyo governor Yukio Aoshima scrapped the project on account of its unpopularity with taxpayers.

Toho promoted the movie via large placards featuring the kanji text ゴジラ死す ("Godzilla dies"). Five days prior to the film's release, a large bronze statue of Godzilla was erected on the Hibiya cinema district. After the film's release, several mourners gathered at the statue to leave ¥10-100 coins and tobacco. One Japanese travel agency commemorated Godzilla's demise by hosting tours of various locations destroyed by Godzilla throughout the series. Toho representatives assured the public that Godzilla's death was not permanent, though they were not planning to revive him until the 21st century due to TriStar Pictures' plans to adapt the character in a film trilogy. However, after the first film was poorly received, Toho returned to the series in 1999 with the first film of the "Millennium Era", Godzilla 2000: Millennium.

=== Special effects ===
Effects artist Koichi Kawakita originally envisioned Godzilla being luminescent, and coated a Godzilla suit with luminescent paint and reflective tape, though this was deemed to look too unnatural. The final product was the result of placing 200 small orange light bulbs on the suit previously used for Godzilla vs. SpaceGodzilla and covering them with semitransparent vinyl plates. The resulting suit proved difficult for suit actor Kenpachiro Satsuma to perform in, as the cable powering the light bulbs added extra weight to the suit, and the carbonic acid gas emitted by the costume nearly suffocated him six times. For Godzilla's confrontation with the Super-X III, the now-expendable suit previously used for Godzilla vs. Mechagodzilla II was used, as it was predicted that it would have suffered irreparable damage from the liquid nitrogen used during the scene.

Godzilla Junior and Destoroyah were also portrayed via traditional suitmation techniques, though because the Junior suit was almost the same size as the main Godzilla one, a small animatronic prop was used in scenes where Junior interacts with his father for the purpose of proper scaling. During the scene where the JSDF bombards the immature Destoroyahs, the creatures were realized with Bandai action figures. Kawakita made greater use of CGI than in previous installments, having used it for the Super-X III's freezing of Godzilla, shots showing helicopters, computer schematics showing the outcome of Godzilla's meltdown, and Godzilla's death.

=== Music ===
Composer Akira Ifukube, who had previously declined to compose the score of Godzilla vs. SpaceGodzilla, agreed to work on Godzilla vs. Destoroyah's soundtrack since he "felt that since [he had] been involved in Godzilla's birth, it was fitting for [him] to be involved in his death." For Destoroyah's theme, Ifukube had initially wanted to give each of Destoroyah's forms their own motif, though he subsequently chose to give them all the same theme. He chose not to use the Oxygen Destroyer theme from the original 1954 film, as he felt that the theme expressed the tragedy of the weapon's creator, and thus was inappropriate for a monster. He also deliberately avoided using Godzilla's death theme from the original film, as he wanted to focus more on the dark side of humanity rather than on Godzilla itself. In describing his composition of Godzilla's death theme, he stated that it was one of the most difficult pieces he had ever composed, and that he approached it as if he were writing the theme to his own death. This film was the last to be scored by Ifukube that was released in his lifetime. His last score, composed for Tetsujin 28: Morning Moon of Midday, was released posthumously.

The Japanese heavy metal band Destroya derived its name from the character Destoroyah.

== Release ==
=== Box office ===
The film opened at number one at the Japanese box office and went on to sell approximately 4 million tickets in Japan for a gross of total of ¥3.5 billion ($34.5 million). It earned ¥2 billion in distribution income (around $18 million). It was the number one domestic film at the box office in Japan by distribution income for 1996 and fourth place overall behind Twister, Se7en and Mission: Impossible.

=== Critical response ===
On the review aggregator website Rotten Tomatoes, 100% of 6 critics' reviews are positive, with an average rating of 6.70/10. Rotten Tomatoes ranked the film number 6 out of all entries in the franchise.

Toho Kingdom said, "With an elegant style, a powerful plot, brilliant effects, and believable acting, this entry is definitely a notch above favorites from all three timelines, and its impact on the series is challenged by only a handful of competitors." Michael Hubert of Monster Zero praised the "spectacular monster battles", adding: "Even for non-Godzilla fans, this movie might help dispel some of the preconceptions you have about Godzilla's 'cheese factor'." Japan Hero called the film "a work of art" and "a must see for anyone who loves Godzilla" that features "something for everyone".

Stomp Kaiju gave the film a score of 4 out of 5, saying "This is one of the biggest productions the big G ever had. The new Super-X III, looking black and stealth-bombery, is a great addition, and the return of Lt. Sho Kuroki (Masashiro Takashima) from Godzilla vs Biollante as its pilot is a nice touch [...] It's nice to see a company handle its property, beloved by millions, with a little respect and knowledge of that property's history." Tim Brayton of Alternate Ending called it "A Godzilla movie of particular grandeur and seriousness", saying "it's the best Godzilla film of the VS era: visually robust, focused on great heaving gestures and emotions that work so much better in this franchise than the attempts at human-scaled storytelling that some of the more recent sequels gestured towards."

Mike Bogue of American Kaiju felt the film suffered from "several visual weaknesses" and a "disappointing editing", but that "the positive aspects of the visuals outweigh the negatives", and praised the film for "treating Godzilla with the same awe, majesty, and terror as [the original 1954 Godzilla]". A mixed review came from DVD Talk, saying that "Although it benefits from having an honest-to-goodness storyline with some continuity from the previous Godzillas (going back to the earliest films), Destoroyah's portentous pacing, cardboard-thin characters and cheeseball effects apparently served as a primer on what not to do when Hollywood picked up the franchise."

Complex listed the character as number 3 on its "The 15 Most Badass Kaiju Monsters of All Time" list. Journalist and film historian Steve Ryfle called Destoroyah a "nearly immobile Predator-meets-SpaceGodzilla clone", stating the character is "more laughable than menacing, and should be placed alongside Megalon and Gigan in the back rooms of the Toho monster gallery."

=== Home media ===
The film has been released on DVD by Columbia/Tristar Home Entertainment on February 1, 2000, along with Godzilla vs. SpaceGodzilla.

It was released on Blu-ray in The Toho Godzilla Collection by Sony on May 6, 2014, along with Godzilla vs. Megaguirus.

=== Awards ===
Year	Award	Category	Recipient	Result
1996	Japan Academy Awards	Special Award for Sound Effects	Godzilla vs. Destoroyah	Won
1996	Japan Academy Awards	Best Editing	Chizuko Osada	Nominated
1996	Japan Academy Awards	Best Sound	Kazuo Miyauchi	Nominated
2015	Saturn Award	Best DVD or Blu-ray Collection	Godzilla vs. Destoroyah (As part of the Toho Godzilla Collection)	Nominated

== Other media ==
Three video games based on the film were released by Sega in 1995: Godzilla: Kaijuu no Daishingeki (Game Gear), Godzilla: Heart-Pounding Monster Island (Pico), and Godzilla: Rettoushinkan (Saturn).
