= Soleiman Mehdizadeh =

Iranian martial artist

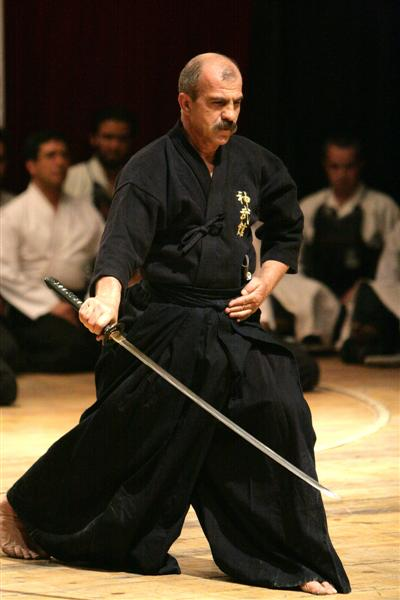
- Performing Iaido Kata, May 2008.
- Born: 1955 (age 70–71); Tehran, Iran
- Native name: سلیمان مهدیزاده
- Nationality: Iranian
- Style: Iaido, Kendo, Karate, Taekwondo, Aikido
- Rank: Kyoshi, 8th Dan
- Years active: 1976 – Present

Other information
- Occupation: Martial arts instructor
- Website: SHINBUKAN (神武館) Dojo

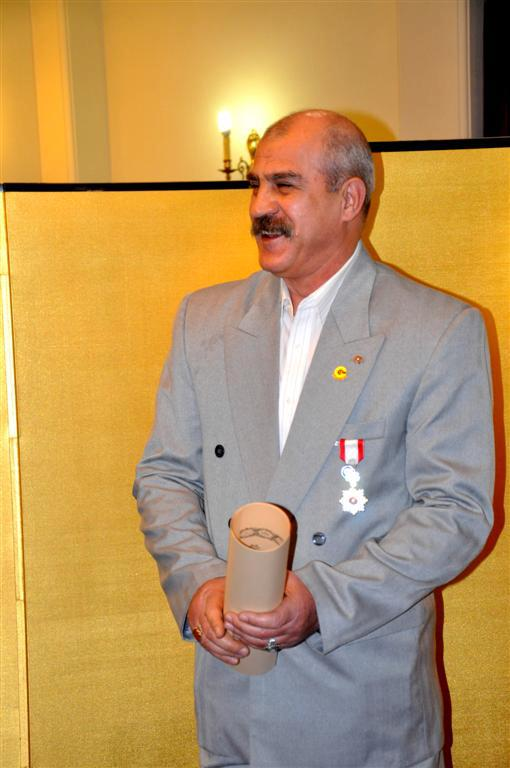
Conferment of Order of the Rising Sun. Embassy of Japan in Iran, 25 Dec 2012.

Soleiman Mehdizadeh (Japanese: ソレイマン・メヒディザデ, Persian: سلیمان مهدیزاده; born 1955) is an Iranian master of Budō.

== Biography ==
He traveled to Japan in 1977, to Tokyo, and started practicing Kendo. After a while, he returned to Iran; but, again, in 1978, he went to Japan and in Nishiyama's Dojo practiced Kendo. He also learned Iaido from Totsuka and Goju-ryu Karate under Yamamoto.

== Foundation history: Kendo & Iaido in Iran ==
Soleiman Mehdizadeh founded the teaching of the traditional martial art of Kendo-Iaido in Iran. In 1980, the International Martial Arts Federation started supervising Kendo & Iaido (Samurai). The formal training, which was under the control of Mehdizadeh, was in the Fencing Hall (Martial Arts Hall at the time). In the same year, the Japan Broadcasting Corporation (NHK) prepared a film about the first samurai martial arts training class in Iran and then broadcast it on Jan. 6th, 1983. Simultaneously Islamic Republic of Iran Broadcasting (IRIB) filmed a documentary showing martial arts exercises demonstrated by Mehdizadeh. Since Mehdizadeh had to stay in Japan for several months each year for follow-up technical and specialty exercises, his masters advised him to reside in Japan to pass higher-level exams in Kendo-Iaido. Returning to Iran in 1994, Mehdizadeh recommenced training of students under the supervision of the Karate Federation of the Islamic Republic of Iran.

== Honors and awards ==
- 1989: Title Of “KantoSho” (Fighting Spirit) in 19th Kendo Tournament, Tokyo / Japan.
- 1992: 1st title of Iaido Championship. (The first non Japanese person who has owned this title)
- 2002: 1st title of Iaido Championship. (For the second time)
- 2012: Order of the Rising Sun, Gold and Silver Rays.

== Ranks & Representations ==
- 8th Dan Kyoshi Iaido Muso Jikiden Eishin-ryu /Japan
- 8th Dan Kyoshi Okinawan Goju Ryu Karate /Japan
- 6th Dan Bujutsu /Japan
- 5th Dan International Kendo /Japan
- 2nd Dan Aikido Tomiki Ryu /Japan
- Official representative of International Kendo Federation in Iran and Middle east.
- Official representative of Okinawan GoJu Ryu Federation in Iran.
- The only instructor of Kendo from Japan's Kendo Federation (AJKF) & Kendo's International Federation (FIK) in Iran.
- Official representative of Aikido Tomiki Ryu Federation in Iran.

== On Media ==
- Featured on NHK; First Martial Art Samurai Dojo in Iran.
- Featured on IRIB TV3; Razm va Namaa (Iaido & Kendo).
- Featured on IRIB TV3; Razm va Namaa (Iaido & Kendo).
- Featured on IRINN; Honarhaye Razmi (Iaido & Kendo).
