= Megumi Odaka =

Japanese actress and singer (born 1972)

- Odaka in Godzilla vs. Destoroyah
- Born: May 9, 1972 (age 54); Yokohama, Kanagawa, Japan
- Occupations: Actress, singer
- Years active: 1984–2000, 2023
- Notable work: Heisei Godzilla Series
- Spouse: Akihiro Ugajin

Megumi Odaka (小高恵美, Odaka Megumi; born May 9, 1972, in Yokohama, Kanagawa, Japan) is a former Japanese idol, actress and singer. She is best known for the role of Miki Saegusa in six Godzilla films released from 1989 to 1995.

== Biography ==
Megumi Odaka was born on May 9, 1972, in Yokohama, Kanagawa, Japan. She graduated from Horikoshi High School. Odaka is the niece of actress Mayumi Shimizu. While in junior high school, Odaka suffered from a stomach illness and low blood pressure.

After winning the "Toho Cinderella Audition" (東宝「シンデレラ」オーディション, Tōhō Shinderera Ōdishon) in 1987, where she took place with 1984 winner Yasuko Sawaguchi, Odaka made her film debut as the blind girl Akeno in the film Princess from the Moon. The following year she won a Japanese Academy Award for "Rookie of the Year" for her performance in this film. In 1988, she starred in the TV series Hana no Asuka-gumi! as Asuka Kuraku along with Natsuki Ozawa and Hikari Ishida, based on a manga series about a 14-year-old delinquent girl.

=== Godzilla series ===
After playing roles in a number of TV series, Odaka landed the role of Miki Saegusa in Godzilla vs. Biollante in 1989 (although her character's back story was first introduced in the manga adaptation of 1984 reboot). Toho was impressed with her acting skills and she reprised her role in the following installment and the rest of the Heisei Series. Prior to assuming the role, Odaka had never seen a Godzilla film, and was initially scared of the Godzilla suit until she befriended suit performer Kenpachiro Satsuma.

Odaka was one of the few actors to play the same role in more than one original Japanese release of a Godzilla film, while her character has made the most appearances in the franchise to date (Takashi Shimura played Dr. Kyouhei Yamane in the first two films, Raymond Burr reprised his role as Steve Martin in the edited American releases Godzilla, King of the Monsters! and Godzilla 1985, Yumiko Shaku starred as Akane Yashiro in Godzilla Against Mechagodzilla and returned briefly for its sequel Godzilla: Tokyo S.O.S., and finally Momoko Kochi who portrayed Emiko Yamane on the original 1954 Godzilla film reprised her role in a cameo appearance in Godzilla vs. Destroyah).

=== Music career ===
Odaka also had a short singing career from 1988 to 1991, which spawned six singles and the two albums, Milky Cotton (1988) and Powder Snow (1989). She also acted in several stage productions such as "Anne no aijou" (or "Anne no ai") aka "Anne's Love" or "Anne's Affection" in 1991, "Kiki's Delivery Service" in 1995, "Peter Pan" in 1996 and "Yana no ue no Violin-jiki" ("Violin Player on top of the Roof" or "Fiddler on the Roof") in 1994, 1996, and 1998.

=== Retirement ===
In 2000, Odaka declined a role in a stage adaptation of Phoenix (Hi no Tori) at the Osaka Shochikuza due to her illnesses. She then left Toho and announced her retirement.

Odaka was not heard from until September 25, 2010, when she recorded a message for the Giant Monster Summit 12 (大怪獣サミット12, Dai-kaijū Samitto Jū-ni). Since her retirement, she took several jobs such as office work and cosmetics sales.

== Personal life ==
Odaka is married to actor and director Akihiro Ugajin (宇賀神明広, Ugajin Akihiro). Since 2012, Odaka has participated as an actress and assistant director in Ugajin's theater class U-Gakkyū (ウ学級).

== Filmography ==
=== Film ===
- Princess from the Moon (1987)
- Godzilla vs. Biollante (1989)
- Gogeza Monogatari (1991)
- Godzilla vs. King Ghidorah (1991)
- Godzilla vs. Mothra (1992)
- Godzilla vs. Mechagodzilla II (1993)
- Shoot! (1994)
- Godzilla vs. SpaceGodzilla (1994)
- Godzilla vs. Destoroyah (1995)
- Hoshi 35 (2023)

=== Web Content ===
- Godzilla vs. Gigan Rex (2022)

=== Television ===
- Hana no Asuka-gumi! (1988)
- Seishun Kazoku (1989)
- Hey! Agari Icchou (1989)
- Ikenai Joshikou Monogatari (1990)
- Gekai Arimori Saeko (1990) (Episode 5)
- Genji Monogatari ue no Makishita no kan (1990)
- Anata Dake Mienai (1992)
- Yonimo Kimyouna Monogatari – Haru no Tokubetsu-hen (1992)
- Ude ni Oboe ari 2 (1992) (Episode 5)
- Oushin Doctor Jiken no Karte (1992) (Episode 9)
- Kaseifu wa Mita! (1992) (Episode 11)
- Furuhata Ninzaburō (1996) (2nd Season – Episode 14)
- Samurai Tantei Jiken (1997) (Episode 14)
- Hakui no Futari (1998)
- Hamidashi Keiji Jounetsu kei (2000) (4th Series – Episode 17)

== Discography ==
=== Singles ===
- "Sōshun no Eki" (早春の駅) / "Dōshite desu ka" (どうしてですか) (March 21, 1988)
- "Blue Wind" / "Tsuna no Toki" (砂の時期（とき）) (July 6, 1988)
- "Autabi Anata o Suki ni Naru" (逢うたびあなたを好きになる) / "Koi ga Samui November" (恋が寒いNovember) (November 21, 1988)
- "Jōnetsu no Sasayaki" (情熱のささやき) / "Harukaze Memory" (春風MEMORY) (March 21, 1989)
- "Shumatsu no Cinderella-tachi" (週末のシンデレラたち, Shumatsu no Shinderera-tachi) / "Stance" (スタンス, Sutansu) (August 30, 1989)
- "Ima, Kaze no Naka de" (いま、風の中で) / "Umi o Futari jime" (海をふたりじめ) (February 21, 1991)

=== Albums ===
- Milky Cotton (September 7, 1988)
- Powder Snow (November 29, 1989)
- Odaka Megumi Best (aka: Emi Odaka Best) (August 21, 2002)

== Photobooks ==
- Whisper / Sasayaki (March 30, 1989) (ISBN 4-8470-2106-1)
- TRY (05.11.1989) (ISBN 4-7648-1624-5)
