= Godzilla vs. Mothra =

1992 Japanese kaiju film

- Theatrical release poster by Noriyoshi Ohrai

Japanese name
- Katakana: ゴジラvsモスラ
Transcriptions
- Revised Hepburn: Gojira tai Mosura
- Directed by: Takao Okawara
- Screenplay by: Kazuki Ōmori
- Produced by: Shogo Tomiyama
- Starring: Tetsuya Bessho; Satomi Kobayashi; Takehiro Murata; Megumi Odaka; Shiori Yonezawa; Makoto Otake; Akiji Kobayashi; Koichi Ueda; Shinya Owada; Keiko Imamura; Sayaka Osawa; Saburo Shinoda; Akira Takarada
- Cinematography: Masahiro Kishimoto
- Edited by: Miho Yoneda
- Music by: Akira Ifukube
- Production company: Toho Pictures
- Distributed by: Toho
- Release date: December 12, 1992 (Japan)
- Running time: 102 minutes
- Country: Japan
- Language: Japanese
- Budget: ¥1 billion ($8 million)
- Box office: ¥3.77 billion

Godzilla vs. Mothra (ゴジラvsモスラ, Gojira tai Mosura; also known as Godzilla and Mothra: The Battle for Earth) is a 1992 Japanese kaiju film directed by Takao Okawara, with special effects by Kōichi Kawakita. Distributed by Toho and produced under their subsidiary Toho Pictures, it is the 19th film in the Godzilla franchise, and is the fourth film in the franchise's Heisei era. The film features the fictional monster characters Godzilla, Mothra, and Battra, and stars Tetsuya Bessho, Satomi Kobayashi, Takehiro Murata, Megumi Odaka, Shiori Yonezawa, Makoto Otake, Akiji Kobayashi, Koichi Ueda, Shinya Owada, Keiko Imamura, Sayaka Osawa, Saburo Shinoda and Akira Takarada, with Kenpachiro Satsuma as Godzilla and Hurricane Ryu as the Battra larva. The plot follows Battra and Mothra's attempts to prevent Godzilla from rampaging Yokohama.

Originally conceived as a standalone Mothra film entitled Mothra vs. Bagan, the film is notable for its return to a more fantasy-based, family-oriented atmosphere, evocative of older Godzilla films. Although he did not return as director, screenwriter Ōmori continued his trend of incorporating Hollywood elements into his screenplay, in this case nods to the Indiana Jones franchise.

Godzilla vs. Mothra was released theatrically in Japan on December 12, 1992. The film received critical acclaim and became the highest-grossing Japanese film of 1993. Godzilla vs. Mothra was released direct-to-video in the United States in 1998 by Columbia Tristar Home Video under the title Godzilla and Mothra: The Battle for Earth. The film was the second highest-grossing film in Japan in 1993, with Jurassic Park being the highest-grossing.

The film was followed by Godzilla vs. Mechagodzilla II, which was released on December 11, 1993.

== Plot ==
Following the battle with Mecha-King Ghidorah in mid-1992, (Note: As depicted in Godzilla vs. King Ghidorah (1991).) a meteoroid crashes in the Izu–Ogasawara Trench and awakens Godzilla from hibernation.

Six months later, ex-archaeologist Takuya Fujito is detained after stealing an ancient artifact in Thailand. Later, Ryuzo Dobashi, a representative of the Japanese prime minister, offers to drop Takuya's charges in exchange for exploring Infant Island in Indonesia with his ex-wife, Masako Tezuka and Kenji Ando, the secretary of the rapacious Marutomo Company.

After arriving on Infant Island, the trio find a cave containing a depiction of two giant moths in battle. Further exploration leads them to a giant egg and a pair of diminutive humanoids called the Cosmos, who identify the egg as belonging to Mothra. The Cosmos tell of an ancient civilization that tried to control the Earth's climate 12,000 years ago, thus provoking the Earth into creating Battra, a male divine moth with a ferocious appearance that vaguely resembles Mothra. Battra destroyed the civilization and their weather-controlling device but then became uncontrollable, and started to harm the very planet that created him. Mothra was then sent by the Earth to fight Battra, who eventually sealed in the Arctic Ocean by the former.

The Cosmos explain how the meteoroid uncovered Mothra's egg, and may have awoken Battra, who is still embittered over humanity's interference in the Earth's natural orders. The Marutomo Company sends a freighter to Infant Island to pick up the egg, ostensibly to protect it. As they are sailing, Godzilla surfaces and heads toward the newly hatched Mothra larva. Battra soon appears in its larval form and joins the battle, allowing Mothra to retreat. The battle between Godzilla and Battra is eventually taken underwater, where the force of the battle causes a giant crack on the Philippine Sea Plate that swallows the two.

In Manila, Masako and Takuya later discover Ando's true intentions when he takes the Cosmos to Marutomo headquarters, where its president Takeshi Tomokane intends to use them for publicity purposes. Mothra enters Tokyo in an attempt to rescue the Cosmos, but the Japan Self-Defense Forces attack her. The wounded Mothra heads for the National Diet Building and starts constructing a cocoon around herself. Meanwhile, Godzilla surfaces from Mount Fuji, while Battra frees himself from the Earth's crust and continues towards Japan. Both Mothra and Battra metamorphose into their imago forms and converge at Yokohama Cosmo World where they begin to fight once more. Godzilla interrupts the battle and initially attacks Battra. Mothra then briefly incapacitates Godzilla and comes to Battra's aid before returning to battle with Godzilla. Battra then returns the favor coming to Mothra's defense.

Regrouping, Mothra and Battra decide to join forces against Godzilla, determining Godzilla to be the greater threat to the planet. Eventually, the two moths overwhelm and carry Godzilla over the ocean. Godzilla kills Battra by biting its throat and blasting the wound with atomic breath. An exhausted Mothra drops Godzilla and the lifeless Battra into the ocean and seals Battra's resting place below the surface by creating a mystical glyph with scales from her wings.

The next morning, the Cosmos explain that Battra had been waiting many years to destroy an even larger meteoroid that would threaten the Earth in 1999. Mothra had promised she would stop the future collision if Battra were to die, and she and the Cosmos leave Earth as the humans bid farewell.

== Cast ==
- Tetsuya Bessho as Takuya Fujito (藤戸 拓也, Fujito Takuya)
- Satomi Kobayashi as Masako Tezuka (手塚 雅子)
- Takehiro Murata as Kenji Ando (安東 健二, Ando Kenji)
- Keiko Imamura and Sayaka Osawa as the Cosmos (コスモス, Kosumosu)
- Saburō Shinoda as Professor Shigeki Fukazawa (深沢 重樹, Fukazawa Shigeki)
- Akiji Kobayashi as Ryuzo Dobashi (土橋 竜三, Dobashi Ryuzo)
- Megumi Odaka as Miki Saegusa (三枝 未希, Saegusa Miki)
- Akira Takarada as Joji Minamino (南野 丈二, Minamino Joji)
- Koichi Ueda as Minoru Omae
- Makoto Otake as Takeshi Tomokane
- Shiori Yonezawa as Midori Tezuka
- Susumu Kurobe as Fuyuki Takaoka
- Kenzo Hagiwara as Takeo Shimura
- Shin Tatsuma as Daisuke Hirata
- Kenpachiro Satsuma as Godzilla
- Hurricane Ryu as the Battra larva

== Production ==
=== Development ===
The idea of a film featuring a revamped Mothra dated back to a screenplay written in 1990 by Kazuki Omori entitled Mothra vs. Bagan, which revolved around a vengeful dragon called Bagan who sought to destroy humanity for its abuse of the Earth's resources, only to be defeated by Mothra, the goddess of peace. However, following the poor box office performance of Godzilla vs. Biollante, the project was ultimately scrapped by Toho, under the assumption that Mothra was a character born purely out of Japanese culture, and thus would have been difficult to market overseas unlike the more internationally recognized Godzilla.

After the success of Godzilla vs. King Ghidorah, producer Shōgo Tomiyama and Godzilla series creator Tomoyuki Tanaka proposed resurrecting King Ghidorah in a film entitled Ghidorah's Counterattack, but relented when polls demonstrated that Mothra was more popular with women, which makes up a larger percentage of Japan's population compared to men. Tomiyama replaced Ōmori with Takao Okawara as director, but maintained Ōmori as screenwriter. Hoping to maintain as much of Mothra vs. Bagan as possible, Ōmori reconceptualized Bagan as Badora, a dark twin to Mothra. The character was later renamed Battra (a portmanteau of "battle" and "Mothra"), as the first name was disharmonious in Japanese. Tomiyama had intended to feature Mothra star Frankie Sakai, but was unable to because of scheduling conflicts. The final battle between Godzilla, Mothra and Battra was originally meant to have a more elaborate conclusion; as in the final product, Godzilla would have been transported to sea, only to kill Battra and plunge into the ocean. However, the site of their fall would have been the submerged, Stonehenge-like ruins of the Cosmos civilization, which would have engulfed and trapped Godzilla with a forcefield activated by Mothra.

Ishirō Honda, director of the original 1954 Godzilla film and other entries in the series, visited the set shortly before dying. Director Tim Burton visited the set during the first day of special effects filming while he was in Japan promoting Batman Returns.

=== Post-production ===
Koichi Kawakita continued his theme of giving Godzilla's opponents the ability to metamorphose, and had initially intended to have Mothra killed off, only to be reborn as the cybernetic moth MechaMothra, though this was scrapped early in production, thus making Godzilla vs. Mothra the first post-1984 Godzilla movie to not feature a mecha contraption. The underwater scenes were filmed through an aquarium filled with fish set between the performers and the camera. Kawakita's team constructed a new Godzilla suit from previously used molds, though it was made slimmer than previous suits, the neck given more prominent ribbing, and the arrangement of the character's dorsal plates was changed so that the largest plate was placed on the middle of the back. The arms were more flexible at the biceps, and the face was given numerous cosmetic changes; the forehead was reduced and flattened, the teeth scaled down, and the eyes given a golden tint. The head was also electronically modified to allow more vertical mobility. Filming the Godzilla scenes was hampered when the suit previously used for Biollante and King Ghidorah, which was needed for some stunt-work, was stolen from Toho studios, only to be recovered at Lake Okutama in bad condition.

The remains of the suit were recycled for the first battle sequence. Godzilla's roar was reverted to the high-pitched shriek from pre-1984 Godzilla films, while Battra's sound effects were recycled from those of Rodan. In designing Battra, which the script described as a "black Mothra", artist Shinji Nishikawa sought to distance its design from Mothra's by making its adult form more similar to its larval one than is the case with Mothra, and combining Mothra's two eyes into one.

== Release ==
Godzilla vs. Mothra was released in Japan on December 12, 1992, where it was distributed by Toho. The film sold approximately 4,200,000 tickets in Japan, becoming the number one Japanese film on the domestic market in the period that included the year 1993. It earned ¥2.22 billion in distribution income, and grossed ¥3.77 billion in total.

The film was released in the United States as Godzilla and Mothra: The Battle for Earth on April 28, 1998, on home video by Columbia TriStar Home Video.

=== Critical response ===
Godzilla vs. Mothra received critical acclaim upon its Japanese release. Review aggregation website Rotten Tomatoes has a 78% approval rating from critics, based on 9 reviews with an average score of 5.7/10.

Ed Godziszewski of Monster Zero said, "Rushed into production but a few months after Godzilla vs. King Ghidorah, this film is unable to hide its hurried nature [but] effects-wise, the film makes up for the story's shortcomings and then some." Japan Hero said, "While this movie is not the best of the Heisei series, it is still a really interesting movie. The battles are cool, and Battra was an interesting idea. If you have never seen this movie, I highly recommend it."

Stomp Tokyo said the film is "one of the better Godzilla movies in that the scenes in which monsters do not appear actually make some sort of sense. And for once, they are acted with some gusto, so that we as viewers can actually come to like the characters on screen, or at least be entertained by them." Mike Bogue of American Kaiju said the film "[does] not live up to its potential", but added that "[its] colorful and elaborate spectacle eventually won [him] over" and "the main story thread dealing with the eventual reconciliation of the divorced couple adequately holds the human plot together."

=== Home media ===
Columbia TriStar Home Video released the film on DVD on November 3, 1998, bundled with Godzilla vs. King Ghidorah; this release only presented the English dubs and in Fullscreen. Sony Pictures Home Entertainment released the film on Blu-ray on May 6, 2014, bundled with Godzilla vs. King Ghidorah; both films were presented in Japanese and English and in Widescreen.

In 2024, the Japanese version of the film, among other Heisei titles, was acquired by The Criterion Collection and added to their streaming service The Criterion Channel.

=== Awards ===
Year	Award	Category	Recipient	Result
1993	Tokyo Sports Movie Awards	Best Leading Actor	Tetsuya Bessho	Won
1993	1993 Best Grossing Films Award	Golden Award and Money-Making Star Award	Godzilla and Mothra: The Battle for Earth	Won
1993	1993 Awards of The Japanese Academy	Newcomer of the Year	Keiko Imamura, Sayaka Osawa	Won
1993	1993 Awards of The Japanese Academy	Best Music Score	Akira Ifukube	Nominated
1993	1993 Awards of The Japanese Academy	Best Supporting Actor	Takehiro Murata	Nominated
