= Kenpachiro Satsuma =

Japanese actor (1947–2023)

- Satsuma in 1997
- Born: Yasuaki Maeda; 27 May 1947; Kagoshima Prefecture, Japan
- Died: 16 December 2023 (aged 76)
- Other names: Ryūma Kusaka (Note: 久坂 龍馬, Kusaka Ryūma); Kengo Nakayama (Note: 中山 剣吾, Nakayama Kengo) (former stage names)
- Occupations: Actor, stuntman
- Years active: 1967–2023
- Notable work: Godzilla
- Children: 1

Yasuaki Maeda (前田 靖昭, Maeda Yasuaki; 27 May 1947 – 16 December 2023), known professionally as Kenpachiro Satsuma (薩摩 剣八郎, Satsuma Kenpachirō), was a Japanese actor and stuntman. He is best known for portraying Godzilla in all seven of the Heisei films.

Born in Kagoshima Prefecture, Satsuma began his acting career in the 1960s with small roles in samurai films. In 1971 he was offered the role of the smog monster antagonist Hedorah in Godzilla vs. Hedorah, opposite Haruo Nakajima as Godzilla. He went on to play Gigan in two further Godzilla films. When Nakajima retired from the Godzilla role in 1972, substitutes were hired between 1973 and 1975 until Satsuma took over permanently in 1984. His portrayal took the character away from the humor of the character's portrayals over the past decades, returning to the more animalistic Godzilla persona of the original 1954 film.

While filming Godzilla movies, Satsuma would regularly pass out on the set due to lack of oxygen while wearing the poorly ventilated and heavy rubber suits. This was especially a problem during the production of Godzilla vs. Destoroyah, in which the steam effect on the suit (meant to represent Godzilla undergoing a nuclear meltdown) was achieved using pure carbon dioxide. He also authored books detailing his experiences working on Godzilla movies and Pulgasari (1985). Satsuma opposed CGI versions of Godzilla, and reportedly walked out of a screening of the 1998 American adaptation because he felt that it took the life out of the character. He stated that he actually preferred Pulgasari to the 1998 Godzilla film.

Satsuma's final role was in the 2023 film Den Ace Chaos. He died from pneumonia on 16 December 2023, at the age of 76.

== Filmography ==
Satsuma in the Godzilla suit filming Godzilla vs. Mothra in 1992

- Shinsengumi (1969)
- Machibuse (1970)
- The Militarists (1970)
- Return of Ultraman (TV 1971-1972) as MAT base guard
- Battle of Okinawa (1971)
- Godzilla vs. Hedorah (1971) as Hedorah
- Godzilla vs. Gigan (1972) as Gigan
- Thunder Mask (TV 1972) as Thunder Mask
- Godzilla vs. Megalon (1973) as Gigan
- Zone Fighter (1973) as Gigan
- Prophecies of Nostradamus (1974)
- G.I. Samurai (1979) as a vassal of the Koizumi clan
- The Return of Godzilla (1984) as Godzilla
- Pulgasari (1985) as Pulgasari
- Godzilla vs. Biollante (1989) as Godzilla
- Godzilla vs. King Ghidorah (1991) as Godzilla
- Godzilla vs. Mothra (1992) as Godzilla
- Godzilla vs. Mechagodzilla II (1993) as Godzilla
- Monster Planet Of Godzilla (1994) as Godzilla
- Orochi, the Eight-Headed Dragon (1994) as Yamata no Orochi
- Godzilla vs. SpaceGodzilla (1994) as Godzilla
- Godzilla vs. Destoroyah (1995) as Godzilla
- Jigoku: Japanese Hell (1999)
- Blind Beast vs. Dwarf (2001)
- Den Ace Chaos (2023) Final film role

== Bibliography ==
- Godzilla's View of North Korea (ゴジラが見た北朝鮮) (1988; republished in 1994)
- Inside Godzilla (ゴジラのなかみ) (1993)
- Godzilla Finally Dies Peacefully (ゴジラついに大往生) (1996)
- I'm an actor. I've Been Called a Chakugurumi Actor for 30 years (俺は俳優だ 着グルミ役者と呼ばれて30年) (2004)
