= Godzilla vs. Biollante =

1989 film by Kazuki Ōmori

- Theatrical release poster by Noriyoshi Ohrai

Japanese name
- Katakana: ゴジラvsビオランテ
Transcriptions
- Revised Hepburn: gojira vs biolante
- Directed by: Kazuki Ōmori
- Screenplay by: Kazuki Ōmori
- Story by: Shinichirō Kobayashi
- Produced by: Shōgo Tomiyama
- Starring: Kunihiko Mitamura; Yoshiko Tanaka; Masanobu Takashima; Megumi Odaka; Konaiji Toyota; Toru Minegishi; Yasuko Sawaguchi; Toshiyuki Nagashima; Yoshiko Kuga; Ryunosuke Kaneda; Kōji Takahashi
- Cinematography: Yūdai Katō
- Edited by: Michiko Ikeda
- Music by: Koichi Sugiyama
- Production company: Toho Pictures
- Distributed by: Toho
- Release date: December 16, 1989
- Running time: 104 minutes
- Country: Japan
- Languages: Japanese; English Portuguese
- Budget: ¥700 million ($10.7 million)
- Box office: ¥1.77 billion (Japan)

Godzilla vs. Biollante (ゴジラvsビオランテ, Gojira tai Biorante) (Note: Alternatively known as Godzilla vs. Violante.) is a 1989 Japanese kaiju film directed and written by Kazuki Ōmori, with special effects by Kōichi Kawakita. Distributed by Toho and produced under their subsidiary Toho Pictures, it is the 17th film in the Godzilla franchise, the second film in the franchise's Heisei period, and a sequel to 1984's The Return of Godzilla. The film stars Kunihiko Mitamura, Yoshiko Tanaka, Masanobu Takashima, Megumi Odaka, Toru Minegishi, Yasuko Sawaguchi, Toshiyuki Nagashima, Yoshiko Kuga, Ryunosuke Kaneda and Kōji Takahashi. This was Odaka's first appearance in the Godzilla franchise as Miki Saegusa, and would reprise the role in every film for the remainder of the Heisei series.

In the film, corporations struggle for control over samples of Godzilla's cells, while the monster himself battles Biollante, a monster born from a combination of Godzilla's cells, the cells of a plant, and the cells of a human. The idea originated from a public story-writing contest, and set a trend common to all Heisei era movies, in which Godzilla faces off against opponents capable of metamorphosing into new, progressively more powerful forms.

Godzilla vs. Biollante was released theatrically in Japan on December 16, 1989. It received generally positive reviews, with critics praising the storyline, visual effects, and Sugiyama's score, but was a disappointment at the Japanese box office due to competition with Back to the Future Part II. It received a direct-to-video release in the United States on November 25, 1992, through HBO Video.

It was followed by Godzilla vs. King Ghidorah, released on December 14, 1991.

== Plot ==
In the aftermath of Godzilla's attack on Tokyo and later imprisonment at Mount Mihara, (Note: As depicted in The Return of Godzilla (1984).) in 1985, (Note: Year given on the plaque of the Godzilla Memorial Lounge shown in the film.) Godzilla's cells are secretly delivered to the Saradia Institute of Technology and Science in Saradia, where they are to be merged with genetically modified plants in the hope of transforming Saradian deserts into fertile land and ending the country's economic dependence on oil wells. Dr. Genshiro Shiragami and his daughter, Erika, are enlisted to aid with the project, but a terrorist bombing destroys the institute's laboratory, ruining the cells and killing Erika.

Five years later, in 1990, Shiragami has returned to Japan and merged some of Erika's cells with those of a rose in an attempt to preserve her soul. Meanwhile, scientist Kazuhito Kirishima and Lieutenant Goro Gondo of the JSDF are using the Godzilla cells they collected to create "Anti-Nuclear Energy Bacteria" (ANEB), hoping it can serve as a weapon against Godzilla should he return. They attempt to recruit Shiragami to aid them, but are rebuffed.

International tensions increase over the Godzilla cells, as they are coveted by both the Saradia Institute of Technology and Science and the American rival Bio-Major organization. An eruption from Mount Mihara causes tremors across the area, including Shiragami's home, badly damaging the roses. Shiragami agrees to join the JSDF's effort and is given access to the Godzilla cells, which he secretly merges with one of the roses. A night later, Bio-Major and Saradian agents break into Shiragami's lab, but are attacked by a large plant-like monster, named "Biollante" by Shiragami, which later escapes to Lake Ashi.

Bio-Major agents plant explosives around Mount Mihara and blackmail the National Diet, warning the explosives will be detonated and thus free Godzilla if the cells are not handed over. Kirishima and Gondo attempt to trade, but Saradian agent SSS9 thwarts the attempt and escapes with the cells. The explosives are detonated, and Godzilla is released. Godzilla moves to the nearest power plant so as to replenish its supply of nuclear energy, but Biollante calls out to Godzilla, distracting it.

Godzilla arrives at the lake to engage Biollante in a vicious battle, and emerges as the victor. Godzilla then proceeds toward the power plant at Tsuruga, but psychic Miki Saegusa uses her powers to divert Godzilla toward Osaka instead. The city is quickly evacuated before Godzilla makes landfall. A team led by Gondo meet Godzilla at the central district and fire rockets infused with the ANEB into its body, but Gondo is killed in the process, leaving Godzilla unharmed.

Kirishima recovers the cells and returns them to the JSDF. Shiragami theorizes that if Godzilla's body temperature is increased, the ANEB should work against it. The JSDF erects microwave-emitting plates during an artificial thunderstorm, hitting Godzilla with lightning and heating up its body temperature during a battle near the shores of Wakasa Bay. Godzilla is only moderately affected, but Biollante, having evolved into a more powerful form, arrives to engage Godzilla in battle once again.

After a long battle, Godzilla fires an atomic breath inside Biollante's mouth, mortally wounding Biollante. Godzilla is exhausted by the effects of the ANEB and faints. Biollante escapes by splitting apart into glowing spores, rising into space. As the spores ascend, they form an image of Erika. As Shiragami watches the scene, he is shot by SSS9. Kirishima chases and briefly fights with SSS9, with the agent being killed when Sho Kuroki activates a microwave plate he was standing on. Afterwards, Godzilla reawakens and returns to the ocean to recover.

== Cast ==
- Kunihiko Mitamura as Kazuhito Kirishima (桐島 一人, Kirishima Kazuhito)
- Yoshiko Tanaka as Asuka Okochi (大河内 明日香, Okochi Asuka)
- Masanobu Takashima as Major Sho Kuroki (黒木 翔, Kuroki Shō)
- Megumi Odaka as Miki Saegusa (三枝 未希, Saegusa Miki)
- Kōji Takahashi as Dr. Genichiro Shiragami (白神 源壱郎, Shiragami Gen'ichirō)
- Toru Minegishi as Col. Goro Gondo (権藤 吾郎, Gondō Gorō)
- Toshiyuki Nagashima as Dir. Seiichi Yamamoto (山本 精一, Yamamoto Seiichi)
- Ryunosuke Kaneda as Makoto Okochi (大河内 誠, Okōchi Makoto)
- Manjot Bedi as SSS9, Saradian agent
- Yoshiko Kuga as Chief Cabinet Secretary Keiko Owada
- Yasuko Sawaguchi as Erika Shiragami, daughter of Genichiro
- Kazuma Matsubara as Super X II coordinator
- Hirohisa Nakata as Defense Minister Minoru Koyama
- Koichi Ueda as General Hyodo
- Kōsuke Toyohara as Super X II controller
- Takashi Hunt as John Lee, Bio-Major spy
- Derrick Homes as Michael Low, Bio-Major spy
- Demon Kogure as himself
- Abdallah Helal as Saradian scientist
- Aydin Yamanlar as Saradian plant director
- Soleiman Mehdizadeh as Sirhan
- Haruko Sagara as TV reporter
- Yuki Saito as Pop Singer
- Beth Blatt as Susan Horne
- Kazue Ikura as Airport PA
- Kenpachiro Satsuma as Godzilla
- Masashi Takegumi as Biollante

== Production ==
=== Pre-production ===
The original idea was to find something that could match Godzilla's power and terror if we were bringing back Godzilla. But simply letting the monsters fight each other had been done many times and, clearly, there was a limit to it. So in order to bring back Godzilla properly we had to create an opponent that can fight properly. If there was something equivalent to the terror of nuclear power it must be the bio-technology [with] which human beings would manipulate life, because it can be very dangerous if it goes the wrong way, ethically, I guess. That's where I found the connection, so the idea of a monster [that] was created by biotechnology was born.

— Shinichiro Kobayashi

Tomoyuki Tanaka announced a sequel to The Return of Godzilla in 1985, but was skeptical of its possibilities, as the film had been of little financial benefit to Toho, and the failure of King Kong Lives following year convinced him that audiences were not ready for a continuation of the Godzilla series. He relented after the success of Little Shop of Horrors, and proceeded to hold a public story-writing contest for a possible script. In consideration of The Return of Godzilla's marginal success in Japan, Tanaka insisted that the story focus on a classic monster vs. monster theme. Tanaka handed the five finalist entries to director Kazuki Ōmori, despite the two's initially hostile relationship; the latter had previously held Tanaka responsible for the decline in the Godzilla series' quality during the 1970s. Ōmori chose the entry of dentist Shinichiro Kobayashi, who wrote his story with the hypothetical death of his daughter in mind.

Kobayashi's submission was notable for its emphasis on dilemmas concerning biotechnology rather than nuclear energy, and revolved around a scientist grieving for his deceased daughter and attempting to keep her soul alive by merging her genes with those of a plant. The scientist's initial experiments would have resulted in the creation of a giant rat-like amphibian called Deutalios, which would have landed in Tokyo Bay and been killed by Godzilla. A female reporter investigating the scientist's activities would have suffered from psychic visions of plants with humanoid faces compelling her to infiltrate the scientist's laboratory. The scientist would have later confessed his intentions, and the finale would have had Godzilla battling a human-faced Biollante who defeats him by searing his flesh with acid. Creature designer Shinji Nishikawa originally designed Biollante's head as much more flowerlike, with four petal-like jaws, though the film's producers insisted on a more reptilian head.

Ōmori proceeded to modify the story into a workable script over a period of three years, using his background as a biologist to create a plausible plot involving genetic engineering and botany. In order to preserve the series' anti-nuclear message, he linked the creation of Biollante to the use of Godzilla cells, and replaced Kobayashi's journalist character with Miki Saegusa. He openly admitted that directing a Godzilla film was secondary to his desire to make a James Bond movie, and thus added elements of the spy film genre into the plot. Unlike the case with later, more committee-driven Godzilla films, Ōmori was given considerable leeway in writing and directing the film, which Toho staff later judged to have been an error resulting in a movie with a very narrow audience.

=== Special effects ===
Preparation of the Biollante model for the final battle scene. The model required 32 wires to operate.

Koichi Kawakita, who had previously worked for Tsuburaya Productions, replaced Teruyoshi Nakano as head of the series' special effects unit after Toho became impressed at his work in Gunhed. Kawakita made use of Gunhed's special effects team Studio OX, and initially wanted to make Godzilla more animal-like, using crocodiles as references, but was berated by Tanaka, who declared Godzilla to be "a monster" rather than an animal. Kenpachiro Satsuma returned to portray Godzilla, hoping to improve his performance by making it less anthropomorphic than in previous films. Suitmaker Noboyuki Yasamaru created a Godzilla suit made specifically with Satsuma's measurements in mind, unlike the previous one which was initially built for another performer and caused Satsuma discomfort. The resulting 242 lb suit proved more comfortable than the last, having a lower center of gravity and more mobile legs. A second 176 lb suit was built for outdoor underwater scenes. The head's size was reduced, and the whites around the eyes removed. On the advice of story finalist Shinichiro Kobayashi, a double row of teeth was incorporated in the jaws. As with the previous film, animatronic models were used for close-up shots. These models were an improvement over the last, as they were made from the same molds used for the main costume, and included an articulated tongue and intricate eye motion. The suit's dorsal plates were filled with light bulbs for scenes in which Godzilla uses his atomic ray, thus lessening reliance on optical animation, though they electrocuted Satsuma the first time they were activated. Satsuma was also obliged to wear protective goggles when in the suit during scenes in which Godzilla battles the JSDF, as real explosives were used on set. The film was mainly shot at the Toho lot, although some filming occued on location at the East Fuji Maneuver Area.

Designing and building the Biollante props proved problematic, as traditional suitmation techniques made realizing the requested design of the creature's first form difficult, and the resulting cumbersome model for Biollante's final form was met with disbelief from the special effects team. Biollante's first form was performed by Masao Takegami, who sat within the model's trunk area on a platform just above water level. While the creature's head movements were simple to operate, its vines were controlled by an intricate array of overhead wires which proved difficult for Satsuma to react to during combat scenes as they offered no tension, thus warranting Satsuma to feign receiving blows from them, despite not being able to perceive them. Biollante's final form was even more difficult to operate, as its vine network took hours to rig up on set. Visibility in both the Godzilla and final form Biollante suits was poor, thus causing difficulties for Takegami in aiming the creature's head when firing sap, which permanently stained anything it landed on.

While it was initially decided to incorporate stop motion animation into the film, the resulting sequences were scrapped, as Kawakita felt they failed to blend in with the live-action footage effectively. The film however became the first of its kind to use CGI, though its usage was limited to scenes involving computer generated schematics. The original cut of the movie had the first battle culminating in Biollante's spores falling around the hills surrounding Lake Ashino and blooming into fields of flowers, though this was removed as the flowers were out of scale.

=== Music ===
Unlike the previous film, Godzilla vs. Biollante incorporates themes from Akira Ifukube's original Godzilla theme, though the majority of the soundtrack was composed of original themes by Koichi Sugiyama. The score was orchestrated by conductor David Howell through the Kansai Philharmonic, though Howell himself had never viewed the movie, and thus was left to interpret what the scenes would consist of when conducting the orchestra.

== English version ==
After the film was released in Japan, Toho commissioned a Hong Kong company named Omni Productions to dub the film into English.

In early 1990, Toho entered discussions with Miramax to distribute the film. When talks broke off, Toho filed a lawsuit in Los Angeles Federal Court, accusing Miramax of entering an oral agreement in June to pay Toho $500,000 to distribute the film. This lawsuit delayed the film's release for two years. An out of court settlement was reached with Miramax buying the rights to the film for an unreported figure. Miramax would have entertained thoughts of releasing the film in theaters, but in the end it was decided to release the film straight to home video instead. HBO Video released the film on VHS in 1992 and LaserDisc in 1993. Miramax utilized the uncut English international version of the film for this release (though The Criterion Collection did not utilize the uncut English international version of the film).

== Release ==
=== Home media ===
Godzilla vs. Biollante was released on VHS by HBO Video on November 25, 1992. It was later relicensed by Miramax and released on Blu-ray and DVD by Echo Bridge Home Entertainment on December 4, 2012. It was released as a double feature and 8-disc movie pack on both Blu-ray and DVD with Mega Shark Versus Giant Octopus (2009) by Echo Bridge Home Entertainment in 2013. It was last released by Lionsgate on Blu-ray and DVD on October 7, 2014. On the latter two releases, the film is rated PG by the Motion Picture Association for "traditional Godzilla violence".

In 2021, Toho premiered a 4K remaster of the film on the Nippon Classic Movie Channel, along with seven other Godzilla films also remastered in 4K. The film was downscaled to 2K for broadcast.

In 2024, the Japanese version of the film, among other Heisei titles, was acquired by The Criterion Collection and added to their streaming service The Criterion Channel, as well as HBO Max. Criterion released the film on 4K UHD Blu-ray and Blu-ray on March 18, 2025.

== Reception ==
=== Box office ===
In Japan, the film sold approximately 2 million tickets, earning ¥1.04 billion in distributor rentals and ¥1.77 billion in gross receipts.

=== Critical response ===
Godzilla vs. Biollante has received positive reviews, with praise for the story, music and visuals. Ed Godziszewski of Monster Zero said the film is "by no means a classic" but felt that "for the first time in well over 20 years, a [Godzilla] script is presented with some fresh, original ideas and themes." Joseph Savitski of Beyond Hollywood said the film's music is "a major detraction", but added that it's "not only one of the most imaginative films in the series, but also the most enjoyable to watch." Japan Hero said, "[T]his is definitely a Godzilla movie not to be missed."

In their scholarly book on kaiju cinema, Japan's Green Monsters, Rhoads and McCorkle offer an ecocritical assessment of Godzilla vs. Biollante. The scholars focus on the film's critique of genetic engineering and biotechnology years before the subject appeared in more popular Hollywood blockbusters like Steven Spielberg's 1993 blockbuster Jurassic Park. Rhoads and McCorkle counter prior reviews of the film and argue that Godzilla vs. Biollante possesses far deeper environmental messages than the obvious ones present on the film's surface.

In July 2014, in a poll reported by the Nihon Eiga Satellite Broadcasting Corporation, Godzilla vs. Biollante was selected as the best Godzilla film by a group of fans and judges.

Composer Akira Ifukube, who had refused to compose the film's score, stated on interview that he disliked the way Koichi Sugiyama had modernized his Godzilla theme, and defined the Saradia theme as "ridiculous", on account of it sounding more European than Middle Eastern.

On Rotten Tomatoes, approval rating of 75% based on 12 reviews, with a rating average of 6.0/10."

=== Awards ===
Year	Award	Category	Recipient(s)	Result
1990	44th Mainichi Film Concours	Best Actress	Yoshiko Tanaka (shared with Black Rain)	Won
1991	14th Japan Academy Prize	Newcomer of the Year	Masanobu Takashima	Won
