= The Return of Godzilla =

1984 film by Kōji Hashimoto

- Theatrical release poster

Japanese name
- Katakana: ゴジラ
Transcriptions
- Revised Hepburn: Gojira
- Directed by: Koji Hashimoto
- Screenplay by: Shuichi Nagahara
- Story by: Tomoyuki Tanaka
- Produced by: Tomoyuki Tanaka
- Starring: Ken Tanaka; Yasuko Sawaguchi; Yosuke Natsuki; Keiju Kobayashi; Kenpachiro Satsuma
- Cinematography: Katsumi Hara
- Edited by: Yoshitami Kuroiwa
- Music by: Reijiro Koroku
- Production company: Toho Pictures
- Distributed by: Toho
- Release date: December 15, 1984
- Running time: 103 minutes
- Country: Japan
- Languages: Japanese; Russian; English
- Budget: $6.25 million
- Box office: $14 million

The Return of Godzilla (ゴジラ, Gojira; Released in Japan as Godzilla), (Note: Also known as Godzilla 1984.) is a 1984 Japanese kaiju film directed by Koji Hashimoto, with special effects by Teruyoshi Nakano. Distributed by Toho and produced under their subsidiary Toho Pictures, it is the 16th film in the Godzilla franchise. While it was the last film produced during Japan's Shōwa era, it is officially recognized as the first entry in the franchise's Heisei series. The film serves as both a sequel to the original 1954 film and a reboot of the franchise that ignores the events that followed the first film. The Return of Godzilla stars Ken Tanaka, Yasuko Sawaguchi, Yosuke Natsuki, and Keiju Kobayashi, with Kenpachiro Satsuma as Godzilla.

After the commercial underperformance of Terror of Mechagodzilla (1975), Toho placed the franchise on hiatus. Producer Tomoyuki Tanaka, the character's creator, was determined to revive the series with a more serious tone that returned closer to the spirit of the original 1954 film. He conceived the story for what would become The Return of Godzilla. Progress began in 1977 but languished for years in development hell, delayed in part by American studios unsuccessfully pitching their own Godzilla projects. The film went through multiple working titles and several screenwriters before Shuichi Nagahara wrote the final screenplay in early 1984. Ishiro Honda, director of the original Godzilla, was initially expected to return but declined the offer. The project was instead assigned to Hashimoto, who had just made his directorial debut with the science fiction film Bye Bye Jupiter (1984). Principal photography ran from July to September 1984, with special effects photography continuing into October. It was the second Japanese film ever to use computer-generated imagery for visual effects, after Bye-Bye Jupiter.

The film was released theatrically in Japan on December 15, 1984, to lukewarm or mixed reviews from critics. It was the second-highest-grossing Japanese film of 1985, earning ¥1.7 billion ($6.8 million) in distributor rentals against its $6.25 million budget. The following year, a heavily re-edited localized version, Godzilla 1985, was released in the United States by New World Pictures, changing the film's political leaning. It features new footage, with Raymond Burr reprising his inserted role from Godzilla, King of the Monsters! (1956), itself an American localization of Godzilla (1954).

The film was followed by Godzilla vs. Biollante, released on December 16, 1989.

== Plot ==
Three months after a volcanic eruption at Daikoku Island, the crew of the Japanese fishing vessel Yahata Maru witness a giant monster emerging from the mountain. A few days later, reporter Goro Maki finds the vessel intact, discovering that all the crew are dead except for Hiroshi Okumura, who saves him from a giant Shockirus sea louse. (Note: While unnamed in the film, the mutated sea louse is called ショッキラス (Shokkirasu) in official Japanese sources, and Shockirus has become the accepted Romanization of that name.)

In Tokyo, Okumura realizes that the monster he saw was Godzilla and Maki writes an article on the subject. Bowing to government pressure, Maki's editor withholds the article in order to prevent mass panic. Maki visits Professor Hayashida, whose parents were lost in the monster's attack on Tokyo. (Note: Referring to the events of Godzilla (1954).) Hayashida describes Godzilla as a living, invincible nuclear weapon able to cause mass destruction. At Hayashida's laboratory, Maki meets Okumura's sister, Naoko, and informs her that her brother is alive and at the police hospital.

A Soviet submarine is destroyed in the Pacific, with the Kremlin blaming the Americans for the attack. Nuclear war between the two superpowers is averted when the Japanese reveal that Godzilla was behind the incident. The Japanese cabinet meets to discuss national defense and unveils the Super X, a specially-armored flying fortress armed with cadmium shells capable of counteracting the radiation fuelling Godzilla's body.

The Japanese military is put on high alert, but Godzilla evades detection and attacks the Mihama nuclear power plant in Shizuoka Prefecture. While feeding off the reactor, he is distracted by a flock of birds and leaves the facility. Hayashida believes that Godzilla was attracted by a homing signal from the birds and proposes using a similar frequency to lure Godzilla to Mount Mihara on Ōshima Island, where it could be trapped by triggering a volcanic eruption.

Prime Minister Mitamura meets with Soviet and American envoys and refuses to allow them to use nuclear weapons on Godzilla, even if the monster were to attack the Japanese mainland. The Soviets, fearful of Godzilla eventually reaching their Pacific Fleet bases in Vladivostok, send a disguised control ship into Tokyo Bay, intending to use it to launch a nuclear missile at Godzilla from one of their orbiting satellites should the monster attack Soviet territory.

Godzilla is sighted at dawn swimming towards Tokyo Bay, causing mass evacuations. The JASDF and the JSDF fail to halt Godzilla's advance towards Tokyo, and the ensuing battle damages the Soviet ship, triggering a missile launch countdown. The captain dies as he attempts to prevent the launch. Godzilla proceeds towards Shinjuku, where it is confronted by four laser-armed trucks and the Super X, which knocks Godzilla unconscious by firing cadmium shells into its mouth.

The countdown ends and the Soviet missile is launched, but an American counter-missile intercepts it. Hayashida and Okumura are extracted from Tokyo via helicopter and taken to Mt. Mihara to set up the homing device before the two missiles collide above Tokyo. The resulting airburst produces an electrical storm and an EMP, which revives Godzilla and temporarily disables the Super X.

Godzilla bears down on the Super X just as it manages to get airborne again. With its cadmium shells depleted, the Super X is forced to engage Godzilla with conventional weapons, which prove ineffective, and is ultimately destroyed after Godzilla pushes a skyscraper on top of it. Godzilla continues its rampage until Hayashida uses the homing device to distract it. Godzilla leaves Tokyo and follows the homing device to Mt. Mihara, where it is lured into the mouth of the volcano. Okumura activates detonators at the volcano, creating a controlled eruption that traps Godzilla inside.

== Cast ==
- Ken Tanaka as Goro Maki (牧 吾郎, Maki Goro)
- Keiju Kobayashi as Prime Minister Seiki Mitamura
- Yasuko Sawaguchi as Naoko Okumura (奥村 尚子, Okumura Naoko)
- Yosuke Natsuki as Professor Makoto Hayashida (林田 信, Hayashida Makoto)
- Shin Takuma as Hiroshi Okumura (奥村 宏, Okumura Hiroshi)
- Eitaro Ozawa as Minister of Finance Taizo Kanzaki (大蔵, Kanzaki Taizo)
- Hiroshi Koizumi as Professor Minami (南)
- Mizuho Suzuki as Minister of Foreign Affairs Seiichi Emori (江守 誠一, Emori Seiichi)
- Taketoshi Naito as Chief Cabinet Secretary Hirotaka Takegami (武上 弘隆, Takegami Hirotaka)
- Junkichi Orimoto as JSDF Chief of Staff Mōri (毛利)
- Kei Satō as Chief Editor Godo (伍堂)
- Nobuo Kaneko as Minister of Home Affairs Isomura (磯村)
- Takenori Endo as Desk Editor Kitagawa (喜多川)
- Yoshifumi Tajima as Minister of the Environment Hidaka (日高)
- Shinpei Hayashiya as Kamiya (神谷)
- Tetsuya Takeda as a vagrant
- Walter Nichols as US Special Envoy Rosenberg
- Aleksandr Kairis as Soviet Special Envoy Chevsky
- Luke Johnston as Soviet Air Force Colonel Kashirin
- Dennis Falt as Soviet Submarine Captain

Godzilla is portrayed by suit actor Kenpachiro Satsuma, in the first of eight appearances as the character. Extras in the Shinjuku crowd included franchise creators Akira Toriyama of Dragon Ball, Yuji Horii of Dragon Quest, and Akira Sakuma of Momotaro Dentetsu.

== Production ==
=== Early development ===
After the commercial failure of Terror of Mechagodzilla (1975), Toho placed the Godzilla franchise on hiatus and relied on re-releases of earlier films. Godzilla creator and longtime producer Tomoyuki Tanaka led efforts to revive the series. He wanted to return Godzilla to its serious, anti-nuclear origins, inspired by the Three Mile Island accident and the success of adult-oriented science fiction films such as King Kong (1976), Invasion of the Body Snatchers (1978), Alien (1979) and The Thing (1982).

The 1977 success of Star Wars sparked a science-fiction boom in Japan. Toho responded with The War in Space, helmed by eight-time Godzilla director Jun Fukuda and released December 1977. In parallel, Tanaka (under the pen name Hachiro Jinguji) commissioned an early screenplay titled Resurrection of Godzilla, completed on June 22, 1977, by Ryūzō Nakanishi and Akira Murao. The story featured Godzilla awakening at Bikini Atoll, revived by nuclear incidents, and rampaging through Japan. It included elements such as giant bloodsucking ticks and Godzilla seeking nuclear energy—ideas that would later appear in the finished film. Fukuda was initially considered as director, and the project appeared on Toho's early 1978 production lineup.

On February 4, 1978, Tanaka held a meeting with media and industry professionals to discuss the revival. In August 1979, the Associated Press reported that the film—now titled The Return of Godzilla—was planned for a 1980 release with Ishirō Honda (director of the 1954 original) at the helm. Tanaka described it as a return to the dark tone of the 1954 original. Later drafts included a version featuring Godzilla fighting the shape-shifting monster Bagan (also called Bakan), but most projects stalled, including a 1983 revised script by Murao and Hideichi Nagahara due to budget issues.

Multiple proposed drafts from Hollywood and other companies also emerged but did not materialize. Producer Henry G. Saperstein pursued Japan–U.S. co-productions such as Godzilla vs. Gargantua and Godzilla vs. the Devil. In 1983, American director Steve Miner developed Godzilla: King of the Monsters in 3D, but the project failed due to its high costs and technical demands. In a 1983 interview, Tanaka stated he would resolve any co-production talks before moving forward with a Japanese production. Reportedly Tanaka also decided to helm a Japanese film for "strictly domestic consumption" to be released jointly alongside Miner's movie.

Public nostalgia surged, and interest grew steadily during this period. In mid-1978, Asahi Sonorama published Fantastic Collection No. 5: Godzilla, sparking books, LPs, and videos. In August 1979, in celebration of Godzilla's 25th anniversary, Toho held a 21-day film festival in Tokyo featuring multiple kaiju films, including the Raymond Burr version. A grassroots Godzilla Revival Committee formed, publishing fanzines, organizing events, and collecting signatures (reportedly up to 40,000 or more demanding a new film). Tanaka met with fans across Japan, lecturing and promoting screenings. From 1981–1983, the committee helped run the Japan SFX Convention with guests like Honda and displays of props. In 1983, Toho organized a Godzilla film festival and participated in the "A Night of Special Effects Music" concert (August 5, 1983), premiering Akira Ifukube's Symphonic Fantasia, hosted by Tanaka with appearances by Ifukube, Honda, and Akihiko Hirata. Yuji Kaida's painting for which was used for a concert art poster for the film.

=== Revival ===
We went back to the theme of nuclear weapons, since that was the theme of the original film. Japan has now learned three times what a nuclear disaster is, but at that time Japan had already had two. The problem was Japanese society was gradually forgetting about these disasters. They were forgetting how painful it had been. Everyone in Japan knew how scary nuclear weapons were when the original movie was made, but it wasn't like that by the 1980s. So in those meetings, we decided to remind all those people out there who had forgotten.

— Teruyoshi Nakano

On December 26, 1983, Toho formed the Godzilla Revival Preparation Committee (G Committee), a company-wide effort led by senior executives with Tanaka as vice-chairman. Kōichi Kawakita noted urgency to attract a new generation before interest waned. Nagahara completed the first draft, titled Godzilla: The Resurrection, on February 17, 1984. The title became just Godzilla by the second draft. The third, and what was pressumed to be finalized screenplay, was finished on May 30. However, a fourth version was made shortly after filming began.

In an effort to disavow Godzilla's increasingly heroic and anthropomorphic depiction in previous films, Tanaka insisted on making a direct sequel to the original 1954 movie. Nagahara wrote a screenplay combining elements of Resurrection of Godzilla and Miner's still unproduced film, including an intensification of hostilities during the Cold War and a flying fortress which fires missiles into Godzilla's mouth. Honda ultimately declined an offer from Tanaka to direct, believing the character had become its own entity, and saying he was happy working with Akira Kurosawa instead. Koji Hashimoto was chosen to direct, having recently co-directed the special-effects-heavy Bye-Bye Jupiter as his debut feature.

Composer Akira Ifukube was offered to score the film but respectfully declined. At the time, it was rumored that Ifukube refused to participate in the film due to the changes made to Godzilla, stating, "I do not write music for 80-meter monsters". However, this quote was later clarified, by Ifukube's biographer Erik Homenick and Japanese Giants editor Ed Godziszewski, as a joke spread by fans which was later misinterpreted as fact. Ifukube declined to score the film due to his priorities, at the time, teaching composition at the Tokyo College of Music.

=== Filming and special effects ===
Construction of the hydraulic "Cybot" Godzilla

Filming began with the special effects on July 7, 1984 (Stage 8, Soviet submarine), followed by principal photography starting on July 9, 1984 (Stage 1, Prime Minister's office). The main unit wrapped September 27; effects on October 3.

The special effects were directed by Teruyoshi Nakano, who had directed the special effects of several previous Godzilla films. The decision was made by Tanaka to increase the apparent height of Godzilla from 50 to 80 metres (160 to 260 ft) so that Godzilla would not be dwarfed by the contemporary skyline of Tokyo. This meant that the miniatures had to be built to a 1/40th scale, and this contributed to an increase in the budget of the film to $6.25 million. Tanaka and Nakano supervised suit-maker Noboyuki Yasumaru in constructing a new Godzilla design, incorporating ears and four toes, features not seen since Godzilla Raids Again. Nakano insisted on infusing elements into the design that suggested sadness, such as downward-slanting eyes and sloping shoulders.

Suit construction took two months, and consisted of separately casting body-part molds with urethane on a pre-built, life-size statue of the final design. Yasumaru personally took charge of all phases of suit-building, unlike in previous productions wherein the different stages of suit-production were handled by different craftsmen. The final suit was constructed to accommodate stuntman Hiroshi Yamawaki, but he declined suddenly, and was replaced by veteran suit actor Kenpachiro Satsuma, who had portrayed Hedorah and Gigan in the Showa Era. Because the 110 kg (240 lb) suit wasn't built to his measurements, Satsuma had difficulty performing, being able to last only ten minutes within it, and losing 12 pounds during filming. Hoping to avoid having Godzilla move in an overly human fashion, Nakano instructed Satsuma to base his actions on Noh, a traditional Japanese dance.

Taking inspiration from the publicity surrounding the 40-foot tall King Kong model from Dino De Laurentiis's 1976 film of the same name, Toho spent a reported $420,000-475,000 on a 16-foot high robotic Godzilla (dubbed "Cybot") for use in close-up shots of the creature's head. The Cybot consisted of a hydraulically powered mechanical endoskeleton covered in urethane skin containing 3,000 computer operated parts which permitted it to tilt its head, and move its lips and arms. Unlike previous Godzilla suits, whose lower jaws consisted of wire-operated flaps, the Cybot's jaws were hinged like those of an actual animal, and slid back as they opened. A life-size, crane operated foot was also built for close-up shots of city destruction scenes. Part of the film was shot on location on Izu Ōshima, where the climax of the story takes place.

The film is also notable as the second Japanese film ever to use computer-generated imagery (CGI) for visual effects, the first being director Hashimoto's own debut Bye-Bye Jupiter (1984). These were created by Japan's first commercial CG studio, Japan Computer Graphics Lab (JCGL), with supervision by Yu Tsuchiya.

== Release ==
=== Theatrical ===
The Return of Godzilla was released on December 15, 1984, in Japan, where it was distributed by Toho. The film sold 3.2 million tickets in Japan, earning ¥1.7 billion ($6.8 million) in rentals at the Japanese box office. In December 1991, Associated Press stated that the film grossed a total of $14 million.

=== Home media ===
==== Japan ====
In 2023, Toho had announced 4K digital remasters for The Return of Godzilla and Godzilla vs. Megalon. The film was broadcast on the Japanese Movie Specialist Channel on October 12, 2023, at that time to commemorate the release of Godzilla Minus One. In 2026, Toho released the 4K remaster on 4K UHD Blu-ray and Remastered Blu-ray in a 70th anniversary box set that included other 4K restored Godzilla films.

==== United States ====
Kraken Releasing released the original Japanese version of The Return of Godzilla, as well as its international English dub, on DVD and Blu-ray in North America on September 13, 2016. However, the American version, Godzilla 1985, was not featured due to ongoing copyright issues concerning music cues that New World Pictures repurposed from Def-Con 4.

In 2024, the Japanese version of the film, among other Heisei titles, was acquired by The Criterion Collection and added to their streaming service The Criterion Channel, as well as HBO Max.

== Alternate English versions ==
=== Exported English dub ===
Shortly after the film's completion, Toho's foreign sales division, Toho International Co., Ltd, had the film dubbed into English by Matthew and Elizabeth Oram's company in Hong Kong. No cuts were made, though credits and other titles were accordingly rendered in English. The international English dub features the voice of news anchor and radio announcer John Culkin in the role of Goro Maki, and actor Barry Haigh as Prime Minister Mitamura. The English version fully dubs all dialogue into English, including that of the Soviet and American characters. The international English dub was released on VHS in the U.K. by Carlton Home Entertainment on July 24, 1998.

In 2016, the international English dub was included on the U.S. DVD and Blu-Ray releases from Kraken, though the audio mix was not the original monaural track that was originally heard on Toho's English language prints. The English dialogue was originally mixed with an alternate music and effects track that contained different music edits and sound effects from the Japanese theatrical version, most notably a distinct "cry" produced by Godzilla during the film's ending. The U.S. home video version instead uses the conventional music and effects track used for the regular Japanese version mixed in DTS 5.1 surround sound instead of mono.

=== Godzilla 1985 ===
After the film's disappointing performance in the Japanese box office and the ultimate cancellation of Steve Miner's Godzilla 3D project, Toho decided to distribute the film overseas in order to regain lost profits. New World Pictures acquired The Return of Godzilla for distribution in North America, and changed the title to Godzilla 1985, bringing back Raymond Burr in order to commemorate the 30th anniversary of Godzilla: King of the Monsters!.

Originally, New World reportedly planned to re-write the dialogue in order to turn the film into a tongue-in-cheek comedy starring Leslie Nielsen (à la What's Up, Tiger Lily?), but this plan was reportedly scrapped because Raymond Burr expressed displeasure at the idea, taking the idea of Godzilla as a nuclear metaphor seriously. The only dialogue left over from that script was "That's quite an urban renewal program they've got going on over there", said by Major McDonahue. All of Burr's scenes were filmed in one day to suit his schedule. He was paid US$50,000. The reverse shots, of the actors he was speaking to, were filmed the next day, and the American filming was completed in three days. One of the most controversial changes done on the film was having Soviet Colonel Kashirin deliberately launch the nuclear missile rather than die in attempting to prevent its launch. Director R. J. Kizer later attributed this to New World's management's conservative leanings.

The newly edited film also contained numerous product placements for Dr Pepper, which had twice used Godzilla in its commercials. Dr Pepper's marketing director at one point insisted that Raymond Burr drink Dr Pepper during a scene, and the suggestion was put to the actor by Kizer. Burr reportedly responded by "[fixing] me with one of those withering glares and just said nothing."

Roger Ebert and Vincent Canby gave the film negative reviews.

== See also ==
- Pulgasari, a film produced in North Korea in 1985 to capitalize on The Return of Godzilla's success; it also features special effects directed by Nakano and a titular monster portrayed by Satsuma.
- List of Japanese films of 1984
- List of science-fiction films of the 1980s
- List of monster movies
