= List of horror film villains =

Horror films often make use of villains as primary antagonists. Some such characters have become iconic in their own right due to their roles in film.

== Villains ==
Name	Film	Actor(s)	Description	Refs.
Anguirus	Godzilla Raids Again	Katsumi Tezuka; Hiroshi Sekita; Koetsu Omiya; Tadaaki Watanabe; Kin'ichi Kusumi	A dinosaur-like kaiju and enemy of Godzilla.	
Art the Clown	All Hallows' Eve; Terrifier franchise	Mike Giannelli; David Howard Thornton	A demonic evil clown.	
Ash	Alien	Ian Holm	An android science officer on the Nostromo.	
Baragon	Frankenstein vs. Baragon	Haruo Nakajima	A dinosaur-like kaiju and enemy of Frankenstein.	
Patrick Bateman	American Psycho	Christian Bale	A psychopathic and homicidal yuppie and investment banker.	
Norma Bates	Psycho franchise	Paul Jasmin	The abusive mother of Norman Bates.	
Norman Bates	Psycho franchise	Anthony Perkins; Kurt Paul; Vince Vaughn; Freddie Highmore	A man with dissociative identity disorder and a murderous alter that takes the form of his mother.	
Billy	Black Christmas franchise	Bob Clark; Albert J. Dunk; Nick Mancuso; Robert Mann; Cainan Wiebe	A mysterious murderer that taunts and kills a group of students during the Christmas season.	
Billy the Puppet	Saw franchise	Tobin Bell	A puppet used by Jigsaw.	
Biollante	Godzilla vs. Biollante	Masao Takegami	A plant-like hybrid kaiju and enemy of Godzilla.	
Black Phillip	The Witch	Charlie; Daniel Malik	A Puritan family's black he-goat which is actually the disguise assumed by the Devil.	
Seth Brundle	The Fly	Jeff Goldblum	A scientist that turns into a fly-human hybrid monster due to an accident.	
Max Cady	Cape Fear	Robert Mitchum; Robert De Niro; Javier Bardem	A criminal with an obsessive grudge against an attorney named Sam Bowden.	
Candyman	Candyman franchise	Tony Todd; Michael Hargrove; Cedric Mays; Yahya Abdul-Mateen II	The vengeful ghost of an African American man murdered for an interracial love affair.	
Billy Chapman	Silent Night, Deadly Night franchise	Robert Brian Wilson	A toy store employee that embarks on a murder spree on Christmas Eve.	
Chop Top	The Texas Chainsaw Massacre 2	Bill Moseley	A cannibalistic Vietnam veteran.	
Chucky	Child's Play franchise	Brad Dourif; David Kohlsmith; Tyler Barish; Fiona Dourif; Devon Sawa; Rosemary Dunsmore; Zackary Arthur; Mark Hamill	An evil possessed toy doll.	
Clayface	Clayface	Tom Rhys Harries	Matt Hagen was an up-and-coming actor whose life took a tragic turn after a vicious attack left him disfigured. In a desperate attempt to regain his former looks, he underwent an experimental procedure that instead transformed him into Clayface, a monstrous, shapeshifting supervillain.	
Clover	Cloverfield	—N/a	A giant infant kaiju.	
Daimajin	Daimajin	Chikara Hashimoto	A giant warrior god kaiju.	
Jerry Dandrige	Fright Night	Chris Sarandon; Colin Farrell	A murderous vampire.	
Death Angels	A Quiet Place franchise	—N/a	A blind alien species that hunts by sound.	
Francis Dolarhyde	Manhunter and Red Dragon	Tom Noonan; Ralph Fiennes; Richard Armitage	A serial killer that murders entire families every full moon.	
Count Dracula	Various	Various	An archetypal vampire inspired by Vlad the Impaler.	
Ebirah	Ebirah, Horror of the Deep	Hiroshi Sekida	A giant lobster kaiju.	
Frankenstein's monster	Universal Monsters franchise	Boris Karloff; Lon Chaney Jr.; Bela Lugosi; Glenn Strange	An undead monster created by the mad doctor Victor Frankenstein.	
Angela Franklin	Night of the Demons series	Amelia Kinkade; Shannon Elizabeth	A young woman possessed by a demon.	
Gamera	Gamera, the Giant Monster	Teruo Aragaki	A giant turtle-like alien kaiju.	
Ghostface	Scream franchise	Roger L Jackson (Voice); Skeet Ulrich; Matthew Lillard; Timothy Olyphant; Laurie Metcalf; Scott Foley; Rory Culkin; Emma Roberts; Tyga; Giorgia Whigham; Mikey Madison; Jack Quaid; Tony Revolori; Dermot Mulroney; Jack Champion; Liana Liberato; Kraig Dane; Ethan Embry; Anna Camp	An identity used by multiple killers.	
Gigan	Godzilla vs. Gigan	Kenpachiro Satsuma	A cyborg alien kaiju and enemy of Godzilla	
Godzilla	Godzilla franchise	Various	A giant dinosaur-like kaiju.	
Jame Gumb	The Silence of the Lambs	Ted Levine	A serial killer that murders women to wear their skin.	
Hedorah	Godzilla vs. Hedorah	Kenpachiro Satsuma	A kaiju made of sludge.	
Mark Hoffman	Saw franchise	Costas Mandylor	An apprentice and successor of Jigsaw.	
Igor	Universal Monsters franchise	Bela Lugosi	The laboratory assistant of Victor Frankenstein.	
Imhotep	The Mummy	Boris Karloff; Arnold Vosloo	An undead Egyptian mummy.	
Pennywise	It (miniseries); Woh; It (2017 film); It Chapter Two; It: Welcome to Derry	Tim Curry; Lilliput; Bill Skarsgård	A malevolent entity that takes the form of an evil clown.	
Kharis	The Mummy's Hand	Tom Tyler; Lon Chaney Jr.	An undead Egyptian mummy.	
King Ghidorah	Ghidorah, the Three-Headed Monster	Shoichi Hirose; Susumu Utsumi; Kanta Ina	A three-headed alien kaiju and enemy of Godzilla.	
King Kong	King Kong franchise	Shoichi Hirose; Haruo Nakajima; Rick Baker; Peter Elliott; Andy Serkis; Terry Notary; Toby Kebbell; Eric Petey; Allan Henry	A giant ape.	
John Kramer	Saw franchise	Tobin Bell	A serial killer that tortures victims in elaborate traps.	
Freddy Krueger	A Nightmare on Elm Street franchise	Robert Englund; Jackie Earle Haley	The evil spirit of a child killer that haunts nightmares.	
Leatherface	The Texas Chainsaw Massacre franchise	Gunnar Hansen; Bill Johnson; R. A. Mihailoff; Robert Jacks; Andrew Bryniarski; Dan Yeager; Sam Strike; Mark Burnham	A cannibal that wears the faces of his victims.	
Hannibal Lecter	Hannibal Lecter franchise	Anthony Hopkins; Brian Cox; Gaspard Ulliel; Mads Mikkelsen	A brilliant forensic psychologist and cannibalistic serial killer.	
Mechagodzilla	Godzilla vs. Mechagodzilla	Kazunari Mori	A robot version of Godzilla.	
Megaguirus	Godzilla vs. Megaguirus	Minoru Watanabe	A giant dragonfly-like kaiju and enemy of Godzilla.	
Megalon	Godzilla vs. Megalon	Hideto Odachi	A giant beetle-like kaiju and enemy of Godzilla.	
Mothra	Mothra	Haruo Nakajima; Katsumi Tezuka	A giant moth-like kaiju.	
MUTO	Monsterverse franchise	—N/a	A giant bug-like species of kaiju.	
Michael Myers	Halloween franchise	Nick Castle; Dick Warlock; George P. Wilbur; Don Shanks; Chris Durand; Brad Loree; Tyler Mane; James Jude Courtney	A mute murderer that kills people on Halloween night.	
Count Orlok	Nosferatu	Max Schreck; Klaus Kinski; Willem Dafoe; Doug Jones; Bill Skarsgård	A vampire based on Count Dracula.	
Rustin Parr	Blair Witch franchise	Frank Pastor	A serial killer that murdered seven children on instructions from the Blair Witch.	
Pearl	X series	Mia Goth	A psychopathic killer.	
Rhoda Penmark	The Bad Seed	Patty McCormack; Carrie Wells; Mckenna Grace	A child serial killer and psychopath.	
Pinhead	Hellraiser franchise	Doug Bradley; Stephan Smith Collins; Paul T. Taylor; Jamie Clayton	An extradimensional leader of the demonic Cenobites.	
David Powers	The Lost Boys	Kiefer Sutherland	The head of a gang of vampires.	
Predator	Predator franchise	Kevin Peter Hall; Ian Whyte; Brian Steele; Carey Jones; Derek Mears; Brian A. Prince; Dane DiLiegro	An alien species that trophy hunts other species for sport.	
Rodan	Rodan	Haruo Nakajima; Kōji Uruki; Masaki Shinohara; Teruo Aragaki	A giant pterosaur-like kaiju.	
Kayako Saeki	Ju-On franchise	Takako Fuji	The vengeful ghost of a woman killed by her husband.	
Toshio Saeki	Ju-On franchise	Daiki Sawada; Ryōta Koyama	The son of Kayako Saeki, a vengeful ghost.	
Slappy the Dummy	Goosebumps	Jack Black	An evil ventriloquy dummy.	
Slender Man	Always Watching: A Marble Hornets Story; Slender Man	Doug Jones; Javier Botet	A tall supernatural being with no face.	
Captain Spaulding	House of 1000 Corpses	Sid Haig	A vulgar and murderous clown.	
T-1000	Terminator franchise	Robert Patrick; Lee Byung-hun	A time-travelling robot assassin.	
Larry Talbot	The Wolf Man franchise	Lon Chaney Jr.	A werewolf.	
The Thing	The Thing from Another World; The Thing (1982); The Thing (2011)	James Arness; Jed; Peter Maloney; Charles Hallahan; David Clennon; Wilford Brimley; Paul Braunstein; Kim Bubbs; Trond Espen Seim; Kristofer Hivju; Joel Edgerton	A shapeshifting alien that mimics its prey.	
Damien Thorn	The Omen franchise	Harvey Spencer Stephens; Jonathan Scott-Taylor; Sam Neill; Seamus Davey-Fitzpatrick; Bradley James	The Antichrist.	
Sweeney Todd	Sweeney Todd (1928); Sweeney Todd: The Demon Barber of Fleet Street (1936); The Tale of Sweeney Todd (1997); Sweeney Todd: The Demon Barber of Fleet Street (2007)	Moore Marriott; Tod Slaughter; Ben Kingsley; Johnny Depp	A barber that kills his customers with a straight razor before giving their flesh to his partner Mrs. Lovett to bake into pies.	
Jack Torrance	The Shining; Doctor Sleep	Jack Nicholson; Henry Thomas	A writer that goes insane and tries to kill his wife and son.	
Tall Man	Phantasm franchise	Angus Scrimm	An extradimensional being posing as a mortician.	
Judge Turpin	Sweeney Todd: The Demon Barber of Fleet Street (2007)	Alan Rickman	A cruel and corrupt judge.	
Terminator	Terminator franchise	Arnold Schwarzenegger	A time-travelling robot assassin.	
Tiffany Valentine	Child's Play franchise	Jennifer Tilly	An evil possessed toy doll.	
Varan	Varan the Unbelievable	Haruo Nakajima; Katsumi Tezuka	A giant gliding dinosaur-like kaiju.	
Mason Verger	Hannibal	Gary Oldman	A wealthy, sadistic pedophile disfigured by Hannibal Lecter.	
Jason Voorhees	Friday the 13th franchise	Ari Lehman; Warrington Gillette; Steve Daskewisz; Richard Brooker; Ted White; Tom Morga; C. J. Graham; Kane Hodder; Ken Kirzinger; Derek Mears	An immortal, undead murderer.	
Pamela Voorhees	Friday the 13th franchise	Betsy Palmer	The murderous mother of Jason Voorhees.	
Harry Warden	My Bloody Valentine	Peter Cowper; Richard John Walters	A miner that kills people on Valentine's Day.	
Annie Wilkes	Misery	Kathy Bates	A nurse and serial killer.	
Xenomorph	Alien franchise	Bolaji Badejo; Tom Woodruff Jr.	An endoparasitoid species of alien.	
Sadako Yamamura	The Ring franchise	Rie Inō	The vengeful ghost of a young psychic that was murdered and thrown down a well.	
Yonggary	Yongary, Monster from the Deep	Cho Kyoung-min	A large dinosaur-like kaiju.	
Amanda Young	Saw franchise	Shawnee Smith	A victim and apprentice of Jigsaw.	
Zilla	Godzilla franchise	Kurt Carley	A large dinosaur-like kaiju.	

== See also ==
- List of comedy horror films
- List of natural horror films
- Lists of horror films
