= Keizō Murase =

Japanese film director (1935–2024)

- 村瀬継蔵
- Born: October 5, 1935; Ikeda, Tokachi, Hokkaido, Japan
- Died: October 14, 2024 (aged 89)
- Occupations: Suitmaker, stuntman, sculptor, modeler, film director
- Years active: 1958–2024

Keizō Murase (村瀬継蔵, Murase Keizō; October 5, 1935 – October 14, 2024) was a Japanese suitmaker, stuntman, sculptor, modeler, and film director. He is particularly well known for his work in giant monster films, including Mothra (1961), King Kong vs. Godzilla (1962), and The Mighty Peking Man (1977).

== Life and career ==
Murase was born in Ikeda, Tokachi, Hokkaido, Japan on October 5, 1935.

In 1958, Toho hired Murase to sculpt the Varan suit for Varan the Unbelievable. An amateur photographer, Murase extensively documented his work which was published in his 2015 autobiography, Monster Maker: Keizo Murase. After working for Daiei Film on Gamera, he, Masao Yagi, and Akira Suzuki founded the modelling company, Ex Productions, he later left in 1972 to form his own company, Twenty.

Murase died from cirrhosis of the liver on October 14, 2024, at the age of 89.

== Filmography ==
=== Film ===
- The H-Man (1958)
- Varan (1958) – Varan sculptor / Miniature construction
- Mothra (1961) – Mothra imago sculptor
- King Kong vs. Godzilla (1962) – King Kong and Godzilla sculptor
- Gorath (1962) – Maguma sculptor
- Matango (1963) – Matango sculptor
- Mothra vs. Godzilla (1964) – Godzilla sculptor
- Dogora (1964) – Dogora sculptor
- Ghidorah, the Three-Headed Monster (1964) – Godzilla and King Ghidorah sculptor
- Frankenstein Conquers the World (1965) – Frankenstein and Baragon sculptor
- Gamera (1965) – Gamera sculptor
- Return of Daimajin (1966) – Daimajin sculptor
- Daimajin Strikes Again (1966) – Daimajin sculptor
- Gamera vs. Gyaos (1967) – Gyaos sculptor
- Yongary, Monster from the Deep (1967) – Yonggary sculptor
- Gamera vs. Viras (1968) – Viras sculptor
- Terror of Mechagodzilla (1975)
- The Mighty Peking Man (1977) – Peking Man sculptor
- The Seventh Curse (1986)
- Godzilla vs. King Ghidorah (1991) – King Ghidorah and Mecha-King Ghidorah sculptor
- Godzilla vs. Mothra (1992)
- Howl from Beyond the Fog (2019)
- Brush of the God (2024) – Director

=== Television ===
- Kamen Rider (1971)
- Ultraman Ace (1972)
- Ike! Greenman (TV 1973–1974) – Greenman sculptor
