= Varan =

Fictional monster, or kaiju

- Varan the Unbelievable and Godzilla character
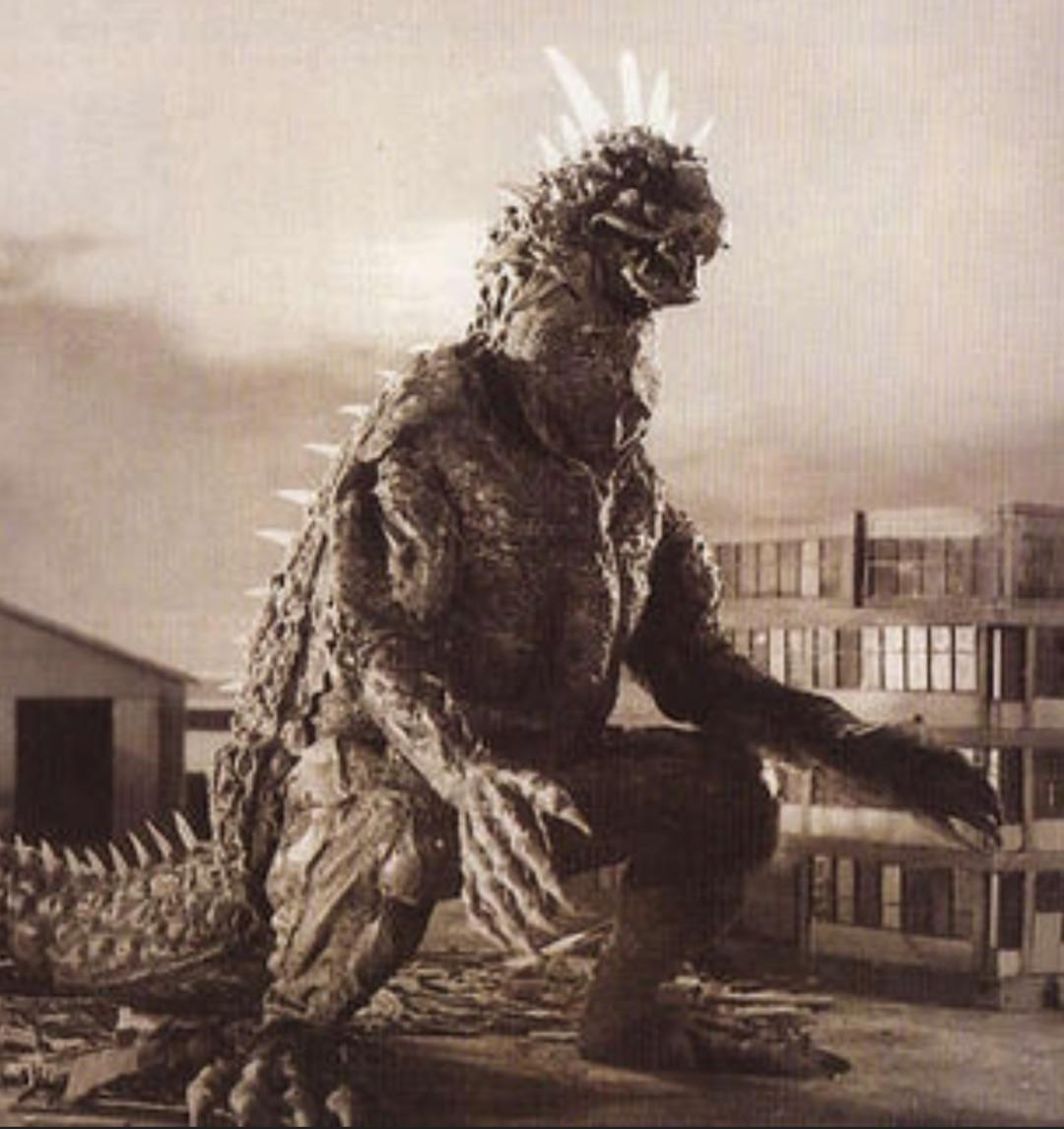
- Varan as portrayed by Haruo Nakajima via suitmation in Varan the Unbelievable (1958)
- First appearance: Varan the Unbelievable (1958)
- Last appearance: Godzilla: Final Wars (2004)
- Created by: Ken Kuronuma; Shinichi Sekizawa; Eiji Tsuburaya
- Designed by: Teizo Toshimitsu; Kanju Yagi; Yasuei Yagi; Keizō Murase
- Portrayed by: Haruo Nakajima; Katsumi Tezuka
- Aliases: Baran; Giant Flying Squirrel Monster (むささび怪獣 Musasabi Kaijū); Monster from the East (東洋の怪物 Tōyō no Kaibutsu); Obaki
- Species: Giant prehistoric reptile (Varanopode)

Varan (Japanese: バラン, Hepburn: Baran) is a kaiju which first appeared in Ishirō Honda's 1958 film Varan the Unbelievable, produced and distributed by Toho. The creature is depicted as a giant, dinosaurian, prehistoric reptile capable of gliding flight. He later appeared in the 1968 film Destroy All Monsters, the ninth film in the Godzilla franchise.

The original concept that would later become Varan was developed by Ken Kuronuma, with the design conceived by special effects artist Eiji Tsuburaya, and Keizō Murase, who envisioned the kaiju as being a hybrid of Godzilla and a kappa of Japanese folklore. Suit actor Haruo Nakajima, having already portrayed Godzilla four years prior, was the first suit actor to portray the kaiju in the original 1958 film. Additionally, fellow suit actor Katsumi Tezuka performed some of Varan's water scenes.

While relatively obscure compared to most of Toho's kaiju library due to only having a major role in a single film, Varan has nonetheless retained some degree of popularity over the years, being considered for many unrealized film projects and making appearances in non-film media such as comic books and video games.

== Appearances ==
Since his first appearance in 1958, Varan has been featured in various entertainment mediums, in addition to comic books, novels, television series, and video games. In each appearance, artists have put their own spin on the character.

=== Films ===
Varan made his first appearance on the silver screen in 1958, in the film Varan the Unbelievable. In the film, Varan, a prehistoric reptile worshipped as the mountain deity "Baradagi" by the remote Iwaya village, is awakened by a group of scientists exploring the remote region of the mountain lake where he resides. Emerging from the lake, Varan destroys the entire village in a rage, killing many people. When the Japanese Defence Force arrives, they lure Varan out of the lake with flares before bombarding him with artillery, which seems to have no effect. Climbing to the highest peak, Varan unveils the large membranes under his arms, diving off the cliff, and gliding across the sky towards the ocean. Swimming towards the mainland, Varan is bombarded with countless bombs and artillery which do little to stop him, however, he seems to retreat when a truck carrying experimental explosives detonates underneath him. Devising a new strategy, the JSDF attaches some of the same explosives onto a series of flares in the hopes that Varan would swallow them. The plan appears to work, as Varan devours two of the explosives before they detonate, causing severe pain he retreats into the ocean before the last explosive detonates, seemingly killing him. In the American version of the film, released in 1962 as Varan the Unbelievable, Varan is not shown as capable of flight, with his fate being completely different than the original version. In this version, Varan is severely injured in an explosion, with the film ending with the kaiju crawling back into the ocean, never to be seen again.

Varan's next appearance was in the 1968 film Destroy All Monsters. Set at the end of the 20th Century, a possible juvenile member of Varan's species is shown residing in a containment area with many other kaiju known as Monster Island, located in the Ogasawara island chain. Varan's relative peace is soon shattered by the arrival of the alien race of world conquers known as the Kilaaks. Taking control of all the island's monsters, including Varan, and sending them on a rampage across the world in a global assault. Once the Kilaakian's control of the monsters is severed, Varan watched as many of the other kaiju defeat the Kilaak's own monster King Ghidorah at their base near Mount Fuji. Once Ghidorah and the Kilaaks are defeated, Varan and all the other monsters return to Monster Island to live out their days in peace.

He made a brief cameo in the 2004 film Godzilla: Final Wars, via stock footage, depicting Earth besieged by various kaiju in the 20th century before the formation of the Earth Defense Force (EDF). He is briefly seen when a child is shown playing with several kaiju action figures, including one depicting Varan.

=== Literature ===
Varan made his first foray away from the silver screen in the comic book anthology series The Godzilla Comic, first published on February 10, 1990. In the comic's seventh segment Monster Warrior Godzilla, Varan exists in an alternate reality where all kaiju, including himself, are humanoid warriors living on different planets. Varan later appeared in the IDW Publishing miniseries Godzilla: Rulers of Earth (2013 to 2015). In issues #4-5, Varan is shown emerging from a lake in China, traveling to a military bunker where he clashes with Rodan and Gaira before vanishing into the ocean. He is later shown in flashback, appearing in the ocean with Ebirah to attack the escaping islanders. In the final issue, Varan is revealed to have been captured by a race of power-absorbing aliens called Trilopods and is later freed by King Caesar, taking part in the final assault against the aliens before following Godzilla back into the ocean. In the miniseries Godzilla in Hell (2015), A demonic representation of Varan emerges from the Eternal Ocean of Hell after Godzilla falls from the ice, following his fight with the demon Anguirus. Varan immediately attacks Godzilla, with a short fight ensuing ending in Godzilla defeating him with his atomic breath. Varan appeared in the fifth and final issue of Godzilla: Rage Across Time (2016). Set in the Late Cretaceous Period, Varan is shown alongside Anguirus, and Baragon as they battle Godzilla until the arrival of Keizer Ghidorah, who subsequently defeats all of the monsters.

Varan made his literary debut in 1996, with the children's picture book Godzilla on Monster Island. In the story, Varan and Anguirus discover Mothra's cocoon washed up on the beach of Monster Island while going for a walk together, prompting Anguirus to seek Godzilla's help in protecting it. He appeared in Godzilla 2000, the second novel in Marc Cerasini's Godzilla series. In the novel, an asteroid crashes into the Gulf of Mexico near the Yucatan Peninsula, releasing Varan who swims to the shore of Mexico, going on a destructive rampage until it is wounded by armed forces once it reaches Galveston, Texas. He is last mentioned retreating back into the Gulf of Mexico. In Godzilla: Journey to Monster Island (1998), Varan is one of the monsters who confront Godzilla, with the former later attacking the other monsters until he is subdued by Godzilla. Varan made a brief appearance in Godzilla Likes to Roar! (1998). In Godzilla vs. the Space Monster (1998), a sequel to Journey to Monster Island, 'Varan joins forces with Godzilla and the other inhabitants of Monster Island to defeat King Ghidorah, returning to the island once the battle is finished. Who's Afraid of Godzilla? (1998). In the story, Varan is one of the inhabitants of Monster Island when it is taken over by Megalon and Gigan after Godzilla leaves. In the 2017 novel Godzilla: Monster Apocalypse, a prequel to the film Godzilla: Planet of the Monsters (2017), multiple Varans come ashore in Los Angeles in 2030 along with Baragon and Anguirus after they were attacked by Godzilla in the Pacific Ocean. All three kaiju are killed by a single blast of Godzilla's atomic breath.

=== Other media ===
Varan has made an appearance in five video games, with a vast majority of these being solely released in Japan. He first appeared as a boss in Godzilla: Monster of Monsters! (1988), a Nintendo Entertainment System game. His next appearance was in Kaijū-ō Godzilla (1993), a Nintendo Game Boy game, as a boss on the fifth level of the game. He next appeared in the 1995 Sega Pico game Godzilla: Heart-Pounding Monster Island!!, released exclusively in Japan. He was featured in the Sega Dreamcast game Godzilla Generations (1998). In 2007, he was featured as an unlockable character in the Wii console version of Godzilla Unleashed, serving as a member of monsters dedicated to defending Earth from threats. Keeping with the supernatural backstory of his original appearance, the webseries Godziban depicts Varan as a bakemono that shapeshifts into a Japanese giant flying squirrel.

== Concept and creation ==
=== Development and design ===
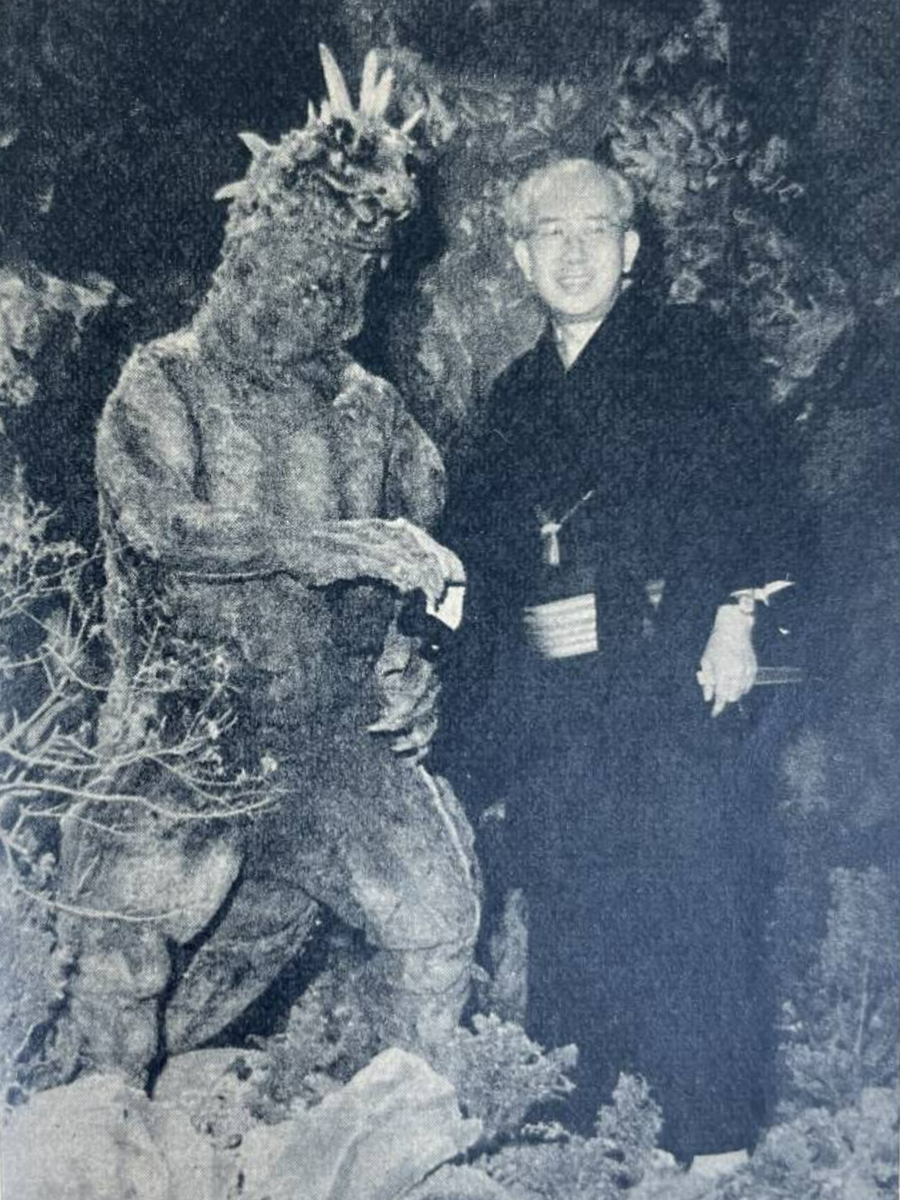
Haruo Nakajima (in the suit) shakes hands with Varan creator Ken Kuronuma.

The initial concept of Varan was developed by Ken Kuronuma, who had previously been responsible for the creation of the kaiju film Rodan (1956). After the financial success of Godzilla (1954) and Rodan, Toho began developing a new potential monster that could both fly and breathe underwater. Kuronuma developed the initial story outline, which was then scripted by Shinichi Sekizawa. Sekizawa wrote many scenes that did not make it into the final film; one scene had children imitating the monster, indicating that Sekizawa recognized children's attraction to the kaiju genre. The American version completely removed scenes of Varan flying, while also changing the kaiju's fate at the end of the film.

The physical design for Varan has undergone little change throughout his film appearances, with both filmmakers keeping with the original concept for the character. Varan's design was initially conceived by special effects artist Eiji Tsuburaya, who envisioned the kaiju as being a hybrid of Godzilla and a kappa of Japanese folklore. Concept art was completed by art director Akira Watanabe who incorporated the membranes of a gliding lizard into the design.

Each portion of the kaiju costume was modeled by different artists. Varan's head was modeled by Teizo Toshimitsu, his body by Kanju and Yasuei Yagi, and his skin, back, and claws by Keizō Murase. To make the claws and spikes appear transparent, Murase used vinyl hoses that he purchased from a general store. He then cut each piece to various lengths before individually wrapping them in a semitransparent vinyl sheet, making them appear less see-through, at the request of Tsuburaya. The suit's eyes were similarly translucent, allowing built-in lights to shine through, while the pupils were drawn onto the eyes with a magic marker. For Varan's back scales, Murase used peanut shells which he pressed into the mold, giving the design a wrinkled and bumpy texture. The peanuts themselves were supplied by one of the Yagi brothers, who had been regularly receiving peanuts from his relatives. Murase has stated that the idea for the design of the back scales came from a conversation with Tsuburaya after the two of them were eating peanuts. At one point during their conversation, Murase pointed out the shells' texture to Tsuburaya, which he felt was ideal for Varan's design. To convince the special effects artist of this, Murase created a sample mold from the peanuts. The few color stills which exist depict the suit as brown, with Murase himself described the Varan suit as being a "chocolate sepia color."

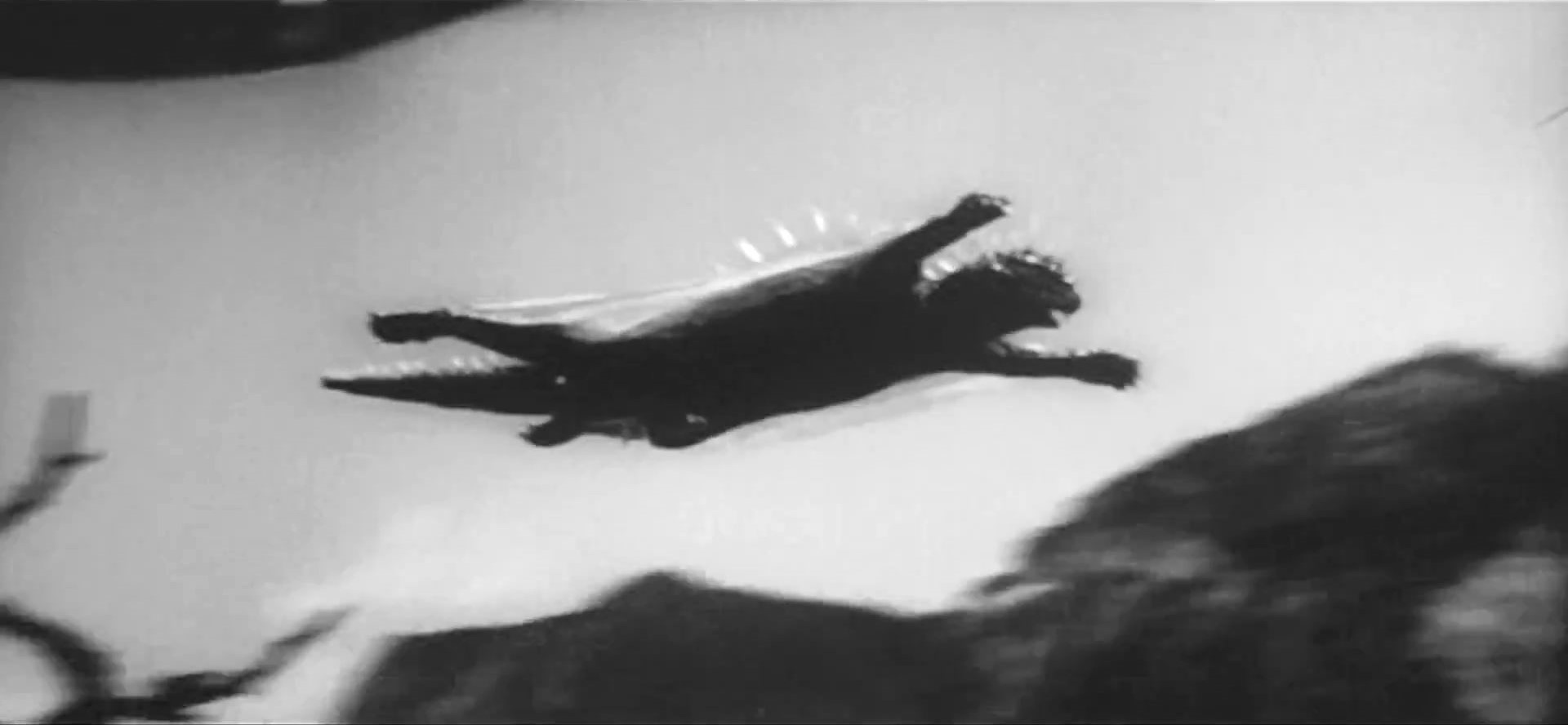
Scenes in the film depicting Varan in flight were implemented using a specially designed prop.

Tsuburaya later expressed disappointment with the final design, commenting that it was excessively muscular. Murase attempted to combat the issue through numerous adjustments, such as applying sawdust to the surface and blending the muscles with paint to obscure it but was unable to alter the suit's internal structure. A full-body flying prop and hand-operated puppet of Varan's upper half, both half-size, were created to portray the monster for certain scenes.

Varan's next appearance ten years later in Destroy All Monsters was originally written in a more substantial role, with the original script having him joining the other monsters in their final battle with Ghidorah. This scene was removed in subsequent rewrites, with Varan only making brief appearances in the film in long shots. It was believed that the original half-scale gliding Varan puppet was reused for the film, however, some sources have written that the prop was entirely new and created from scratch.

=== Portrayal ===
Wanting Varan's movements to appear more realistic, an actor, or suit actor, was used to portray the character, wearing a specially-design suit in a commonly used technique of the kaiju genre known as "suitmation". Suit actor Haruo Nakajima, having already portrayed Godzilla four years prior, was the first suit actor to portray the kaiju in the original 1958 film. Fellow suit actor Katsumi Tezuka was also hired to perform some of Varan's water scenes. Nakajima spent most of his scenes roving on his knees while portraying the kaiju, although this technique later proved extremely hazardous. In a later interview, Nakajima recalled an incident while filming the climactic battle on Haneda Airport, during the shoot a miniature truck filled with explosives detonated underneath him. The resulting explosion inflicted extensive burns to Nakajima's belly and groin. He commented that he did not tell producers of the incident, as he recalled "I didn't want them to worry about me". This was the only time the suit actor suffered an on-set injury.

=== Abandoned projects ===
Varan is known for appearing in early drafts of several films, but subsequent rewrites replaced him with other kaiju, or, in some cases, the film's concept was dropped entirely. In Shinichi Sekizawa's story treatment for the twelfth Godzilla film, titled The Return of King Ghidorah, Varan was set to appear alongside Rodan as one of Godzilla's allies to help him face off against King Ghidorah, Gigan, and an all-new monster named Mogu. Ultimately Sekizawa reworked his original concept into what became Godzilla vs. Gigan (1972), removing Varan and Rodan in favor of Angurius battling alongside Godzilla against Gigan and Ghidorah.

Varan was considered as the main antagonist in the final film of the Heisei Godzilla series (1984-1995). In the original story proposal for Godzilla 7, Varan was intended to be an evil creature and the harbinger of end times that appears in the year 1999 to destroy the world. Godzilla and his adopted son would have teamed up to defeat Varan, with the film ending at the start of the new millennium. This story concept was short-lived, with other proposals abandoning the kaiju, the final version would introduce a new kaiju as Godzilla's final antagonist in Godzilla vs. Destoroyah (1995).

An early draft of Godzilla, Mothra and King Ghidorah: Giant Monsters All-Out Attack (2001), featured Varan as one of Japan's guardian monsters. In the draft, Varan was the "White Wind Monster", known originally as Baradaki, who joined forces with the ice creature Anguirus to battle Godzilla in Yokohama. When the fire monster Baragon is revived by a lightning bolt, he joins his comrades in the battle. While all three are slain by Godzilla, they do enough damage to allow the JSDF's advanced warship Gotengo to arrive and ultimately defeat him. The draft was penned by Shusuke Kaneko and approved by producer Shogo Tomiyama, and design for Varan commenced but was halted after the studio rejected the idea of Varan and Anguirus' inclusion, wanting more marketable monsters for the film in response to the disappointing box-office returns of Godzilla vs. Megaguirus (2000). Varan was replaced by the more popular Mothra and Anguirus was replaced with King Ghidorah. Designer and modeler Fuyuki Shinada was disappointed with the character's exclusion, compromising by sculpting Varan's facial fins onto the heads of the King Ghidorah suit.

== Characteristics ==
From his silver screen debut in 1958, Varan has undergone little change in subsequent appearances in both film and other media, with each artist and writer adding their own spin to the character while adhering to the character's original portrayal.

=== Physical appearance ===
In the original film, Varan is depicted as a massive dinosaur, belonging to the fictional "Varanopode" species. Standing at 50 metres (160 ft), in height, and weighing 15,000 metric tons, Varan is mostly quadrupedal, with the occasional bipedal stance when preparing to glide. The head, which is relatively small in proportion to his body, has a pair of fin-like spines on the sides of his face. A single row of large spines also runs down from the top of his head to the end of his long, prehensile tail. His skin is separated into two distinct portions, the upper portion of Varan's body is covered in a multitude of bumpy, wart-like scales that give the appearance of an external shell, while the lower half is relatively smooth. The most unique feature, however, is the pair of thin membranes between his arms and legs which can unfold from the sides of his torso, similar to a gliding lizard. In Destroy All Monsters, Varan's physical appearance remained relatively the same, however, this version was significantly smaller than the previous incarnation, standing at only 30 metres (98 ft) as opposed to the original's 50 metres (160 ft). This gave rise to the notion that the incarnation was a juvenile member of the species and not the original Varan, with some sources listing this incarnation as "Varan (Second Generation)".

=== Powers and abilities ===
Varan is portrayed as being easily adaptable to different environments, and equally capable of moving on land, water, and air. Similar to fellow kaiju Godzilla, Varan is perfectly adapted to living underwater and on land. His most unique feature is his ability to fly, which he does through the use of membranes underneath his arms and legs. Unfolding these membranes, Varan is capable of achieving a gliding flight in a manner akin to that of a gliding lizard or flying squirrel, the latter comparison would give rise to the character's nickname in some media as the "Giant Flying Squirrel Monster". In Godzilla Giant Monsters Super Encyclopedia, Varan is listed as being able to glide at up to speeds of Mach 1.5. In the novelization Godzilla 2000, author Marc Cerasini provided an alternate explanation for Varan's gliding ability, adding that the kaiju "somehow separat[ing] the oxygen and hydrogen in water. The creature then expels the oxygen and pumps the hydrogen molecules into sacs along its torso". In both the games and reference materials, Varan is able to use his back spines offensively against his opponents. Tomoyuki Tanaka, producer of Varan and Destroy All Monsters, has written that Varan's back spines can inject an extremely toxic poison into his opponents. However, this ability is never depicted in either of Varan's on-screen appearances, in addition, Tanaka did not clarify if this ability was exclusive to the first or second generation of the kaiju.

In Godzilla: Unleashed, the game developers implemented a new set of abilities for the kaiju, depicting Varan as being capable of communicating through vast distances through the use of sonic waves, an ability that the kaiju could utilize as a form of attack, firing a large beam of sonic energy from his mouth in addition to firing several concentrated balls of sonic energy that detonate on impact.

== Legacy ==
While relatively obscure in comparison to other kaiju in the Godzilla franchise, Varan has retained a longevity within the series. According to web publication Screen Rant, Varan has become a popular character among kaiju fans, with the site including him in their list of "10 of the Most Underrated Kaiju", and later in their "8 New Toho Monsters Who Could Help Godzilla In Godzilla vs. Kong 2", the latter article noted the kaiju's versatility. Varan's design later became highly influential in the Netflix anime series Godzilla Singular Point (2021), where the kaiju's physical appearance was an inspiration for the design of Godzilla Amphibia evolutionary stage.

Varan has also been produced and marketed as merchandise over the years, with various companies releasing their own merchandising line. In 1970, Japanese toy company Bullmark produced a nine-inch Varan vinyl toy. In 1984, Bandai introduced their line of Varan figures for the next thirty years.

== Works cited ==
=== Books ===
- ウルトラブックス怪獣総進撃 [Ultra Books: Destroy All Monsters] (in Japanese). Japan: Asahi Sonorama. 1968.
- ゴジラ大怪獣超百科 [Godzilla Giant Monsters Super Encyclopedia] (in Japanese) (1st ed.). Japan: Kodansha. April 20, 1992. ISBN 978-4-0630-4270-2.
- Toho Tokusatsu All Monster Encyclopedia (in Japanese). Japan: Shogakukan. July 23, 2014. ISBN 978-4-09-682090-2.
- 別冊映画秘宝 オール東宝怪獣大図鑑 [All Toho Monsters Pictorial Book] (in Japanese) (4th ed.). Japan: Yosensha. September 4, 2016. p. 176. ISBN 978-4-8003-0362-2.
- Encyclopedia of All Monsters (in Japanese). Japan: Kodansha. 2021. ISBN 978-4-0652-3491-4.
- Arnold, Gordon (November 30, 2023). 21st Century Kaiju: The Resurgence of Giant Monster Movies. McFarland & Company. ISBN 978-1-4766-8962-3.
- Barr, Jason (2016). The Kaiju Film: A Critical Study of Cinema's Biggest Monsters. United States: McFarland & Company. ISBN 978-1-4766-2395-5.
- Barr, Jason (October 2, 2023). The Kaiju Connection Giant Monsters and Ourselves. McFarland & Company. ISBN 978-1-4766-5150-7.
- Endo, Kei (1985). 東宝 SF 特撮映画シリーズ [Toho SF Tokusatsu Eiga Shirizu] (in Japanese). Japan: Toho Publishing. ISBN 978-4-9246-0907-5.
- Iwabatake, Toshiaki; Ono, Koichiro (December 5, 1991). ゴジラvsキングギドラ 怪獣大全集 [Godzilla vs. King Ghidorah Monster Complete Works] (in Japanese). Japan: Kodansha. ISBN 978-4-0617-7720-0.
- Kaneda, Masumi; Oishi, Shinji; Konuta, Kenji; Eguchi, Mizuki; Maruyama, Takeshi (July 23, 2014). 東宝特撮全怪獣図鑑 [Toho Special Effects All Monster Encyclopedia] (in Japanese). Japan: Shogakukan. ISBN 978-4-0968-2090-2.
- Kawakita, Koichi; Sugita, Hiroki; Sasaki, Yu; Toya, Koichi; Kamatsu, Tadashi, eds. (December 10, 1993). ゴジラ大百科・メカゴジラ編 [Encyclopedia of Godzilla (Mechagodzilla Edition)] (in Japanese). Japan: Gakken. ISBN 978-4-0560-0174-7.
- Lees, J.D.; Cerasini, Marc (1998). The Official Godzilla Compendium. Random House. ISBN 0-679-88822-5.
- LeMay, John (June 15, 2017). The Big Book of Japanese Giant Monster Movies: The Lost Films. Bicep Books. ISBN 978-1-5481-4525-5.
- Mamiya, Naohiko (January 1, 2000). ゴジラ1954-1999超全集 [Godzilla 1954-1999 Super Complete Works] (in Japanese). Japan: Shogakukan. ISBN 978-4-0910-1470-2.
- Mook, TJ (2023). Godzilla Dismantled 全書 (in Japanese). Japan: Takarajimasha. ISBN 978-4-8002-5699-7.
- Motoyama, Sho; Matsunomoto, Kazuhiro; Asai, Kazuyasu; Suzuki, Nobutaka; Kato, Masashi (2012). 東宝特撮映画大全集 [Toho Special Effects Movie Complete Works] (in Japanese). Village Books. ISBN 978-4-8649-1013-2.
- Murase, Keizo (September 24, 2015). 怪獣秘蔵写真集 造形師村瀬継蔵 [Monster Maker: Keizo Murase - Treasured KAIJU Photobook] (in Japanese). Japan: Yosensha. ISBN 978-4-8003-0756-9.
- Nakamura, Tetsu; Shiraishi, Masahiko; Aita, Tetsuo; Tomoi, Taketo; Shimazaki, Jun; Maruyama, Takeshi; Shimizu, Toshifumi; Hayakawa, Masaru (November 29, 2014). ゴジラ東宝チャンピオンまつりパーフェクション [Godzilla Toho Champion Festival Perfection] (in Japanese). ASCII Media Works. ISBN 978-4-0486-6999-3.
- Ragone, August (2007). Eiji Tsuburaya: Master of Monsters. Chronicle Books. ISBN 978-0-8118-6078-9.
- Rovin, Jeff (January 1, 1989). The Encyclopedia of Monsters. Facts On File Inc. ISBN 978-0-8160-2303-5.
- Ryfle, Steve (1998). Japan's Favorite Mon-star: The Unauthorized Biography of "The Big G". United States: ECW Press. ISBN 978-1-5502-2348-4.
- Ryfle, Steve; Godziszewski, Ed (2017). Ishiro Honda: A Life in Film, from Godzilla to Kurosawa. Wesleyan University Press. ISBN 978-0-8195-7087-1.
- Sharp, Jasper (October 13, 2011). Historical Dictionary of Japanese Cinema. United States: Scarecrow Press. ISBN 978-0-8108-7541-8.
- Skipper, Graham (November 8, 2022). Godzilla: The Ultimate Illustrated Guide. United States: Welbeck Publishing Group. ISBN 978-1-8027-9457-1.
- Tanaka, Tomoyuki (April 20, 1992). 決定版ゴジラ入門 [Definitive Edition Godzilla Introduction] (in Japanese) (7th ed.). Japan: Shogakukan. ISBN 978-4-0922-0142-2.
- てれびくん編集部 (Televi-Kun Editorial Department) (2002). ゴジラ・モスラ・キングギドラ大怪獣総攻撃超全集 [Godzilla, Mothra and King Ghidorah: Giant Monsters All-Out Attack Super Complete Works] (in Japanese). Japan: Shogakukan. ISBN 978-4-09-101481-8.
- Way, Jennifer (July 15, 2015). King Kong and Other Monstrous Apes. United States: Rosen Publishing. ISBN 978-1-4994-3539-9.
- Weisser, Thomas; Weisser, Yuko (1998). Japanese Cinema: The Essential Handbook (4th ed.). United States: Vital Groups, Incorporated. ISBN 978-1-8892-8850-5.
- Yamada, Masami (December 1, 1995). 大ゴジラ図鑑2 [The Pictorial Book of Godzilla 2] (in Japanese). Japan: Hobby Japan. ISBN 978-4-8942-5117-5.

=== Periodicals ===
- "Eiji Tsuburaya: Films - Varan". Toho Films (English sales catalogue). Toho. 1962. p. 75.
- Tanaka, Issei [in Japanese] (September 1958). "映画の魔術師円谷英二" [Cinematic Magician Eiji Tsuburaya]. The Toho Graphic (in Japanese). Japan: Toho.

=== Media ===
- Ishirō Honda (Director) (1958). Giant Monster Varan (Motion picture). Japan: Toho.
- Ishirō Honda (Director) (1968). Destroy All Monsters (Motion picture). Japan: Toho.
- Ryuhei Kitamura (Director) (2004). Godzilla: Final Wars (Motion picture). Japan: Toho.

=== Other books ===
- England, Norman (November 22, 2021). Behind the Kaiju Curtain: A Journey Onto Japan's Biggest Film Sets. Awai Books. ISBN 9781937220105.
- Galbraith IV, Stuart (1998). Monsters are Attacking Tokyo!. Feral House. ISBN 9780922915477.
