= Baragon =

Fictional monster, or kaiju

- Godzilla character
- Baragon as depicted via suitmation in the 1968 film Destroy All Monsters
- First appearance: Frankenstein vs. Baragon (1965)
- Last appearance: Godzilla, Mothra and King Ghidorah: Giant Monsters All-Out Attack (2001)
- Designed by: Akira Watanabe
- Portrayed by: Shōwa series: Haruo Nakajima; Millennium series: Rie Ōta
- Modeled by: Keizō Murase

In-universe information
- Species: Subterranean dinosaurian creature

Baragon (バラゴン, Baragon) is a kaiju which first appeared in Ishirō Honda's 1965 film Frankenstein vs. Baragon, produced and distributed by Toho. Depicted as a burrowing, four-legged, horned dinosaur-like creature with large ears, Baragon served as the film's antagonist, fighting against Frankenstein and wreaking havoc across the Japanese countryside. Baragon would later appear in the Godzilla franchise, also produced by Toho, starting with Destroy All Monsters (1968), where it is one of the many monsters that appear within the film. Baragon later appears in Godzilla, Mothra and King Ghidorah: Giant Monsters All-Out Attack (2001), where it is depicted as a guardian monster of Japan, though it is killed fighting Godzilla. Baragon also appears in various pieces of spin-off media for the franchise.

Baragon was conceived during the production of Frankenstein vs. Baragon as a replacement for Godzilla, who was intended to be Frankenstein's initial opponent before Toho decided to remove Godzilla from the project. Designed by Akira Watanabe, it was portrayed by suitmation in the film. Its creature suit was later loaned off to Tsuburaya Productions for use in the Ultraman franchise, though it was returned for Destroy All Monsters. As the film was planned as a finale for the Godzilla franchise, as many monsters as possible were included in the film, though Baragon's role in the film was greatly diminished due to issues with its costume. It would not appear in another film until 2001's Godzilla, Mothra and King Ghidorah: Giant Monsters All-Out Attack. Initially part of a trio of monsters, alongside Varan and Anguirus, meant to fight Godzilla, Baragon ended up being the only one retained for the final product due to Toho requiring that more popular monsters be included to make up for the financial failure of 2000's Godzilla vs. Megaguirus.

Baragon has been discussed by critics for its general obscurity in the Godzilla franchise, while the symbolism in its film roles have also been analyzed.

== Appearances ==
Baragon is a quadrupedal kaiju, who is significantly smaller compared to other kaiju, being only 82 feet tall and 150 feet long. it has large ears, a bony shell on its back, and a large horn on its forehead. Baragon has advanced agility and versatile movement, in particular having the ability to burrow beneath the ground. While burrowing, it is capable of causing earthquakes and avalanches. Baragon additionally has the ability to fire a heat ray to attack in some of its appearances, as well as electrical bolts.

=== In film ===
In the 1965 film Frankenstein vs. Baragon, Baragon is depicted as a kaiju descended from the dinosaurs, having escaped extinction by burrowing underground. During the film, Baragon attacks the surrounding countryside, and as it is not seen, the locals blame the mutant human Frankenstein for the attacks. While searching for Frankenstein, a group of scientists set off explosives, which attracts Baragon. It attacks the scientists, but Frankenstein arrives to protect them. The two engage each other in battle, with the latter defeating Baragon by breaking its neck before a fissure opens and swallows both of them into the Earth.

Baragon re-appears in the 1968 film Destroy All Monsters, which marks its first appearance in the Godzilla franchise. Baragon is one of the many Earth monsters kept in captivity on Monster Island. Baragon later aids in the battle against the alien Kilaaks' strongest monster, King Ghidorah, who was sent to kill Earth's monsters. Following Ghidorah's defeat, it returns to live in peace on Monster Island.

In the 2001 film Godzilla, Mothra and King Ghidorah: Giant Monsters All-Out Attack, Baragon is depicted as one of Japan's three ancient guardian monsters. When Godzilla is revived by the vengeful souls of the people who died in World War II, Baragon and its fellow guardians Mothra and King Ghidorah are revived to confront him. While the three are ultimately killed in battle, they weaken Godzilla enough for the Japan Self-Defense Forces (JSDF) to kill it.

=== In spin-off media ===
Baragon appears in three spin-off television series, including 1992's Godzilland, 1997's Godzilla Island, and 2019's Godziban. In literature, Baragon appears in 1998's Godzilla vs. the Robot Monsters, 2012's Godzilla: Ongoing, 2013's Godzilla: Rulers of Earth, 2017's Godzilla: Monster Apocalypse, and 2018's Godzilla: Project Mechagodzilla.

Baragon appears in a variety of video games in the Godzilla franchise, including 1988's Godzilla: Monster of Monsters!, 1990's Godzilla, 1991's Godzilla 2: War of the Monsters, 1998's Godzilla Trading Battle, 2004's Godzilla: Save the Earth, 2007's Godzilla: Unleashed, and 2019's Godzilla Defense Force.

== Conception and development ==
=== Frankenstein vs. Baragon (1965) ===
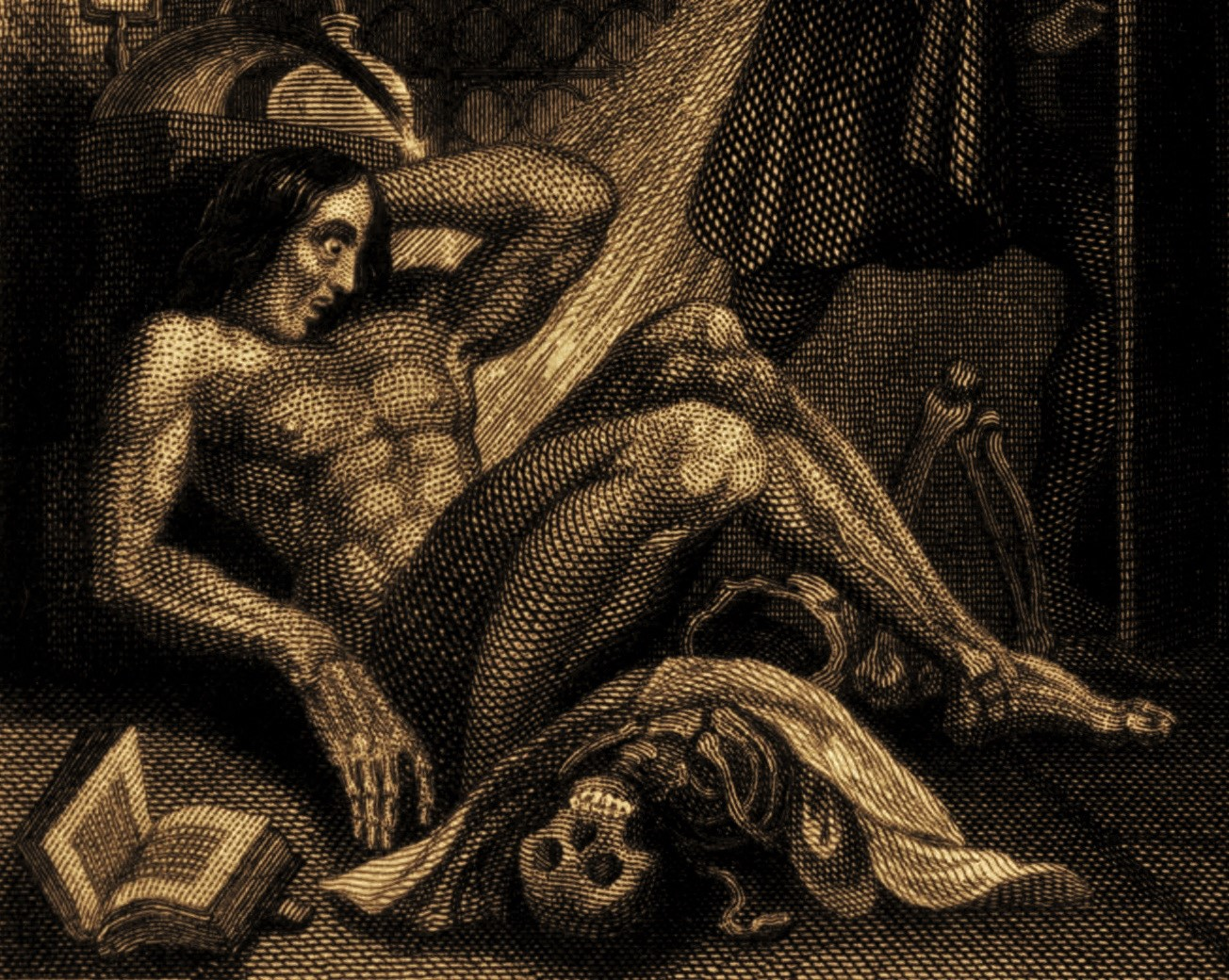
Baragon fights a depiction of Frankenstein's monster (pictured) in Frankenstein vs. Baragon

A co-production between United Productions of America and Toho, 1965's Frankenstein vs. Baragon was originally intended to feature Godzilla in place of Baragon. However, as Toho wanted to produce Mothra vs. Godzilla (1964) Godzilla was removed from the project. As a result, Baragon was created to fulfill Godzilla's place as Frankenstein's opponent in the film. Though the film's director, Ishirō Honda, intended for the film to focus more on the personal struggles of Frankenstein, Toho's desire for a larger focus on monsters resulted in Baragon becoming a major part of the film during development.

Baragon was portrayed via suitmation, with Baragon being visually designed by Akira Watanabe. Baragon's suit incorporated a number of different techniques, which included a light-up horn and jaws that could be opened and closed via remote control. Its eyes included a plate that could slide back and forth over it to allow the appearance of Baragon's eyes moving. The suit was notably much lighter than prior kaiju suits, making it easier to lift for scenes in which Baragon was airborne. Haruo Nakajima, wearing the Baragon suit, portrayed the monster on-screen in the film. Nakajima portrayed the monster with more animalistic movements than he had with other kaiju he had portrayed, with Nakajima attempting to replicate a lizard's form of movement while walking. A small doll was used to depict the scene of Baragon falling into the Earth with Frankenstein.

Following this film, the suit was loaned off to Tsuburaya Productions, who produces the Ultraman franchise, where Baragon's suit was repurposed and used to portray four different monsters for protagonist Ultraman to fight across multiple series.

=== Destroy All Monsters (1968) ===
1968's Destroy All Monsters was originally planned to be the last Godzilla-franchise film, and as such a large number of kaiju from prior Toho monster films were brought back, including Baragon. Baragon only plays a minor role in the film, however. Initially, it was planned to be seen destroying the Arc de Triomphe as part of a large assault by the alien Kilaaks, replacing the kaiju Maguma from Gorath (1962) who was initially planned to be used for this sequence. The Baragon costume was returned from Tsubaraya, with deterioration on the costume prevented as a result of the costume being covered in cloth while there. The costume was repaired, but many on the production team were worried the suit's ears would interfere with the sequence of Baragon emerging from the Earth. As a result, the kaiju Gorosaurus was substituted into Baragon's role, with Gorosaurus destroying the Arc in the final film. In the scene of the monsters amassing to fight King Ghidorah, Baragon is depicted using the small doll from its prior appearance instead of its costume. The Baragon suit would only be used in a brief on-screen appearance in the film in scenes depicting Monster Island, with a new head created for the suit which looked identical barring minor adjustments to its ears and a change in the direction of its horn.

=== Godzilla, Mothra, and King Ghidorah: Giant Monsters All-Out Attack (2001) ===
Baragon as it appears in its redesign in the 2001 film Godzilla, Mothra and King Ghidorah: Giant Monsters All-Out Attack

Baragon, alongside the kaiju Varan and Anguirus, were included in the initial draft for the 2001 film Godzilla, Mothra and King Ghidorah: Giant Monsters All-Out Attack. In this draft, written prior to the introduction of Mothra and King Ghidorah into the script, Baragon was depicted as an elemental "flame monster", serving alongside the other two kaiju as Japan's ancient guardian monsters. However, this plan was scrapped as a result of the financial failure of Godzilla vs. Megaguirus (2000), which resulted in Toho requiring that popular monsters King Ghidorah and Mothra be included instead to improve Giant Monsters All-Out Attack's profitability. Varan and Anguirus were removed as a result. Though Anguirus was initially considered to be retained, as it was considered more recognizable, Baragon was eventually elected to be retained instead since executive producer Shōgo Tomiyama and screenwriter Masahiro Yokotani felt Baragon made more sense to be easily defeated as Godzilla's first opponent in the film's narrative. Baragon's name was left out of the title of the film, which according to co-writer Shusuke Kaneko, was because, when asked to include Ghidorah and Mothra, Kaneko panicked when proposing the new title and accidentally left out Baragon's name.

Baragon was visibly redesigned for its appearance in the film, now colored red and with a smaller head. Its design was made to resemble komainu, and its eyes were made more realistic in order to contrast with Godzila's eyes, which in this film are pure white. The costume had swappable heads, with one allowing the horn to glow like the original suit, though this was never used in the final film. Baragon's suit actor was Rie Ōta, who was notably the first female actress to portray a kaiju in a Godzilla franchise film. Ōta was chosen due to her small stature, which helped to ensure a visible size difference between Godzilla and Baragon in the film. By having a significantly smaller creature be mercilessly defeated by Godzilla, Kaneko aimed to depict this version of Godzilla's extreme cruelty. Ōta took care to make sure her knees did not touch the ground while filming to accurately replicate Baragon's quadrupedal stance. A larger version of the Baragon suit was also constructed for close-ups and action poses, with this suit's actor being Toshiyoshi Sasaki.

Special effects director Makoto Kamiya often consulted still photographer Takashi Nakao—the only crew member from Frankenstein vs. Baragon still working at Toho—for advice on staging Baragon's movements and recreating its specific monster scenes in Giant Monsters All-Out Attack.

== Reception and analysis ==
Baragon has been regarded by critics as a relatively obscure kaiju within the franchise, as well as one often underutilized. The book The Kaiju Connection: Giant Monsters and Ourselves regarded this obscurity as being a result of the fact that Baragon lacked any significant character depth or battling strength, and often existed in subsequent appearances only to show the strength of other characters, namely Godzilla. Ben Hathway, writing for Comicbook, wrote that while Baragon's design was memorable, it was not given much to do in many of its film appearances. Jim Vorel, writing for Paste similarly stated that Baragon's existence in its Godzilla film appearances was an "afterthought", though noted that Baragon maintained a strong fan base in Japan for its appearances outside of the Godzilla franchise.

The book Giant Creatures in Our World: Essays on Kaiju and American Popular Culture described Baragon's role in its debut film as being a form of soft power in the wake of World War II, as whereas the Caucasian-presenting Frankenstein is depicted as "good", Baragon, a monster of Japanese origin, is depicted as indiscriminately wrecking havoc across the Japanese countryside. Thus, in a battle that represents "America vs Japan", Japan, via Baragon, is depicted as an antagonistic figure. In Baragon's role in Godzilla, Mothra and King Ghidorah: Giant Monsters All-Out Attack, the book 21st Century Kaiju: The Resurgence of Giant Monster Movies regarded Baragon, alongside Mothra and Ghidorah, as representing spiritual aspects of Japanese culture in their described role as "spiritual defenders", potentially representing ideas in relation to Oni and Shinto mythology. Baragon and other Guardian Monsters in the film are described by the book The Kaiju Film: A Critical Study of Cinema's Biggest Monsters as being symbolic representations of Japan's clashing ideals of "new" vs "old" traditions; younger people are depicted as disrespecting the past, notably by asking if Baragon is Godzilla when it first appears despite their lack of resemblance. This "forgetting" of the past is stated to be shown in the film via Godzilla's easy defeat of all three Guardians, showing the strength of these forgotten traditions over the strength of past ways of thinking.

=== Cultural references ===
The Pokémon species Nidoking is believed to be based on Baragon, with Nidoking sharing several design characteristics with Baragon while also being associated with a "Moon Stone" item, a reference to Baragon's nocturnal nature. Baragon also makes a cameo appearance in Dragon Ball.

== Works cited ==
=== Books ===
- 別冊映画秘宝 オール東宝怪獣大図鑑 [All Toho Monsters Pictorial Book] (in Japanese) (4th ed.). Japan: Yosensha. September 4, 2016. p. 176. ISBN 978-4-8003-0362-2.
- Godzilla Character Encyclopedia: Toho Special Effects Movie Complete History. Kodansha. July 15, 2014. ISBN 978-4062190046.
- Godzilla, Mothra and King Ghidorah: Giant Monsters All-Out Attack. Asahi Sonorama. January 10, 2002. ISBN 978-4257130444.
- Godzilla, Mothra and King Ghidorah: Giant Monsters All Out Attack Toho SF Special Effects Series SPECIAL EDITION. Toho. December 15, 2001. ISBN 4-924609-80-3.
- てれびくん編集部 (Televi-Kun Editorial Department) (2002). ゴジラ・モスラ・キングギドラ大怪獣総攻撃超全集 [Godzilla, Mothra and King Ghidorah: Giant Monsters All-Out Attack Super Complete Works] (in Japanese). Japan: Shogakukan. ISBN 978-4-09-101481-8.
- Arnold, Gordon (November 30, 2023). 21st Century Kaiju: The Resurgence of Giant Monster Movies. McFarland & Company. ISBN 978-1-4766-8962-3.
- Barr, Jason (2016). The Kaiju Film: A Critical Study of Cinema's Biggest Monsters. United States: McFarland & Company. ISBN 978-1-4766-2395-5.
- Barr, Jason (October 2, 2023). The Kaiju Connection Giant Monsters and Ourselves. McFarland & Company. ISBN 978-1-4766-5150-7.
- Kihara, Hirokatsu; Shimizu, Toshifumi; Nakamura, Tetsu (2010). "Godzilla" Toho Special Effects Unpublished Material Archive: Producer Tomoyuki Tanaka and His Era (in Japanese). Kadokawa Shoten. ISBN 978-4048544658.
- Mamiya, Naohiko (January 1, 2000). Godzilla 1954-1999 Super Complete Works. Shogakukan. ISBN 978-4091014702.
- Mook, TJ (2023). Godzilla Dismantled 全書 (in Japanese). Japan: Takarajimasha. ISBN 978-4-8002-5699-7.
- Motoyama, Sho; Matsunomoto, Kazuhiro; Asai, Kazuyasu; Suzuki, Nobutaka; Kato, Masashi (2012). 東宝特撮映画大全集 [Toho Special Effects Movie Complete Works] (in Japanese). Village Books. ISBN 978-4-8649-1013-2.
- Murguía, Salvador Jiménez (July 29, 2016). The Encyclopedia of Japanese Horror Films. Bloomsbury Publishing USA. ISBN 979-8-216-24575-9.
- Nishikawa, Shinji (August 25, 2023). Godzilla: The Encyclopedia. Graphic-sha Publishing. ISBN 978-1835410363.
- Oki, Renji (April 25, 2017). GODZILLA 怪獣黙示録 [GODZILLA: Monster Apocalypse] (in Japanese). Kadokawa. pp. 112–150. ISBN 978-4-04-106345-3.
- Oki, Renji (October 25, 2018). Godzilla プロジェクト・メカゴジラ [GODZILLA: Project Mechagodzilla] (in Japanese). Kadokawa. pp. 86–111. ISBN 978-4-04-106181-7.
- Pryor, Shawn (October 29, 2024). Kaiju Unleashed: An Illustrated Guide to the World of Strange Beasts. Epic Ink. ISBN 978-0-7603-9289-8.
- Rovin, Jeff (January 1, 1989). The Encyclopedia of Monsters. Facts On File Inc. ISBN 978-0-8160-2303-5.
- Ryfle, Steve (1998). Japan's Favorite Mon-star: The Unauthorized Biography of "The Big G". United States: ECW Press. ISBN 978-1-5502-2348-4.
- Ryfle, Steve; Godziszewski, Ed (2017). Ishiro Honda: A Life in Film, from Godzilla to Kurosawa. Wesleyan University Press. ISBN 978-0-8195-7087-1.
- Ryfle, Steve; Godziszewski, Ed (2025). Godzilla: The First 70 Years - The Official Illustrated History of the Japanese Productions. Abrams Books. ISBN 978-1419762116.
- Shioya, Masahiko; Fujikawa, Hideo (January 10, 2002). ゴジラモスラキングギドラ大怪獣総攻撃超全集 [Godzilla, Mothra and King Ghidorah: Giant Monsters All-Out Attack Super Complete Works] (in Japanese). Shogakukan. p. 31. ISBN 978-4-09-101481-8.
- Tanaka, Tomoyuki (1983). The Complete History of Toho Special Effects Movies (in Japanese). Toho Publishing Business Office. ISBN 4-924609-00-5.
- Yamada, Masami (December 1, 1995). The Pictorial Book of Godzilla 2. Hobby Japan. ISBN 978-4894251175.
