= Katsumi Tezuka =

Japanese actor (born 1912)

- 手塚 勝巳
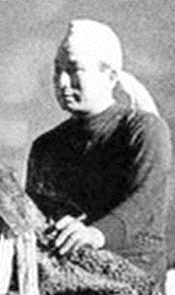
- Tezuka on the set of Godzilla Raids Again, 1955
- Born: August 31, 1912; Tokyo, Japan
- Occupation: Actor
- Years active: 1939–1967
- Known for: Godzilla, Anguirus, Varan

Katsumi Tezuka (手塚 勝巳, Tezuka Katsumi; born August 31, 1912, missing since the 1960's) was a Japanese actor. He is best known for playing monsters in several Toho science fiction and horror films directed by Ishirō Honda.

== Life and career ==
Tezuka was born in Tokyo, Japan on August 31, 1912. His first credited role in a motion picture was in the 1940 film Haruyo Izuko. He played a number of monster roles as an assistant to Haruo Nakajima.

== Filmography ==
=== Film ===
Year	Title	Role	Ref(s)
1939	Song of the White Orchid [Part One]	Member Miura	
1939	Song of the White Orchid [Part Two]	Member Miura	
1940	Hideko no Oendancho	Member of the Atlas	
1940	Haruyo Izuko	Ito Yokoyama	
1953	Eagle of the Pacific	MTF Air Staff	
1954	Godzilla	Godzilla / Hagiwara's editor	
1955	The Immortal Pitcher	Umpire	
1955	Godzilla Raids Again	Anguirus	
1956	Rodan	Hotel manager / Meganulon (legs)	
1957	The Mysterians	Moguera / villager / Mysterian	
1958	The H-Man	Fishing boat captain	
1958	Varan the Unbelievable	Varan	
1959	The Three Treasures		
1959	Battle in Outer Space	Defense Force vice admiral / Natarl	
1960	Storm Over the Pacific	Bride's assistance	
1961	The Story of Osaka Castle	Shuma Ono	
1961	Mothra	Mothra larva (neck) / photographer	
1962	Gorath	Maguma	
1962	King Kong vs. Godzilla	Godzilla (iceberg scene only)	
1963	Attack Squadron!	Director Shue Matsubayashi	
1963	Matango	Police officer / medical center doctor	
1963	Atragon	JSDF officer / Mu henchman	
1964	Mothra vs. Godzilla	Godzilla (assistant) / soldier	
1964	Ghidorah, the Three-Headed Monster	Godzilla	
1965	Retreat From Kiska	Captain of Akigumo	
1965	Beast Alley	Fukami	
1966	Kureji Dayo Kisoutengai	Ruling party member	
1967	Discover Japan with the 5 Gents	Company executive B	
1967	Five Gents Prefer Geisha	Tourism business person B	
