= Godzilla Raids Again =

1955 Japanese kaiju film

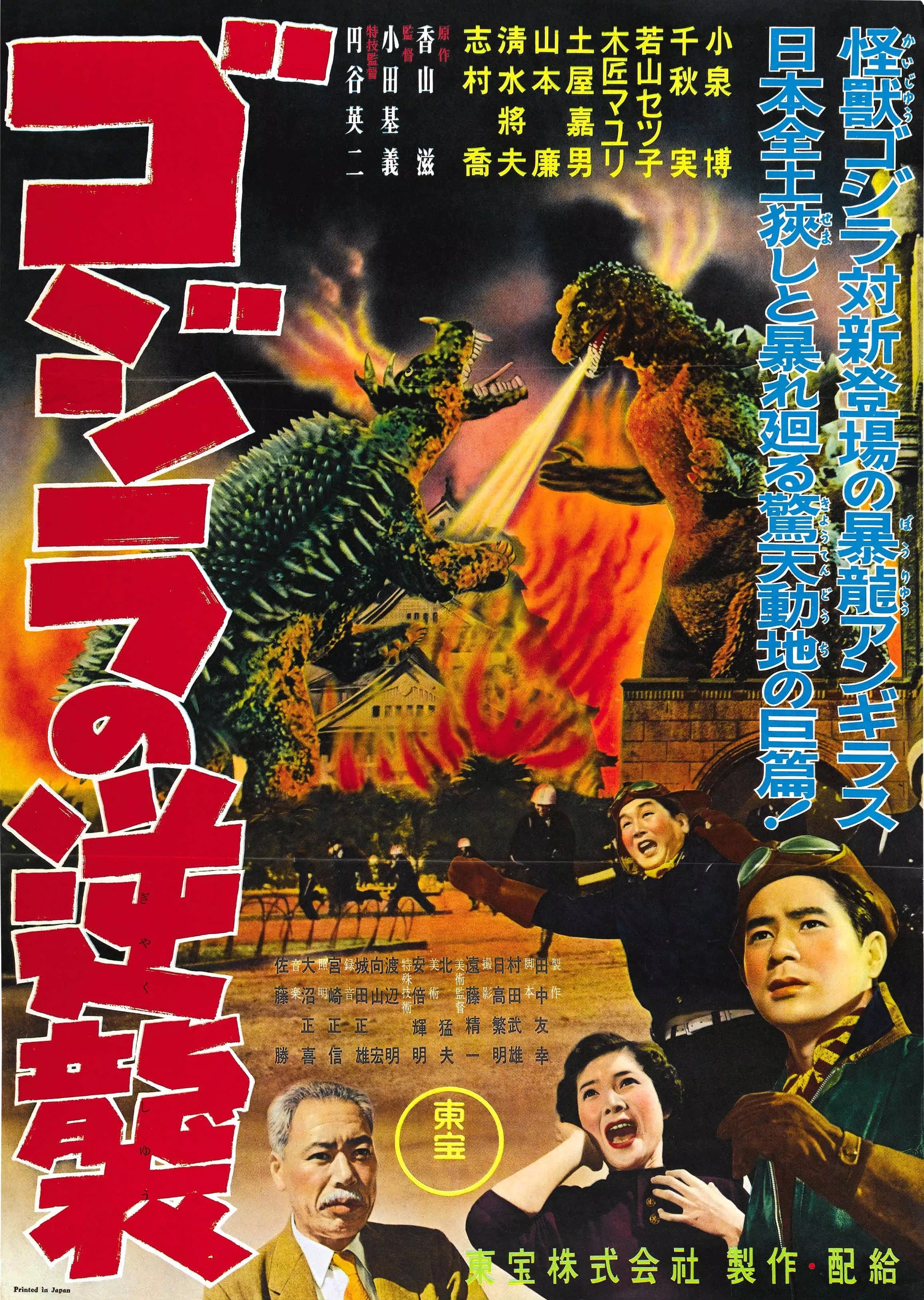
- Theatrical release poster

Japanese name
- Kanji: ゴジラの逆襲
Transcriptions
- Revised Hepburn: Gojira no Gyakushū
- Directed by: Motoyoshi Oda
- Special effects by: Eiji Tsuburaya
- Screenplay by: Takeo Murata; Shigeaki Hidaka
- Story by: Shigeru Kayama
- Produced by: Tomoyuki Tanaka
- Starring: Hiroshi Koizumi; Setsuko Wakayama; Minoru Chiaki; Takashi Shimura
- Cinematography: Seiichi Endo
- Edited by: Kazuji Taira
- Music by: Masaru Satō
- Production company: Toho Co., Ltd.
- Distributed by: Toho
- Release date: April 24, 1955 (Japan)
- Running time: 81 minutes
- Country: Japan
- Language: Japanese
- Budget: ¥32 million
- Box office: ¥170 million (Japan rentals)

Godzilla Raids Again (Japanese: ゴジラの逆襲, Hepburn: Gojira no Gyakushū; lit. 'Godzilla's Counterattack') is a 1955 Japanese kaiju film directed by Motoyoshi Oda, with special effects by Eiji Tsuburaya. Produced and distributed by Toho Co., Ltd., it is the second film in the Godzilla franchise, and a sequel to Godzilla (1954). The film stars Hiroshi Koizumi, Setsuko Wakayama, Minoru Chiaki, and Takashi Shimura, with Haruo Nakajima as Godzilla and Katsumi Tezuka as Anguirus. In the film, Japan struggles to survive the attack of the second Godzilla, as well as its destructive battle against its ancient foe Anguirus.

Executive producer Iwao Mori instructed producer Tomoyuki Tanaka to immediately commence production on a second Godzilla film, fearing to lose the momentum of the first film's success. Oda was chosen to direct the film as Ishirō Honda was busy directing Lovetide.

Godzilla Raids Again was released theatrically in Japan on April 24, 1955. A re-edited, English dubbed version was released theatrically in the United States on June 2, 1959, by Warner Bros. Pictures, under the title Gigantis, the Fire Monster. It played on a double feature with Teenagers from Outer Space.

The film was followed by King Kong vs. Godzilla, released on August 11, 1962.

== Plot ==
Shoichi Tsukioka, a pilot working for Kaiyo Fishing, Inc., guides a fishing trawler towards a school of bonito. His friend and fellow pilot Koji Kobayashi faces engine troubles and makes an emergency landing on Iwato Island. Tsukioka is sent to rescue Kobayashi, but they both encounter two giant dinosaurian creatures locked in battle: Godzilla and a new quadruped kaiju. The pilots escape as the monsters tumble into the sea.

Tsukioka and Kobayashi return to Osaka to help Dr. Yamane and the authorities investigate the encounter. The new monster is identified as an Ankylosaurus-like carnivore named Anguirus. Dr. Yamane shows the authorities footage of the original Godzilla's attack on Tokyo several months earlier. (Note: As depicted in Godzilla (1954)) He notes that the monster was killed by the Oxygen Destroyer, but its inventor, Daisuke Serizawa, perished during its activation, and that there are no proven countermeasures left against the new Godzilla. Dr. Yamane suggests issuing a blackout and using drop flares to lure Godzilla away due to its predecessor being sensitive to light.

Tsukioka’s girlfriend Hidemi, a plane dispatcher for the fishing company, expresses her concern for Osaka to him, and he reveals that he thought about her when he thought he might die on Iwato Island. They watch as the Japan Air Self-Defense Force (JASDF) search for Godzilla, but scientists note that it may prove difficult due to the possibility of Godzilla hiding in caves within the seabed. Later, Godzilla is spotted heading for the Kii Channel between Shikoku and Wakayama Prefecture. Yamaji, Tsukioka’s boss and Hidemi’s father, notes that if Godzilla wreaks havoc in those waters, their fishing company will lose valuable fishing ground and strike a blow at production.

Later, an alert is issued for the Osaka region as Godzilla changes course for Osaka Bay. The Japan Self-Defense Forces (JSDF) cut off the lights in the city and lure Godzilla with flares. Tsukioka leaves Hidemi at her home for safety and leaves with Kobayashi to meet Yamaji at his cannery. Convicts escape from their transport and lead police on a chase that ends with a few convicts crashing into an oil refinery, triggering an explosion, while other convicts escape into Osaka. The explosion lures Godzilla back to Osaka, forcing the JSDF to attack it. Attracted by the flares, Anguirus emerges and engages Godzilla. The kaijus battle throughout the city, destroying Yamaji’s cannery and killing the convicts in the process. Godzilla kills Anguirus and returns to the sea after burning the body with its atomic breath.

In the aftermath, Yamaji moves operations to Hokkaido to make full use of the fisheries and cannery, and also sends Kobayashi to guide trawlers. During a company dinner, Tsukioka reunites with Tajima, a friend from college, and the war. Kobayashi hints to Hidemi that he’s fallen in love with a certain woman. The dinner is interrupted by news that a ship was sunk by Godzilla. The following morning, Tsukioka helps the JASDF search for Godzilla and tracks its location on Kamiko Island. Kobayashi departs to aide Tsukioka but leaves his notebook behind. Hidemi peeks at the notebook and discovers a picture of her inside.

Kobayashi attempts to stop Godzilla from escaping but is struck by Godzilla’s atomic breath and crashes into the mountaintop, killing him. The crash creates a small avalanche that engulfs Godzilla, inspiring the JASDF to bury it with a bigger avalanche. Because they lack firepower, the JASDF return to base to reload missiles and Tajima reluctantly accepts Tsukioka’s request to take him. The JSDF creates a wall of fire on the island with barrels full of combustibles to block Godzilla’s escape, while the JASDF triggers avalanches by blasting the mountaintops. Godzilla exhales one last atomic breath before being completely buried by the last avalanche triggered by Tsukioka, the final surviving pilot. Relieved, Tsukioka lets Kobayashi's spirit know that they have finally defeated Godzilla.

== Cast ==
- Hiroshi Koizumi as Shoichi Tsukioka
- Setsuko Wakayama as Hidemi Yamaji
- Minoru Chiaki (Note: Credited as "Mindru Chiaki" in the American version of the film.) as Koji Kobayashi
- Takashi Shimura as Dr. Kyohei Yamane
- Masao Shimizu as Zoologist Dr. Tadokoro
- Seijirō Onda (Note: Credited as "Serjiro Onda" in the American version of the film.) as Captain Terasawa, JASDF
- Sōnosuke Sawamura as Hokkaido Branch Manager Shingo Shibeki
- Yoshio Tsuchiya as Tajima, JASDF
- Mayuri Mokushō as Radio Operator Yasuko Inouye
- Minosuke Yamada as Chief of Civil Defense
- Yukio Kasama (Note: Credited as "Yokio Kasama" in the American version of the film.) as Kohei Yamaji, President of the Fishery
- Senkichi Ōmura as Escaped Convict
- Ren Yamamoto as Commander of Landing Craft
- Shin Ōtomo as Convict Leader
- Haruo Nakajima as Godzilla
- Katsumi Tezuka as Anguirus

Cast taken from Japan's Favorite Mon-star, except where cited otherwise.

== Production ==
=== Crew ===
- Motoyoshi Oda (Note: Credited as "Motoyoshi Qdq" in the American version of the film.) – director
- Eiji Tsuburaya (Note: Credited as "Eliji Tsuburaya" in the American version of the film.) – special effects director
- Eiji Iwashiro – assistant director
- Kazuo Baba – production coordinator
- Takeo Kita – art director
- Sadamasa Arikawa – special effects photography
- Akira Watanabe – special effects art director
- Kiroshi Mukoyama – optical effects
- Masayoshi Onuma – lighting
- Masanobu Miyazawa – sound recording
- Ichiro Mitsunawa – sound effects

Personnel taken from Japan's Favorite Mon-star.

=== Development ===
"Believe it or not, we had no plans for a sequel and naively hoped that the end of Godzilla was going to coincide with the end of nuclear testing."

— Ishirō Honda on Toho's initial intentions.

A few weeks after Godzilla was released in November 1954, a welcome home party was held for executive producer Iwao Mori. During the party, Mori instructed producer Tomoyuki Tanaka to produce a sequel, due to Mori being pleased with the box office results for the first film.

Ishirō Honda, director of the first Godzilla film, was unavailable to return to direct the sequel due to directing Lovetide at the time. Japanese publications indicated that Tanaka attached Motoyoshi Oda to direct the film, rather than waiting for Honda, due to Mori fearing to lose the momentum of the first Godzilla film's success. Film historians Steve Ryfle and David Kalat deduced that Oda was chosen to direct due to his experience with effects-driven films such as Eagle of the Pacific, and his then-latest film The Invisible Avenger. Kalat added that Oda was a director content with accepting B–picture level assignments, stating, "putting such a man in charge of the Godzilla sequel then was a clear signal of intent: This was to be a quickie profit center, not an artistic indulgence."

Screenwriter Takeo Murata originally wanted to show a scene of chaos and looting in the middle of the monster battle, but time and budget limitations forced him to drop this idea. The Dinosaur Book by Edwin H. Colbert was used during the film's conference scene.

=== Special effects ===
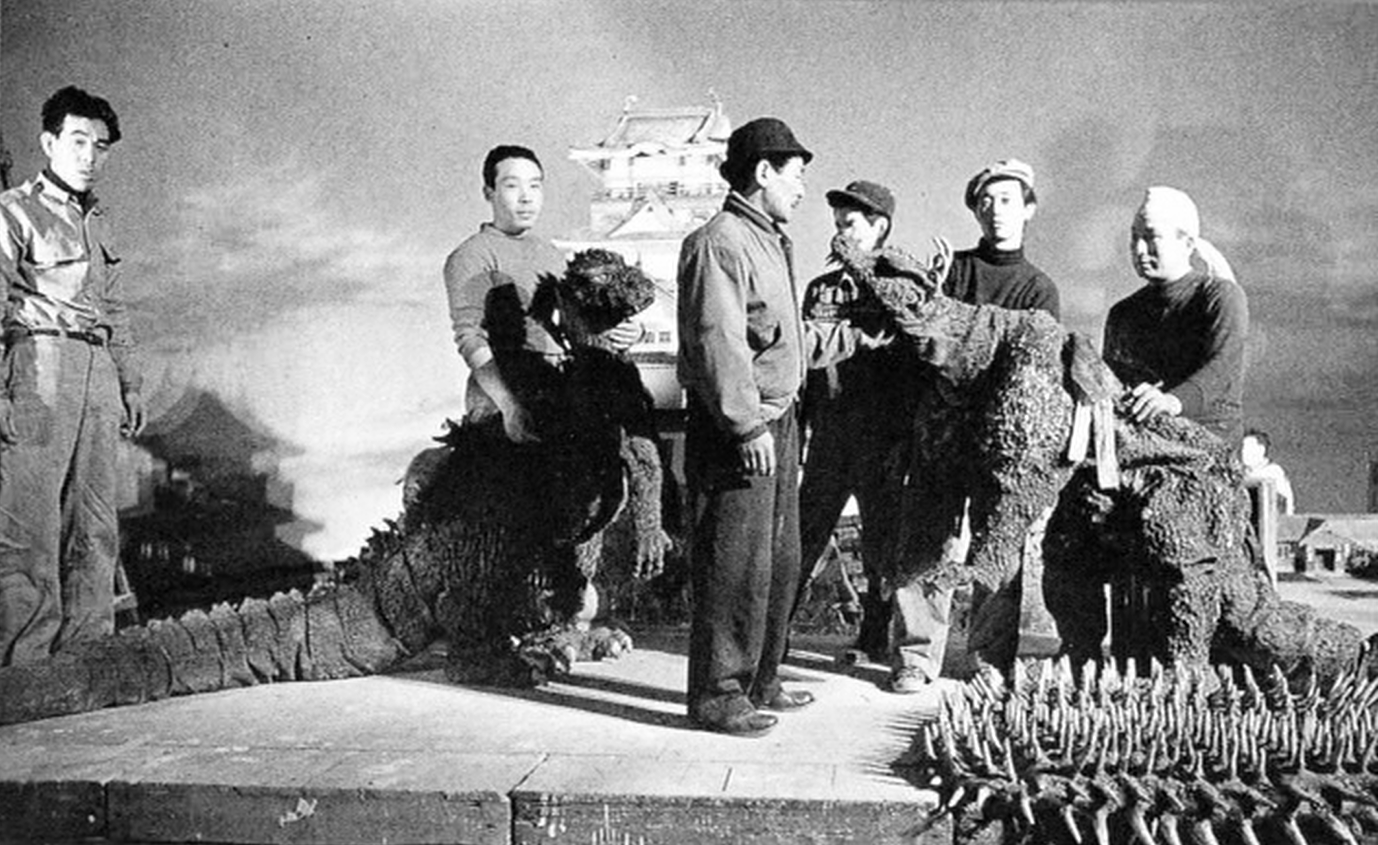
Unlike the previous film, the monster suits for the sequel were produced with lighter materials that enabled suit performers Haruo Nakajima (left; behind the Godzilla suit) and Katsumi Tezuka (far right; behind the Anguirus suit) more flexibility and movement, which resulted in more fluid choreography and performances.

The film's special effects were directed by Eiji Tsuburaya. Some of the effects footage was shot at a slower speed, 18 frames per second. Three cameras were set to capture the effects footage. Two cameras were set at high speed, while the third was inadvertently left at slow speed. Despite the error, Tsuburaya felt the slow speed footage was usable and since then, used different camera speeds for different scenes. Some Japanese publications identified Yoichi Manoda as the cameraman who accidentally left the third camera on slow speed, while others identified Koichi Takano as the culprit. Haruo Nakajima portrayed Godzilla and Katsumi Tezuka portrayed Anguirus, respectively. Nakajima and Tezuka were able to move in the suits more fluidly due to the suits being made from lighter materials, as well as casting them from plaster molds to fit the suit performers' physiques. For Godzilla, the new design was sculpted by Teizo Toshimitsu. The Godzilla suit was constructed with a cloth-base where latex was applied over it. A motor was built into the head to move the eyes and mouth, with the batteries built at the base of the tail. Due to this, Nakajima felt discomfort each time he jumped in the suit. For Anguirus, Tezuka had to crawl on his knees with the bottom of his feet exposed. The effects crew hid this by placing trees, buildings, and other obstacles in the foreground and filming from certain angles that hid the hind legs.

Hand puppets were built for close-up shots. The Godzilla puppet had a spray built in to depict the atomic breath. Some of the monster battles were photographed from low angles to emphasize size and scale. The Osaka miniature set was constructed at Toho's then-new soundstage No. 8, which allowed the effects crew more space to work in. The Osaka castle miniature failed to crumble as planned. Wires were attached to the castle that ran beneath the platform. Due to heavy construction, the model failed to collapse even when the suit performers rammed into it as the crew members pulled the wires. Tsuburaya ordered to "cut" but the crew members did not hear him and the castle model collapsed when camera were not rolling. Due to this, the model had to be partially rebuilt. The ice island battle was partially filmed on an outdoor set. To bury Godzilla in ice, an ice machine was borrowed from the Tokyo skating rink.

For the opening scene, Nakajima and Tezuka were required to be in the suits as they plummeted into the water in order to avoid having the suits float upon impact. Several handlers were on-set to prevent Nakajima and Tezuka from drowning. A Godzilla prop equipped with a wind up motor was built to walk during the ice island scenes, however, the prop malfunctioned and was filmed in a stationary position instead. Real snow was added for the ice island set. Several shots of Godzilla reacting to the ice canyon explosions were filmed outdoors in order to avoid filming the roof of the studio set.

== Release ==
=== Theatrical ===
Godzilla Raids Again was distributed theatrically in Japan by Toho on April 24, 1955. The film generated 8.3 million tickets, less than what the first Godzilla film drew but still considered moderate business. The film drew little enthusiasm from audiences, the press, and Toho staff. Tanaka later admitted that the crew had little time to prepare and hardly considers the film a success. The Japanese version was released to Japanese speaking theaters in the United States prior to the altered American version. The film was Toho's fourth highest-grossing film of the year domestically, and the 10th highest grossing Japanese release domestically.

A re-edited English dubbed version titled Gigantis, the Fire Monster was released theatrically in the United States by Warner Bros. Pictures on June 2, 1959, where it played as a double feature with Teenagers from Outer Space. Some drive-ins paired the film with the English-dubbed version of Toho's Rodan.

=== American version ===
The North American rights to the film were purchased by Harry Rybnick, Richard Kay, Edward Barison, Paul Schreibman, and Edmund Goldman, the same producers who acquired the rights to Godzilla and released it as Godzilla, King of the Monsters!. Instead of dubbing the film, the producers initially intended to produce a new film titled The Volcano Monsters that would have repurposed the monster footage from the Japanese film. The producers announced in Variety that filming was expected to commence on June 17, 1957. Rybnick hired Ib Melchior and Edwin Watson to write the screenplay. However, The Volcano Monsters was cancelled after funding collapsed and the film was dubbed instead. The dub was provided by Ryder Sound Services in New York and featured the voice talents of Keye Luke, Paul Frees, and George Takei.

== Critical response ==
On the review aggregator website Rotten Tomatoes, 64% of 11 critics' reviews are positive, with an average rating of 5.0/10.

From contemporary reviews in the United States, Joe R. Patrick of Des Moines Tribune described the film as "amateurish", finding the acting to be "confined primarily to facial expressions, in tight close-ups" and that the film "suffers most of all from dubbed-in English." The review did praise the animation of the monsters as "at times very good, at other times poor," and concluded that the film was not as well made as its double feature, Rodan. Donald Willis of Variety declared the film as being "inept and tedious" but declared the miniature work as "remarkably good" specifically that scenes of "the dinosaur-like animal crunching his way through houses, traffic and high-tension wires are interesting and exciting."

Film critic Glenn Erickson wrote in DVD Talk that the film was an "underappreciated, action filled sequel to the original," and that although "the human plot [...] is a series of forgettable scenes about two pilots and their girlfriends, material so poorly organized that it's difficult to remember at all," the "design and execution of the monster battles is quite exciting [featuring] wonderfully dynamic battle scenes with excellent optical superimposures." Writing for AllMovie, critic Bruce Eder noted that although "[t]here are interesting elements to this movie, few [...] are explored adequately in the rather slipshod screenplay," that "we never get far enough inside [the characters] to take advantage of the thematic material," and that "the poorer special effects, plus an indifferent music score, made the movie considerably less than its predecessor." A review in TV Guide described the film as a "lukewarm sequel" and "strictly second-rate, lacking both the drama of the first film and the goofy panache of later entries."

Ishirō Honda (director of the previous Godzilla film) noted that reviews for Godzilla Raids Again were more positive compared to the previous film, stating that it was considered "stupid" by the media for a director to add "ideas or themes" into a science fiction film, he commented, "That's why I think that the first Godzilla was only considered a 'weird' movie. That's probably why they liked the second movie much better." Film historian Steve Ryfle noted that some writers felt that while Godzilla (1954) was a metaphor for the Hiroshima bombing, Godzilla Raids Again serves as metaphor for the Nagasaki bombing. Ryfle noted the scene of Hidemi gazing at the flames of Osaka strikes parallels with the imagery of a mushroom cloud.

== Home media ==
=== Japan ===
In 1982, the Japanese version was released on VHS in Japan by Toho. In 1986, Toho released the film on LaserDisc. In 1991, Toho reissued the film on VHS. In 1993, Toho released a new master of the film on LaserDisc. In 2001, Toho released the film on DVD. In 2005, Toho included the film on the Godzilla Final Box DVD Set. In 2014, Toho released the film on Blu-ray.

In 2008, Toho remastered the film in High-definition and premiered it on the Japanese Movie Speciality Channel, along with the rest of the Godzilla films also remastered in HD.

=== United States ===
In 1989, Video Treasures released the American version on EP and LP VHS in the United States and Canada. In 2007, Classic Media and Sony BMG Home Entertainment released both the Japanese and American versions on DVD in the United States and Canada. The special features include an audio commentary by Steve Ryfle, a featurette titled The Art of Suit Acting by Ed Godziszewski and Bill Gudmundson, and a slideshow of the film's theatrical posters. Per Toho's request, the original title card for Gigantis, the Fire Monster was replaced with a new title card sporting the film's official English title.

In 2017, Janus Films and The Criterion Collection acquired the film, as well as other Godzilla titles, to stream on Starz and FilmStruck. In 2019, the Japanese version was included as part of a Blu-ray box set released by The Criterion Collection, which includes all 15 films from the franchise's Shōwa era. In May 2020, the Japanese version became available on HBO Max upon its launch.

== Legacy ==
The film was followed by King Kong vs. Godzilla, released on August 11, 1962. Godzilla Raids Again introduced the monster vs. monster formula that would be become prominent and synonymous with the franchise. After the release of the film, Toho featured Anguirus in various multimedia (see Appearances). Screenwriter Shigeru Kayama would additionally write the novelization for Godzilla Raids Again, which was, along with Kayama's novella for Godzilla (1954), translated to English by Jeffrey Angles and published in 2023.

== See also ==
- List of films featuring dinosaurs
