= Haruo Nakajima =

Japanese actor (1929–2017)

- 中島 春雄
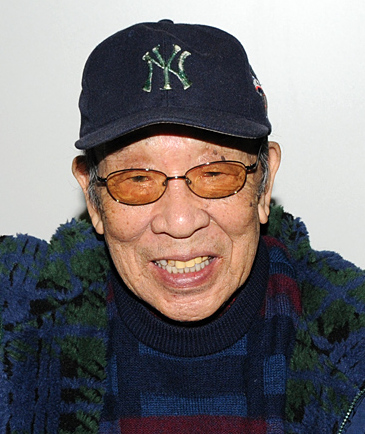
- Nakajima in 2013
- Born: January 1, 1929; Sakata, Yamagata, Empire of Japan
- Died: August 7, 2017 (aged 88); Tokyo, Japan
- Occupations: Actor; suit actor; stunt performer
- Years active: 1949–1973
- Known for: Portraying Godzilla
- Children: Sonoe

Haruo Nakajima (Japanese: 中島 春雄, Hepburn: Nakajima Haruo; January 1, 1929 – August 7, 2017) was a Japanese actor and stuntman. A pioneer of suit acting, he is best known for playing Godzilla in 12 consecutive films, starting from the original Godzilla (1954) until Godzilla vs. Gigan (1972). Nakajima also played various other kaiju in Toho's tokusatsu films, including: Rodan (1956), Mothra (1961) and The War of the Gargantuas (1966) and also appeared in a minor roles in Akira Kurosawa's Seven Samurai (1954), Yojimbo, and Stray Dog (his film debut).

== Career ==
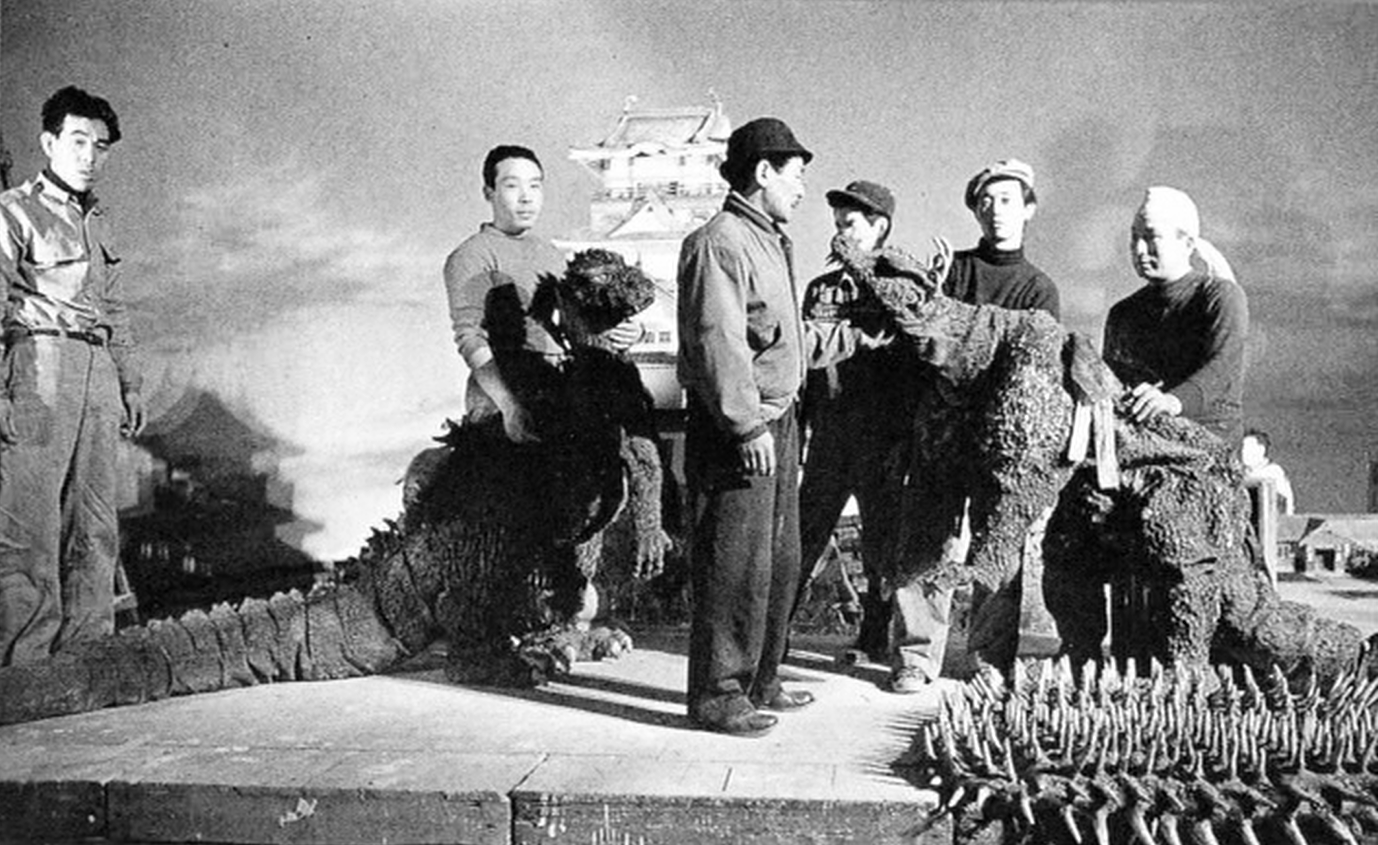
Suit fitting on the set of Godzilla Raids Again (1955), Nakajima (second from left) and Katsumi Tezuka as Anguirus's suit actor on the right. Visible in the background is a destructible scale model of Osaka Castle, scaled to fit the intended height of the two monsters.

Nakajima was born in the city of Sakata in Yamagata Prefecture, Japan, on January 1, 1929.

His first credited role in a motion picture was in the 1952 film Sword for Hire. He began his career as a stunt actor in samurai films and he acted in a small role in the 1954 film Seven Samurai, portraying a bandit slain by master swordsman Kyūzo (Seiji Miyaguchi).

He was considered by many to be the best suit actor in the long history of the Godzilla franchise. At the time, Toho's special effects director, Eiji Tsuburaya considered him completely invaluable, and he was employed to essay the roles of most of the kaiju (Japanese monsters) during his career as a suit actor.

Before shooting began for the first Godzilla movie, in 1954, Nakajima said he spent a week at Tokyo's Ueno Zoo, where he studied the motion of elephants and bears. He said he threw a piece of bread at the bears to see how they moved to catch it. He also studied the heavy, ponderous gait of the elephants. "When elephants walk, they never show the bottom of their feet," he said. When filming began, he said the original suit weighed 100 kilograms and required two men to help him put it on. "How can I act in this thing?" Nakajima said he asked himself. He eventually mastered the suit, and went on to teach the other suit actors who came after him.

After 24 years, Nakajima retired from suit acting upon completion of Godzilla vs. Gigan (1972), when the studio cycled him out of their contract actor system, after it split into several subsidiaries in 1970. He stayed employed by Toho for several years, and was reportedly transferred to a job at its bowling alley, located on the now defunct studio lot.

Beginning in the late 1990s, Nakajima made a series of personal appearances at various Japanese monster-themed conventions. He appeared at the Monsterpalooza convention in Burbank, California in April 2011. His Japanese-language autobiography, 『怪獣人生 元祖ゴジラ俳優・中島春雄』 (Monster Life: Haruo Nakajima, the Original Godzilla Actor), was released in 2010.

== Death ==
On August 7, 2017, several media outlets reported that Nakajima had died, at the age of 88. The following day, on August 8, his daughter Sonoe Nakajima confirmed that he had died of pneumonia. In 2018, asteroid 110408 Nakajima was named in his honour. The film Godzilla: King of the Monsters (2019) was dedicated to his memory.

== Filmography ==
=== Film ===
| Year | Title | Role(s) | Notes | Ref(s) |
|---|---|---|---|---|
| 1949 | Stray Dog | Bar patron | Deleted scene | |
| 1952 | Sword for Hire | | First credited role in a film | |
| 1953 | Eagle of the Pacific | Fighter pilot on fire | | |
| 1954 | Seven Samurai | Bandit | | |
| 1954 | Godzilla | Godzilla | | |
| 1954 | The Invisible Avenger | | | |
| 1955 | Godzilla Raids Again | Godzilla | | |
| 1956 | Rodan | Rodan | | |
| 1957 | The Mysterians | Moguera | | |
| 1958 | The H-Man | Sailor | | |
| 1958 | Varan the Unbelievable | Varan | | |
| 1958 | The Hidden Fortress | | | |
| 1959 | Gigantis, the Fire Monster | Gigantis/Godzilla | | |
| 1960 | The Human Vapor | | | |
| 1961 | The Story of Osaka Castle | | | |
| 1961 | Yojimbo | | | |
| 1961 | Mothra | Mothra (larva) | | |
| 1962 | King Kong vs. Godzilla | Godzilla | | |
| 1963 | Matango | | | |
| 1963 | Atragon | | | |
| 1964 | Mothra vs. Godzilla | Godzilla | | |
| 1964 | Dogora | | | |
| 1964 | Ghidorah, the Three-Headed Monster | Godzilla | | |
| 1965 | Frankenstein vs. Baragon | Baragon | | |
| 1965 | Invasion of Astro-Monster | Godzilla | | |
| 1966 | The War of the Gargantuas | Gaira | | |
| 1966 | Ebirah, Horror of the Deep | Godzilla | | |
| 1967 | King Kong Escapes | King Kong | | |
| 1967 | Son of Godzilla | Godzilla | | |
| 1968 | Destroy All Monsters | Godzilla, Baragon | | |
| 1969 | Latitude Zero | | | |
| 1969 | All Monsters Attack | Godzilla | | |
| 1970 | Space Amoeba | Gezora, Ganimes | | |
| 1971 | Godzilla vs. Hedorah | Godzilla | | |
| 1972 | Godzilla vs. Gigan | Godzilla | | |
| 1973 | Tidal Wave | Chauffeur | | |

=== Television ===
| Year | Title | Notes | Ref(s) |
|---|---|---|---|
| 1966 | Ultra Q | Acting role, Gomess, Pagos | |
| 1966–1967 | Ultraman | Neronga, Gabora, Jirahs, Kemur II, Keylla. | |
| 1967–1968 | Ultraseven | Acting role, U-Tom. | |
| 1970 | Chibira-kun | Gebagoro | |
