= Varan the Unbelievable =

- Theatrical release poster

Japanese name
- Kanji: 大怪獣バラン
Transcriptions
- Revised Hepburn: Daikaijū Baran
- Directed by: Ishirō Honda
- Screenplay by: Shinichi Sekizawa
- Story by: Ken Kuronuma
- Produced by: Tomoyuki Tanaka
- Starring: Kozo Nomura; Ayumi Sonoda; Koreya Senda; Haruo Nakajima
- Cinematography: Hajime Koizumi
- Edited by: Ichiji Taira
- Music by: Akira Ifukube
- Production company: Toho Co., Ltd
- Distributed by: Toho
- Release date: October 14, 1958 (Japan)
- Running time: 87 minutes
- Country: Japan
- Language: Japanese

Varan the Unbelievable (Japanese: 大怪獣バラン, Hepburn: Daikaijū Baran; lit. 'Giant Monster Varan') is a 1958 Japanese kaiju film directed by Ishirō Honda, with special effects by Eiji Tsuburaya. Produced and distributed by Toho Co., Ltd, it stars Kōzō Nomura, Ayumi Sonoda, and Koreya Senda, with Haruo Nakajima as Varan. In the film, a reporter's investigation into two mysterious deaths in Japan's mountains leads to the discovery of a giant lake monster, wrecking its way towards civilization.

In 1957, Toho was approached by AB-PT Pictures to co-produce a new kaiju film for television. It was intended to be a three-part film, each 30 minutes with fade-in/outs for commercial breaks. However, AB-PT collapsed during production and Toho altered the film's status from a television film to a theatrical feature. As a result, the crew faced difficulties and filming lasted 28 days.

The film was theatrically released in Japan on October 14, 1958. A heavily Americanized version, with new footage starring Myron Healey in the lead, was released in the United States on December 12, 1962 by Crown International as Varan the Unbelievable. During its U.S. release, Varan played on a double bill with the 1960 East German-Polish space film First Spaceship on Venus. Varan would later be added into the Godzilla franchise, first appearing in Destroy All Monsters, followed by other Godzilla-related media.

== Plot ==
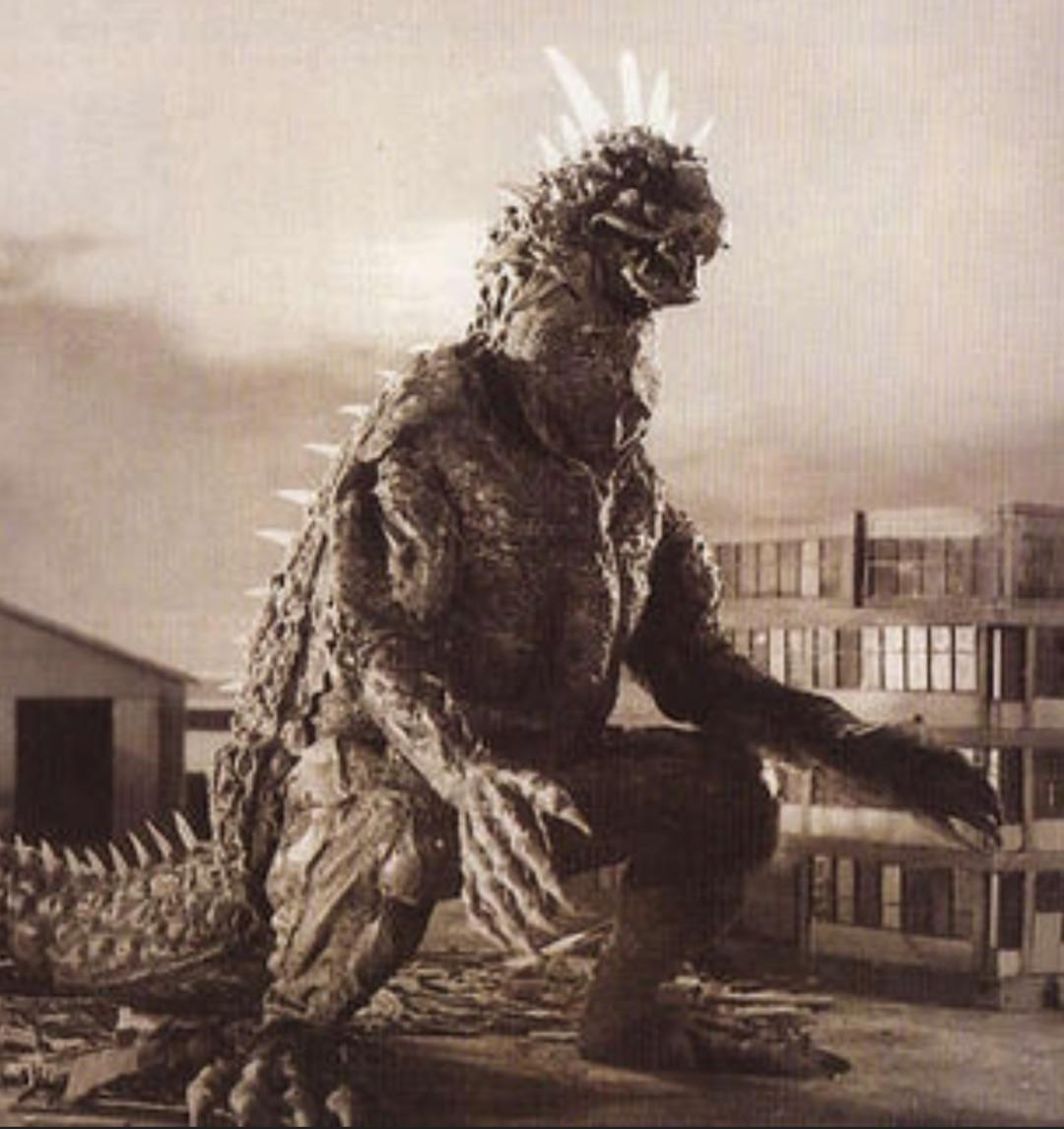
Publicity still of Varan

Two scholars are sent to a region known as the "Tibet of Japan" to study rare butterflies, but they are killed by a landslide triggered by a massive creature. Reporter Yuriko, sister to one of the late scholars, travels to Iwaya Village with scientist Kenji and another colleague to investigate the casualties, after the media pins the blame on a local spirit called “Baradagi”. The trio reach the village but are ordered by its priest to turn back before invoking Baradagi’s wrath. However, against the priest’s demands, the trio chase after a boy pursuing his dog in the forest.

After finding the boy, a giant reptilian monster, whom Kenji identifies as "Varan", surfaces from a nearby lake and attacks the village, crushing the priest in the process. Back in Tokyo, Dr. Sugimoto adds that Varan is a Varanopode, a creature that lived during the Triassic, Jurassic, and Cretaceous periods. Sugimoto is then asked by the Defense Agency to accompany them to the area. Varan is driven out of the lake with chemicals and attacks the military. Kenji and Yuriko are chased by the monster, but take refuge in a cave where Varan attempts to reach them. At Sugimoto’s suggestion, flares are used to distract Varan. However, Varan sprouts wings and flees into the sea.

While the Air Force and Navy search for Varan, Sugimoto joins Dr. Fujimura and other scientists to discuss how to defeat the monster. After attacking a fishing boat, the Air Force and Navy proceed to attack Varan. When Varan heads towards Haneda Airport, the military convince Fujimura to use his new explosive intended for dam construction. As the Defense Force bombards Varan, Kenji drives a truck full of explosives towards the beast. He escapes before the truck detonates beneath Varan but the explosives prove useless. After noticing Varan devouring flares, Sugimoto suggests attaching the explosives onto the flares in the hopes that Varan would swallow them. A helicopter drops the explosive-laced flares into Varan’s mouth, successfully imploding its organs. Varan retreats into the sea, and is killed by the final explosive.

== Cast ==
- Kozo Nomura as Kenji Uozaki
- Ayumi Sonoda as Yuriko Sinjo
- Fumindo Matsuo as Motohiko Horiguchi
- Koreya Senda as Dr. Sugimoto
- Akihiko Hirata as Dr. Fujimura
- Fuyuki Murakami as Dr. Umajima
- Akira Sera as Village Priest
- Akio Kusama as Officer Kusama
- Yoshio Tsuchiya as Officer Katsumoto
- Minosuke Yamada as Secretary of Defense
- Hisaya Ito as Ichiro Shinjo
- Yoshifumi Tajima as Captain
- Takashi Ito as Village Boy
- Haruo Nakajima as Varan

American version

- Myron Healey as Commander James Bradley
- Tsuruko Kobayashi as Anna Bradley
- Clifford Kawada as Captain Kishi
- Derick Shimatsu as Matsu

Cast taken from A Critical History and Filmography of Toho's Godzilla Series.

== Production ==
=== Crew ===
- Ishirō Honda – director
- Eiji Tsuburaya – special effects director
- Kōji Kajita – assistant director
- Kiyoshi Suzuki – art director
- Akira Watanabe – special effects art director
- Hiroshi Mukoyama – optical effects
- Jerry A. Baerwitz – director, producer (American footage)
- Jack Marquette – cinematographer (American footage)
- Sid Harris – writer (American version)

Personnel taken from A Critical History and Filmography of Toho's Godzilla Series.

=== Development ===
This change was forced on us. We were shooting things so that they looked big and powerful on the small screen, but suddenly we had to take the same footage and try to make the same impression for the big screen. It just doesn't work that way. And on top of that, we had been shooting based on the premise of making it in three episodes. Now we had to...somehow combine it all into one continuous story. Of course it did not work. We had a very hard time adjusting it. The desk-side planners just did not understand how the filming side worked.

— Honda on Toho changing the film's production from a television project to a theatrical feature.

In 1957, AB-PT Pictures approached Toho to co-produce a new kaiju film for television. At AB-PT's request, Toho planned for Varan the Unbelievable to be filmed in three parts, 30 minutes each, and with fade ins/outs for commercial breaks. Tanaka purposely gave the film a low budget and low production values to ensure a profit from the ABC sale. The film was intended to be a Japanese/American co-production, however, AB-PT collapsed during production.

=== Writing ===
Kuronuma was approached by Tanaka to write a new kaiju film, stating, "Rodan had arrived in the US, and a request for another came from [America] to Toho. Tanaka approached me, asking me to come up with something, anything." Sekizawa was tasked with writing the screenplay and was told to keep it "basic and simple." Sekizawa's early drafts used the subtitle "Monster of the East." A scene that Sekizawa wrote featured children pretending to be Varan but was cut from the film.

=== Filming ===
Filming began in July 1958 in black-and-white and in 1.33:1 aspect ratio. However, after AB-PT shut down, Toho changed the film's status in the middle of production from a television project into a theatrical feature. Honda noted that they couldn't start over and had to resort to "blowing up" the film to widescreen format, a method that was used for the Japanese release of Godzilla, King of the Monsters! Toho proceeded to market the film as a 2.35:1 Toho Pan Scope release. Varan suit actor Haruo Nakajima suffered burns while filming the climax scene. The crew rented a cheap soundstage and open set when certain scenes could not be filmed at Toho. Evacuation scenes were filmed on the Toho lot, with some offices and sound-stages visible onscreen. Filming lasted 28 days and wrapped in mid-August. Due to the film intended for television, Tsuburaya cut corners on the effects and recycled footage from Godzilla and Godzilla Raids Again.

== American version ==
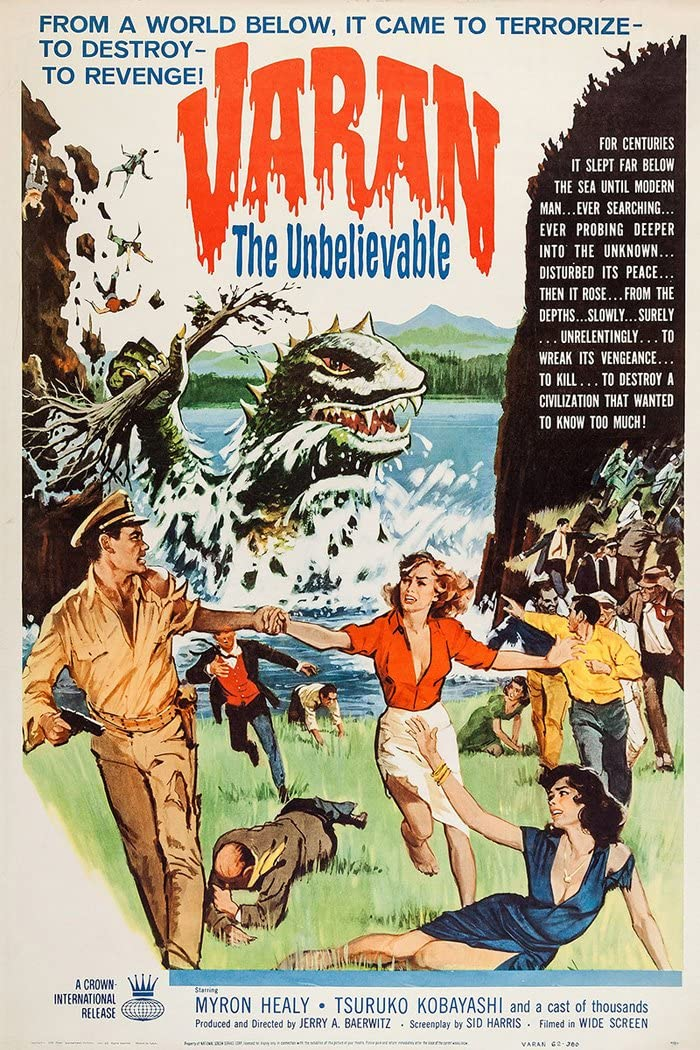
The U.S. release of Varan the Unbelievable

The film was heavily localized for its America release. Produced by Jerry A. Baerwitz, Baerwitz also directed new footage with Myron Healey interacting with Japanese-American actors. A new story was written by Sid Harris which featured an American military scientist stationed in Japan conducting a de-salinization experiment on the lake where Varan dwells. The American version only features 15 minutes of the original Japanese footage and does not credit any of the Toho crew. Ifukube's music was replaced with cues from The Amazing Colossal Man.

The American version runs at 70 minutes and was theatrically released on December 12, 1962 by Crown International, under the title Varan the Unbelievable. It played on a double-bill with First Spaceship on Venus. Toho featured the American version in their 1962 and 1963 English sales catalogues. Honda was unaware until the 1980s of the American version's existence. Film historian Stuart Galbraith IV claimed that an English dubbed version was produced by Toho; however, evidence of such version has never surfaced.

== Release ==
Varan the Unbelievable was distributed theatrically in Japan by Toho on October 14, 1958 Conflicting sources report that Toho completed a theatrical version and an export television version. These reports claim that Ifukube recorded a separate score between August 27 and 29 for the television version and a test print with three reels was shipped to Toho International in Los Angeles.

=== Reception ===
In a contemporary review, Variety referred to the film as an "uninspired monster meller for saturation supporting niches" after Godzilla, Gorgo, and Dinosaurus! The review was of the American version of the film, where they stated that "Neither Harris' scenario nor Baewritz's direction of it can sustain interest". A reviewer for Tokyo Weekly commented, "Varan attacks Haneda Airport, but it reminds me of the conclusion of any other old Godzilla. There's nothing new. It's really about all they can do with a monster movie." For the American version, author David Kalat noted that Bradley sees himself as a misunderstood figure who has lent his time and efforts to helping a foreign country, only to be attacked by the people he's trying to help. Kalat alluded this to the Occupation of Japan and noted how the Japan film industry considered it taboo to touch the subject, concluding that the American version "deserves a passing nod for its unusually politicized content."

Years later, Honda admitted to being disappointed with the film, stating, "This is not a work I am happy with. If we could have restarted from the beginning, scenes such as those with the Self-Defense Forces might have been more grand. Everything was pretty much shot on [a small] set, with maybe a tiny bit of location filming. The entire film would have turned out a little [better]."

=== Home media ===
Varan the Unbelievable was one of Toho's last films released on VHS in the 1980s. Film historians Steve Ryfle and Ed Godziszewski deduced that Toho may have withheld on releasing the film on VHS to possibly avoid potential controversy due to the film briefly alluding to Burakumin. Scenes referring to the village as "unexplored and secluded" (code words for buraku enclave) were cut from early home video releases but restored on the DVD release. Tokyo Shock released the original Japanese version on DVD in the United States on May 10, 2005 under the title Varan the Unbelievable.
