= Ken Kuronuma =

Japanese writer

- 黒沼健
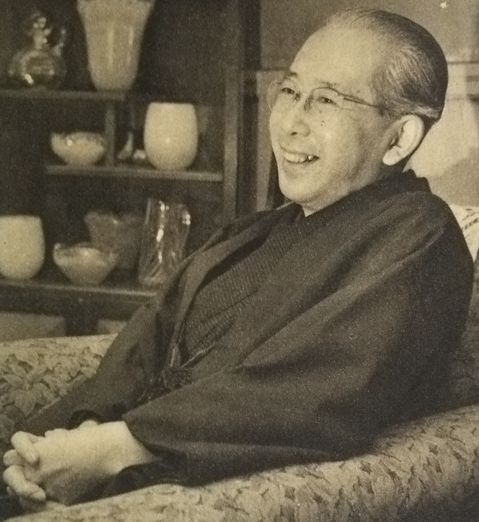
- Born: Michio Soda; May 1, 1902; Yokohama, Kanagawa, Japan
- Died: July 5, 1985 (aged 83)
- Occupations: Writer, novelist
- Writing career
- Years active: 1956 - 1976
- Notable works: Rodan; Varan the Unbelievable

Ken Kuronuma (Japanese: 黒沼健, Hepburn: Kuronuma Ken; 1 May 1902 – 5 July 1985) was the pen-name of novelist, science fiction, and mystery writer in Shōwa period Japan. His real name was Michio Soda (左右田道雄, Sōda Michio). His father, Sōda Kiichirō (左右田喜一郎), was an economist and a banker.

Kuronuma was the writer of the Kaiju classic Giant Monster of the Sky: Rodan (known in Japan as Sora no Daikaijū: Radon (空の大怪獣 ラドン, Sora no Daikaijū Radon)), a 1956 tokusatsu film produced by Tōhō Studios. The film followed in the footsteps of Godzilla and was also popular in the United States.

He followed on the success of Rodan with Varan the Unbelievable in 1958. It proved to be one of the least popular of the Tōhō movies of all time, and nearly destroyed his career.

Kuronuma turned his attention to television drama, writing scripts for one of Japan's first science fiction series, Undersea Man 8823 (海底人8823, Kaiteijin 8823), which ran for 26 episodes: from 3 January 1960 to 28 June 1960. In addition to writing for the series, he also helped to compose the music.

== See also ==
- List of Japanese authors
