= Eagle of the Pacific =

1953 film directed by Ishirō Honda

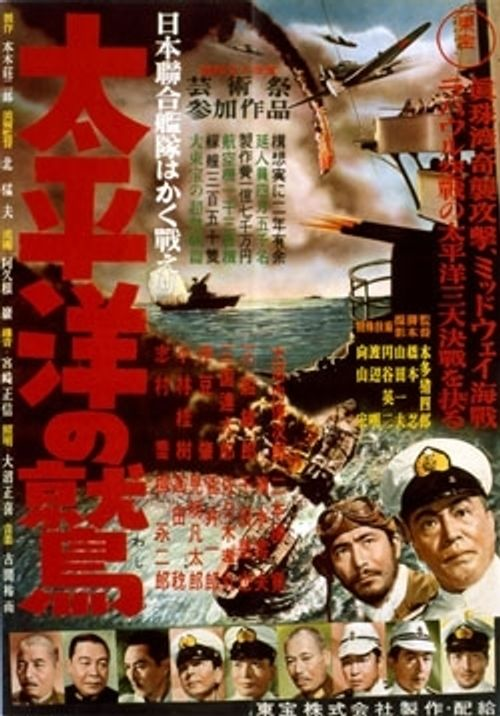
- Theatrical release poster
- Directed by: Ishirō Honda
- Written by: Shinobu Hashimoto
- Produced by: Sojiro Motoki
- Starring: Denjirō Ōkōchi
- Cinematography: Kazuo Yamada
- Edited by: Koichi Iwashita
- Music by: Yūji Koseki
- Distributed by: Toho
- Release date: October 21, 1953 (Japan)
- Running time: 119 minutes
- Country: Japan
- Language: Japanese
- Budget: ¥170 million
- Box office: ¥163.180 million

Eagle of the Pacific (太平洋の鷲, Taiheiyo no washi), also known as Operation Kamikaze, is a 1953 Japanese epic war film directed by Ishirō Honda, with special effects by Eiji Tsuburaya. The film dramatizes the start of Japan's military action in World War II, with an emphasis on the role of Isoroku Yamamoto.

== Cast ==
- Denjirō Ōkōchi as Admiral Isoroku Yamamoto
- Hiroshi Nihonyanagi as Commander Furukawa
- Eijirô Yanagi as Admiral Mitsumasa Yonai
- Minoru Takada as Prince Fumimaro Konoe
- Masao Shimizu as Commander Kashima
- Ichiro Sugai as Admiral Koshirō Oikawa
- Toshiro Mifune as First Lieutenant Tomonaga
- Takashi Shimura as Staff Officer of the Army
- Bontaro Miake as Commander of the Task Force
- Haruo Nakajima as Pilot in Flaming Zero
- Sachio Sakai
- Katsumi Tezuka
- Shin Otomo

== Production ==
I hate war. This film is my tribute, a wish that the Japanese people will never experience this tragedy ever again.

— A statement from Ishirō Honda regarding the film.

Toho intended Eagle of the Pacific to be an ambitious, Hollywood-style film. The studio used storyboarding to plan the visual effects sequences, a technique they would repeat on Godzilla.

Stock footage was utilized extensively in Eagle of the Pacific; some sources claim that producer Sojiro Motoki secured approval for the film by offering to reuse action sequences from The War at Sea from Hawaii to Malaya. Thus, special effects director Eiji Tsuburaya's return to Toho was not a lavish affair. It is mostly rehashed footage augmented by a few new effects, and he only had a small crew. Many newspaper critics weren't fooled by Toho's trick photography, citing stock footage as evidence.

== Reception ==
Eagle of the Pacific grossed 163 million yen, the third highest total for a Japanese film in 1953.

== Release ==
The film was released on DVD in Japan in 2005.
