= Gorath =

1962 film

- Theatrical release poster
- Directed by: Ishirō Honda
- Screenplay by: Takeshi Kimura
- Based on: An idea by Jojiro Okami
- Produced by: Tomoyuki Tanaka
- Starring: Ryō Ikebe; Yumi Shirakawa; Takashi Shimura; Kumi Mizuno
- Cinematography: Hajime Koizumi
- Edited by: Reiko Kaneko
- Music by: Kan Ishii
- Production company: Toho
- Distributed by: Toho
- Release date: 21 March 1962 (Japan)
- Running time: 88 minutes
- Country: Japan
- Languages: Japanese; English
- Budget: ¥126–380 million (Note: Steve Ryfle and Ed Godziszewski reported the budget to be ¥126 million (approximately $350,000), but noted "it looks more expensive". Koichi Kawakita stated the budget to be ¥380 million.)

Gorath (妖星ゴラス, Yōsei Gorasu; lit. 'Ominous Star Gorath') is a 1962 Japanese epic science fiction disaster film directed by Ishirō Honda, with special effects by Eiji Tsuburaya. Based on an idea by Jojiro Okami, the film is about mankind's efforts to move Earth out of its orbit to prevent it from colliding with a runaway white dwarf star. The film was extensively edited for its American release.

== Plot ==
On September 29, 1979, the Interstellar Exploration Agency launches a Japanese rocket ship, the JX-1 Hawk, into space on a nine-month journey to investigate Saturn. At its conclusion, however, the crew is given a new mission after scientists discover that a runaway star, which the International Astronomical Union nicknamed "Gorath", is somehow running amok. Upon encountering and while investigating Gorath's rapid movement through the Solar System, the JX-1 Hawk crew discover that it is smaller than Earth, yet has 6,000 times its gravity. They manage to transmit their data back to Earth before an enormous gravity well destroys the ship, killing the crew.

A month later in 1980, astronomers and astrophysicists throughout the international community announce that Gorath will collide with the Earth in two years' time. At the United Nations, a gathering of Earth's top scientists attempts to resolve the situation by pooling together large amounts of technical advancements they made in the past two decades. After a debriefing, the scientific community reveals the South Pole Operation, which involves a base in Antarctica designed to house a large international team of engineers and scientists and the construction of huge "mega-thrusters" which will propel the Earth out of Gorath's path within 100 days and move Earth back once the danger has passed. The U.N. approves and sends the prototype sub-light spacecraft JX-2 Eagle into space to obtain further data on Gorath.

Construction on the South Pole Operation base goes underway as ships and helicopters from several nations bring in building materials and powerful, mobile heat-generating devices known as atomic burrowers are quickly cobbled together to assist in creating the caverns required to house the mega-thrusters. Meanwhile, the JX-2 Eagle crew succeeds in its mission, learning that Gorath is absorbing space debris within its gravity well to continuously add to its mass, and transmit the data to U.N. space stations. On Earth, the mega-thrusters are activated for a test run while citizens from around the world watch on a live broadcast. As the Earth gently moves, the South Pole Operation is hailed as a success. The JX-2 Eagle and space stations learn of this development and are ordered to return to deny Gorath more mass.

However, the heat generated by the mega-thrusters causes a giant, walrus-like monster later named "Maguma" to emerge from the tundra and attack the South Pole Operation base in response to their intrusion. In response, a small VTOL aircraft is equipped with a powerful laser to stop Maguma. Determined to do so without killing the monster, the pilot uses the laser to create an avalanche and bury it. However, Maguma easily escapes and resumes its attack, leaving the crew with little choice but to kill it. As Gorath absorbs Saturn's rings, the JX-2 Eagle crew successfully returns to Earth.

As the enormous celestial body becomes visible to the naked eye, its tidal interaction with Earth wreaks havoc on coastal areas and a state of emergency is declared. Gorath absorbs and obliterates the Moon. It also floods Tokyo and the mega-thrusters with the rising tides and causes an earthquake that destroys the JX-2 Eagle and the Interstellar Exploration Agency's Mount Fuji facility. In spite of these disasters, the plan to move Earth out of Gorath's path is successful, and the planet escapes destruction.

== Cast ==
- Ryō Ikebe as Dr. Tazawa - Astrophysicist
- Yumi Shirakawa as Tomoko Sonoda
- Akira Kubo as Tatsuma Kanai - Cadet Astronaut
- Kumi Mizuno as Takiko Nomura
- Hiroshi Tachikawa as Wakabayashi - Pilot of Ōtori
- Akihiko Hirata as Endō - Captain of Ōtori
- Kenji Sahara as Saiki - Vice Captain of Ōtori
- Jun Tazaki as Raizō Sonoda - Tomoko's Father
- Ken Uehara as Dr. Kōno - Astrophysicist
- Takashi Shimura as Kensuke Sonoda - Paleontologist
- Seizaburō Kawazu as Tada - Minister of Finance
- Kō Mishima as Sanada - Engineer
- Sachio Sakai as Physician
- Takamaru Sasaki as Prime Minister Seki
- Kō Nishimura as Murata - Secretary of Space
- Fumio Sakashita as Hayao Sonoda - Tomoko's Brother
- Katsumi Tezuka as Maguma

== Release ==
Gorath was released theatrically in Japan on 21 March 1962, where it was distributed by Toho. It was released in the United States as Gorath by Brenco Pictures through Allied Artists Pictures with an English-language dub on 15 May 1964 that removed all scenes involving Maguma, which were deemed too silly to include. The film was double-billed in the United States with The Human Vapor.

== Reception ==
In a contemporary review, ""Whit." of Variety declared it as "generally a first-class endeavour" noting that "particular credit goes to Eiji Tsuburaya for his special effects" and the acting by Ryō Ikebe was a highlight of the cast. Another review from "Whit." from the same issue of Variety found its double feature The Human Vapor the more interesting film plotwise.

== See also ==
- Passage to Pluto, a 1973 novel by Hugh Walters which also involves an ultra-dense wandering planet
- Melancholia, a 2011 drama film directed by Lars von Trier set during the impending collision of Earth with a rogue planet
- The Wandering Earth, a 2019 film which also involves a man-made change of Earth's course.
- Nibiru cataclysm
- Warning from Space, a 1956 film with potential influences on Gorath and Invasion of Astro-Monster.
