= Rodan (film) =

1956 film by Ishirō Honda

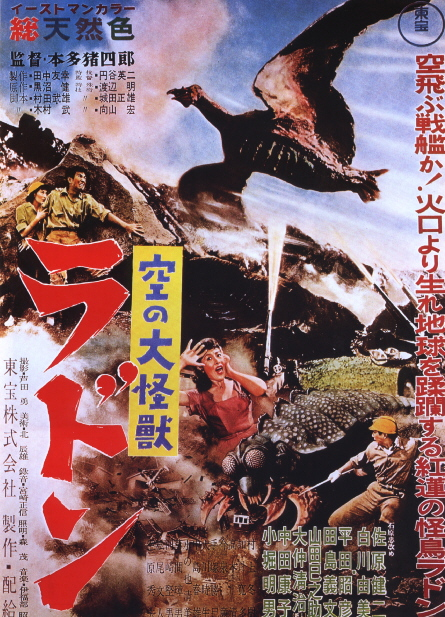
- Theatrical release poster

Japanese name
- Kanji: 空の大怪獣 ラドン
Transcriptions
- Revised Hepburn: Sora no Daikaijū Radon
- Directed by: Ishirō Honda
- Screenplay by: Takeshi Kimura; Takeo Murata
- Story by: Ken Kuronuma
- Produced by: Tomoyuki Tanaka
- Starring: Kenji Sahara; Yumi Shirakawa
- Cinematography: Isamu Ashida
- Edited by: Kôichi Iwashita; Robert S. Eisen
- Music by: Akira Ifukube
- Production company: Toho
- Distributed by: Toho
- Release date: December 26, 1956
- Running time: 82 minutes
- Country: Japan
- Language: Japanese
- Budget: $277,777 (production) ¥200 million (overall)
- Box office: $397,000 (Japan) >$1 million (U.S.) $2,500,000 (outside Japan)

Rodan (Japanese: 空の大怪獣 ラドン, Hepburn: Sora no Daikaijū Radon; lit. 'Giant Monster of the Sky Radon') is a 1956 Japanese kaiju film directed by Ishirō Honda, with special effects by Eiji Tsuburaya. Produced and distributed by Toho Studios, it is the debut film of the titular monster Rodan, Toho's first kaiju film to be shot in color, and one of several giant monster films that found an audience outside Japan. Rodan would become a staple monster later crossing over into the Godzilla franchise. The film stars Kenji Sahara and Yumi Shirakawa. Rodan premiered in Japan on December 26, 1956, and was released in the United States in August 1957.

== Plot ==
In the mining village of Kitamatsu, near the foothills of Mount Aso on Kyushu, miners Goro and Yoshi enter a mine to start their shift, before the shaft floods. Shigeru Kawamura, a tunneling and safety engineer there, later enters the mine and discovers Yoshi's lacerated corpse.

Above ground, a doctor examines Yoshi, who died from deep gashes caused by a sharp object. Two miners and a policeman are later slain in the flooded shaft. That night, Shigeru and his fiancée Kiyo are attacked by a giant larval insect at Kiyo's home.

The police start hunting the creature, which kills two officers before escaping into the mine. The police and Shigeru notice that the officers' wounds match those of the murdered miners. Shigeru, accompanied by police and soldiers, heads into the mine, and discovers Goro's butchered body and is chased by the insect monster. Shigeru crushes the creature with runaway mine carts. However, after another monster appears, the tunnel collapses in on itself trapping Shigeru in the mine.

The next day, Dr. Kashiwagi identifies the giant insect as the Meganulon, an ancient species of dragonfly nymph that was awoken by the mining operation. An earthquake strikes the area, and rumors begin to circulate that Mount Aso might be on the verge of an eruption. Heading to the volcano to investigate the damage caused by the earthquake, the police discover that the only road to the mines has collapsed. They then also find Shigeru wandering around the epicenter, injured and suffering from amnesia.

Miles away, an air base receives an alert from a JASDF fighter pilot. The pilot reports an unidentified flying object moving at supersonic speeds near Mount Aso. The pilot is ordered to pursue the jet, but the UFO changes course abruptly and overflies the aircraft, destroying it. The base later learns that a British airliner was downed by an aerial object resembling the supersonic UFO. More incidents are reported from China, Okinawa, and the Philippines of aerial supersonic objects.

Amid constant news reports of these attacks, a newly married couple disappears around Mount Aso, along with several cattle. When the authorities develop the film from the newlyweds' camera, they discover a photograph of what appears to be a gigantic wing. Ruling out the possibility of aircraft, authorities match the photo with a drawing of a prehistoric Pteranodon and surmise that the UFO is a living being.

Meanwhile, Shigeru's treatment progresses slowly. One day, in Shigeru's hospital room, Kiyo shows him the eggs that her pet birds have lain. As one of the eggs hatches, Shigeru, disturbed by the sight, regains his memory. He recalls that he woke up deep within the mine after the cave-in, and found himself surrounded by Meganulon. In the cave was a gigantic egg, from which Shigeru watched a massive bird creature emerge.

After descending into the cave with police and scientists, Shigeru finds a piece of the egg, which is taken to the surface for analysis. Dr. Kashiwagi examines the fragment in his lab and calls a meeting with townspeople and members of the Japanese Self-Defence Force. Kashiwagi says that the object flying at supersonic speeds is a pterosaur he has dubbed Rodan. Kashiwagi theorizes that nuclear bomb testing may have been the cause of Rodan's awakening.

Rodan emerges from the ground near Mount Aso, takes flight, and heads for Kyushu, with a squadron of the JSDF pursuing it. After one of its wings is injured, Rodan flies to Fukuoka, where the sonic waves and windstorms from its wings lay waste to the city. The JSDF later reports that a second Rodan was spotted heading towards the city. After leveling the city and leaving the remaining buildings in flames, the two Rodans fly to Mount Aso. The JSDF formulate a plan to have the military fire at the base of Mount Aso, burying the Rodans alive. Shigeru retreats with Kiyo to safety, and the military begins its attack, triggering a volcanic eruption. The first Rodan's wing is damaged by the eruption; it falls towards a lava flow and begins to burn alive. Unwilling to live without its mate, the second Rodan dives into the eruption and burns to death.

== Cast ==
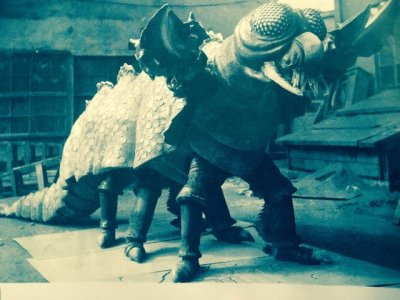
Actors that were in the Meganulon suit during production of Rodan

- Kenji Sahara as Shigeru Kawamura, Mining Engineer
- Yumi Shirakawa as Kiyo, Goro's Sister
- Akihiko Hirata as Kyoichiro Kashiwagi, Doctor of Paleontology
- Akio Kobori as Nishimura, Police Detective
- Yasuko Nakata as Honeymooning Wife
- Minosuke Yamada as Oseki, Mining Chief
- Yoshifumi Tajima as Izeki, reporter of Seibu Nippou
- Kiyoharu Onaka as Honeymooning Husband, Sunagawa's friend
- Yasuhisa Tsutsumi as Imamura, F-86F Pilot
- Ichirô Chiba as Chief of Police
- Mike Daneen as U.S. Army Teletype Operator, Okinawa
- Tazue Ichimanji as Haru, Kiyo's neighbor
- Saburo Iketani as Radio News Anchor
- Saburô Kadowaki as Lab Technician, Seismic Research Institute
- Tateo Kawasaki as Tsune, Miner
- Kanta Kisaragi as Wasteman
- Haruo Nakajima as Rodan, Meganulon
- Katsumi Tezuka, Shoichi Hirose and Tokio Okawa as Meganulon

== Production ==
=== Writing ===
Veteran writer Ken Kuronuma, who wrote the original story for this film, was inspired by an incident in Kentucky in 1948, when Captain Thomas F. Mantell, a pilot for the Kentucky Air National Guard, died in a crash while allegedly pursuing a UFO.

=== Filming ===
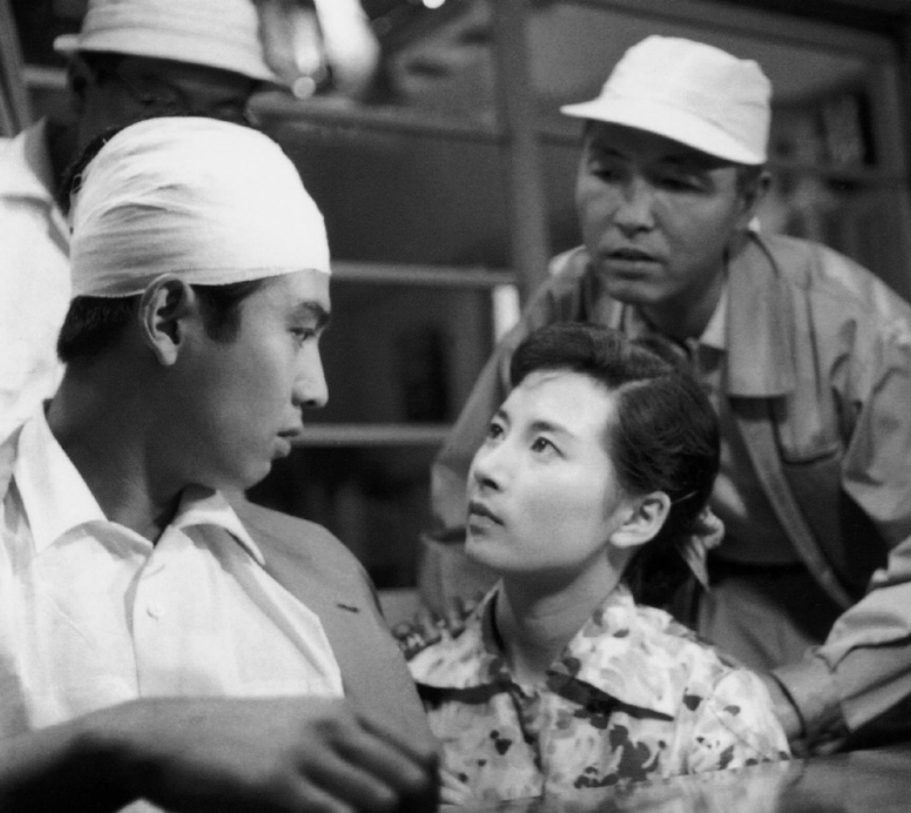
Ishirō Honda gives instructions to Kenji Sahara and Yumi Shirakawa, during filming.

While shooting the scene in which Rodan flies over the Saikai Bridge (connecting Saikai and Sasebo in Nagasaki Prefecture), the pulley from which Haruo Nakajima was suspended broke. He fell from a height of twenty-five feet, but the wings and the water, which was about one and a half feet deep, absorbed much of the impact.

=== English dubbing ===
The main narration provided by the character Shigeru was dubbed over by actor Keye Luke, with additional voices provided by George Takei (who went on to perform similar voice work for another Kaiju film, the 1959 release Gigantis, the Fire Monster) and veteran actor Paul Frees. Voice over dubbing was done at Metro-Goldwyn-Mayer Studio in Culver City, CA. Each of the 4 voice over actors dubbed 8 or 9 different voices for the film.

== Release ==
=== Theatrical and box office ===
Rodan was re-released theatrically in Japan on November 28, 1982, as part of Toho's 50th anniversary. Rodan grossed an estimated $450,000 to $500,000 during its opening weekend at 79 theaters in the New York City metropolitan area. Several theatrical circuits, including RKO, announced that the film broke the box office records for a science-fiction film.

=== American version ===
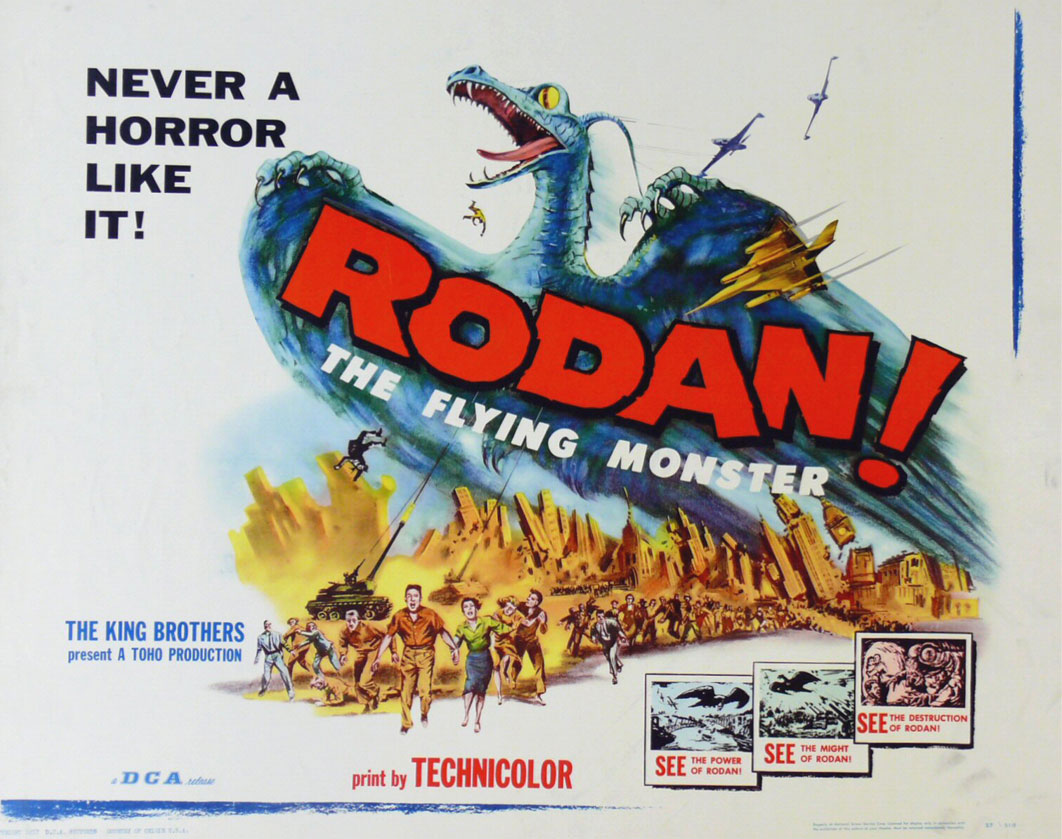
The original American poster for Rodan

The King Brothers Productions 1957 theatrical release of Rodan was quite successful in its first run in the United States. It was the first Japanese film to receive general release on the West Coast that made a strong showing at the box-office. It later received the largest TV advertising campaign given to a film up to that date on New York's NBC flagship station WRCA-TV, where a series of promotional commercials, running 10 to 60 seconds, were shown for a week before the film's appearance. Television promotion included a contest to copy Rodan's outline using a piece of paper held over the screen while the outline was shown on the screen for a brief time each day.

=== Critical response ===
On review aggregator Rotten Tomatoes, approval rating of 75% based on 12 reviews, with an average rating of 5.9/10.

Writing for Famous Monsters of Filmland, Joe Dante included the film in his list of the 50 worst horror films in 1962, declaring it "another routine (Japanese) prehistoric-monster-on-the-loose melodrama" which was "inferior to many U.S. productions." Turner Classic Movies's critic Richard Harland Smith described and wrote the film as "echo[ing] the somber tone of Godzilla, [but] leavening the mixture with a dash of compassion for the behemoths making hash of Japanese real estate values." In his AllMovie review, critic Craig Butler wrote that Rodan was "well worth watching" and that "[a]ficionados of this genre will find a lot to like" in the film. Author and film critic Glenn Erickson wrote that the film was "an adolescent cousin of Romeo and Juliet" and "[a]lthough far from perfect, Rodan has the innocence and wonder of early 50s Sci-Fi."

=== Home media ===
Vestron Video released the U.S. version of Rodan on all available home media formats (VHS, Betamax, CED, and LaserDisc) simultaneously in mid-1983.

In September 2008, the Japanese and American versions of the film were released on DVD by Classic Media in the United States and Canada; this DVD bundled Rodan with The War of the Gargantuas, which also featured that film's Japanese and American versions.
