= Chibi Godzilla Raids Again =

Japanese anime television series

ちびゴジラの逆襲 (Chibi Gojira no Gyakushū)
- Genre: Kaiju, manzai
- Created by: Toho (Godzilla), Chiharu Sakazaki (Chibi Godzilla)
- Anime television series
- Directed by: Taketo Shinkai
- Produced by: Go Miyazaki
- Written by: Taketo Shinkai
- Studio: Pie in the Sky
- Original network: TV Tokyo
- Original run: April 1, 2023 – present
- Episodes: 121
- icon

Chibi Godzilla Raids Again (Japanese: ちびゴジラの逆襲, Hepburn: Chibi Gojira no Gyakushū; lit. Dwarf Godzilla's counterattack) is a Japanese short anime television series in Toho's Godzilla franchise. Produced by Pie in the Sky and Toho, the first season aired on TV Tokyo and on YouTube as a web series from April to June 2023 while the second season aired for one year from April 2024 to March 2025. The third season aired from July 2, 2025, to March 25, 2026. The fourth season premiered on April 1, 2026. The show takes place on Monster Island, which is inhabited by small chibi-style kaiju from the franchise.

== Characters ==
Per Comic Natalie (2023) and Hodgkins (2023), except where noted:

=== Main (Toho Big Five) ===
Chibi Godzilla (ちびゴジラ, Chibi Gojira)
Voiced by: Jun Fukuyama (Japanese), Jacob Takanashi (English)
It is an irradiated amphibious dinosaurian creature and an offspring of a colossal Godzilla who hopes to grow up to be recognized by it. A dweller of Monster Island who is acquainted with its inhabitants, it and the newcomer Chibi Mechagodzilla make a duo exploring the area's quirks. It is based on Godzilla Junior from Heisei-era Godzilla film series and its second form is based on Godzilla's second form from Shin Godzilla.
Chibi Mechagodzilla (ちびメカゴジラ, Chibi Mekagojira)
Voiced by: Yoshitsugu Matsuoka (Japanese), Matthew Masaru Barron (English)
It is an amnesiac robot who was built by humans and gets stranded on Monster Island, where it traverses through the landscape with Chibi Godzilla to learn about its inhabitants. It has a serious nature, exemplified by often verbally questioning the meaning behind illogical or extraordinary behavior from Chibi Godzilla or hit friends. In Season 2, it is reveals that it was originally sent to destroy Monster Island along with Chibi Gigan.
Chibi Ghidorah (ちびギドラ, Chibi Gidora)
Voiced by: Takuya Eguchi (Japanese), Ryan Drees (English)
It is a three-headed dragon, each of its heads has its own personality that often contradicts the other. Its appearance and personality are based on King Ghidorah from Godzilla: King of the Monsters.
Chibi Mothra (ちびモスラ, Chibi Mosura)
Voiced by: Rie Takahashi, Jenny Silver (English)
She is a divine moth who is shy and becomes lethal when crying. She can communicate telepathically with the Shobijin. It is revealed that she is secretly an otaku in season 2.
Chibi Rodan (ちびラドン, Chibi Radon)
Voiced by: Hiro Shimono (Japanese), Michael Turpin (English)
It is a self-centered irradiated Pteranodon who is also insecure and faints every time he is ridiculed.

=== Supporting ===
Chibi Anguirus (ちびアンギラス, Chibi Angirasu)
It is a irradiated Ankylosaur whose voice has broken and developed into unintelligible roars.
The Shobijin (小美人, Shōbijin)
Voiced by: Reina Ueda (older), Akari Kitō (younger)
They are a pair of human twin sisters and priestesses who can serve as telepathic interpreters for Chibi Mothra. Their appearance are based on the Shobijin from original 1961 Mothra film. Ueda, who voices older sister, previously voiced Maina from Godzilla: City on the Edge of Battle and Godzilla: The Planet Eater in Godzilla anime trilogy.
Chibi Biollante (ちびビオランテ, Chibi Biorante)
Voiced by: Miyuki Sawashiro
It is a mutant plant monster and the owner of a bar. It often speaks in literary words. Its appearance is based on Plant Beast Biollante from Godzilla vs. Biollante.
Chibi Hedorah (ちびヘドラ, Chibi Hedora)
Voiced by: Fumihiko Tachiki, Ayumu Murase (clean form)
It is a smog monster who passionately slanders humans.
Chibi Minilla (ちびミニラ, Chibi Minira)
Voiced by: Maaya Uchida
It is Chibi Godzilla's adopted younger sister and the adopted daughter of Godzilla.
Chibi Gabara (ちびガバラ)
Voiced by: Ryōhei Kimura
It is a mutant amphibian monster who works multiple part-time jobs.
Chibi Titano (ちびチタノ)
Voiced by: Subaru Kimura
It is a mutant aquatic dinosaur and Monster Island's self-proclaimed hooligan. However, no one has ever seen him fight.
Chibi Gigan (ちびガイガン, Chibi Gaigan)
Voiced by: Mamoru Miyano
It is a monster cyborg sent to retrieve Chibi Mechagodzilla and destroy Monster Island. However, it is always easily refuted and persuaded and never achieves its goal.
Chibi JJ (ちび JJ, Chibi JJ), also known by his full name Chibi Jet Jaguar (ちびジェットジャガー, Chibi Jetto Jagā)
Voiced by: Katsuyuki Konishi
It is a humanoid robot and the self-proclaimed police officer of Monster Island.
Chibi Battra (ちびバトラ, Chibi Batora)
Voiced by: Inori Minase
It is a dark divine moth and Chibi Mothra's childhood friend.
Godzilla (ゴジラ, Gojira)
It is Chibi Godzilla's and Chibi Minilla's parent who makes a cameo throughout the series.

== Production ==
The Chibi Godzilla character—who was created to celebrate the 65th anniversary of Toho's Godzilla franchise—first appeared in the 2018 picture book Ganbare Chibi Gojira (Note: Sakazaki, Chiharu (2018). がんばれちびゴジラ [Do Your Best, Chibi Godzilla!] (in Japanese). Kodansha. ISBN 978-4-06-513066-7. OCLC 1063696103.) by Chiharu Sakazaki. In March 2023, the character's first anime television series—Chibi Godzilla Raids Again, a title that purportedly references the second Godzilla film—was announced by Toho. The series comprises thirteen 2 min 40 s episodes featuring chibi-style kaiju characters, and is a manzai comedy that is targeted more at an adult audience. In an interview with io9, producer Go Miyazaki said that the show still appeals to children, but "we have noticed that they tend to prefer more sophisticated humor".

The series is produced by animation studio Pie in the Sky and Toho. Taketo Shinkai, who is also writing the script, is directing. Character design is provided by Sakazaki and animation production is done by Junichi Endo and Yuji Nikaido. The show stars Jun Fukuyama as Chibi Godzilla and Yoshitsugu Matsuoka as Chibi Mechagodzilla, with Sumi Shimamoto doing the narration. The anime premiered on April 1, 2023, on TV Tokyo's programming block Iniminimanimo and began streaming internationally as a web series on the official Godzilla YouTube channel with English subtitles on April 11. The first season ended on its original network on June 24. On March 8, 2024, it was announced that a second season would premiere on April 3, 2024, as a segment on TV Tokyo's children's television series Oha Suta, with episodes available on YouTube immediately after airing. The second season aired weekly for a year, concluding on March 26, 2025. Additionally, it began streaming on the official Godzilla YouTube channel with English subtitles from April 10, 2024. On May 31, 2025, it was announced that a third season would premiere on July 2 with Wednesday Campanella performing the series' new theme song "Monster Island" (怪獣島, Kaijū-tō) and Katsuyuki Konishi joining the cast as Chibi JJ. The third season concluded on March 25, 2026.

On March 23, 2026, it was announced that the fourth season would premiere on April 1 with Okamoto's performing the new theme song "Ano Hi no Madness" (あの日のMadness) and Inori Minase joining the cast as Chibi Battra.

== Episodes ==
Season	Episodes	Originally released	
Season	Episodes	First released	Last released
1	13	April 1, 2023	June 24, 2023
2	52	April 3, 2024	March 26, 2025
3	39	July 2, 2025	March 25, 2026
4	TBA	April 1, 2026	TBA

=== Season 1 (2023) ===
No. overall	No. in season	Title	Original release date
1	1	"Chibi Godzilla of Monster Island"; Transliteration: "Kaijūtō no Chibi Gojira" (Japanese: 怪獣島のちびゴジラ)	April 1, 2023
An amnesiac robot Chibi Mechagodzilla washes up on the beach of Monster Island, which is inhabited by the race of monsters, and is woken up forcefully by colossal Godzilla's son, Chibi Godzilla. Chibi Mechagodzilla befriends him when told about Chibi Godzilla's dream of growing up so he can be hugged by his father.
2	2	"The Three-Headed Scary God, Chibi Ghidorah"; Transliteration: "Mittsu-Kubi no Jashin (Chibi Gidora)" (Japanese: 三つ首の邪神 ちびギドラ)	April 8, 2023
Chibi Godzilla introduces Chibi Mechagodzilla to his three-headed dragon friend, Chibi Ghidorah, who responds to his friendship request with: acceptance, strong refusal, and acceptance to exploit him of his money. One of his heads recommends matsutake for the newcomer; as one appears, the heads bite each other as to who eats it first.
3	3	"The Resplendent Maiden, Chibi Mothra"; Transliteration: "Gokusaishiki no Otome (Chibi Mosura)" (Japanese: 極彩色の乙女 ちびモスラ)	April 15, 2023
Chibi Godzilla tries to introduce Chibi Mechagodzilla to Chibi Mothra, but the Shobijin peak for her instead, convinced that they can better express her feelings. Instead, they misinterpret her, and she gets so embarrassed that she cries, releasing poisonous scales.
4	4	"The Ruler of the Skies, Chibi Rodan"; Transliteration: "Sora o Suberu Kai Tori (Chibi Radon)" (Japanese: 空を統べる怪鳥 ちびラドン)	April 22, 2023
On their way up a mountain to speak with Godzilla, the duo alongside Chibi Mothra encounter the flying irradiated Pteranodon Chibi Rodan. Tired of his bragging, Chibi Mechagodzilla criticizes Chibi Rodan's narcissistic behavior, to which he takes great offense and faints. Chibi Mothra revives him with kind words.
5	5	"Monster Study Session"; Transliteration: "Kaijū Dai Benkyō" (Japanese: 怪獣大勉強)	April 29, 2023
All aforementioned chibi monsters gather up for a study session about Godzilla and other monsters, with Chibi Godzilla serving as the educator. While Chibi Mechagodzilla answers the questions rather seriously, his peers give comedic answers, which are closer to the actual solution.
6	6	"The Roaring Dragon, Chibi Anguirus"; Transliteration: "Gōon no Bōryū (Chibi Angirasu)" (Japanese: 轟音の暴竜 ちびアンギラス)	May 6, 2023
Chibi Mechagodzilla gets caught in a bear trap by Chibi Godzilla. Suddenly, they hear a series of roars and Chibi Godzilla escapes. It becomes apparent those came from the irradiated Ankylosaur Chibi Anguirus, who has experienced a voice change, prompting Chibi Godzilla's return. Despite the Shobijin being called over, they all misunderstand Chibi Anguirus.
7	7	"All Chibi Monsters Attack"; Transliteration: "Chibi Kaijū Sō Shingeki" (Japanese: ちび怪獣総進撃)	May 13, 2023
Chibi Godzilla, Chibi Ghidorah, and Chibi Anguirus destroy a model city built by Chibi Mechagodzilla, citing their destructive instincts. An apology and a promise to clean up are accepted by him until they secretly resume disruption: furious Chibi Mechagodzilla finds out and angrily fires his laser cannons from his eyes at them before telling them to clean up. Note: The title is a reference to All Monsters Attack, Chibi Mechagodzilla's model city is based on Tokyo.
8	8	"The Sage of Grudges, Chibi Hedorah"; Transliteration: "Onnen no Kenja (Chibi Hedora)" (Japanese: 怨念の賢者 ちびヘドラ)	May 20, 2023
For a special study session, the smog monster Chibi Hedorah arrives to teach the duo and Chibi Rodan – who faints when denied recognition—about humans whose pathetic behavior he cannot tolerate. He passionately slanders humans but reveals he has never met one.
9	9	"The Bewitching Rose, Chibi Biollante"; Transliteration: "Yōenna Bara (Chibi Biorante)" (Japanese: 妖艶な薔薇 ちびビオランテ)	May 27, 2023
In a bar, the pair and Chibi Mothra become acquainted with its owner, Chibi Biollante, who recommends unusual advice. For relaxation, she suggests a metaphor for putting one's mind at rest; to treat dry skin, apply hyaluronic acid; and for Chibi Mechagodzilla's frustration, to drink water, which is not sold inside.
10	10	"Chibi Godzilla's Second Form"; Transliteration: "Chibi Gojira Daini Deitai" (Japanese: ちびゴジラ第2形態)	June 3, 2023
Chibi Godzilla wakes up with a slug-like and discolored body caused by a neck sprain and insists it is beneficial. He stretches back to his normal form thanks to Chibi Mothra's suggestion. In a different segment, he turns purple from bumping his knee. Note: This episode has many references to Shin Godzilla.
11	11	"An All-Chibi Monster Chorus"; Transliteration: "Ōru-Chibi Kaijū Dai Gasshō" (Japanese: オールちび怪獣大合唱)	June 10, 2023
Chibi Biollante hosts a karaoke party in her bar. Chibi Mechagodzilla halts Chibi Godzilla's singing of "Godzilla's Theme" when he deduces it contains only vocables. The Shobijin insist Chibi Mothra do the next song but proceed to sing without her. Chibi Anguirus roars a different title. As a finale, the party sing "Godzilla's Theme" again, leaving Chibi Mechagodzilla questioning.
12	12	"The War at Low Tide"; Transliteration: "Kanchō no Dai Kettō" (Japanese: 干潮の大決闘)	June 17, 2023
Chibi Hedorah interrupts the duo and friends who are about to dig clams. A beach cleaner, he tells them a misleading story about the types of waste he calls "weapons" that humans would dispose of. Denouncing Chibi Rodan until his fall, he tells Chibi Mechagodzilla to collect him like waste.
13	13	"A Mighty Monster's Instinct"; Transliteration: "Dai Kaijū no Honnō" (Japanese: 大怪獣の本能)	June 24, 2023
When Chibi Godzilla begins sneezing atomic heat ray at Chibi Mechagodzilla—much to his anger—and roaring mightily, his friends convince him he is entering puberty. Afraid of potentially harming his friends, he announces his departure by mail. However, he returns, confirming the syndrome to be that of a cold, and, overhearing Chibi Mechagodzilla's remorse, exhibits joy in continuing to fire at him.

=== Season 2 (2024–2025) ===
No. overall	No. in season	Title	Original release date
14	1	"Shin Chibi Godzilla"; Transliteration: "Shin Chibi Gojira" (Japanese: シン・ちびゴジラ)	April 3, 2024
Chibi Godzilla and his friends introduce themselves to newcomers to the series. As for Chibi Mechagodzilla, he lost all recollection on how he came to Monster Island. They set the goal for this season to cure his memory loss, which is labeled as chūnibyō (grandiose delusions). Note: The title is a reference to Shin Godzilla.
15	2	"Chibi Minilla is a Big Girl"; Transliteration: "Chibi Minira wa Shikkarisha" (Japanese: ちびミニラはしっかり者)	April 10, 2024
Chibi Godzilla teaches his younger sister, Chibi Minilla, stranger danger and, to demonstrate, fires his atomic heat ray at Chibi Mechagodzilla as soon as he arrives. They set up a mock situation for her, where Chibi Mechagodzilla plays the stranger.
16	3	"Smartphones Are Handy"; Transliteration: "Sumaho wa Benri" (Japanese: スマホはべんり)	April 17, 2024
Because Chibi Godzilla arrives late to a gathering, Chibi Mechagodzilla introduces his friends to the smartphone for better communication. However, no one except him shows up on next day's gathering.
17	4	"The Monster Island Godzillars"; Transliteration: "Kaijūtō Gojirāzu" (Japanese: 怪獣島ゴジラーズ)	April 24, 2024
Chibi Mechagodzilla teaches his friends who are all ignorant of baseball to play the sport. Chibi Godzilla hits a home run. Note: Chibi Mechagodzilla reminds Chibi Godzilla of Hideki Matsui, who is nicknamed "Godzilla".
18	5	"Chibi Ghidorah Can't Get Along"; Transliteration: "Chibi Gidora wa Naka ga Warui" (Japanese: ちびギドラは仲が悪い)	May 1, 2024
The chibi monsters hosts a party but Chibi Ghidorah's three heads get into a fight due to a disagreement on their movie choice and middle head playing video games at night. They briefly make up but fight again over sushi. Note: The DVD case of Scream appears in Chibi Ghidorah's right head mouth.
19	6	"Chibi Mothra's Secret Hobby"; Transliteration: "Chibi Mosura no Kakureta Shumi" (Japanese: ちびモスラの隠れた趣味)	May 8, 2024
Chibi Godzilla and Chibi Minilla finds a yaoi hand-drawn comic book. When they try to take a peek, Chibi Mothra arrives and panics due to not wanting them to find out about her secret hobby. Chibi Godzilla reveals he is an otaku because he is a Godzilla movie maniac. Note: The poster of 1954 Godzilla film is shown.
20	7	"Chibi Monsters of the Sky"; Transliteration: "Sora no Chibi Kaijūtachi" (Japanese: 空のちび怪獣たち)	May 15, 2024
Chibi Rodan boasts to Chibi Mothra on the advantages on being a flying monster until Chibi Godzilla and Chibi Mechagodzilla shows up flying as well.
21	8	"Chibi Godzilla Has the May Blues?"; Transliteration: "Chibi Gojira wa Gogatsubyō?" (Japanese: ちびゴジラは五月病？)	May 22, 2024
Chibi Godzilla transforms into his second form again but insists it is not his bad sleep but May blues as its cause. Chibi Rodan arrives and has the May blues as well.
22	9	"Manager Chibi Gabara"; Transliteration: "Ten'in wa Chibi Gabara" (Japanese: 店員はちびガバラ)	May 29, 2024
Chibi Godzilla, Chibi Mechagodzilla, and Chibi Ghidorah visits the island's new family restaurant which is managed by Chibi Gabara, who is not good at his job.
23	10	"Shobijin Slump"; Transliteration: "Shōbijin no Suranpu" (Japanese: 小美人のスランプ)	June 5, 2024
The Shobijin get into an argument because they are out-of-sync. Chibi Godzilla and Chibi Minilla arrives and asks questions to help the sisters match again.
24	11	"Dear Dad"; Transliteration: "Haikei, Otōsan" (Japanese: 拝啓、お父さん)	June 12, 2024
Chibi Godzilla writes a letter to his father for Father's Day but is not sure if it expressed his feelings well so he reads it out to his friends. His father gives a fish to Chibi Godzilla after hearing the letter.
25	12	"Chibi Minilla's First Errand"; Transliteration: "Chibi Minira, Hajimete no Otsukai" (Japanese: ちびミニラ、はじめてのおつかい)	June 19, 2024
In a parody of the Japanese reality television series Old Enough!, Chibi Minilla goes on her first errand to get potatoes but is distracted by Chibi Godzilla's narration. Chibi Minilla then asks Chibi Ghidorah for directions, only for him to respond with a Knights and Knaves puzzle. She arrives at the food stand, which is run by Chibi Gabara, but gets frustrated at the end when she is offered only bananas.
26	13	"Don't Underestimate Monster Hooligans"; Transliteration: "Yankī Kaijū Namen na yo" (Japanese: ヤンキー怪獣ナメんなよ)	June 26, 2024
Chibi Rodan brags to Chibi Godzilla and Chibi Mechagodzilla that he fought a monster hooligan and won. Chibi Titano arrives and introduces himself as the island's number one hooligan, which Chibi Rodan immediately submits to. Chibi Mechagodzilla is not convinced Chibi Titano is an actual hooligan due to his kind-heartedness towards the group.
27	14	"Pepper Farm Up In Smoke"; Transliteration: "Moeagare Pīman Hatake" (Japanese: 燃え上がれピーマン畑)	July 3, 2024
Chibi Godzilla and friends shows Chibi Mechagodzilla their vegetable farm, which can only grow peppers. They then help prepare next year's crop.
28	15	"Chibi Mechagodzilla's Hidden Features"; Transliteration: "Chibi Meka Gojira no Shin Kinō" (Japanese: ちびメカゴジラの新機能)	July 10, 2024
The chibi monsters discuss if Chibi Mechagodzilla has hidden features. They discover an electric kettle and microwave feature after Chibi Godzilla begins pressing Chibi Mechagodzilla's dorsal fins. Chibi Mechagodzilla questions his existence due to his lost memories until Chibi Godzilla presses another fin which reveals Chibi Mechagodzilla's Absolute Zero Cannon, affirming that he is a robotic monster. Chibi Godzilla then presses Chibi Mechagodzilla's chest button which activates a rice cooker, making him think he is a home appliance after all. Note: Chibi Godzilla mentions MFS-3 Kiryu (referred as Mechagodzilla), the cyborg character from Godzilla Against Mechagodzilla and its sequel Godzilla: Tokyo S.O.S..
29	16	"Madam Bio's New Menu"; Transliteration: "Bio Nēsan no Shin Menyū" (Japanese: ビオ姉さんの新メニュー)	July 17, 2024
Chibi Godzilla and Chibi Minilla visits Chibi Biollante's bar which is struggling due to price inflation. Chibi Minilla suggests adding a new menu item to attract customers. Chibi Titano arrives and tries their new soy biscuit snack which makes him thirsty.
30	17	"Chibi Ghidorah's Part-Time Job"; Transliteration: "Chibi Gidora Baito Hajimemashita" (Japanese: ちびギドラバイトはじめました)	July 24, 2024
Chibi Ghidorah interviews for a job at Chibi Gabara's restaurant. Chibi Godzilla arrives and gets irritated when no one is taking his order.
31	18	"Mr. Hedo's Lecture"; Transliteration: "Hedo-san no Nagabanashi" (Japanese: ヘドさんの長話)	July 31, 2024
The chibi monsters gather for a study session on how to be big monsters. However their mood plummets when they learn Chibi Hedorah is their teacher.
32	19	"Genius? Hard Worker? He is...Chibi Rodan"; Transliteration: "Tensai? Doryokuka? Chibi Radon" (Japanese: 天才？努力家？ちびラドン)	August 7, 2024
Chibi Godzilla and his friends witnesses Chibi Rodan working out but the latter refuses to admit it.
33	20	"Scary Stories of Monster Island"; Transliteration: "Kaijūtō no Kowai Hanashi" (Japanese: 怪獣島のこわい話)	August 14, 2024
The chibi monsters gather to tell ghost stories. However Chibi Mechagodzilla thinks the stories are not that scary.
34	21	"Mechagodzilla Shooting"; Transliteration: "Meka Gojira Shūtingu" (Japanese: メカゴジラシューティング)	August 21, 2024
Chibi Mechagodzilla creates a new shooter video game. Chibi Godzilla tries the game first before letting Chibi Hedorah play after claiming that he is good at retro games. However the game proves difficult for Hedorah and passes the controller back to Chibi Godzilla. During the Godzilla boss battle, Chibi Hedorah wanted to join but ends up crashing the game after pressing the console's button. Note: The game in this episode is based on Godzilla Against Mechagodzilla and the console is based on PlayStation 5.
35	22	"We Wanna Be Idols"; Transliteration: "Aidoru ni Naritai no" (Japanese: アイドルになりたいの)	August 28, 2024
The Shobijin aspire to become idols and form their own act called the Cosmos. Note: The first " Mothra's Song" sung by Shobijin comes from Godzilla: Tokyo S.O.S., while The Peanuts' original Mothra's Song from original 1961 Mothra film sung offscreen.
36	23	"Counting Godzillas"; Transliteration: "Gojira ga Ippiki" (Japanese: ゴジラが一匹)	September 4, 2024
Chibi Godzilla has trouble sleeping so he begins counting Godzillas to help fall asleep. Note: Hearty Zilla Soup, a soup made by Godzilla's species in Chibi Godzilla's dream is a reference to Zilla from Godzilla: Final Wars.
37	24	"Easy Godzi Recipes"; Transliteration: "Kantan! Gojireshipi" (Japanese: かんたん！ゴジレシピ)	September 11, 2024
Chibi Godzilla offers Chibi Mechagodzilla to cook dinner since he has been watching cooking shows to improve.
38	25	"Chibi Mechagodzilla Bugs Out"; Transliteration: "Bagutta Chibi Meka Gojira" (Japanese: バグったちびメカゴジラ)	September 18, 2024
Chibi Mechagodzilla is invited to Chibi Godzilla's underwater home but starts acting weird after bugging out due to contact with water.
39	26	"Monster Motorcycle Gang"; Transliteration: "Kaijū Bakusō Zoku" (Japanese: 怪獣爆走族)	September 25, 2024
Chibi Minilla wants to learn how to ride a bicycle. As Chibi Godzilla tries to teach, Chibi Rodan and Chibi Titano arrives and the latter, inspired by Chibi Minilla's determination, wants her to join his biker gang.
40	27	"Robot Monster Invasion"; Transliteration: "Shūrai! Robotto Kaijū" (Japanese: 襲来！ロボット怪獣)	October 2, 2024
As Chibi Godzilla and Chibi Mothra discuss about Chibi Mechagodzilla's memory loss, Chibi Gigan appears and reveals that Chibi Mechagodzilla was originally sent to destroy Monster Island and wants to retrieve him to complete the goal together.
41	28	"Chibi Gigan Loves Nature"; Transliteration: "Shizen o Aisuru Chibi Gaigan" (Japanese: 自然を愛するちびガイガン)	October 9, 2024
Chibi Godzilla and his friends come across Chibi Gigan while patrolling the island and discover his love for nature.
42	29	"Monster Party Games"; Transliteration: "Kaijū-ō Gēmu" (Japanese: 怪獣王ゲーム)	October 16, 2024
The chibi monsters play the game called "King of the Monsters", which whoever draws the king stick, everybody must obey the player as the king. Note: Chibi Godzilla and Chibi Mothra do an impression of Ebirah.
43	30	"Fortune-Telling"; Transliteration: "Anata no Unsei Uranau Yan" (Japanese: あなたの運勢占うやん)	October 23, 2024
Chibi Godzilla and his friends visit Chibi Biollante's bar after hearing it was renovated. They learn she has open a fortune telling and secondhand shop to attract more business.
44	31	"I Am You and You Are Who?"; Transliteration: "Ore ga Omae de Omae ga Dare ka de" (Japanese: 俺がお前でお前が誰かで)	October 30, 2024
Chibi Ghidorah's heads get into a fight. When the heads start headbutting each other, their souls get swapped.
45	32	"Godzilla King Showdown"; Transliteration: "Gojiraō Ketteisen" (Japanese: ゴジラ王決定戦)	November 6, 2024
To celebrate Godzilla Day, Chibi Godzilla holds a Godzilla-related quiz competition. Note: Chibi Godzilla performs "Sheeeh", the iconic pose from Osomatsu-kun and Godzilla from Godzilla Minus One did not shown in Godzilla size comparison.
46	33	"Chibi Gigan's Perfect Home"; Transliteration: "Chibi Gaigan no Heya Sagashi" (Japanese: ちびガイガンの部屋探し)	November 13, 2024
Chibi Gigan visits the island's real estate agency to find his perfect home.
47	34	"Chibi Hedorah is Squeaky Clean"; Transliteration: "Kireina Chibi Hedora" (Japanese: きれいなちびヘドラ)	November 20, 2024
Chibi Mechagodzilla invents a water filtration machine. When Chibi Hedorah arrives and begins his usual lectures, the chibi monster decide to put him through the machine to purify his polluted thoughts, with unexpected results.
48	35	"Chibi Minilla Gets Kidnapped"; Transliteration: "Chibi Minira Yūkai Jiken" (Japanese: ちびミニラ誘拐事件)	November 27, 2024
Chibi Gigan kidnaps Chibi Minilla in hopes of exchanging her for Chibi Mechagodzilla.
49	36	"Photogenic Sweets"; Transliteration: "Baebae♡Suītsu" (Japanese: ばえばえ♡スイーツ)	December 4, 2024
Chibi Mothra and the Shobijin wants to order some sweets but the latter is too focused on the aesthetics rather than eating them.
50	37	"Find Nessie"; Transliteration: "Nesshī o Sagase" (Japanese: ネッシーをさがせ)	December 11, 2024
The chibi monster begin searching for Nessie on Monster Island after Chibi Rodan reportedly saw it.
51	38	"Dream Hot Spring"; Transliteration: "Risō no Onsen" (Japanese: 理想の温泉)	December 18, 2024
Chibi Gigan finds his ideal hot spring but his discovery is interrupted with the arrival of Chibi Godzilla, Chibi Rodan, and Chibi Hedorah.
52	39	"Monster Island's Santa"; Transliteration: "Kaijūtō no Kurisumasu" (Japanese: 怪獣島のクリスマス)	December 25, 2024
Chibi Godzilla and Chibi Minilla learn about Santa Claus from Chibi Mechagodzilla. Chibi Minilla, who has never received a present from Santa, gets a surprise visitor on Christmas night.
53	40	"Happy New Chibi Godzilla"; Transliteration: "Akemashite Chibi Gojira" (Japanese: あけましてちびゴジラ)	January 1, 2025
The chibi monster compares the differences between New Year's in Monster Island and the human world. They later draw omikuji to learn their fortune for the year.
54	41	"First Date Butterflies"; Transliteration: "Dēto wa Dokidoki" (Japanese: デートはドキドキ)	January 8, 2025
Chibi Mothra takes Chibi Mechagodzilla to her favorite spots on the island but each place gets interrupted by their friends.
55	42	"Coming-of-Monster Ceremony"; Transliteration: "Naru Kaijū Shiki" (Japanese: 成怪獣式)	January 15, 2025
A coming-of-monster ceremony is held on Monster Island to celebrate the chibi monsters who have graduated into big ones. Chibi Hedorah makes a congratulatory speech to the monsters but is interrupted by Chibi Titano.
56	43	"Broke Monster Chibi Ghidorah"; Transliteration: "Ketsu Kaijū Chibi Gidora" (Japanese: 欠怪獣ちびギドラ)	January 22, 2025
When Chibi Ghidorah admits that he is broke, Chibi Godzilla and his friends try to help with Chibi Ghidorah's spending habits.
57	44	"Chibi Minilla Runs Away"; Transliteration: "Chibi Minira no Iede" (Japanese: ちびミニラの家出)	January 29, 2025
Chibi Minilla, frustrated with Chibi Godzilla's laziness to help with cleaning around the house, decides to run away from home.
58	45	"Monster Island's Monster Cold Wave"; Transliteration: "Kaijūtō no Dai Kanpa" (Japanese: 怪獣島の大寒波)	February 5, 2025
A once-in-a-decade cold wave hits Monster Island and Chibi Godzilla tries to stay warm with various methods. Note: The film Shin Godzilla is mentioned by Chibi Godzilla in the end.
59	46	"Chibi Mothra's Valentine"; Transliteration: "Chibi Mosura no Barentain" (Japanese: ちびモスラのバレンタイン)	February 12, 2025
Chibi Mothra asks Chibi Biollante for advice on how to make homemade Valentine's chocolates. Note: Biollante-shaped chocolate in the episode is based on Biollante's Plant Beast form from Godzilla vs. Biollante
60	47	"Welcome to the Death Game"; Transliteration: "Desugemu e Yōkoso" (Japanese: デスゲームへようこそ)	February 19, 2025
In a parody of the American horror film Saw, Chibi Godzilla and his friends are kidnapped to play in Chibi Gigan's not-so-deadly death game.
61	48	"Chibi Anguirus' True Feelings"; Transliteration: "Chibi Angirasu no Honne" (Japanese: ちびアンギラスの本音)	February 26, 2025
At the restaurant, Chibi Godzilla orders food for Chibi Anguirus as the latter can only speak in incomprehensible roars. While Chibi Godzilla believes he understands Chibi Anguirus because they are soul-bonded, Chibi Anguirus looks dissatisfied when the food arrives. Later, Chibi Mechagodzilla discovers Anguirus's true feelings through his social media posts. Eventually, Chibi Godzilla and Chibi Anguirus meet again at the restaurant to make amends.
62	49	"Chibi Rodan's Supernatural Powers"; Transliteration: "Chibi Radon no Chō Nōryoku" (Japanese: ちびラドンの超能力)	March 5, 2025
Chibi Godzilla and his friends discover that Chibi Rodan has awakened his psychic powers and decide to see them firsthand.
63	50	"My Bestie is a Hooligan"; Transliteration: "Mabudachi wa Yankī" (Japanese: マブダチはヤンキー)	March 12, 2025
Chibi Titano invites Chibi Minilla over to teach her fun activities. Worried that she might turn into a hooligan, Chibi Godzilla secretly follows and spies on her.
64	51	"True Form"; Transliteration: "Shin no Sugata" (Japanese: 真の姿)	March 19, 2025
Chibi Mechagodzilla feels unwell before awakening his true form. Chibi Gigan tries to seize the opportunity in hopes to destroy Monster Island, but things take an unexpected turn as Chibi Mechagodzilla's true form turns out to being an extreme germophobe.
65	52	"Chibi Godzilla Raids Again"; Transliteration: "Chibi Gojira no Gyakushū" (Japanese: ちびゴジラの逆襲)	March 26, 2025
Angry that his father doesn't pay attention him, Chibi Godzilla teams up with his friends to teach his father a lesson: by building the Oxygen Destroyer as part of a prank. Note: The character Dr. Daisuke Serizawa is mentioned, while the illustration from Shin Godzilla is recreated in this episode

=== Season 3 (2025–2026) ===
No. overall	No. in season	Title	Original release date
66	1	"Monster Island Tour"; Transliteration: "Kaijū-tō Tsuā" (Japanese: 怪獣島ツアー)	July 2, 2025
Chibi Godzilla gives Chibi Mechagodzilla a tour of Monster Island's lesser-known tourist spots. Note: The replica of Colosseum where Godzilla rest is a reference to Godzilla rests in the Colosseum in 2024 Monsterverse film Godzilla x Kong: The New Empire
67	2	"Chibi Monster Detectives"; Transliteration: "Chibi Kaijū Tantei-dan" (Japanese: ちび怪獣探偵団)	July 9, 2025
After hearing a scream, Chibi Godzilla discovers Chibi Rodan's lifeless body and forms a detective unit with his friends to find the culprit.
68	3	"Chibi Mechagodzilla Bug Alert"; Transliteration: "Chibi Mekagojira Bagu Chūihō" (Japanese: ちびメカゴジラバグ注意報)	July 16, 2025
Chibi Godzilla takes Chibi Mechagodzilla outside as the latter feels gloomy due to the rainy season. They meet up with Chibi Ghidorah and Chibi Mothra, who notice Chibi Mechagodzilla is acting bugged out. Soon after, he begins talking about his time in the human world.
69	4	"Monster Streamers GhidoRodan"; Transliteration: "Dōga Haishin Kaijū Gidoradon" (Japanese: 動画配信怪獣ギドラドン)	July 23, 2025
Chibi Ghidorah and Chibi Rodan start a streaming channel but are worried that the views are not increasing. Chibi Godzilla and Chibi Minilla visit to check out the kinds of videos they have has been making.
70	5	"Champion of Justice, Chibi JJ"; Transliteration: "Seigi no Mikata Chibi JJ" (Japanese: 正義の味方ちび JJ)	July 30, 2025
Chibi Godzilla believes he has discovered a powerful weapon, only for Chibi Minilla to explain it is just a broken hair dryer. Dismissing it as trash, he tosses it to the ground, prompting Chibi JJ to appear and introducing himself as the island's self-proclaimed police officer. He tries to arrest them for littering and then Chibi Titano for his hooligan vibes, but ultimately spares them.
71	6	"Monster Island's Summer Festival"; Transliteration: "Kaijūtō no Natsu Matsuri" (Japanese: 怪獣島の夏祭り)	August 6, 2025
Chibi Mothra nervously waits for Chibi Mechagodzilla after he invites her to the island's summer festival, believing it to be a date for just the two of them. However, when Chibi Godzilla and his friends also show up, she reluctantly joins the group in enjoying the festival together.
72	7	"Let's Order Monster Eats"; Transliteration: "Kaijū Ītsu o Tanomou" (Japanese: 怪獣イーツを頼もう)	August 13, 2025
With an empty fridge and not wanting to go out, Chibi Godzilla and Chibi Minilla decides to order delivery from Monster Eats. Their delivery driver turns out to be Chibi Gabara, who takes numerous detours before finally arriving at their home, only to find their food is completely soaked, due to the fact that they live underwater.
73	8	"Camping Lover Chibi Gigan"; Transliteration: "Kyanpu Daisuki Chibi Gaigan" (Japanese: キャンプ大好きちびガイガン)	August 20, 2025
Chibi Godzilla and his friends decide to go camping. However they go unprepared until Chibi Gigan shows up with camping gear and teaches them how to camp properly.
74	9	"Flowers Need Attention Too"; Transliteration: "Hana ni Kotoba o Kakemashou" (Japanese: 花に言葉をかけましょう)	August 27, 2025
The chibi monsters come across Chibi Biollante talking to flowers while watering them. She then teaches them on how to talk to flowers and the meanings behind different flowers.
75	10	"Weekly Shonen Gawdzilla"; Transliteration: "Shūkan Shōnen Gajjīra" (Japanese: 週刊少年ガッジーラ)	September 3, 2025
Chibi Godzilla and his friends find human junk wash up at the beach including cards, a ruler, and a comic magazine. Captivated by one story from the magazine, Chibi Godzilla returns to the beach every Wednesday to eagerly wait for the next issue.
76	11	"Chibi Anguirus' Changing Voice"; Transliteration: "Chibi Angirasu no Koegawari" (Japanese: ちびアンギラスの声変わり)	September 10, 2025
When Chibi Anguirus shows off a rock to Chibi Godzilla, it sparks memories of their time together before Chibi Anguirus's voice changed.
77	12	"Welcome to the Concept Cafe"; Transliteration: "Kon Kafe e Yōkoso" (Japanese: コンカフェへようこそ)	September 17, 2025
Chibi Mothra, Chibi Godzilla, and Chibi Mechagodzilla visits the Shobijin's twin-themed concept cafe.
78	13	"Chibi Mecha-Ghidorah Goes to Work"; Transliteration: "Hataraku Chibi Mekagidora" (Japanese: 働くちびメカギドラ)	September 24, 2025
Broke, Chibi Ghidorah takes Chibi Gigan's part-time job offer which involves dressing up as a robot and tricking Chibi Mechagodzilla into a water trap so that Chibi Gigan can kidnap him.
79	14	"Past Memories"; Transliteration: "Futari no Kako" (Japanese: ふたりの過去)	October 1, 2025
The chibi monsters find Chibi Hedorah drunk at Chibi Biollante's bar where he reminscnieces old memories.
80	15	"Chibi JJ's Interrogation"; Transliteration: "Chibi JJ no Torishirabe" (Japanese: ちび JJ の取り調べ)	October 8, 2025
Chibi JJ interrogates Chibi Rodan over offenses that the latter does not think are real crimes. Midway through, Chibi JJ pauses to then interrogate Chibi Godzilla, who plays along just to get the free food.
81	16	"Monster Island Marathon"; Transliteration: "Kaijūtō Marason Taikai" (Japanese: 怪獣島マラソン大会)	October 15, 2025
Chibi Godzilla practices for the Monster Island Marathon. However, on the day of the event, he once again transforms to his second form due to sleeping awkwardly again. Determined not to let it stop him, he vows to compete despite the setback.
82	17	"Chibi Mothra's Meet-Up"; Transliteration: "Chibi Mosura no Ofukai" (Japanese: ちびモスラのオフ会)	October 22, 2025
Chibi Mothra is invited to a fan meet-up for her favorite mobile game. Upon arriving, she discovers that Chibi Hedorah is also a devoted fan though more passionate about it than her.
83	18	"Monster Island's Pizzala"; Transliteration: "Kaijūtō no Pizāra" (Japanese: 怪獣島のピザーラ)	October 29, 2025
After working up an appetite, the chibi monsters decide what pizza to order after Chibi Mechagodzilla receives a flyer from island's local pizzeria.
84	19	"Real Family"; Transliteration: "Hontō no Kazoku" (Japanese: 本当の家族)	November 5, 2025
Chibi Minilla reveals to Chibi Mechagodzilla that Chibi Godzilla found her as a baby in the woods, with only a letter and pendant left as clues to her real family. Chibi Godzilla then recalls seeing a monster with a similar thing in the woods before, so they investigate only to discover it was just Chibi Gabara. Despite the setback, Chibi Godzilla insists that he, his father Godzilla, and Chibi Minilla are still a real family.
85	20	"Famous Tales From the Human World"; Transliteration: "Ningen-Kai no Meisaku" (Japanese: 人間界の名作)	November 12, 2025
At the beach, Chibi Godzilla and his friends find Chibi Rodan reading a folktale of Urashima Tarō from a book that washed ashore. Intrigued of stories from the human world, the chibi monsters read other folktales like Momotarō, Red Riding Hood, and Kachi-kachi Yama but find them too dark and believe the humans are scary.
86	21	"Monster Island Rap Battle"; Transliteration: "Kaijū Shima Saifā" (Japanese: 怪獣島サイファー)	November 19, 2025
The chibi monsters come across Chibi Titano practicing his gangster rap. He the invites them to take turns and contribute their own freestyle verses.
87	22	"Supermarket Showdown"; Transliteration: "Sūpā no Kessen" (Japanese: スーパーの決戦)	November 26, 2025
Not wanting to pay full price at the supermarket, Chibi Godzilla waits until the discount stickers are placed at noon. However, Chibi Biollante shows up with the same idea and the two begin their fight to see who can get the best bargains.
88	23	"Godzilla vs. the Robot Monster Legion"; Transliteration: "Gojira VS Robotto Kaijū Gundan" (Japanese: ゴジラVSロボット怪獣軍団)	December 3, 2025
Chibi Gigan and Chibi Ghidorah (dressed up as Chibi Mecha-Ghidorah) takes Chibi Godzilla as hostage in hopes of taking down Godzilla and conquer the island.
89	24	"Guess the Twin"; Transliteration: "Shimai no Dotchi?" (Japanese: 姉妹のどっち？)	December 10, 2025
Chibi Godzilla and Chibi Mechagodzilla have difficulties telling the Shobijin apart after one of the twins gets sick.
90	25	"I Hate Hospitals"; Transliteration: "Byōin Nanka Daikirai" (Japanese: 病院なんか大嫌い)	December 17, 2025
Chibi Gozilla takes Chibi Minilla to the hospital after the latter develops a fever.
91	26	"I Wanna Meet Santa"; Transliteration: "Santasan ni Aitai" (Japanese: サンタさんに会いたい)	December 24, 2025
During a Christmas gift exchange, Chibi Minilla recalls when Santa visited and gave her a present the previous Christmas. Curious and excited, the other chibi monsters decide to stay awake that night to see if Santa will appear again.
92	27	"Monster Island's Year-End Party"; Transliteration: "Kaijū Tōdai Bōnenkai" (Japanese: 怪獣島大忘年会)	December 24, 2025
The chibi monsters gather at Chibi Biollante's bar for a New Year's Party where they look back on their favorite memories from the past year.
93	28	"Chibi JJ's Past"; Transliteration: "Chibi JJ no Kako" (Japanese: ちびJJの過去)	January 7, 2026
Chibi Mechagodzilla meets Chibi JJ for the first time. However, the latter mistakes Chibi Mechagodzilla for an evil robot sent to capture him after Chibi JJ reveals that he escaped the human world to avoid housework.
94	29	"Chibi Rodan Has a Hard Head"; Transliteration: "Chibi Radon wa Ishiatama" (Japanese: ちびラドンは石頭)	January 14, 2026
The chibi monsters try to find out how tough Chibi Rodan's hard head really is.
95	30	"The Version You Dropped..."; Transliteration: "Anata ga Otoshita no wa" (Japanese: あなたが落としたのは)	January 21, 2026
Chibi Godzilla and Chibi Mechagodzilla go outside to unwind, but is interrupted when Chibi Hedorah arrives, complaining that no one plays outside anymore. He jumps into the pond for a swim, causing the pond's spring spirit to appear and ask which version of Hedorah fell in. After Chibi Godzilla explains it was normal Chibi Hedorah, the spirit returns the clean version instead, much to their disappointment. The pair try to convince the clean version to jump into the pond again to return to normal. When it fails, Chibi Godzilla jumps in himself for encouragement, prompting the spring spirit to reappear. This time, Chibi Mechagodzilla lies and claims that the clean version fell in. Seeing through his deception, the spring spirit refuses to return Chibi Godzilla at all.
96	31	"Tsk-Tsk Ramen"; Transliteration: "Chūka Soba Shitauchi" (Japanese: 中華そば舌打ち)	January 28, 2026
Chibi Godzilla and his friends stops by the island's ramen shop, run by Chibi Gabara, where Chibi Gigan has recently joined as their new part-time employee.
97	32	"Chibi JJ 24 Hours"; Transliteration: "Chibi JJ 24-ji" (Japanese: ちびJJ24時)	February 4, 2026
Chibi Godzilla and Chibi Minilla spends the day documenting Chibi JJ's "crime fighting" activities after Chibi JJ begins following Chibi Titano due to sensing potential danger from him.
98	33	"Viral Ghost Video"; Transliteration: "Bazu rō Shinrei Sōga" (Japanese: バズろう心霊動画)	February 11, 2026
Chibi Ghidorah and Chibi Rodan begins filming a new video for their GhidoRodan channel, heading to a haunted location to see if there are actual ghosts. When Chibi Godzilla shows up, he tags along with the pair due to his curiosity.
99	34	"The Monster Game of Life"; Transliteration: "Kaijū-Sei Gēmu" (Japanese: 怪獣生ゲーム)	February 18, 2026
The chibi monsters gather to play the board game The Monster Game of Life.
100	35	"Chibi Monster Detectives Return"; Transliteration: "Chibi Kaijū Tantei-Dan, Futatabi" (Japanese: ちび怪獣探偵団、再び)	February 25, 2026
101	36	"Three-Timer?! Operation Love"; Transliteration: "Mimata!? Koi no dai Sakusen" (Japanese: 三股！？恋の大作戦)	March 4, 2026
102	37	"I Wanna Talk to Dad"; Transliteration: "Otōsan to Hanashitai" (Japanese: お父さんと話したい)	March 11, 2026
103	38	"Chibi Gigan vs. Chibi JJ"; Transliteration: "Chibi Gaigan vs Chibi JJ" (Japanese: ちびガイガンvsちびJJ)	March 18, 2026
104	39	"The End of Monster Island"; Transliteration: "Kaijū Shima no Saigo" (Japanese: 怪獣島の最後)	March 25, 2026

=== Season 4 (2026) ===
No. overall	No. in season	Title	Original release date
105	1	"You May Call Me Chibi Battra"; Transliteration: "Chibi Batora desu wa" (Japanese: ちびバトラですわ)	April 1, 2026
106	2	"Screw on the Loose"; Transliteration: "Ochite ita Neji" (Japanese: 落ちていたネジ)	April 8, 2026
107	3	"Monster Island Radio"; Transliteration: "Kaijū-Jima Reidio" (Japanese: 怪獣島レイディオ)	April 29, 2026
108	4	"Chibi JJ's Traffic Safety Class"; Transliteration: "Chibi JJ no Kōtsū Anzen Kyōshitsu" (Japanese: ちびJJの交通安全教室)	May 13, 2026
109	5	"Chibi Hedorah Can't Sleep"; Transliteration: "Chibi Hedora wa Nemuranai" (Japanese: ちびヘドラは眠らない)	May 27, 2026
110	6	"Why Does the Sushi Go 'Round?"; Transliteration: "Kaitensushi wa Naze Mawaru" (Japanese: 回転寿司はなぜ回る)	June 10, 2026
111	7	"Typhooon Sky Race"; Transliteration: "Arashi no Kūchū Rēsu" (Japanese: 嵐の空中レース)	June 24, 2026
112	8	"Nursery Rhyme of the Spirited Away"; Transliteration: "Kamigakushi no Warabe uta" (Japanese: 神隠しのわらべうた)	July 8, 2026
113	9	"Recruit Chibi Mechagodzilla"; Transliteration: "Chibi Mekagojira o Kan'yū Seyo" (Japanese: ちびメカゴジラを勧誘せよ)	July 22, 2026
114	10	"CBGZ Personality Test"; Transliteration: "CBGZ Shindan" (Japanese: CBGZ 診断)	August 5, 2026
115	11	"Chibi Anguirus' Web Journal"; Transliteration: "Chibi Angirasu no u~Ebu Nikki" (Japanese: ちびアンギラスのウェブ日記)	August 19, 2026
116	12	"The Young Lady and Her Butlers"; Transliteration: "Ojōsama to Shitsuji-Tachi" (Japanese: お嬢様と執事たち)	September 2, 2026
117	13	"Hot-Tempered Dad in the Colosseum"; Transliteration: "Korosseo no Kaminari Otōsan" (Japanese: コロッセオのカミナリお父さん)	September 16, 2026
118	14	"Convenilla Grand Opening"; Transliteration: "Binira Honjitsu Ōpun" (Japanese: ビニラ本日オープン)	September 30, 2026
119	15	"Guess How Much?"; Transliteration: "Korena n Ho Ya Omou?" (Japanese: これなんぼや思う？)	October 14, 2026
120	16	"Oops, I Heat Ray-ed the Bed"; Transliteration: "O ne Sashi Chatta" (Japanese: おね射しちゃった)	October 28, 2026
121	17	"Inaugural Issue of the Monster Island Paper"; Transliteration: "Sōkan! Kaijū-jima Shinbun" (Japanese: 創刊！怪獣島新聞)	November 11, 2026
