= Godzilla's son =

Godzilla's son may refer to:

- Minilla, Godzilla's adopted son in the Shōwa continuity of Godzilla films
  - Son of Godzilla, the film Minilla debuted in
- Godzilla Junior, Godzilla's adopted son in the Heisei continuity of Godzilla films
