= Godzilla (Cerasini series) =

Novel series by Marc Cerasini

- Godzilla Returns (1996); Godzilla 2000 (1997); Godzilla at World's End (1998); Godzilla vs. the Robot Monsters (1998)
- Author: Marc Cerasini
- Cover artist: Bob Eggleton
- Country: United States
- Language: English
- Publisher: Random House
- Published: 1996 – 1998
- Media type: Print (paperback)

Godzilla is a series of novels written by author Marc Cerasini, based on the film series of the same name produced by Toho. While all set within the same continuity (a unique continuity in which only the first Godzilla film has taken place), each novel has its own plot and storyline, with Toho's kaiju featured as the stars.

== Godzilla Returns ==
Godzilla Returns, the first novel in the series, was published in 1996. The story follows the reemergence of Godzilla for the first time since 1954, rampaging and destroying the city of Tokyo. The book is clearly set to follow Godzilla, King of the Monsters! (the English version of the original Godzilla film), as Steve Martin (Raymond Burr's character) is said to have been present during the original attack. The finale of the novel is similar to the 1984 film The Return of Godzilla, as Godzilla is drawn away from the city using a lure identical to the one used in that film. However, the lure is used to draw Godzilla to the deepest part of the ocean, rather than a volcano.

== Godzilla 2000 ==
The second novel, Godzilla 2000, was published in 1997. Its plot concerns the United States government forming a new organization, G-Force, dedicated to stopping the attacks of giant monsters, especially Godzilla. Meanwhile, an asteroid shower threatens mankind with extinction. The initial wave delivers a parasitic alien organism to Earth, which bonds with a praying mantis to form a swarm of gigantic creatures dubbed Kamacuras. Soon after, another monster, Varan, surfaces in Mexico. A gigantic Pteranodon named Rodan emerges from the North Pole and builds a nest on Mount Rushmore. And Godzilla itself surfaces off the coast of California, ultimately crossing the United States and arriving in New York City on January 1, 2000. There, it is revealed that it has been led there by Mothra, the Protector of the Earth, to destroy the dreaded King Ghidorah, the three-headed space dragon who emerged from one of the asteroids approaching Earth. The monsters battle and Godzilla defeats Ghidorah and drives it away, severing Ghidorah's middle head in the process.

== Godzilla at World's End ==
The third novel, Godzilla at World's End, was published in 1998, and centers around a new threat that emerges from within the Earth itself a year after Godzilla's battle with King Ghidorah. An ancient civilization, long dead and buried beneath Antarctica, springs to life with the arrival of a teenage girl from the surface world, who becomes corrupted by the power she finds there and seeks to destroy mankind, unleashing five new monsters: Gigan, Megalon, Manda, Battra and Hedorah. Her ultimate weapons are the Babel Wave, which cuts off all electronic communications on Earth, and the plant monster Biollante. With the help of a group of teenage scientists, Mothra, a young Rodan (the one that hatched from the egg on Mount Rushmore), and the newly awakened Anguirus, Godzilla makes it to the city in the earth. During the trip, Gigan, Hedorah, and Battra are supposedly killed while Manda and Megalon flee into the wild. Godzilla and Biollante have a final battle with Godzilla winning, saving the earth. However, Godzilla becomes trapped in the Earth's center. As the book ends, the Russian government shows interest in studying Anguirus while America and Japan work together on a new project. It is then revealed that Manda and Megalon are still on the loose, along with Rodan.

== Godzilla vs. the Robot Monsters ==
The fourth novel, Godzilla vs. the Robot Monsters, was published in 1998. Set in the year 2004, Godzilla emerges from a volcano while the United States, Russia, and Mongolia have each been developing anti-monster mechs: Mechagodzilla, Moguera and Mecha-King Ghidorah, respectively. In Montana, Mechagodzilla is pitted against Baragon, who has emerged from hibernation to feed on humans and herds of cattle alike, while Moguera defeats and captures Anguirus in Russia. Ghidorah, on the other hand, is in the hands of a corrupt Kulgan Khan, the new ruler of Mongolia, who intends to use the rebuilt space dragon as a weapon of conquest. In the climax of the novel, Godzilla escapes from the bottom of the Earth and returns to Japan to do battle with Ghidorah, unwittingly teaming up with Mechagodzilla and Moguera in the process. However, the only survivor of the fight is Godzilla itself. In the end, Godzilla returns to the sea, Anguirus is moved to a wildlife sanctuary for study, Rodan returns to Antarctica, and Baragon escapes, albeit trapped underground temporarily.

== Godzilla and the Lost Continent (unpublished) ==
The final book, Godzilla and the Lost Continent, was set for a 1999 release, but was never published. According to an interview with Cerasini, this was a result of the poor critical and commercial performance of the 1998 Godzilla film produced by TriStar Pictures. The summary given in the previous book reveals that a new continent would rise from the Pacific, with several nations laying claim to it, but that it would also harbor great danger: Varan, Manda and Battra now call this continent home, as well as a new monster and a previously unknown civilization. The King of the Monsters resurfaces to do battle with this threat. The book's antagonist was to be a giant made out of stone, named either Raijin or Daitengu. Furthermore, Raijin/Daitengu would have actually been the herald and champion for an even more powerful intelligence, namely the Earth itself, which not only rose the lost continent and summoned all the monsters to it, but also possessed Biollante to serve as its avatar, as well as creating equally monstrous forest growth which soon appears all over the world, in a catastrophic bid to cleanse itself of all human life. Now Godzilla is the only hope for both mankind and the inhabitants of the Lost Continent against these two sentient literal forces of nature.

== See also ==
- Godzilla (Ciencin series)
