= Godzilla vs. Mechagodzilla II =

1993 film by Takao Okawara

- Theatrical release poster

Japanese name
- Katakana: ゴジラvsメカゴジラ
Transcriptions
- Revised Hepburn: Gojira tai Mekagojira
- Directed by: Takao Okawara
- Written by: Wataru Mimura
- Produced by: Shōgo Tomiyama
- Starring: Masahiro Takashima; Ryoko Sano; Megumi Odaka; Yûsuke Kawazu; Daijiro Harada
- Cinematography: Yoshinori Sekiguchi
- Edited by: Miho Yoneda
- Music by: Akira Ifukube
- Production company: Toho Pictures
- Distributed by: Toho
- Release date: December 11, 1993
- Running time: 107 minutes
- Country: Japan
- Languages: Japanese; English
- Budget: ¥1 billion ($9.5 million)
- Box office: $36 million

Godzilla vs. Mechagodzilla II, known in Japan as simply Godzilla vs. Mechagodzilla (ゴジラvsメカゴジラ, Gojira tai Mekagojira), is a 1993 Japanese kaiju film directed by Takao Okawara, with special effects by Kōichi Kawakita. Distributed by Toho and produced under their subsidiary Toho Pictures, it is the 20th film in the Godzilla franchise, as well as the fifth film to be released during the franchise's Heisei era. The film features the fictional monster character Godzilla, along with Baby Godzilla, Rodan and the mecha character Mechagodzilla, and stars Masahiro Takashima, Ryoko Sano, Megumi Odaka, Yûsuke Kawazu and Daijiro Harada, with Kenpachiro Satsuma as Godzilla, Hurricane Ryu as Baby Godzilla and Wataru Fukuda as Mechagodzilla and its powered-up form Super Mechagodzilla. Despite its English title, the film is not a sequel to the 1974 Showa-era film Godzilla vs. Mechagodzilla.

Godzilla vs. Mechagodzilla II was released theatrically in Japan on December 11, 1993, to generally positive reviews from critics. The film was a commercial success, generating a combined $194,000,000 (equivalent to $432,000,000 in 2025) from the box office, book sales and merchandise sales by 1994. It was the first Japanese film to use Dolby Digital sound format. It was released directly to pay-per-view satellite television in the United States in 1998 by Sony Pictures Television. The film was promoted as the last film in the franchise's Heisei series, and was also promoted by a children's television program called Adventure! Godzilland 2. Although Godzilla vs. Mechagodzilla II was not the final entry in the Heisei series, as it was followed by Godzilla vs. SpaceGodzilla in 1994, Toho producers initially wished to avoid competing with TriStar's then-upcoming Godzilla reboot.

== Plot ==
In the aftermath of Mecha-King Ghidorah's defeat by the hand of Godzilla in 1992, (Note: As depicted in Godzilla vs. King Ghidorah (1991).) the United Nations establishes the "United Nations Godzilla Countermeasures Center" (UNGCC) to stop Godzilla. Their military branch, G-Force, salvages Ghidorah's remains and reverse engineers them to build two anti-Godzilla weapons: an aerial gunship called Garuda and a mecha modeled after Godzilla called Mechagodzilla.

Two years later and one year after Godzilla battled Mothra and Battra in Yokohama, (Note: As depicted in Godzilla vs. Mothra (1992).) a joint Russian-Japanese expedition comes across what they assume is a large Pteranodon egg on Adonoa Island, an uncharted island located in Bering Sea. The egg gives off a telepathic signal that attracts Godzilla and Rodan, an adult Pteranodon irradiated by nuclear waste. Godzilla critically wounds Rodan during the ensuing battle while the research team escapes with the egg. It is taken to a research center in Kyoto, where it imprints on young female scientist Azusa Gojo.

Eventually, a juvenile Godzillasaurus hatches from the egg. The creature, named Baby Godzilla by Gojo, is concluded to have been left in the Pteranodon nest with Rodan in a manner similar to the brood parasitism displayed by European cuckoos. Godzilla appears, once again responding to Baby's psychic call. The JSDF mobilizes Mechagodzilla, which intercepts Godzilla as it is heading to Kyoto. The two battle, with Mechagodzilla initially having the upper hand until Godzilla disables the mecha with an energy pulse. Godzilla continues searching for Baby, but the scientists, having discovered the telepathic link between the monsters, shield it from Godzilla. Frustrated, Godzilla destroys most of Kyoto before returning to the ocean.

Tests on the baby reveal that it has a second brain in its hips that controls the animal's movement. The UNGCC assumes that this also holds true for Godzilla's species and decide to use Baby to bait Godzilla into another fight with Mechagodzilla. The "G-Crusher" is installed into Mechagodzilla, which will allow the mecha to penetrate Godzilla's hide and destroy its second brain. Miki Saegusa is ordered to become a part of Mechagodzilla's crew to locate Godzilla's second brain. While she is reluctant due to her mental connection with Godzilla, she agrees. The plan backfires when Rodan, having transformed into Fire Rodan since its battle with Godzilla, responds to Baby's call and intercepts the UNGCC transport.

In response, they send Mechagodzilla and the upgraded Garuda, piloted by Kazuma Aoki, after Rodan instead, injuring it in the process. Godzilla arrives soon after and attacks Mechagodzilla. The fight is evenly matched until Mechagodzilla merges with Garuda to become Super-Mechagodzilla. Mechagodzilla paralyzes Godzilla, but Rodan responds to Baby's call, sacrifices itself, and transfers its power to regenerate Godzilla's second brain. This empowers Godzilla, allowing it to destroy Mechagodzilla.

Godzilla locates Baby, who is initially afraid of Godzilla's gigantic size, but is telepathically convinced by Miki to go with Godzilla, and the two monsters return to the ocean together.

== Cast ==
- Masahiro Takashima as Kazuma Aoki
- Ryoko Sano as Azusa Gojo
- Megumi Odaka as Miki Saegusa
- Yūsuke Kawazu as Professor Hiroshi Ohmae
- Akira Nakao as Takaaki Aso
- Kenji Sahara as Takayuki Segawa
- Tadao Takashima as Chief Hosono
- Daijiro Harada as Takuya Sasaki
- Koichi Ueda as Iwao Hyodo
- Leo Meneghetti as Dr. Leo Asimov
- Andrew Smith as Andrew Johnson
- Shelley Sweeney as Catherine Berger
- Kenpachiro Satsuma as Godzilla
- Wataru Fukuda as Mechagodzilla and Super Mechagodzilla
- Hurricane Ryu as Baby Godzilla

Keiko Imamura and Sayaka Osawa, who previously portrayed the Cosmos from the previous film, make a cameo as the psychic teachers.

== Production ==
Wataru Fukuda during a suit-fitting session

The fifth film in the Heisei series of Godzilla movies was originally meant to be the last, in order to avoid competing with the upcoming TriStar American Godzilla reboot film (which was later delayed) and to honor the recent passing of Ishirō Honda. Toho had initially wanted to produce a remake of King Kong vs. Godzilla, but were unable to acquire the rights to use the King Kong character from Universal Pictures. When that project was scrapped, Toho considered pitting Godzilla against Mechani-Kong, a mecha first introduced in King Kong Escapes. The plot would have involved Mechani-Kong sporting syringes containing G-Force special forces which would have been injected into Godzilla's bloodstream in a manner similar to Fantastic Voyage, though the project was abandoned, as obtaining the rights to a monster even bearing the semblance of King Kong proved too costly.

Producers Tomoyuki Tanaka and Shōgo Tomiyama felt that reviving Mechagodzilla was a logical next step for the series after the successful reintroduction of King Ghidorah and Mothra to contemporary audiences. Furthermore, effects artist Koichi Kawakita had already demonstrated his competence in designing and creating mecha contraptions like the Super XII, Mecha-King Ghidorah, and the machines featured in Gunhed. The decision to reintroduce Minilla (rechristened as Baby Godzilla) was made in order to appeal to the largely female audience that made Godzilla vs. Mothra a financial success, despite objections by director Takao Okawara, who held a low opinion of the 1960s movies the character had previously been featured in. In the original ending for the film, Godzilla destroys Garuda but is killed by Mechagodzilla. Garuda's nuclear reactor explodes and resurrects the King of the Monsters. Another ending was considered in which Godzilla's escaping life energy mutates Baby Godzilla into a new adult Godzilla, a concept that was later used in Godzilla vs. Destoroyah.

Toho promoted the film as Akira Ifukube's last performance as composer, and aired the children's program Adventure Godzilla-land, which portrayed Godzilla and Mechagodzilla as rival news anchors reporting on the events of the upcoming movie, as well as featuring the dance routine "Be like Godzilla". Shortly after the movie was released, Toho further promoted the film's merchandise by opening a Godzilla-themed simulation ride in Sanrio Puroland called "Monster Planet of Godzilla", which featured Megumi Odaka as the captain of a spacecraft which lands on a planet inhabited by Godzilla, Rodan, and Mothra, who are then accidentally transported to contemporary Tokyo.

Kawakita made more extensive use of CGI than in previous Godzilla movies he worked on, and made an effort for the featured monsters to be less reliant on energy beams during battle sequences, particularly Rodan, who was portrayed via handpuppets and marionettes rather than through suitmation. Baby Godzilla was performed by series veteran Hurricane Ryu, and was designed to look much more dinosaur-like than his previous incarnation. Mechagodzilla was redesigned to be much less angular in form, and was performed by Wataru Fukuda. The Mechagodzilla suit itself consisted of multiple separate elements which Fukuda wore like plate armor. Kawakita originally envisioned Mechagodzilla being able to split into aerial and terrestrial units, though this idea was scrapped in favor of the character merging with the flying battleship Garuda. The new Godzilla suit was notably bulkier in profile than its predecessor, and had smaller shoulders and slimmer legs. The tail was also placed higher up the back, thus resulting in a very top-heavy appearance. Like the previous suit, the one used in Godzilla vs. Mechagodzilla II had an electronically operated head that could tilt its head independently of the body. The suit previously used for Godzilla vs. Mothra was recycled for the long shots during the battle with Rodan, the rampage through Tokyo, and the character's departure into the sea during the end credits.

== Release ==
=== English versions ===
After the film was released in Japan, Toho commissioned a Hong Kong company to dub the film into English. In this international version of the movie, an English title card was superimposed over the Japanese title, as had been done with the previous 1990s Godzilla films.

In past English releases, including dubbed films and video game titles, Rodan's name was pronounced "roh-dan". In Japan, however, his name has always been pronounced (and spelled in katakana) as "rah-dohn" (ラドン). In the English version of this film, the producers changed his name back to Radon, as it is in Japan.

Columbia TriStar Home Entertainment released Godzilla vs. Mechagodzilla II on home video on August 3, 1999. This was the first time the film had been officially released in the United States. Instead of using the original monaural English dub, a newer stereo version was included, with the main characters' lines and most other dialog re-recorded by a mostly different Hong Kong cast. Most of the new cast did not start dubbing until the late 1990s. The purpose or origin of this revised English version is unknown. TriStar additionally cut the end credits and created new titles and opening credits.

The original version of the international dub is not known to have ever been released on video in its complete form. The only evidence of its existence is in the Hindi theatrical version. The Hindi dubbing company lacked a clean music and effects track and only had access to a copy of the original English version. Therefore, English dialog was muted and replaced with library tracks and music from other parts of the film itself, but occasionally the English source track was left intact.

An anamorphic widescreen transfer of the "new" English version was later released on DVD by TriStar in February 2005 with the option to listen to the original Japanese audio.

=== Box office ===
The film sold 3.8 million tickets in Japan, earning ¥1.87 billion (roughly $18 million) in distributor rental income and ¥3.18 billion in gross receipts. The film grossed a total box office revenue of $36,000,000 (equivalent to $80,000,000 in 2025) by 1994.

=== Critical response ===
The film received mostly positive reviews. On Rotten Tomatoes, an approval rating of 83% based on 6 reviews, with a rating average of 7.2/10."

Monster Zero said that "some critical flaws exist" but felt overall that "of all the films of the [Heisei era], Godzilla vs MechaGodzilla II represents Toho's most technically and artistically successful effort," adding that "the action sequences in this film are impeccable... excitingly staged, logical, and quite dramatic." American Kaiju said the film "stumbles in the areas of both story and special effects" but concluded it to be "a good, solid entry in the Godzilla series", saying that "the battles between Godzilla and Mechagodilla entertain" and "Akira Ifukube's music score soars." Japan Hero said "the story was interesting", "the soundtrack is plain gorgeous", and "the costume designs are just as great," concluding: "While this is not my top favorite movie [of the Heisei series], it is definitely one of the best."

=== Home media ===
The film has been released twice on home media. The first release, by Columbia/Tristar Home Entertainment, was released on February 8, 2005. The subtitles for the Japanese track are really "dubtitles" (the subtitles are actually the captions for the English track). The video transfer is a 1.78:1 widescreen version of TriStar's print. This means the Toho logos and end credits have been cut and all the onscreen, optical text from Toho's international version has been removed or replaced by video-generated text.

The second release was by Sony on Blu-ray as part of The Toho Godzilla Collection and was released on May 6, 2014, in a two-disc double feature with Godzilla vs. SpaceGodzilla.

=== Merchandise ===
In addition to its box office gross, the film generated a further $158,000,000 (equivalent to $352,000,000 in 2025) from sales of books and merchandise by 1994, for a combined $194,000,000 (equivalent to $432,000,000 in 2025) generated from the box office, book sales and merchandise sales, making it the most profitable non-animated Japanese film at the time.

=== Accolades ===
Year	Award	Category	Recipient(s)	Result
1994	17th Japan Academy Film Prize	Best Sound	Kazuo Miyauchi	Nominated
