= Lindsey Kelk =

English writer

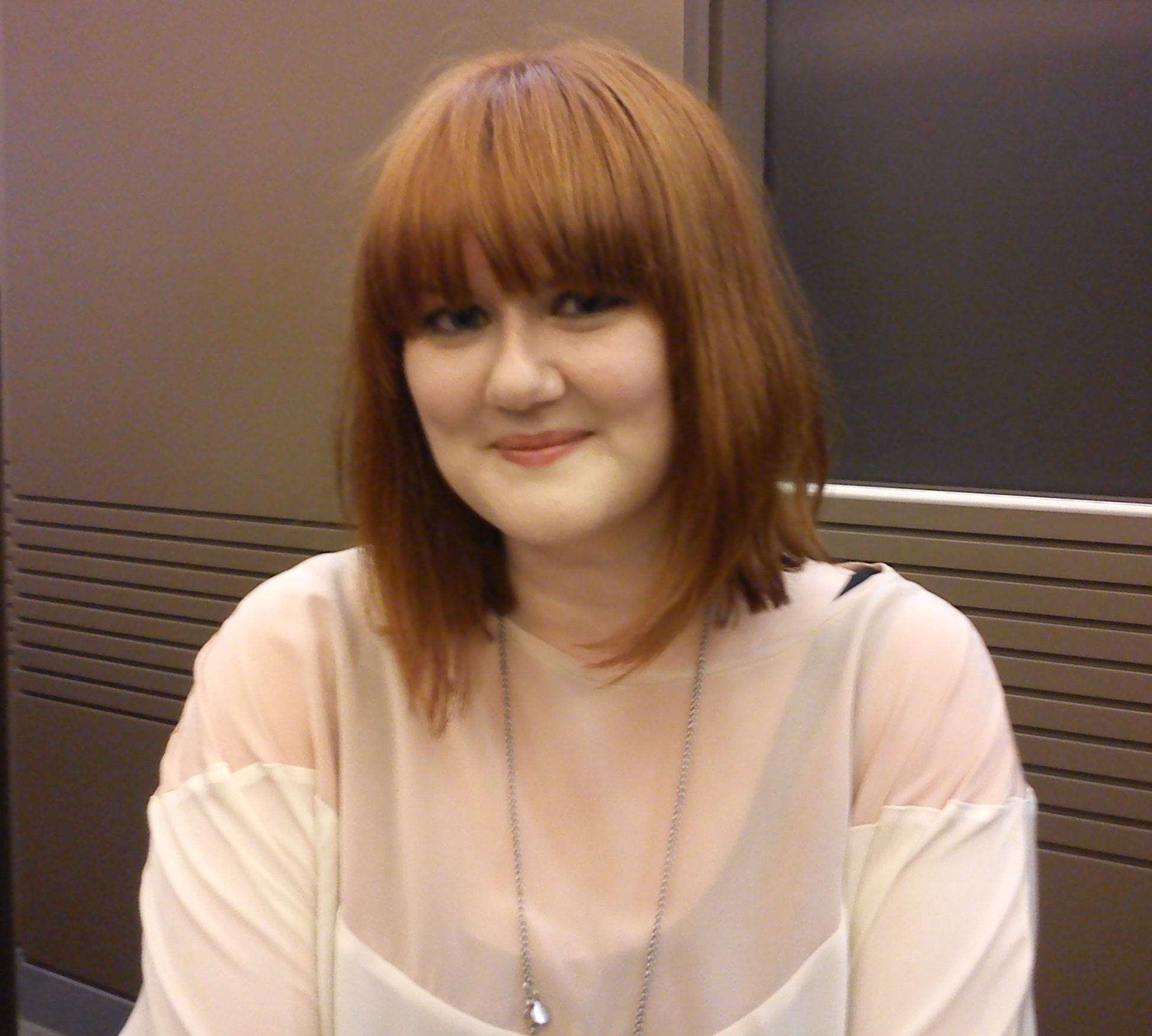
- Lindsey Kelk at a book signing on 1st June 2012
- Born: 3 October 1980 (age 45); Doncaster, England
- Education: Nottingham Trent University
- Occupations: Author, podcaster
- Writing career
- Language: English
- Genre: fiction
- Notable works: "I Heart" series, The Christmas Wish, On A Night Like This
- Website: www.lindseykelk.com

Lindsey Kelk (born 3 October 1980) is an English author, journalist and former children's book editor. She initially signed a up-to three-book deal with HarperCollins following the submission of a manuscript for her first novel. To date, she has published 22 adult books and is also the author of the children's series Cinders and Sparks.

== Early life ==
Kelk was born and raised in Doncaster, South Yorkshire. She graduated from Nottingham Trent University in 2002 and subsequently moved to London.

== Career ==
Kelk was inspired to write her first book I heart New York after returning from a holiday to New York City to her home in London, England, and being unable to get over post-vacation blues. She immediately decided it would be a series of books, each taking in different cities, partly inspired by her teen experience of reading the Sweet Valley High series of novels. She found an agent through a roundabout route; having sent out copies of I Heart New York to various agents and having received several rejection letters, one agent got in contact with Kelk. However, it transpired that the agent disliked the book and wanted her to work on a different project, and that she "would have to use a pseudonym because [her] name sounded like a cat being sick". Kelk decided not to sign with the agent and instead asked a friend who worked with book publisher HarperCollins to recommend one. The friend handed a copy of the book to the commercial women's fiction team, who signed her to a three-book deal.

Kelk has written for many women's magazines, including a monthly column for magazine Marie Claire. In 2009, she relocated with her full-time job as a children's book editor to New York itself, something she said was following in the footsteps of the lead character from her book series. She currently works as a full-time writer.

In 2017, Kelk started award-winning beauty podcast, Full Coverage, along with co-host Harriet Hadfield, a fellow British makeup artist and YouTuber in Los Angeles. She is also one of the hosts of popular pro-wrestling podcast, Tights and Fights.

After a visit to the Canadian side of Niagara Falls during a road trip in 2010, Kelk decided to write the location into one of her books. I heart Hollywood was nominated for the People's Choice Award in the inaugural Pure Passion Awards in 2010, an awards ceremony set up by the Romantic Novelists' Association. At the following year's awards, I Heart Paris was nominated for Romantic Comedy Novel of the Year.

Her novel I Heart Christmas spent two weeks on The Sunday Times bestseller list in December 2013 followed by A Girl’s Best Friend in 2015. In 2023, her novel Love Me Do was chosen as one of the top seven popular fiction books of the year by The Times. Christmas Fling, published in September 2026, became a USA Today bestseller and won the Romantic Novels of the Year Award for The Festive/Holiday Romance Novel.

In 2022, Kelk signed a deal with Magpie Books to write a three part YA Series. Called The Savannah Red saga, the first book, The Bell Witches was released in 2024. The second book in the series, The Witch And The Wolf, published in the UK in February 2026 and became an instant Sunday Times bestseller.

In November 2025, Kelk announced a new adult romance series under the pen name Elle Kelk. HQ, an imprint of Harper Collins, won a five-way auction to publish the two books. The first book in the series Hit or Miss will be published in June 2026 and Sink or Swim will follow in February 2027 for Valentine’s Day.

== Personal life ==
Kelk married editor Jeff Israel on September 27, 2019. Her favourite book of all time is The Secret History by Donna Tartt. She previously lived in Williamsburg and Park Slope, Brooklyn but moved to Los Angeles in 2015. She has two cats and is a big fan of professional wrestling.

== Bibliography ==
=== I Heart Series ===
- I Heart New York (2009)
- I Heart Hollywood (2010)
- I Heart Paris (2010)
- I Heart Vegas (2012)
- I Heart London (2012)
- I Heart Christmas (2013)
- I Heart Forever (2017)
- I Heart Hawaii (2019)

=== Tess Brookes Series ===
- About A Girl (2013)
- What a Girl Wants (2014)
- A Girl's Best Friend (2015)

=== Jenny Lopez Series ===
- Jenny Lopez Has A Bad Week (2011)
- Jenny Lopez Saves Christmas (2014)

=== Singles ===
- The Single Girl's To Do List (2011)
- Always The Bridesmaid (2015)
- We Were On A Break (2016)
- One in a Million (2018)
- In Case You Missed It (2020)
- On a Night Like This (2021)
- The Christmas Wish (2022)
- Love Me Do (2023)
- Love Story (2024)
- Christmas Fling (2025)

=== Cinders and Sparks Series ===
- Cinders and Sparks: Magic at Midnight (2019)
- Cinders and Sparks: Fairies in the Forest (2019)
- Cinders & Sparks: Goblins and Gold (2020)

=== Savanna Red Series ===
- The Bell Witches (2024)
- The Witch and the Wolf (due for release Feb 2026)
