= Naoko Kamio =

Japanese suit actress (born 1967)

Naoko Kamio (神尾 直子, Kamio Naoko; born November 16, 1967 in Shizuoka Prefecture) is a Japanese suit actress. She is married to the suit actor, Hirofumi Fukuzawa.

== Partial filmography ==
- Denji Sentai Megaranger as Mega Pink
- Tetsuwan Tantei Robotack as Robotack
- Mirai Sentai Timeranger as TimePink, Sion (stunt double), TimeGreen
- Hyakujuu Sentai Gaoranger as GaoWhite, Copywhite
- Ninpuu Sentai Hurricaneger as Furabijinu
- Tokusou Sentai Dekaranger as Deka Pink
- Godzilla: Final Wars as Minilla, Rodan
- Mahou Sentai Magiranger as Snowgel, Smoky
- GoGo Sentai Boukenger as Bouken Pink (Sub)
- Juken Sentai Gekiranger as Xia Fu
- Kamen Rider Kiva as Basshaa
- Engine Sentai Go-onger vs. Gekiranger as Geki Yellow
- Samurai Sentai Shinkenger as Shinken Pink (Sub)
- Samurai Sentai Shinkenger vs. Go-onger: GinmakuBang!! as Shinken Pink, Go-on Yellow
- Tensou Sentai Goseiger as Datas, Gosei Pink (Sub)
- Tensou Sentai Goseiger: Epic on the Movie as Datas
- Tensou Sentai Goseiger vs. Shinkenger: Epic on Ginmaku as Datas
- Kaizoku Sentai Gokaiger vs. Space Sheriff Gavan: The Movie as Gokai Pink
- Kamen Rider × Super Sentai: Super Hero Taisen as Gokai Pink
- Zyuden Sentai Kyoryuger as Luckyuro
- Ressha Sentai Toqger as Miss Gritta

== Partial other works ==
- Rittai Ninja Katsugeki Tenchu: Stealth Assassins as motion capture performer for Ayame as shown in the credits.
