= Godzilla vs. Charles Barkley =

1992 Nike television commercial

- Promotional poster
- Directed by: Michael Owens
- Starring: Charles Barkley
- Country of origin: United States
- Original language: English

Production
- Producer: Clint Goldman
- Cinematography: Kim Marks
- Editor: Bob Sarles
- Running time: 30 seconds
- Production company: Industrial Light & Magic

Original release
- Release: September 9, 1992

Godzilla vs. Charles Barkley is a 1992 Nike television commercial directed by Michael Owens. Produced by Industrial Light & Magic, the commercial featured a giant-sized version of NBA star Charles Barkley challenging Godzilla to a game of basketball in the streets of downtown Tokyo.

Wieden+Kennedy employees Warren Eakins and Steve Sandoz converted the idea of Barkley contending Godzilla after Nike revealed that Barkley's face would be featured on a pair of new Nike basketball sneakers. Industrial Light & Magic began production on the commercial after Nike, Wieden + Kennedy, Barkley, and Toho approved the proposal. The crew reconstructed the miniature set used for Ghostbusters II (1989) to resemble Tokyo for Barkley and Godzilla's confrontation. Principal photography ran eight days in June 1992, with editing taking four weeks.

Godzilla vs. Charles Barkley debuted in the United States on September 9, 1992, during the MTV Video Music Awards broadcast on MTV. The commercial was later adapted into a comic book.

== Synopsis ==
At the beginning of the commercial, Godzilla is rampaging through Tokyo when he hears Barkley dribbling a basketball. In response, the monster dons a pair of pink goggles and prepares for a basketball game, in which the two will use the O from a Tokyo sign on a building as their hoop. Godzilla knocks the ball from Barkley's hands with his tail, but Barkley retrieves it and pushes Godzilla into a building, clearing the path for an easy slam dunk. Afterwards, Barkley and Godzilla are seen walking through the streets together, with Barkley's arm on Godzilla's shoulder. Barkley tells Godzilla that "the Lakers are looking for a big man", and the spot concludes with the Nike swoosh logo. Another ending used in the commercial has Barkley asking Godzilla "Have you ever thought about wearing shoes?"

== Cast ==
- Charles Barkley as himself, a professional basketball player
- Ron Thiele as Godzilla, a giant reptilian monster

== Production ==
Wieden+Kennedy employees Warren Eakins and Steve Sandoz conceived of the idea of Charles Barkley contending Godzilla after Nike revealed that Barkley's face would be featured on a pair of new Nike basketball sneakers. Industrial Light & Magic began production on the commercial after Nike, Wieden + Kennedy, Barkley, and Toho approved the proposal.

It was originally intended for Japanese audiences, but Nike was impressed enough to use it in the United States, where it debuted on September 9, 1992, during the MTV Video Music Awards broadcast on MTV. Before the commercial's debut a trailer aired during the 1992 NBA All-Star Game.

The commercial required eight days of filming during the first two weeks in June 1992 and four weeks of editing thereafter. It employs suitmation techniques, which were still being used in the Godzilla films being made by Toho. Clint Goldman of ILM explained, "The idea was that we would show a modern look, but not with total 'ILM realism'. It just wouldn't be true to the subject matter." The Godzilla costume comprised many foam rubber pieces, and puppeteers produced the monster's facial expressions with radio control devices. The crew reconstructed the miniature set used for Ghostbusters II (1989) to resemble Tokyo for Barkley and Godzilla's confrontation. The special effects team used mattes to create the illusion of a larger city.

This commercial was the first television commercial to ever utilize 3D Audio. The Barnaby microphone invented by Jeff Gold of 3D.Audio was used by Jeff Roth of Focused Audio to create a basketball dribbling sound that would jump out of the speakers.

=== Crew ===
- Agency: Wieden & Kennedy, Portland
- Creatives: Warren Eakins and Steve Sandoz
- Agency Producer: John Adams
- Production Company: Industrial Light & Magic, San Rafael
- Director: Michael Owens
- Producer: Clint Goldman
- Director of Photography: Kim Marks
- Head of Creature Department: Jeff Mann
- Editor: Bob Sarles
- Sound Designer: Jeff Roth at Focused Audio, San Francisco
- 3D Audio (Barnaby Microphone): 3D.Audio
- Sound Mix Engineer: Jay Shilliday at Focused Audio, San Francisco

== Comic book adaptation ==
In December 1993, Dark Horse Comics released Godzilla vs. Barkley, a one-shot comic inspired by the commercial (although most of the action takes place in California rather than in Japan). The comic was written by Mike Baron with art by Jeff Butler and Keith Aiken.

== Bibliography ==
- "Top Spot". Shoot. September 11, 1992. 18.
- Tom Kenny. "Godzilla vs. Barkley in 3-D Sound". Mix. November 1992.
