= Takao Okawara =

Film writer, director and producer

Takao Okawara (大河原 孝夫, Ōkawara Takao; born December 20, 1949, in Tokyo) is a Japanese film director, writer, and producer.

== Biography ==
Most famous for his entries in the Heisei Godzilla series, Takao Okawara joined Tōhō in 1973, but would not get his first shot in the director's chair until 1980, when he joined Akira Kurosawa and Ishirō Honda on the film Kagemusha (1980). Four years later, he worked as an assistant director for the first Godzilla film of the Heisei series: The Return of Godzilla (1984). Okawara debuted as primary director seven years later on the film Reiko, the Psyche Resurrected (1991), which he also wrote. His most notable credit is perhaps the crafting the most profitable Godzilla film, Godzilla vs. Mothra, in 1992. The director stated that his work on the first film in the Millennium series, Godzilla 2000: Millennium (1999), would be his last for the series. It would also mark the end of his career at Tōhō.

== Filmography ==
Year	Title	Director	Notes
1973	Tidal Wave		Fourth assistant director
1974	Prophecies of Nostradamus		Fourth assistant director
1980	Kagemusha		Assistant director
1984	The Return of Godzilla		Chief assistant director
1987	Goodbye to the Girls		Chief assistant director
1989	My Phoenix		Assistant director
1989	Buddies		Assistant director
1991	Chōshōjo Reiko	Yes	Writer; Effects director
1992	Godzilla vs. Mothra	Yes	
1992	Bloody Scary Horror	Yes	
1993	Godzilla vs. Mechagodzilla II	Yes	
1994	Yamato Takeru	Yes	Effects director (uncredited)
1995	Godzilla vs. Destoroyah	Yes	
1997	Yukai	Yes	
1999	Godzilla 2000	Yes	Story (uncredited)
