= Godzilla =

Fictional monster, or kaiju

- Godzilla character
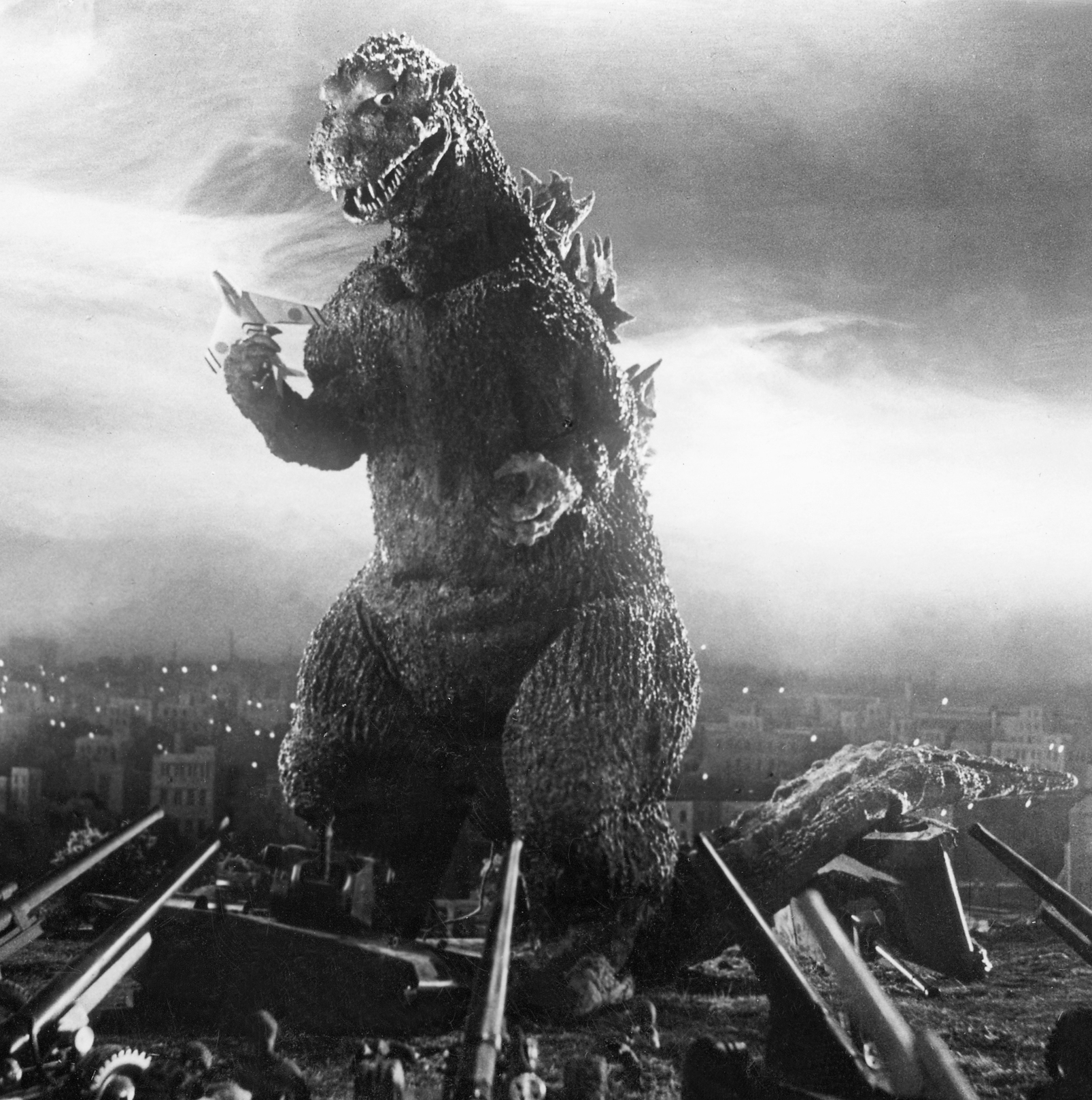
- Publicity still of Godzilla as portrayed via suitmation in Godzilla (1954)
- First appearance: Godzilla (1954)
- Created by: Tomoyuki Tanaka; Eiji Tsuburaya (Note: During a 2010 dispute with Honda's family over Godzilla's copyright ownership, Toho credited Tanaka and Kayama alone as the character's "authors".); Ishirō Honda; Shigeru Kayama
- Designed by: Akira Watanabe; Teizō Toshimitsu
- Portrayed by: Various: Shōwa era: Haruo Nakajima; Katsumi Tezuka; Hiroshi Sekida; Seiji Onaka; Shinji Takagi; Isao Zushi; Toru Kawai; Heisei era: Kenpachiro Satsuma; Hurricane Ryu (Adventure! Godzilland); Naoki Bandō (Get Going! Godzilland); TriStar Pictures: Kurt Carley; Millennium era: Tsutomu Kitagawa; Mizuho Yoshida
- Voiced by: Various: Shōwa era: Ted Thomas (Note: Thomas voiced Godzilla in the English dub of Godzilla vs. Gigan (1972).); Hanna-Barbera: Ted Cassidy (vocal effects); Heisei era: Yūko Mita (Get Going! Godzilland); TriStar Pictures: Frank Welker (vocal effects)
- Motion capture: Legendary Pictures: T. J. Storm; Reiwa era: Mansai Nomura

In-universe information
- Aliases: Gigantis; Monster Zero-One; Titanus Gojira
- Species: Prehistoric monster
- Family: Minilla and Godzilla Junior (adopted sons)

Godzilla (/ɡɒdˈzɪlə/ ɡod-ZIL-ə) (Note: Japanese: ゴジラ, Hepburn: Gojira; IPA: [ɡoꜜʑiɾa]) is a fictional giant monster, or daikaijū, that first appeared in the 1954 film of the same name, directed by Ishirō Honda. The character has since become an international pop culture icon, appearing in various media: 33 Japanese films by Toho, five American films, and numerous video games, novels, comic books, and television shows. Godzilla has been dubbed the King of the Monsters, an epithet first used in Godzilla, King of the Monsters! (1956), the American localization of the 1954 film.

Originally, the version of Godzilla in the 1954 Japanese film was 50 m tall. In other incarnations of the creature, Godzilla varies in height from 50 m to slightly more than 100 m tall (taller than high-rise buildings and as tall as skyscrapers). He is a prehistoric reptilian or dinosaurian monster that is amphibious or resides partially in the ocean, awakened and empowered after many years by exposure to nuclear radiation and nuclear testing. With the nuclear bombings of Hiroshima and Nagasaki and the Lucky Dragon 5 incident still fresh in the Japanese consciousness, Godzilla was conceived as a metaphor for nuclear weapons. Others have suggested that Godzilla is a metaphor for the United States, a "giant beast" woken from its "slumber" that then takes terrible vengeance on Japan. As the film series expanded, some storylines took on less serious undertones, portraying Godzilla as an antihero or lesser threat who defends humanity. Later films address disparate themes and commentary, including Japan's apathy, neglect, and ignorance of its imperial past; natural disasters; and the human condition.

Godzilla has been featured alongside many supporting characters and, over the decades, has faced off against various human opponents, such as the Japan Self-Defense Forces (JSDF), in addition to other gargantuan monsters, including Gigan, King Ghidorah, and Mechagodzilla. Godzilla has fought alongside allies such as Anguirus, Mothra, and Rodan and has had offsprings, including Godzilla Junior and Minilla. Godzilla has also battled characters and creatures from other franchises in crossover media—such as King Kong and even Charles Barkley—as well as various Marvel Comics characters, like S.H.I.E.L.D., the Fantastic Four, and the Avengers; as well as DC Comics characters such as the Justice League, the Legion of Doom, and the Green Lantern Corps.

== Development ==
=== Naming ===
Although the process of creating Godzilla's first film is comprehensively recorded, exactly how its name came to be remains unclear. The most widely accepted report of its origin is that producer Tomoyuki Tanaka named the monster after Toho employee Shirō Amikura, who was nicknamed "Gujira" (グジラ) then "Gojira" (ゴジラ), a portmanteau of the Japanese words gorira (ゴリラ, "gorilla") and kujira (鯨(クジラ), "whale"), because of his sturdy build and his fondness for whale meat. The account has been acknowledged by Toho themselves, director Ishirō Honda, producer Tanaka, special effects director Eiji Tsuburaya, producer Ichirō Satō, and production head Iwao Mori, with Satō and Mori recalling that the employee was Amikura. However, Honda's widow Kimi dismissed the story in a 1998 BBC documentary on Godzilla, believing that Honda, Tanaka, and Tsuburaya gave "considerable thought" to the name of the monster, stating, "the backstage boys at Toho loved to joke around with tall stories, but I don't believe that one". Honda's longtime assistant director Kōji Kajita added: "Those of us who were closest to them don't even know how and why they came up with Gojira."

Toho later translated the monster's Japanese name as "Godzilla" for overseas distribution. The first recorded foreign usage of "Godzilla" was printed in the Hawaii Tribune-Herald on November 20, 1955.

During the development of the American version of Godzilla Raids Again (1955), Godzilla's name was changed to "Gigantis" by producer Paul Schreibman, who wanted to create a character distinct from Godzilla.

=== Characterization ===
Within the context of the Japanese films, Godzilla's exact origins vary, but it is generally depicted as an enormous, violent, prehistoric sea monster awakened and empowered by nuclear radiation. Although the specific details of Godzilla's appearance have varied slightly over the years, the overall impression has remained consistent. Inspired by the fictional Rhedosaurus created by animator Ray Harryhausen for the film The Beast from 20,000 Fathoms, Godzilla's character design was conceived as that of an amphibious reptilian monster based around the loose concept of a dinosaur with an erect standing posture, scaly skin, an anthropomorphic torso with muscular arms, lobed bony plates along its back and tail, and a furrowed brow.

Art director Akira Watanabe combined attributes of a Tyrannosaurus, an Iguanodon, a Stegosaurus and an alligator to form a sort of blended chimera, inspired by illustrations from an issue of Life magazine. To emphasize the monster's relationship with the atomic bomb, its skin texture was inspired by the keloid scars seen on the survivors of Hiroshima. The basic design has a reptilian visage, a robust build, an upright posture, a long tail and three rows of serrated plates along the back. In the original film, the plates were added for purely aesthetic purposes, in order to further differentiate Godzilla from any other living or extinct creature. Godzilla is sometimes depicted as green in comics, cartoons, and movie posters, but the costumes used in the movies were usually painted charcoal gray with bone-white dorsal plates up until the film Godzilla 2000: Millennium.

In the original Japanese films, Godzilla and all the other monsters are referred to with gender-neutral pronouns equivalent to "it", while in the English dubbed versions, Godzilla is explicitly described as a male. In his book, Godzilla co-creator Tomoyuki Tanaka suggested that the monster was probably male; but also suggested that the original 1954 version could have been female. In the 1998 film Godzilla, the monster is referred to as a male and is depicted laying eggs through parthenogenesis. In the Legendary Pictures Godzilla films, Godzilla is specified as a male.

For the English translations for the Godzilla and Godzilla Raids Again novellas, writer Jeffrey Angles settled on male pronouns for Godzilla, stating that "Kayama [writer of the original novellas] thought about Godzilla as a stand-in for the nuclear bomb, and it was men in America who were developing the hydrogen bombs that frightened Japan so much in 1954. So maybe it's perhaps not inappropriate to call Godzilla 'he'." Angles also noted that Toho prefers to keep Godzilla and their other kaiju characters as gender-neutral as they see them more as objects akin to natural disasters.

Godzilla's allegiance and motivations, as well as its level of intelligence, have changed from film to film to suit the needs of the story. Although Godzilla does not like humans, it will fight alongside humanity against common threats. However, it makes no special effort to protect human life or property and will turn against its human allies on a whim. It is generally not motivated to attack by predatory instinct; it does not usually eat people and instead sustains itself on nuclear radiation and an omnivorous or piscivorian diet consisting especially of cetaceans and large fish. When inquired if Godzilla was "good or bad", producer Shōgo Tomiyama likened it to a Shinto "God of Destruction" which lacks moral agency and cannot be held to human standards of good and evil. "He totally destroys everything and then there is a rebirth. Something new and fresh can begin." Tomoyuki Tanaka noted in his book that Godzilla and humanity can become temporary allies against greater threats, but they are essentially enemies due to the difficulty to co-exist. Later Showa film's heroic and child-friendly representations of the character distancing from fears and destructions were controversial among their own filmmakers, such as by Ishiro Honda and Yukiko Takayama; the latter described the period a "sad era" for Godzilla for its heroic deeds, lacks of city destructions, and insufficient budgets.

==== Abilities ====
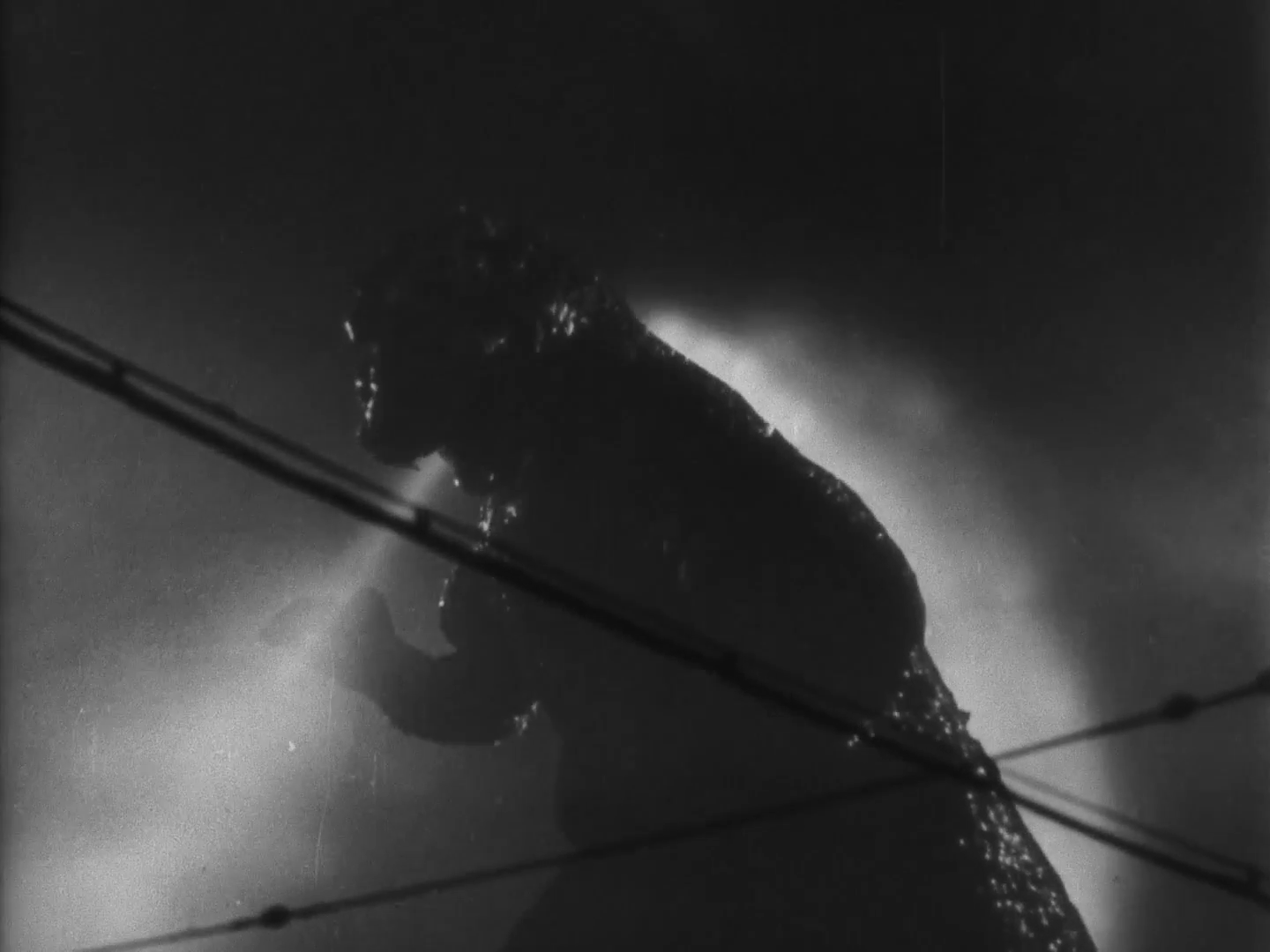
Godzilla using its atomic breath, as shown in Godzilla (1954)

Godzilla's signature weapon is its "atomic heat beam" (also known as "atomic breath"), nuclear energy that it generates inside of its body, uses electromagnetic force to concentrate it into a laser-like high velocity projectile and unleashes it from its jaws in the form of a blue or red radioactive beam. Toho's special effects department has used various techniques to render the beam, from physical gas-powered flames to hand-drawn or computer-generated fire. Godzilla is shown to possess immense physical strength and muscularity. Haruo Nakajima, the actor who played Godzilla in the original films, was a black belt in judo and used his expertise to choreograph the battle sequences.

Godzilla is amphibious: it has a preference for traversing Earth's hydrosphere when in hibernation or migration, can breathe underwater due to pore-shaped gills (a diegetic explanation for the costume's breathing holes) and is described in the original film by the character Dr. Yamane as a transitional form between a marine and a terrestrial reptile. Godzilla is shown to have great vitality: it is immune to conventional weaponry thanks to its rugged hide and ability to regenerate, and as a result of surviving a nuclear explosion, it cannot be destroyed by anything less powerful. One incarnation possesses an electromagnetic pulse-producing organ in its body which generates an asymmetrical permeable shield, making it impervious to all damage except for a short period when the organ recycles.

Various films have also depicted Godzilla with additional powers, such as an atomic pulse, magnetism, precognition, as well as flight. However non-canonical television shows, comics, and games have shown Godzilla using fireballs, converting electromagnetic energy into intensive body heat, converting shed blood into temporary tentacle limbs, an electric bite, superhuman speed, and laser beams emitted from its eyes.

==== Roar ====
"Godzilla Roar"
The original roar used in the 1954 film of the same name created by Akira Ifukube

Godzilla has a distinctive disyllabic roar (transcribed in several comics as Skreeeonk!), which was created by composer Akira Ifukube, who produced the sound by rubbing a pine tar-resin-coated glove along the string of a contrabass and then slowing down the playback. In the American version of Godzilla Raids Again (1955) titled Gigantis the Fire Monster (1959), Godzilla's roar was mostly substituted with that of the monster Anguirus. From The Return of Godzilla (1984) to Godzilla vs. King Ghidorah (1991), Godzilla was given a deeper and more threatening-sounding roar than in previous films, though this change was reverted from Godzilla vs. Mothra (1992) onward. For the 2014 American film, sound editors Ethan Van der Ryn and Erik Aadahl refused to disclose the source of the sounds used for their Godzilla's roar. Aadahl described the two syllables of the roar as representing two different emotional reactions, with the first expressing fury and the second conveying the character's soul.

==== Size ====
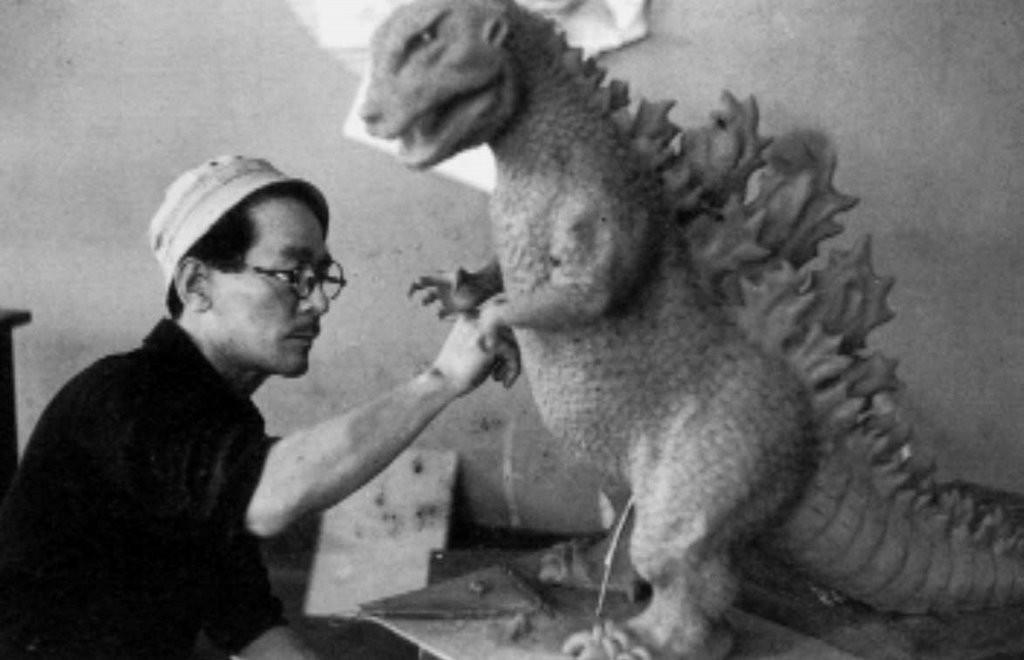
Teizō Toshimitsu sculpting a prototype for Godzilla's design

Godzilla's size is inconsistent, changing from film to film and even from scene to scene for the sake of artistic license. The miniature sets and costumes were typically built at a 1/25–1/50 scale and filmed at 240 frames per second to create the illusion of great size. In the original 1954 film, Godzilla was scaled to be 50 m (164 ft) tall. This was done so Godzilla could just peer over the largest buildings in Tokyo at the time. In the 1956 American version, Godzilla is estimated to be 121.9 m (400 ft) tall, because producer Joseph E. Levine felt that 50 m did not sound "powerful enough".

As the series progressed, Toho would rescale the character, eventually making Godzilla as tall as 100 m (328 ft). This was done so that it would not be dwarfed by the newer, bigger buildings in Tokyo's skyline, such as the 243-metre-tall (797 ft) Tokyo Metropolitan Government Building which Godzilla destroyed in the film Godzilla vs. King Ghidorah (1991). Supplementary information, such as character profiles, would also depict Godzilla as weighing between 20,000 and 60,000 metric tons (22,050 and 66,140 short tons).

In the American film Godzilla (2014) from Legendary Pictures, Godzilla was scaled to be 108.2 m (355 ft) and weighing 90,000 short tons (81,650 metric tons), making it the largest film version at that time. Director Gareth Edwards wanted Godzilla "to be so big as to be seen from anywhere in the city, but not too big that he couldn't be obscured". For Shin Godzilla (2016), Godzilla was made even taller than the Legendary version, at 118.5 m (389 ft). In Godzilla: Planet of the Monsters (2017), Godzilla's height was increased further still to 300 m (984 ft). In Godzilla: King of the Monsters (2019) and Godzilla vs. Kong (2021), Godzilla's height was increased to 119.8 m (393 ft) from the 2014 incarnation.

== Special effects ==
Godzilla's appearance has traditionally been portrayed in the films by an actor wearing a latex costume, though the character has also been rendered in animatronic, stop-motion and computer-generated form. Taking inspiration from King Kong, special effects artist Eiji Tsuburaya had initially wanted Godzilla to be portrayed via stop-motion, but prohibitive deadlines and a lack of experienced animators in Japan at the time made suitmation more practical.

=== Practical effects ===
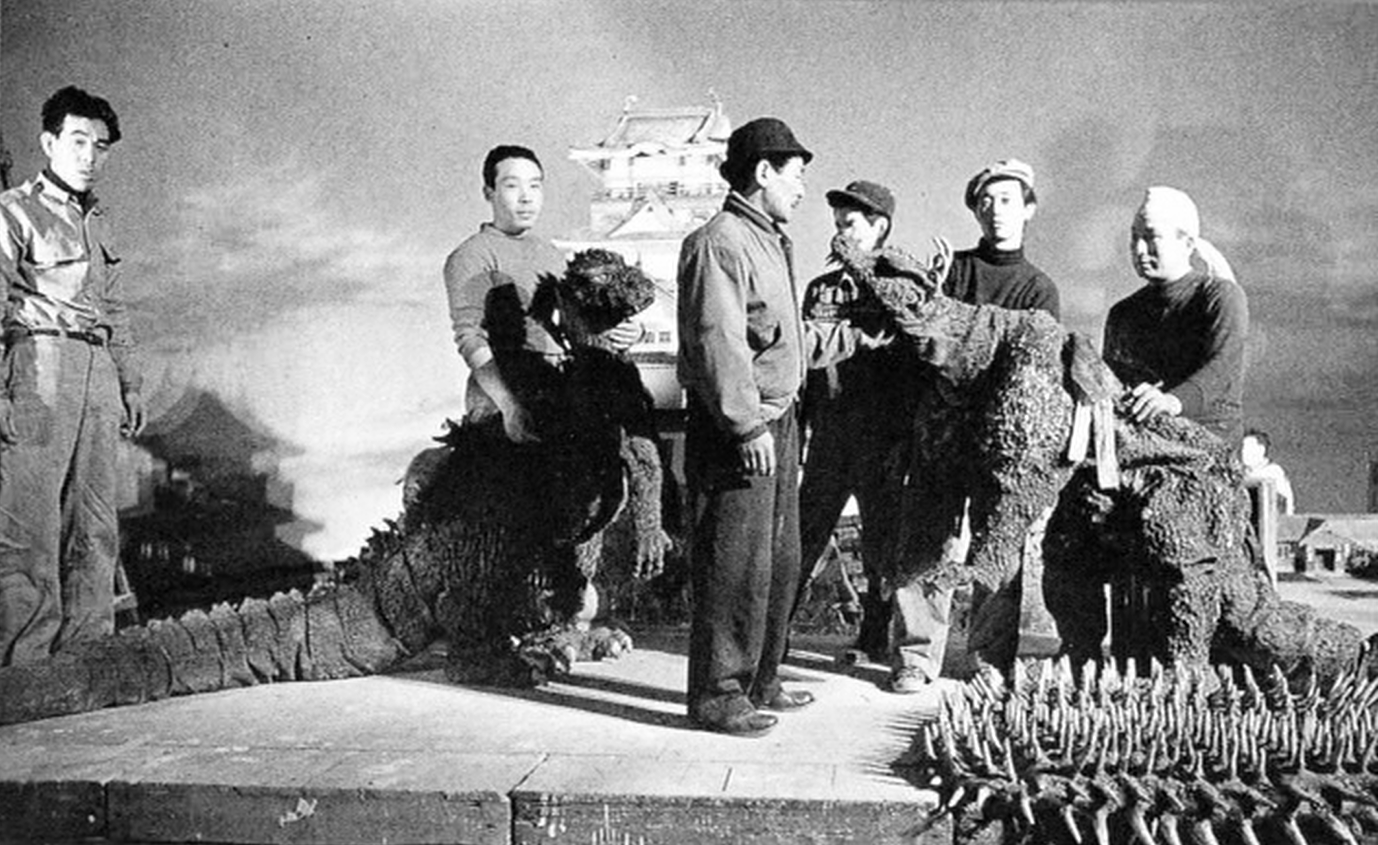
Suit fitting on the set of Godzilla Raids Again (1955), with Haruo Nakajima portraying Godzilla on the left

The first suit, weighing in excess of 100 kg (220 lb), consisted of a body cavity made of thin wires and bamboo wrapped in chicken wire for support and covered in fabric and cushions, which were then coated in latex. It was held together by small hooks on the back, though subsequent Godzilla suits incorporated a zipper. Prior to 1984, most Godzilla suits were made from scratch, thus resulting in slight design changes in each film appearance. The most notable changes from 1962 to 1975 were the reduction in Godzilla's number of toes and the removal of the character's external ears and prominent fangs, features which would all later be reincorporated in the Godzilla designs from The Return of Godzilla (1984) onward. The most consistent Godzilla design was maintained from Godzilla vs. Biollante (1989) to Godzilla vs. Destoroyah (1995), when the suit was given a cat-like face and double rows of teeth.

Several suit actors had difficulties in performing as Godzilla due to the suits' weight, lack of ventilation and diminished visibility. Haruo Nakajima, who portrayed Godzilla from 1954 to 1972, said the materials used to make the 1954 suit (rubber, plastic, cotton, and latex) were hard to find after World War II. The suit weighed 100 kilograms after its completion and required two men to help Nakajima put it on. When he first put it on, he sweated so heavily that his shirt was soaked within seconds. Kenpachiro Satsuma in particular, who portrayed Godzilla from 1984 to 1995, described how the Godzilla suits he wore were even heavier and hotter than their predecessors because of the incorporation of animatronics. Satsuma himself suffered numerous medical issues during his tenure, including oxygen deprivation, near-drowning, concussions, electric shocks and lacerations to the legs from the suits' steel wire reinforcements wearing through the rubber padding. The ventilation problem was partially solved in the suit used in 1994's Godzilla vs. SpaceGodzilla, which was the first to include an air duct that allowed suit actors to last longer during performances. In Godzilla (1998), several scenes had the monster portrayed by stuntmen in suits similar to those used in the Toho films, with the actors' heads being located in the monster's neck region and the facial movements controlled via animatronics. However, because of the creature's horizontal posture, the stuntmen had to wear metal leg extenders, which allowed them to stand two metres (six feet) off the ground with their feet bent forward. Kurt Carley performed the suitmation sequences for the adult Godzilla.

In The Return of Godzilla (1984), some scenes made use of a 16-foot high robotic Godzilla (dubbed the "Cybot Godzilla") for use in close-up shots of the creature's head. The Cybot Godzilla consisted of a hydraulically powered mechanical endoskeleton covered in urethane skin containing 3,000 computer operated parts which permitted it to tilt its head and move its lips and arms. For Godzilla (1998), the film's special effects crew built a 1/6 scale animatronic Godzilla for close-up scenes, whose size outmatched that of Stan Winston's "Rexy" in Jurassic Park.

=== CGI ===
In Godzilla (1998), special effects artist Patrick Tatopoulos was instructed to redesign Godzilla as an incredibly fast runner. At one point, it was planned to use motion capture from a human to create the movements of the computer-generated Godzilla, but it was said to have ended up looking too much like a man in a suit. Tatopoulos subsequently reimagined the creature as a lean, digitigrade bipedal, iguana-like creature that stood with its back and tail parallel to the ground, rendered via CGI.

In Godzilla (2014), the character was portrayed entirely via CGI. Godzilla's design in the reboot was intended to stay true to that of the original series, though the film's special effects team strove to make the monster "more dynamic than a guy in a big rubber suit." To create a CG version of Godzilla, the Moving Picture Company (MPC) studied various animals such as bears, Komodo dragons, lizards, lions and wolves, which helped the visual effects artists visualize Godzilla's body structure, like that of its underlying bone, fat and muscle structure, as well as the thickness and texture of its scales. Motion capture was also used for some of Godzilla's movements. T. J. Storm provided the performance capture for Godzilla by wearing sensors in front of a green screen. Storm reprised the role of Godzilla in Godzilla: King of the Monsters, portraying the character through performance capture.

In Shin Godzilla, a majority of the character was portrayed via CGI, with Mansai Nomura portraying Godzilla through motion capture. In 2024, Godzilla Minus One was nominated for the Academy Award for Best Visual Effects, becoming the first Godzilla film nominated for an Oscar. At the 96th Academy Awards ceremony, it won the award.

== Cultural impact ==
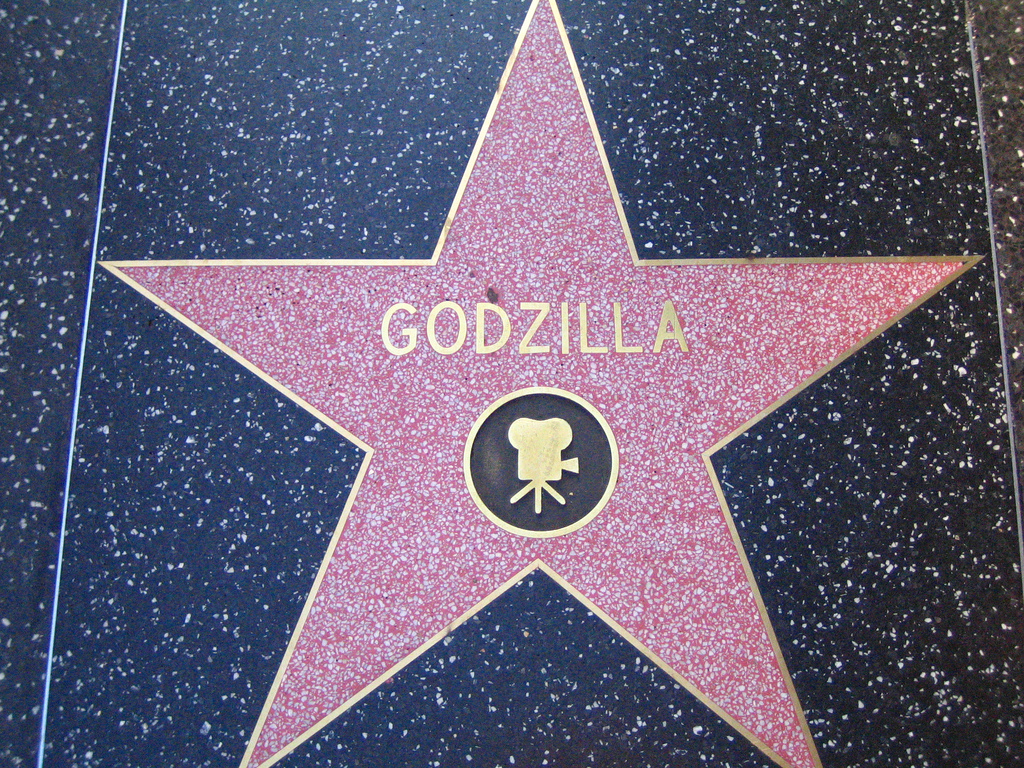
Godzilla's star on the Hollywood Walk of Fame

Godzilla is one of the most recognizable symbols of Japanese popular culture worldwide and remains an important facet of Japanese films, embodying the kaiju subset of the tokusatsu genre. Godzilla's vaguely humanoid appearance and strained, lumbering movements endeared it to Japanese audiences, who could relate to Godzilla as a sympathetic character, despite its wrathful nature. Audiences respond positively to the character because it acts out of rage and self-preservation and shows where science and technology can go wrong.

In 1967, the Keukdong Entertainment Company of South Korea, with production assistance from Toei Company, produced Yongary, Monster from the Deep, a reptilian monster who invades South Korea to consume oil. The film and character has often been branded as an imitation of Godzilla.

Godzilla has been considered a filmographic metaphor for the United States, as well as an allegory of nuclear weapons in general. The earlier Godzilla films, especially the original, portrayed Godzilla as a frightening nuclear-spawned monster. Godzilla represented the fears that many Japanese held about the atomic bombings of Hiroshima and Nagasaki and the possibility of recurrence.

As the series progressed, so did Godzilla, changing into a less destructive and more heroic character. Ghidorah (1964) was the turning point in Godzilla's transformation from villain to hero, by pitting him against a greater threat to humanity, King Ghidorah. Godzilla has since been viewed as an anti-hero. Roger Ebert cited Godzilla as a notable example of a villain-turned-hero, along with King Kong, Jaws (James Bond), the Terminator and John Rambo.

Godzilla is considered "the original radioactive superhero" due to his accidental radioactive origin story predating Spider-Man (1962 debut), though Godzilla did not become a hero until Ghidorah in 1964. By the 1970s, Godzilla came to be viewed as a superhero, with the magazine King of the Monsters in 1977 describing Godzilla as "Superhero of the '70s." Godzilla had surpassed Superman and Batman to become "the most universally popular superhero of 1977" according to Donald F. Glut. Godzilla was also voted the most popular movie monster in The Monster Times poll in 1973, beating Count Dracula, King Kong, the Wolf Man, the Mummy, the Creature from the Black Lagoon and the Frankenstein Monster.

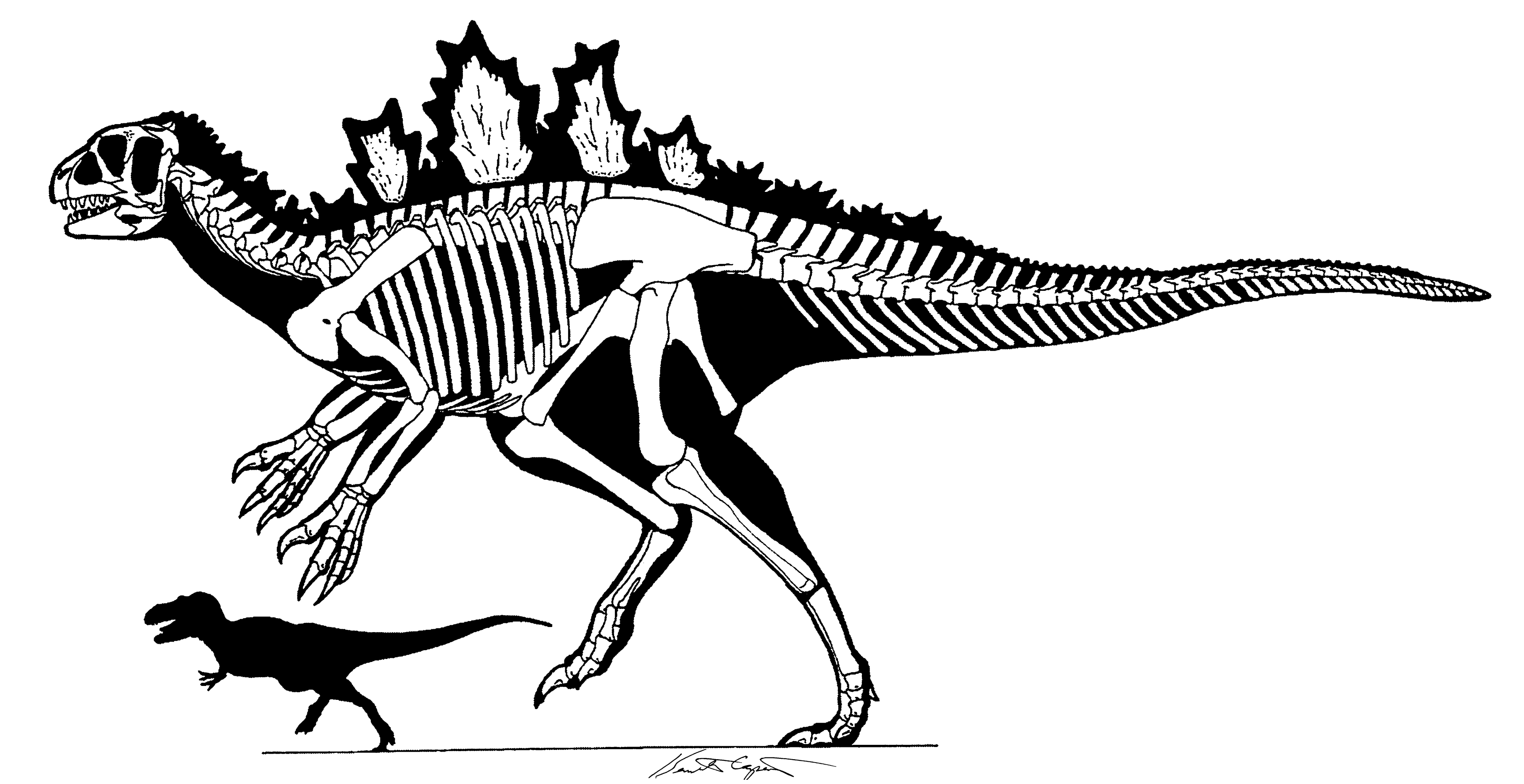
Paleontologist Kenneth Carpenter's skeletal diagram of Godzilla in a modern dinosaur posture

In 1996, Godzilla received the MTV Lifetime Achievement Award, as well as being given a star on the Hollywood Walk of Fame in 2004 to celebrate the premiere of the character's 50th anniversary film, Godzilla: Final Wars. Godzilla's pop-cultural impact has led to the creation of numerous parodies and tributes, as seen in media such as Bambi Meets Godzilla, which was ranked as one of the "50 greatest cartoons", two episodes of Mystery Science Theater 3000 and the song "Godzilla" by Blue Öyster Cult. Godzilla has also been used in advertisements, such as in a commercial for Nike, where Godzilla lost an oversized one-on-one game of basketball to a giant version of NBA player Charles Barkley. The commercial was subsequently adapted into a comic book illustrated by Jeff Butler. Godzilla has also appeared in a commercial for Snickers candy bars, which served as an indirect promo for the 2014 film. Godzilla's success inspired the creation of numerous other monster characters, such as Gamera, Reptilicus of Denmark, Yonggary of South Korea, Pulgasari of North Korea, Gorgo of the United Kingdom and the Cloverfield monster of the United States. Dakosaurus is an extinct sea crocodile of the Jurassic Period, which researchers informally nicknamed "Godzilla". Paleontologists have written tongue-in-cheek speculative articles about Godzilla's biology, with Kenneth Carpenter tentatively classifying it as a ceratosaur based on its skull shape, four-fingered hands, and dorsal scutes and paleontologist Darren Naish expressing skepticism, while commenting on Godzilla's unusual morphology.

Godzilla's ubiquity in pop culture has led to the mistaken assumption that the character is in the public domain, resulting in litigation by Toho to protect their corporate asset from becoming a generic trademark. In April 2008, Subway depicted a giant monster in a commercial for their Five Dollar Footlongs sandwich promotion. Toho filed a lawsuit against Subway for using the character without permission, demanding $150,000 in compensation. In February 2011, Toho sued Honda for depicting a fire-breathing monster in a commercial for the Honda Odyssey. The monster was never mentioned by name, being seen briefly on a video screen inside the minivan. The Sea Shepherd Conservation Society christened a vessel the MV Gojira. Its purpose is to target and harass Japanese whalers in defense of whales in the Southern Ocean Whale Sanctuary. The MV Gojira was renamed the MV Brigitte Bardot in May 2011, due to legal pressure from Toho. Gojira is the name of a French death metal band, formerly known as Godzilla; legal problems forced the band to change their name. In May 2015, Toho launched a lawsuit against Voltage Pictures over a planned picture starring Anne Hathaway. Promotional material released at the Cannes Film Festival used images of Godzilla.

Steven Spielberg cited Godzilla as an inspiration for Jurassic Park (1993), specifically Godzilla, King of the Monsters! (1956), which he grew up watching. Spielberg described Godzilla as "the most masterful of all the dinosaur movies because it made you believe it was really happening." Godzilla also influenced the Spielberg film Jaws (1975). Godzilla has also been cited as an inspiration by filmmakers Martin Scorsese and Tim Burton.

A carnivorous dinosaur from the Triassic period was named Gojirasaurus in 1997. The main-belt asteroid 101781 Gojira, discovered by American astronomer Roy Tucker at the Goodricke-Pigott Observatory in 1999, was named in honor of the creature. The official naming citation was published by the Minor Planet Center on July 11, 2018 (M.P.C. 110635). The largest megamullion, located 600 kilometers to the south-east of Okinotorishima, the southernmost Japanese island, is named the Godzilla Megamullion. The Japan Coast Guard played a role in name, reaching an agreement with Toho. Toho's Chief Godzilla officer Keiji Ota stated that "I am truly honored that (the megamullion) bears Godzilla's name, the Earth's most powerful monster."

In a 2007 interview, Japanese defense minister Shigeru Ishiba said that he would mobilize the Japan Self-Defense Forces in response to an appearance by Godzilla.

=== Cultural ambassador ===
In April 2015, the Shinjuku ward of Tokyo named Godzilla a special resident and official tourism ambassador to encourage tourism. During an unveiling of a giant Godzilla bust at Toho headquarters, Shinjuku mayor Kenichi Yoshizumi stated, "Godzilla is a character that is the pride of Japan." The mayor extended a residency certificate to an actor in a rubber suit representing Godzilla, but as the suit's hands were not designed for grasping, it was accepted on Godzilla's behalf by a Toho executive. Reporters noted that Shinjuku's ward has been flattened by Godzilla in three Toho movies.
