= Minilla =

Fictional monster; adopted son of Godzilla

- Godzilla character
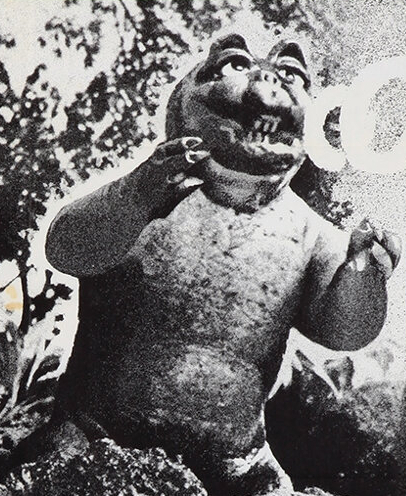
- Minilla as portrayed by Masao Fukazawa via suitmation in All Monsters Attack (1969)
- First appearance: Son of Godzilla (1967)
- Last appearance: Chibi Godzilla Raids Again (2024)
- Created by: Jun Fukuda; Tomoyuki Tanaka
- Portrayed by: Shōwa era: Masao Fukazawa; Millennium era: Naoko Kamio
- Voiced by: Midori Uchiyama (All Monsters Attack); Riley Jackson (Godzilla's Revenge); Maaya Uchida (Chibi Godzilla Raids Again)

In-universe information
- Alias: Minya
- Species: Prehistoric amphibious reptile
- Gender: Male; Female (Chibi Minilla only)
- Family: Godzilla (adoptive father)

Minilla (Japanese: ミニラ, Hepburn: Minira) is a monster, or kaiju, who first appeared in Toho's 1967 film Son of Godzilla. It is an adopted child of Godzilla, and is sometimes referenced as Minya in the American dubbed versions.

== Overview ==
=== Development ===
According to director Jun Fukuda, Minilla's creation was not an attempt at appealing to child audiences, but was merely a new approach for the series. After filming Ebirah, Horror of the Deep, Godzilla creator Tomoyuki Tanaka reportedly approached screenwriter Shinichi Sekizawa and suggested the idea of giving Godzilla a child to commemorate the New Year. According to Godzilla historian Steve Ryfle, the character's creation was likely a response to the contemporary light-hearted Gamera films.

=== Shōwa era (1967–1969) ===
In its debut film, Son of Godzilla, Minilla was born on Sollgel Island, when its egg was prematurely cracked open by a group of mutant giant mantises called Kamacuras. Godzilla soon arrived, killed two of the Kamacuras, and rescued Minilla. Godzilla proceeded to train Minilla and defended it against further attacks from the final Kamacuras and the giant spider Kumonga. Godzilla and Minilla were placed in hibernation when a group of scientists completed a weather experiment, resulting in the freezing of their island. The monsters were revived when the snow melted, and eventually relocated to Monster Island, as seen via stock footage in Godzilla vs. Gigan.

In Destroy All Monsters, Minilla, Godzilla, and many other Earth monsters live on a new island called Monsterland. Together, they battle King Ghidorah summoned by Kilaaks at Mount Fuji. They kill Ghidorah and save planet Earth from Kilaaks. After, Minilla and the other monsters return to Monsterland.

In All Monsters Attack, Minilla is bullied by a mutant amphibian monster named Gabara, but Minilla defeats Gabara in teamwork with Godzilla. Minilla appears in Ichiro's dream.

In Godzilla vs. Gigan, Minilla only shows up in the film via stock footage.

=== Millennium era (2004) ===
After a 34-year absence, Minilla returns in Godzilla: Final Wars. In the film, Minilla accompanies Kenta and Samon Taguchi on an adventure around Japan after it was found by them in Aokigahara during Xillien invasion. During Godzilla battles against Xillien-controlled Rodan, Anguirus and King Caesar, it grows to about half the size of the adult Godzilla. Minilla arrives at ruined Tokyo after Godzilla defeated Keizer Ghidorah and stops Godzilla from killing its human attackers. Minilla bids farewell to Kenta, Samon and the Gotengo's crew and leaves with Godzilla into the ocean.

=== Other appearances ===
The children's web-series Godziban has Minilla and Little Godzilla (who, in this series, goes by simply 'Little') co-existing as Godzilla's children, embarking on many misadventures while Godzilla tries to teach them important monster skills.

In Chibi Godzilla Raids Again, a genderbend version of Minilla is depicted as Chibi Godzilla's younger sister and the colossal Godzilla's second child.

== Reception ==
Minilla is often regarded as one of the most hated Godzilla monsters by most of the Godzilla fandom, with some people depicting him as being "ugly", "annoying" and "useless".

== Appearances ==
=== Films ===
- Son of Godzilla (1967)
- Destroy All Monsters (1968)
- All Monsters Attack (1969)
- Godzilla: Final Wars (2004)

=== Television ===
- Ike! Greenman (1973–1974)
- Godziban (2019–present)
- Chibi Godzilla Raids Again (2024–present)

=== Video games ===
- Godzilla / Godzilla-Kun: Kaijuu Daikessen (Game Boy – 1990) – In the game, Minilla is trapped in a large maze. He awaits rescue by Godzilla, the player's character. The only point in which Minilla appears is during the ending sequence.
- Godzilla Trading Battle (PlayStation – 1998)
- Godzilla Generations (Dreamcast – 1998) – A secret character that is unlocked after completing the game with Godzilla-USA, Minilla is the shortest of the playable characters and also the weakest in terms of defense. His speed is average, and his breath weapon, atomic smoke rings, is not very powerful, as several uses are required to defeat even the Super X.
- Godzilla Battle Line (2021)

== Other juvenile Godzillas ==
- Godzooky, Godzilla's nephew from the 1978-81 animated television series Godzilla.
- Godzilla Junior (also referred to as Little Godzilla and Baby Godzilla), Godzilla's son from Heisei era, introduced in the 1993 film Godzilla vs. Mechagodzilla II.
- Baby Godzillas and Godzilla, from the 1998 film Godzilla and the 1998–2000 animated television series Godzilla: The Series.
- Chibi Godzilla, colossal Godzilla's son from Chibi Godzilla Raids Again.
