= Godzilland =

Japanese educational television series

- VHS cover of an OVA release

ゴジランド (Gojirando)
- Genre: Educational, trivia, comedy
- Anime television series
- Studio: Toho Animation
- Original network: TV Tokyo
- Original run: 1992 – 1993
- Original video animation
- Directed by: Seinosuke Tanaka; Tadashi Nakayama
- Music by: Takashi Fujiwara
- Studio: Toho; Film Magic ("Hiragana & Counting"); Group TAC ("Addition & Subtraction")
- Licensed by: Gakken Video
- Released: November 6, 1994 – July 20, 1996
- Episodes: 4

Godzilland (ゴジランド, Gojirando), or Godzillaland, refers to two series of Japanese children's educational television series produced by Toho and based on the Godzilla franchise. These include Adventure! Godzilland (1992 & 1993 / 2 seasons / 26 episodes) and Get Going! Godzilland (1994 & 1996 / 4 vhs released OVAs). The first season of the first series, a trivia show titled Adventure! Godzilland (冒険！ゴジランド, Bōken! Gojirando), aired on TV Tokyo in 1992. The series was intended to promote the film Godzilla vs. Mothra, and features both live-action and chibi-style animated segments. It also features musical numbers, including one that doubles as an aerobic exercise. Toho then produced a second series, Adventure! Godzilland 2 (冒険！ゴジランド2, Bōken! Gojirando Tsū), which aired in 1993 as a promotion for Godzilla vs. Mechagodzilla II.

These were followed by Get Going! Godzilland (すすめ！ゴジランド, Susume! Gojirando), a series of four OVAs released on VHS between 1994 and 1996 by Gakken Video. Get Going! Godzilland is aimed at teaching children how to read the hiragana alphabet, how to count and how to perform addition and subtraction.
