= Godzilla Junior =

Kaiju from Godzilla franchise

- Godzilla character
- Baby Godzilla (left), Little Godzilla (middle) and Godzilla Junior (right)
- First appearance: Godzilla vs. Mechagodzilla II (1993)
- Last appearance: Godzilla vs. Destoroyah (1995)
- Created by: Wataru Mimura; Takao Okawara
- Portrayed by: Hurricane Ryu; Little Frankie

In-universe information
- Aliases: Baby Godzilla; Little Godzilla; Godzilla Jr.; Junior; Little one (Note: Godzilla Jr. is nicknamed "Little one" in the English dubs.)
- Species: Mutated Dinosaur
- Family: Godzilla (Adoptive father)

Godzilla Junior (Japanese: ゴジラジュニア, Hepburn: Gojira Junia), also referred to as Baby Godzilla and Little Godzilla, is a juvenile monster, or kaiju, which first appeared in Toho's 1993 film Godzilla vs. Mechagodzilla II.

== Overview ==
=== Development ===
During the production of Godzilla vs. Mechagodzilla II, the decision to introduce a character similar to Godzilla's first adopted child, Minilla, was made in order to appeal to the largely female audience that made Godzilla vs. Mothra a financial success, despite objections by director Takao Okawara, who held a low opinion of the 1960s movies the character had previously been featured in. Okawara redesigned the new Baby Godzilla as more dinosaur-like than its predecessor, but strove to make it physically appealing in order to contrast it with the more brutish-looking Mechagodzilla. Baby Godzilla was portrayed by Hurricane Ryu, who wore a full-body suit with an animatronic mouth and eyes. The skin was also made smoother than Godzilla's in order to imply that Baby Godzilla had yet to be exposed to the mutagenic radiation that transformed its father. According to Godzilla suit actor Kenpachiro Satsuma, Godzilla Junior was not intended to be the literal son of Godzilla, but "the baby of a cousin." In an early draft for the film, Godzilla would have had soldiers injected into its bloodstream, who would then trigger a nuclear meltdown which would have killed the monster, only to have the radiation absorbed by Baby Godzilla, who would have grown into a new adult Godzilla and subsequently defeated Mechagodzilla.

In Godzilla vs. SpaceGodzilla, special effects artist Koichi Kawakita redesigned the young Godzilla as a more cartoonish character, having disliked the character's previously more dinosaurian appearance. It was rumoured that Kawakita intended to use the new design in a children's spinoff TV special entitled Little Godzilla's Underground Adventure. However, this was nothing more than a myth. The Little Godzilla incarnation was portrayed by "Little Frankie", a professional midget wrestler.

During the development of what would become Godzilla vs. Destoroyah, it was proposed to have Godzilla face off with Ghost Godzilla, the spirit of the original 1954 Godzilla, who would possess Godzilla Junior and force it to fight Godzilla, though this idea was scrapped. Hurricane Ryu returned as Godzilla Junior and portrayed it via traditional suitmation techniques, though because the Junior suit was almost the same size as the main Godzilla one, a small animatronic prop was used in scenes where Junior interacts with its "father".

== Character's biography ==
=== Godzilla vs. Mechagodzilla II (1993) ===
Godzilla Junior first appears in Godzilla vs. Mechagodzilla II as an egg. Presuming it to be a Pteranodon egg, a scientific team unearths it from Adona Island and ships it to Japan for study. The egg displays strange psychic properties, even imprinting itself upon the biologist Azusa Gojo, before finally hatching to reveal an infant Godzillasaurus. When Godzilla later appears, having sought out Baby Godzilla through an unexplained psychic link, Baby Godzilla leaves with Godzilla, later settling on Baas Island.

=== Godzilla vs. SpaceGodzilla (1994) ===
By the time of Godzilla vs. SpaceGodzilla, Baby Godzilla, now rechristened Little Godzilla, periodically interacts with the human characters for a portion of the film, taking a particular liking to Major Yuki of G-Force and establishing a psychic bond with Miki Saegusa. Little Godzilla is imprisoned in a cage of crystals by SpaceGodzilla upon its arrival on Earth and remains caged until SpaceGodzilla's defeat by the combined might of Godzilla and M.O.G.U.E.R.A.

=== Godzilla vs. Destoroyah (1995) ===
Little Godzilla continues to grow and is renamed Godzilla Junior in Godzilla vs. Destoroyah. Junior quickly proves itself to be a fighter, successfully defeating Destoroyah, though with difficulty. Junior is killed during its second battle against Destoroyah at Haneda Airport, where Godzilla and Destoroyah soon fight. After Godzilla melts down, Junior is revived and grows into a new adult Godzilla.

== Appearances ==
=== Films ===
- Godzilla vs. Mechagodzilla II (1993) - as Baby Godzilla
- Godzilla vs. SpaceGodzilla (1994) - as Little Godzilla
- Godzilla vs. Destoroyah (1995) - as Godzilla Junior

=== Television ===
- Godzilla Island (1997–1998) - as Godzilla Junior
- Godziban (2019-present) - as Little

=== Video games ===
- Godzilla Trading Battle (PlayStation – 1998) - as Little Godzilla and Godzilla Junior

=== Literature ===
- Godzilla vs. Mechagodzilla II (Manga – 1993) – as Baby Godzilla
- Godzilla vs. Spacegodzilla (Manga – 1994) – as Little Godzilla
- Godzilla vs. Destoroyah (Manga – 1995) – as Godzilla Junior

== See also ==
- Minilla

== Bibliography ==
- Skipper, Graham (2022). Godzilla: The Official Guide to the King of the Monsters (in English and Japanese). Welbeck Publishing. p. 219. ISBN 9781802790009.
- Burns, William (2016-08-28). The Thrill of Repulsion: Excursions into Horror Culture. Schiffer Publishing. ISBN 9781507301616.
