= Post-vacation blues =

- Other names: Post-holiday blues
- Symptoms: Tiredness, loss of appetite, anxious, nostalgia, depression, stress
- Causes: Returning home or to a normal routine from a long vacation
- Treatment: Time
- Frequency: 57% of travellers

Post-vacation blues (Canada and US), post-holiday blues (UK, Ireland, and some Commonwealth countries), or post-travel depression (PTD) is a type of mood that people returning from a long trip (usually a vacation) may experience.

== Background ==
A person may suffer from post-vacation blues after returning home or to a normal routine from a long vacation, especially if it was a pleasurable one. The longer a trip lasts, the more intense the post-vacation blues may be. This is because after some people return home, they realize how boring and unsatisfactory their normal lifestyle is when compared to the activities they did while on their vacation. It is easier to re-adjust to a normal routine the shorter the trip was. Post-vacation blues may result in tiredness, loss of appetite, strong feelings of nostalgia, and in some cases, depression. Jet lag may intensify the post-vacation blues.

According to an article in The Mirror, 57% of British travellers reported experiencing post-holiday blues.

== Treatment ==
In general, post-vacation blues will wear off over time. It usually takes a few days, but in extreme cases, the mood can last for several weeks before wearing off. Faster ways of treating post-vacation blues are for the person to share experiences with family and friends or to look at photos and souvenirs. Some people may find comfort in incorporating vacation activities into their regular routines. Another well-known method of curing post-vacation blues is to plan or book something leisurely or a social activity as this offers a distraction and also provides the person something to look forward to.

Addressing post-vacation blues involves maintaining consistency in daily routines and practicing mindfulness, as per Psychology Today. A regular schedule with self-care activities, like exercise and meditation, can extend a vacation's positive impact. Additionally, mindfulness focusing on present experiences reduces stress.

== Similar moods ==
- Spring fever
- In Japan, a phenomenon known as gogatsu-byou (五月病, literally "May sickness") leaves some people feeling depressed a month after they started a new school year or new job, as their expectations were not met.

== See also ==
- Human factors
- Human reliability
- Seasonal affective disorder
- Homesickness
- Nostalgia
