= Franz Gruber (actor) =

American actor

Franz Gruber (born February 10, 1930) is an American actor mostly known for having played in Japanese Tokusatsu movie/TV productions (e.g. Ultraman, Ultra Seven, Mighty Jack).

== Life ==
Gruber was born in New York City in 1930. He was the son of German-American doctor Fredrick Gruber (1883-1960) and his wife Maria (1886-1961). Franz attended Columbia University and graduated in 1949. After getting a job as a journalist for The New York Times, Franz traveled to Japan to wrote about Japanese culture and religion. In 1957, he starting his filming career and played the foreign character in many kaiju films. His acting career lasted from 1963 to 1974. Returning to the USA, he became a teacher at Brooklyn College Academy until he retired in 1989. He married Jennie Rosa in 1955 and has two children (Mark 1960 and Elizabeth 1962).

== Filmography ==
- A Whirlwind Child Called by The Wind (風が呼んでる旋風児, Nikkatsu 1963) as Anderson
- Terror Beneath the Sea (海底大戦争 Toei 1966) as Colonel Brown
- The X from Outer Space (宇宙大怪獣ギララ, Shochiku 1967) as Dr. Berman
- Rikugun Nakano gakko: Mitsumei (陸軍中野学校 密命, Daiei 1967) as German Embassy, Colonel Winkler
- Polizeifunk ruft (TV Episode 2.13: Flucht nach Kyoto, NWF 1968) as Hans Hauser
- Genocide (昆虫大戦争, Shochiku 1968) as Military doctor
- Gamera vs. Jiger (ガメラ対大魔獣ジャイガ, Daiei 1970) as Dr. William
- Kamikaze Cop, The Poison Gas Affair International Secret Police : Death Gas (やくざ刑事 恐怖の毒ガス, Toei 1971) as Bormann's heart
- Tidal Wave (日本沈没, Toho, 1970) as United Nations member (USA)
- Prophecies of Nostradamus (ノストラダムスの大予言, Toho 1974) as Frank
- ESPY (エスパイ, Toho 1974) as Anti-ESPY C
