= Yoshimitsu Banno =

Japanese film director

- 坂野 義光
- Banno in 1971
- Born: March 30, 1931; Imabari, Ehime, Japan
- Died: May 7, 2017 (aged 86); Kawasaki, Japan
- Occupations: Director, screenwriter, producer

Yoshimitsu Banno (坂野 義光, Banno Yoshimitsu; March 30, 1931 – May 7, 2017) was a Japanese film director, best known for the cult-classic Godzilla vs. Hedorah (1971), which he directed and co-wrote. Banno was a special guest at G-Fest XII in 2005. He was an executive producer on Legendary Pictures' Godzilla (2014), and has received posthumous executive producer credit for subsequent projects in the MonsterVerse. He died of a subarachnoid hemorrhage on May 7, 2017, at his home in Kawasaki at the age of 86. Godzilla: King of the Monsters (2019) was dedicated to his memory along with Haruo Nakajima's.

== Filmography ==
=== Director ===
- Birth of the Japanese Islands (1970)
- Godzilla vs. Hedorah (1971)
- Prophecies of Nostradamus (1974) (associate director)
- Ninja, the Wonder Boy (1985) (TV Series)

=== Assistant director ===
- Throne of Blood (1957)
- The Lower Depths (1957)
- The Hidden Fortress (1958)
- The Bad Sleep Well (1960)
- Nippon musekinin jidai (The Irresponsible Age of Japan) (1962)
- Nippon musekinin yaro (The Irresponsible Guys of Japan) (1962)
- Kyomo ware ozorami ari (1964)
- Nippon ichi no horafuki otoko (Japan's Number One Braggart Man) (1964)
- Hyappatsu hyakuchu (1965)
- Taiheiyo kiseki no sakusen: Kisuka (A Miraculous Military Operation in the Pacific Ocean: Kiska) (1965)
- Nikutai no gakko (School of the Flesh) (1965)
- Doto ichiman kairi (The Mad Atlantic) (1966)
- Kureji no musekinin Shimizu Minato (The Boss of Pickpocket Bay) (1966)
- Prophecies of Nostradamus (1974)

=== Writer ===
- Techno Police 21c (1982)
- The Wizard of Oz (1982)
- Prophecies of Nostradamus (Nosutoradamusu no daiyogen) (1974)
- Godzilla vs. Hedorah (1971)

=== Executive producer ===
- Godzilla (2014)
- Godzilla: King of the Monsters (2019) (posthumous)
- Godzilla vs. Kong (2021) (posthumous)
- Monarch: Legacy of Monsters (2023) (producer; posthumous)
- Godzilla x Kong: The New Empire (2024) (posthumous)
