= Kaoru Yumi =

Japanese actress (born 1950)

Kaoru Yumi (由美 かおる)
- Born: November 12, 1950 (age 75); Kyoto, Japan

Kaoru Yumi (由美 かおる, Yumi Kaoru; born November 12, 1950) is a Japanese actress.

== Filmography ==
=== Movies ===
- Yoru no bara wo kese (夜のバラを消せ) (1966)
- Dōsei Jidai ~Kyōko to Jirō~ (同棲時代 －今日子と次郎－) (1973)
- Shinanogawa (しなの川) (1973)
- ESPY (エスパイ) (1974)
- Prophecies of Nostradamus (ノストラダムスの大予言) (1974)
- Chō kōsō hoteru satsujin jiken (超高層ホテル殺人事件) (1976)
- Torakku yarō tenka gomen (トラック野郎天下御免) (1976)
- Hi no tori (火の鳥) (1978)

=== TV Dramas ===
- Tokyo no Sanzoku (東京の山賊) (1970), Yaku Hiroko
- Miracle Girl (????)
- Japan Sinks (1973)
- Edo o kiru (????)
- Mito Kōmon (1986)
- Mito Kōmon ~Silver Shimmer~ (水戸黄門外伝 かげろう忍法帖 かげろうお銀役) (????)
- Minami machibugyō jiken jō okore! Motome ba (南町奉行事件帖 怒れ!求馬) (1997)
- Yuu hi ga oka no sōri daijin (ゆうひが丘の総理大臣) (????)
- Did Someone Happen to Mention Me? (2026)
