= Godzilla (2014 film) =

Film by Gareth Edwards

- Theatrical release poster
- Directed by: Gareth Edwards
- Screenplay by: Max Borenstein
- Story by: David Callaham
- Based on: Godzilla by Toho Co., Ltd
- Produced by: Thomas Tull; Jon Jashni; Mary Parent; Brian Rogers
- Starring: Aaron Taylor-Johnson; Ken Watanabe; Elizabeth Olsen; Juliette Binoche; Sally Hawkins; David Strathairn; Bryan Cranston
- Cinematography: Seamus McGarvey
- Edited by: Bob Ducsay
- Music by: Alexandre Desplat
- Production company: Legendary Pictures
- Distributed by: Warner Bros. Pictures (Worldwide); Toho Co., Ltd. (Japan)
- Release dates: May 8, 2014 (Dolby Theatre); May 16, 2014 (United States)
- Running time: 123 minutes
- Countries: United States; Japan
- Languages: English; Japanese
- Budget: $160 million
- Box office: $529.1 million

Godzilla is a 2014 monster film directed by Gareth Edwards. Produced by Legendary Pictures and distributed by Warner Bros. Pictures, it is a reboot of Toho's Godzilla franchise and its 30th film, and serves as the first entry in Legendary's Monsterverse franchise. (Note: It is the second Godzilla film to be completely produced by an American studio, after the 1998 film of the same name produced by TriStar Pictures. The American releases of Godzilla (Godzilla, King of the Monsters!), King Kong vs. Godzilla, and The Return of Godzilla (Godzilla 1985) featured additional footage produced by independent American studios. The footage featured Western actors and merged it with the original Japanese footage in order to appeal to American audiences. Invasion of Astro-Monster was the first Godzilla film to be co-produced between a Japanese studio (Toho) and an American studio (UPA).) The film stars Aaron Taylor-Johnson, Ken Watanabe, Elizabeth Olsen, Juliette Binoche, Sally Hawkins, David Strathairn, and Bryan Cranston. In the film, an American soldier attempts to return to his family while caught in the crossfire of an ancient rivalry between Godzilla and two parasitic monsters known as MUTOs.

An early iteration of the project began in 2004 under executive producer Yoshimitsu Banno as a short IMAX 3D film, but was transferred to Legendary in 2009 to be redeveloped as a full-length feature. The film was announced in March 2010 and Edwards was announced as the director in January 2011. Principal photography began in March 2013 in the United States and Canada and ended in July 2013.

Godzilla was theatrically released on May 16, 2014. The film received generally positive reviews from critics, who praised the direction, visual effects, music, cinematography, respect to the source material, and Cranston's performance, but criticized the script, characters, and Godzilla's insufficient screen time. The film was a box office success, grossing $529.1 million worldwide against a production budget of $160 million. The film's success prompted Toho to produce a reboot of their own and released Shin Godzilla in 2016; Toho has since produced several follow-ups. Likewise, Legendary proceeded with sequels of their own, culminating in a shared cinematic franchise.

A sequel, Godzilla: King of the Monsters, was released on May 31, 2019.

== Plot ==
In 1954, Godzilla, a prehistoric alpha predator, is lured to Bikini Atoll in an attempt to kill him with a nuclear weapon. In 1999, Monarch scientists Ishiro Serizawa and Vivienne Graham investigate the skeleton of a monster similar to Godzilla in a cavern unearthed by a collapsed uranium mine in the Philippines. They find two giant spores, one dormant and one hatched, along with a trail leading to the sea. In Japan, the Janjira Nuclear Power Plant experiences unusual seismic activity. Supervisor Joe Brody sends his wife Sandra to lead a team of technicians into the reactor. A tremor breaches the reactor, forcing Joe to close the reactor door before Sandra and her team can escape while the plant collapses.

In 2014, Joe and Sandra's son Ford, a U.S. Navy EOD officer, returns from a tour of duty to his wife Elle, and son Sam in San Francisco. He departs for Japan after Joe is detained for trespassing in Janjira's quarantine zone. Joe is determined to find out the cause of the meltdown and persuades Ford to accompany him to retrieve vital data from their old home. They learn that the zone is uncontaminated and retrieve the data, but are discovered and taken to a facility in the plant's ruins. The facility harbors a massive chrysalis that has been feeding off the plant's reactors for fifteen years and emitting intense electromagnetic pulses over time. A giant winged insect-like creature emerges from the chrysalis and escapes, destroying the facility. Joe is severely injured and later dies. The incident is reported publicly as an earthquake.

Serizawa and Graham join a U.S. Navy task force led by Admiral William Stenz to search for the creature, dubbed a "MUTO" (Massive Unidentified Terrestrial Organism). Serizawa and Graham reveal to Ford that a 1954 deep-sea expedition awakened Godzilla. Nuclear tests in the 1950s were attempts to kill him; when this did not work, Project Monarch was established to secretly study Godzilla and similar monsters. They explain that the MUTO caused the Janjira meltdown. Ford reveals that Joe had monitored echolocation signals indicating that the MUTO was communicating with something, presumably Godzilla.

The MUTO attacks a Russian submarine and drops it in O'ahu to eat its nuclear material. Godzilla arrives, causing a tsunami in Honolulu, and briefly engages the MUTO in battle until it flees. Serizawa deduces that Godzilla was only listening and that the MUTO was communicating with something else, prompting the military to investigate the other spore stored in the Yucca Mountain nuclear waste repository in Nevada. A second, bigger, wingless MUTO has emerged and attacks Las Vegas. The scientists deduce that the first MUTO is a male and the second is a female, their signals being a mating call.

Over the scientists' objections, Stenz approves a plan of using nuclear warheads to lure all three monsters out into the open ocean and destroy them. Returning to the U.S., Ford joins the team delivering the warheads by train, but the female MUTO intercepts them and devours most of the warheads. The remaining warhead is airlifted with Ford to San Francisco (where the monsters are converging) and activated after Godzilla appears at the Golden Gate Bridge. The male MUTO snatches the warhead and takes it to the female, who forms a nest around it in the Chinatown area.

While Godzilla and the MUTOs battle, Ford and a strike team enter the city via HALO jump to find and disarm the warhead before it detonates. Unable to access the timer, the team gets the warhead onto a boat for disposal at sea while Ford destroys the nest. Godzilla defeats the MUTOs and collapses from exhaustion. Ford gets the boat out to the open sea, is rescued before the warhead explodes, and reunites with his family at an emergency shelter the following morning. Godzilla reawakens and returns to the sea while the media dubs him the "King of the Monsters".

== Cast ==
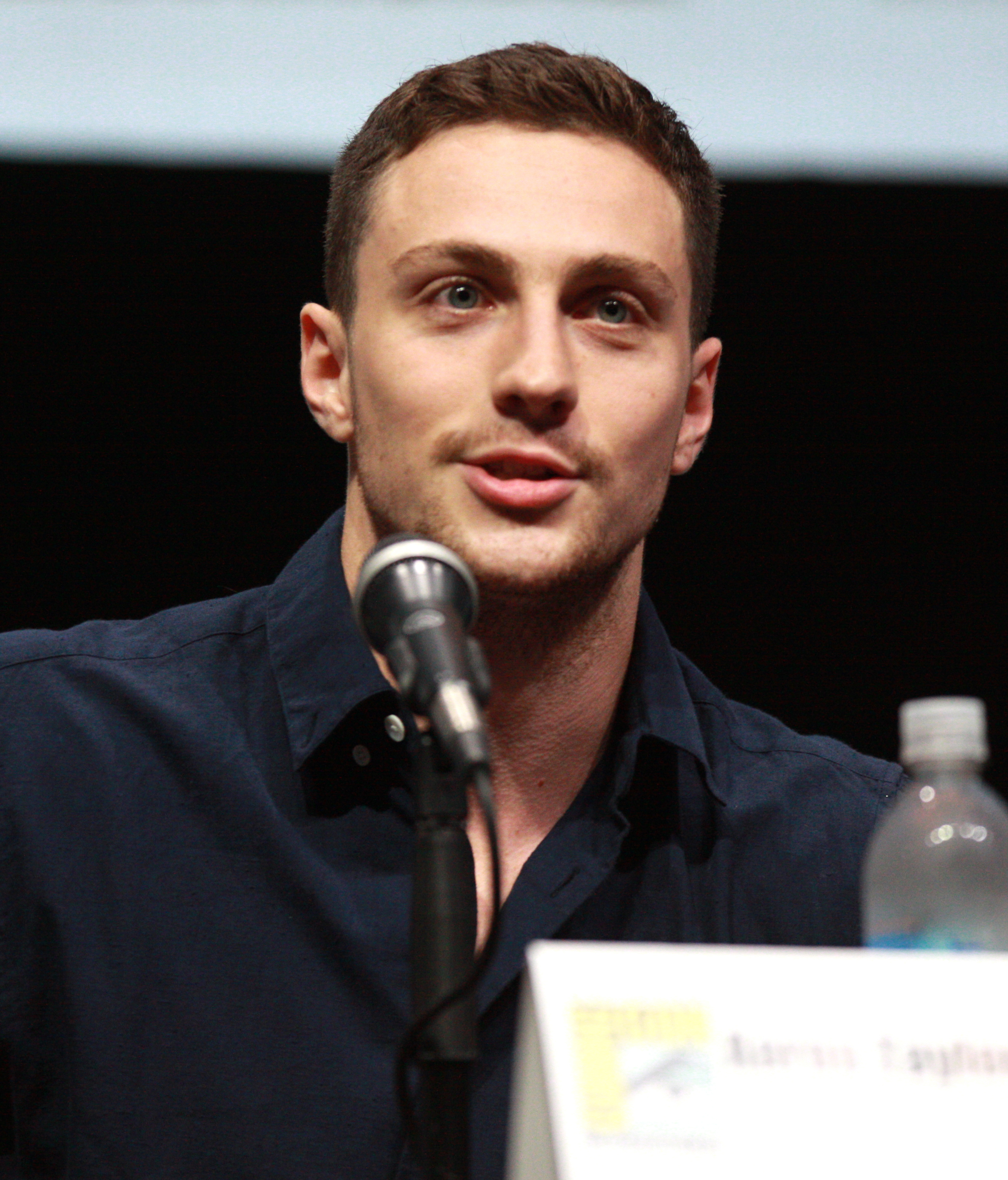
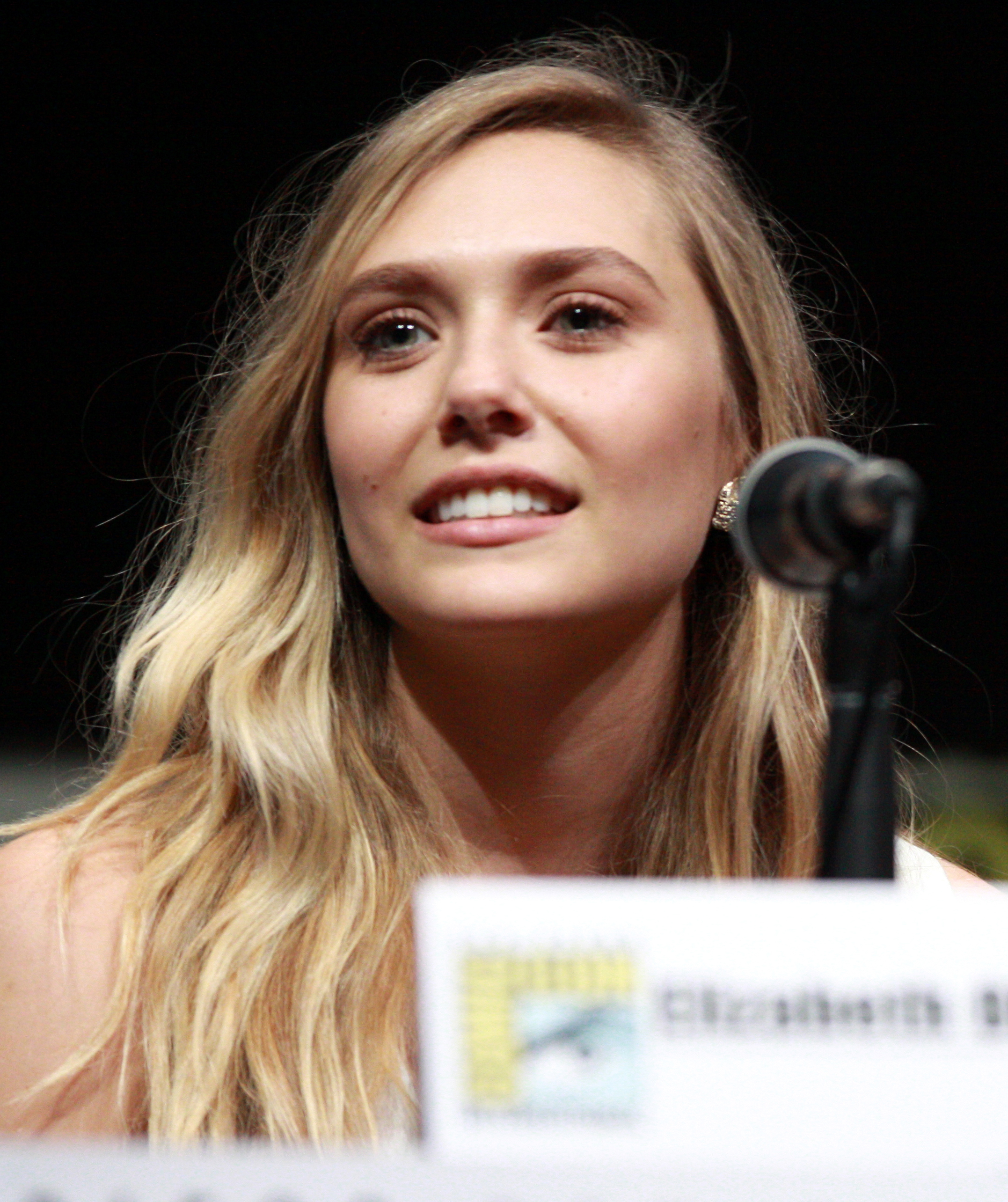
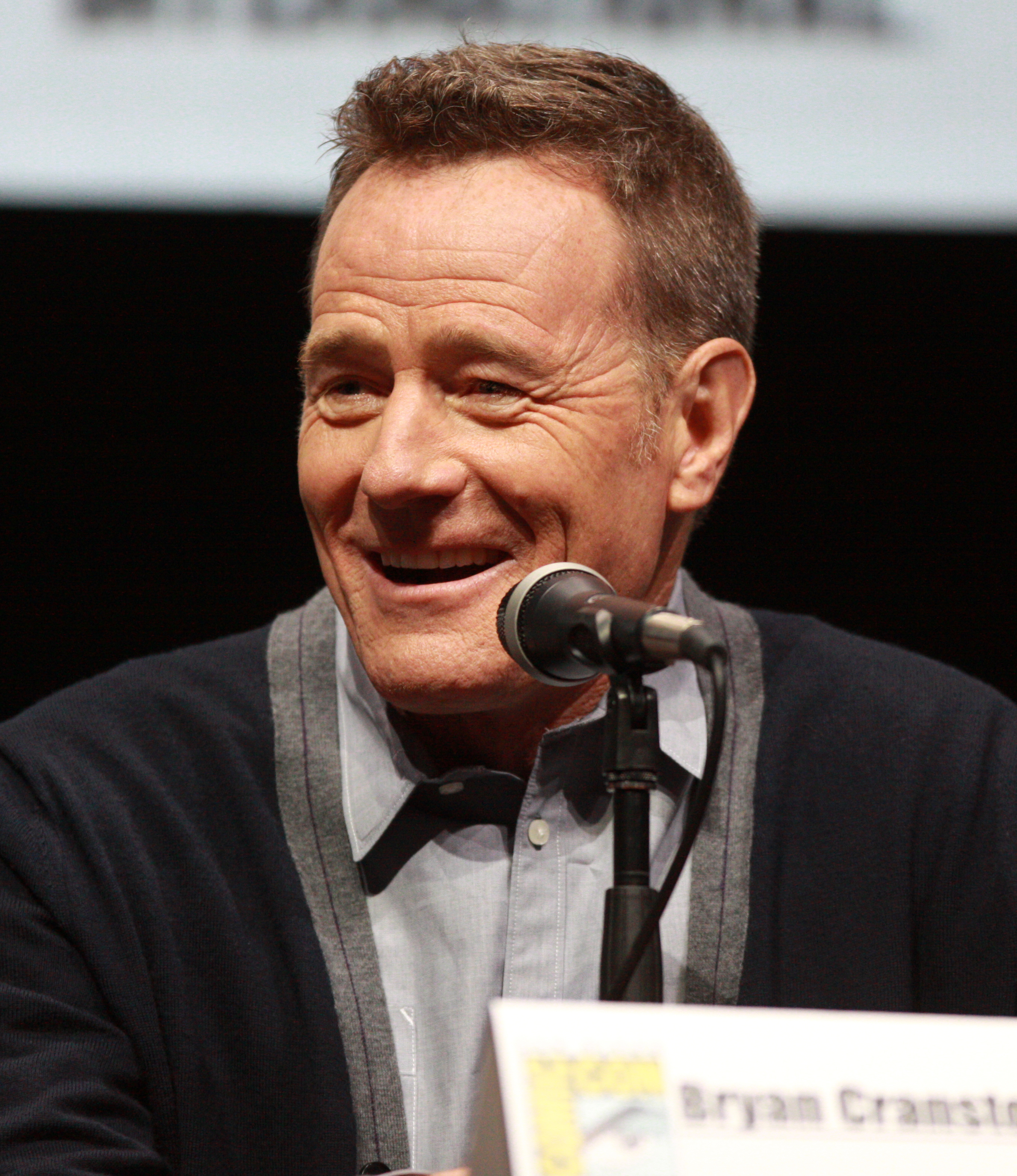
Taylor-Johnson, Olsen, and Cranston promoting the film at the 2013 San Diego Comic-Con
- Aaron Taylor-Johnson as U.S. Navy EOD LT Ford Brody:
  The son of Joe and Sandra Brody. After the nuclear plant's collapse, he grows up in the United States and becomes a lieutenant in the United States Navy as an explosive ordnance disposal officer. When Taylor-Johnson first met with Edwards, they talked for six hours about the archetype of the character. Taylor-Johnson stated that Edwards brought a level of "intimacy" to the film and praised him for treating it like a "big budget art film". He stated, "I think he went for the right balance of sensitivity and testosterone. I've probably been more emotionally challenged in this film than in any independent drama or thriller". Taylor-Johnson went through training to achieve military etiquette, and said he performed "quite a lot of the stunts". The role of Ford was reportedly offered to Joseph Gordon-Levitt in 2012, but he declined. By 2013, Henry Cavill, Scoot McNairy, and Caleb Landry Jones comprised the shortlist for the role before Legendary took interest in Taylor-Johnson. CJ Adams portrays Brody as a young boy.
- Ken Watanabe as Dr. Ishirō Serizawa:
  A scientist for Project Monarch. Watanabe was initially skeptical about a new Hollywood Godzilla film but changed his mind after a meeting with Edwards, stating, "If you are telling the Godzilla story, you cannot separate it from the nuclear element, and the first thing I asked was whether there was going to be the nuclear element, as that now, in Japan, is a really sensitive problem. I was worried about how I could use that and how I could make that okay, but Gareth understood those feelings." Watanabe's character is named after the director of various Godzilla films, Ishirō Honda, and after the scientist who killed Godzilla in the original 1954 film, Dr. Daisuke Serizawa.
- Elizabeth Olsen as Elle Brody:
  Ford's wife and a nurse at San Francisco General Hospital. Olsen agreed to join the film after being impressed with Edwards' previous film Monsters and Edwards' enthusiasm for the film and Godzilla's history. Olsen's casting was partly due to her desire to appear in a higher-profile movie after three years of appearing in low-key indie films, with her agent telling her that no one offered her a higher-profile role due to the assumption that she wasn't interested.
- Juliette Binoche as Sandra Brody:
  A nuclear regulations consultant at the Janjira nuclear plant. She is married to Joe Brody and is the mother of Ford Brody. Binoche agreed to join the film after reading a "beautiful" letter from Edwards and because she wanted to "please" her son, who is also a fan of Godzilla. Edwards has stated that her character's death scene is what convinced her (and Cranston) to join the film.
- Sally Hawkins as Dr. Vivienne Graham:
  A scientist with Project Monarch. She has been Serizawa's "right hand" for many years. Hawkins was the last actress to be cast while the film was undergoing principal photography.
- David Strathairn as Admiral William Stenz:
  An Admiral in the Seventh Fleet of the United States Navy. He is the commander of the United States Navy task force in charge of tracking down the escaped MUTO.
- Bryan Cranston as Joe Brody:
  Ford's father and former lead engineer at the Janjira nuclear plant until its destruction in 1999. Cranston has said that Edwards' approach to the film and to its characterization is what drew him to the project. He stated, "The most important thing about this version of Godzilla is the characterization. The characters in this are real, well drawn. [Edwards] takes the time to really establish who these people are, that you root for them, that you invest in these characters, and that you care for them. That's the best part of it." Cranston additionally added, "I wouldn't be here if it was just, 'Look out, this monster is crushing everything!' Instead of trying to humanize the beast what this film does - and, I think, rightfully so - is humanize the people. You root for them and sympathize with their plight". Cranston also joined the film because he has been a fan of Godzilla since childhood, stating, "Godzilla was always my favorite monster when I was young. He was unapologetic." Cranston had to wear a wig for his scenes due to finishing Breaking Bad days before filming Godzilla. Cranston was initially ready to decline the offer after being approached, assuming the film was going to be "silly"; however, director Edwards' passion for the film and his previous film Monsters impressed Cranston enough to read the script and join the film. Despite his positive opinion on the film, Cranston would later opine that killing off Joe Brody early was a "narrative mistake".
- T.J. Storm as Godzilla (motion-capture performance):
  An ancient alpha predator whose existence was kept secret by Monarch since 1954. Storm received a call from Garrett Warren, the film's action choreographer, asking for motion-capture performers who can do "beast performances". Warren instead invited Storm and two other performers to a studio, where he revealed to Storm and the others their roles for the film. Storm had to wear a suit with dots, a camera in front of his face, and a tail made out of foam. Principal photography was already completed at that point, and Storm and the other performers did not interact with director Edwards or any of the actors.
- Matt Cross and Lee Ross as The MUTOs: Ancient parasites with insect-like features.

Additional roles include: Carson Bolde as Sam Brody; Richard T. Jones as Captain Russell Hampton; Victor Rasuk as Sergeant Tre Morales; Patrick Sabongui as Master Sergeant Marcus Waltz, USAF; Jared Keeso as Jump Master; Al Sapienza as Huddleston, the head of security at the Janjira MUTO facility; Brian Markinson as Whalen, a scientist at the Janjira MUTO facility; Catherine Lough Haggquist as PO #1 Martinez; Jake Cunanan as Akio; Warren Takeuchi as Akio's father; Yuki Morita as Akio's mother; Ken Yamamura as Takashi, Joe's associate at the Janjira facility; Hiro Kanagawa as Hayato, a technician at the Janjira facility; Garry Chalk as Stan Walsh; and Christian Tessier as a technician.

Godzilla franchise actor Akira Takarada was cast as an immigration officer, but his scene was cut from the final film. Edwards stated that cutting the scene was his "biggest regret". Despite cutting the cameo, Takarada is still listed in the closing credits of the film.

== Influences ==
In March 2014, Edwards cited Godzilla (1954) as an inspiration for the film. Edwards stated, "Godzilla is a metaphor for Hiroshima in the original movie. We tried to keep that, and there are a lot of themes from the '54 movie that we've kept." Edwards decided on a restrained approach similar to when films were fueled by a "sense of anticipation" and relied on "high suspense", citing Alien, Jaws, and Close Encounters of the Third Kind as influences. On why Edwards chose a restrained direction, he stated, "I felt that in modern cinema it's so easy to just throw everything at the screen constantly." Edwards also wanted Godzilla to feel "universal" in a way that it could appeal to a general audience like Close Encounters of the Third Kind. Edwards additionally stated, "I grew up watching Spielberg movies, what they did so well — as well as having epic, fantastic spectacle — they made the characters feel real and human. We were trying to do the same thing here." Critics and journalists have also noted the film's nods to Steven Spielberg's style of filmmaking and influence from films such as Jaws, Jurassic Park, and Close Encounters of the Third Kind.

Katsuhiro Otomo's Akira had also influenced the visual design of the film, Edwards stated, "One of our designers on the film - a friend called Matt - when we were designing things, and got stuck, we'd always go, 'What would Akira do?'" For the film's cinematography, Edwards wanted "...to do this beautifully real documentary vibe, but also that classic Spielberg style". Real life events such as the 2004 Indian tsunami, Hurricane Katrina, and the Fukushima nuclear disaster served as heavy influences on the realism behind the film's destruction scenes and man vs. nature themes.

Edwards had also cited action films from the late 70's and early 80's having influenced the film as well, stating, "We tried to make a blockbuster that harks back to the pace and style of the early '80s and late '70s action movies."

== Production ==
=== Crew ===
- Gareth Edwards – director
- Patricia Whitcher – executive producer
- Alex Garcia – executive producer
- Yoshimitsu Banno – executive producer
- Kenji Okuhira – executive producer
- Owen Paterson – production designer
- Sharen Davis – costume designer
- Jim Rygiel – visual effects supervisor
- Erik Aadahl – sound designer and supervising sound editor

Personnel taken from the press release.

=== Development ===
In 1998, TriStar Pictures released their Hollywood reboot Godzilla. However, plans for a trilogy were cancelled due to the film's poor reception, and TriStar let their remake/sequel rights expire on May 20, 2003. In 2004, Toho Co., Ltd. released Godzilla: Final Wars to commemorate the franchise's 50th anniversary and to put the franchise on hiatus, due to low ticket sales and audience burnout, until demand increased for another film.

It is the second Godzilla film to be completely produced by a Hollywood studio. The American releases of Godzilla (Godzilla, King of the Monsters!), King Kong vs. Godzilla and The Return of Godzilla (Godzilla 1985) featured additional footage produced by independent Hollywood studios. The footage featured Western actors and merged it with the original Japanese footage in order to appeal to American audiences. Invasion of Astro-Monster was the first Godzilla film to be co-produced between a Japanese studio (Toho) and an American studio (UPA). The first Godzilla film to be completely produced by a Hollywood studio was the 1998 film.

==== Godzilla 3D To The Max ====
In August 2004, Yoshimitsu Banno (director of Godzilla vs. Hedorah) announced that he had secured the rights from Toho to direct an IMAX 3D short film from his Advanced Audiovisual Productions (AAP) production company. The film was tentatively titled Godzilla 3D to the Max, and was to be a remake of the Godzilla vs. Hedorah story. In 2005, American Peter Anderson was added to the project as the cinematographer, visual effects supervisor, and co-producer by an independent producer Kenji Okuhira who represented Banno. In the same year, American producer Brian Rogers signed on to the project after the meeting with Banno arranged by Okuhira and Anderson.

In 2007, also through Anderson, Kerner Optical then came on board to develop the technology and to produce the 3D film and with Kerner's backing, in the fall of 2007, the team met with Toho in Tokyo where they re-negotiated their license to allow the release of a feature-length 3D theatrical production. In 2008, Kerner was facing financial troubles that threatened to cancel the production. In 2009, Rogers, Anderson, and the then-proposed director Keith Melton met with Legendary Pictures to get their backing on a 3D theatrical film. In 2010, it was green-lit by Legendary to go to production. From the Godzilla 3D production team, Banno and Okuhira would remain on the project as executive producers and Rogers as a producer. In November 2013, Banno stated that he still planned to produce a sequel to Godzilla vs. Hedorah. However, Banno died on May 7, 2017.

==== Legendary production ====
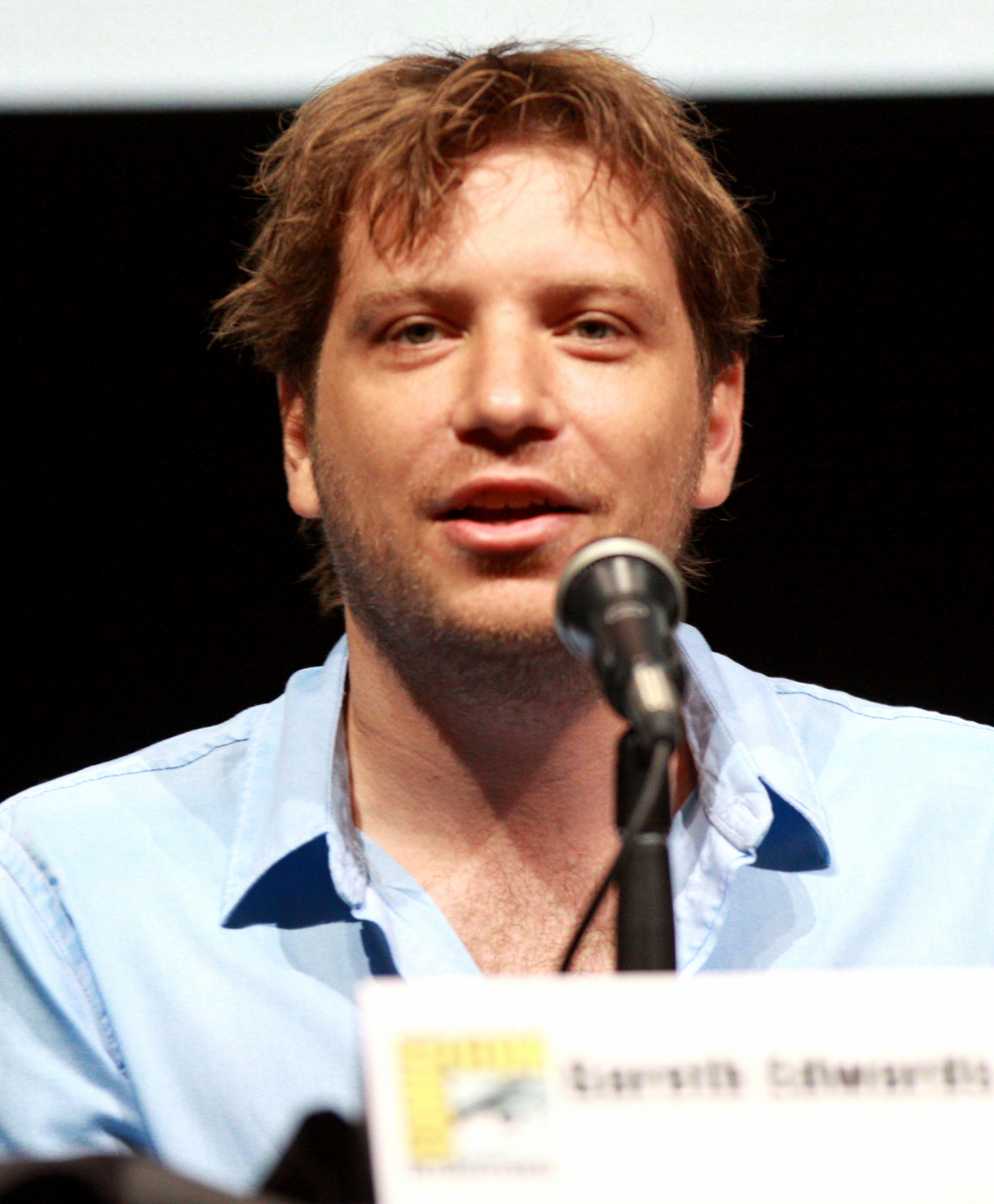
Director Gareth Edwards promoting the film at the 2013 San Diego Comic-Con

In August 2009, rumors surfaced that Legendary was in talks with Toho to produce a new American Godzilla film to be released in 2012. On March 29, 2010, Legendary officially announced its acquisition of the Godzilla license and plans to produce a new film with Warner Bros. co-producing and co-financing. Legendary's Godzilla would be closer to the Toho version and avoid connections with the 1998 film. Producer and then-CEO of Legendary Thomas Tull elaborated on Legendary's plans: "Our plans are to produce the Godzilla that we, as fans, would want to see. We intend to do justice to those essential elements that have allowed this character to remain as pop culturally relevant for as long as it has." Film producers Dan Lin, Roy Lee, Doug Davison and Legendary's Thomas Tull and Jon Jashni were added to the project as producers to work with Rogers, Banno and Okuhira. Legendary financed 75% of the film's budget while Warner Bros. financed 25%. As a slate finance partner of Warner Bros., RatPac-Dune Entertainment had a minority stake ownership over the film, as well as other Warner Bros. titles.

At the 3D Summit conference held in September 2010 at Universal Studios, producer Brian Rogers confirmed a targeted release date for 2012, and that the reboot would be a live-action project featuring a fully CGI Godzilla battling two other monsters rather than simply the military as seen in Emmerich's 1998 film. Rogers also confirmed that the two Godzilla head designs online rumored to have been designed by Legendary and sent to Toho for approval were fake. Rogers also stressed his and Legendary's wish to revive Godzilla in the same fashion Legendary had revived Batman with Batman Begins (2005).

In October 2010, Latino Review reported that Legendary had merged the spec script for Pacific Rim with their Godzilla reboot and offered Guillermo del Toro to direct it. However, Del Toro clarified to Hitfix that the report was false, stating, "I am not involved in 'Godzilla' at all. I haven't read it or plan to read it. Nor have I been approached to direct it." Legendary would go on to produce Pacific Rim as its own film, with Del Toro directing, co-writing, and co-producing, and theatrically released it on July 12, 2013. In January 2011, Gareth Edwards was announced as the director for the film. In an interview publicizing the DVD release of Monsters, Edwards discussed the new film: "this will definitely have a very different feel than the 1998 film and our biggest concern is making sure we get it right for the fans because we know their concerns. It must be brilliant in every category because I'm a fan as well." Edwards further stated, "Without addressing anything specific, everyone knows how important it is to get it right."

The film remained in development into 2012, missing the planned release date. Edwards worked on his vision for the film at a stage at the Warner Bros. lot. The production team developed Godzilla models, artwork, and pre-visualizations of the action scenes of the movie. From the lot, Edward directed a short teaser video, shown to Legendary executives and later shown at San Diego Comic-Con in July 2012.

=== Writing ===
In 2010, David Callaham pitched his take on Godzilla to Legendary and Warner Bros. and was hired to write the first draft. Speaking of his draft, Callaham stated, "Godzilla is a pretty cut and dry [sic], giant monster that smashes stuff. But the reason I got excited about it is because I saw themes and relationships to the modern world that I could tell in this story that was important." Callaham did research on Godzilla's history, animal documentaries, as well as natural disasters, and local government disaster plannings in order to depict the events as close as possible to real-life disasters.

When Edwards' signing was announced, it was also announced that Callaham's first draft would be rewritten by another writer. In July 2011, David S. Goyer was attached to rewrite the script. Goyer only worked a few weeks on the script and did not get any credit, stating, "[I was involved with Godzilla] a little bit. I mean I did three or four weeks of work on Godzilla, it wasn't a page-one rewrite or anything like that. The term is ‘script doctoring,' is what I did on it." In November 2011, Max Borenstein was hired to continue work on the script. In October 2012, Legendary announced that writer Drew Pearce would polish the script, making the principal characters older to suit the actors that Legendary had intended to cast.

In January 2013, Frank Darabont was hired for a final rewrite. In interviews, Darabont described his plans for Godzilla as returning it to a "terrifying force of nature". The film would add a "very compelling human drama" and Godzilla would be tied to a "different contemporary issue" rather than the original atomic bomb testing. In addition to contributing to the script, Darabont mainly focused on the emotional aspect and further development of the characters. Commenting on Darabont's work, Edwards stated, "We blocked out the whole story, and Frank did a pass at helping the characters and emotions. He delivered on that. Frank brought a lot of heart to it and soul." Edwards additionally confirmed that one particular scene from Darabont's rewrite convinced Bryan Cranston and Juliette Binoche to join the film. Edwards felt it was not believable that a creature as giant as Godzilla could go undetected by humanity, so the writers conceived of the idea that the monster's existence had been covered up by the United States government, and as such their nuclear tests in the Pacific during the 1950s were actually an attempt to kill the creature.

In July 2013, Edwards confirmed an origin story for the film. He also confirmed that Godzilla would be an antihero rather than a villain or a hero. He also discussed the themes incorporated into the film, stating "Godzilla is definitely a representation of the wrath of nature. We've taken it very seriously and the theme is man versus nature and Godzilla is certainly the nature side of it. You can't win that fight. Nature's always going to win and that's what the subtext of our movie is about. He's the punishment we deserve". Actress Elizabeth Olsen discussed how the film returns to the roots of the original Godzilla film and its themes as well, stating, "There's a strong theme about the importance of family in it as well as the theme of trying to control nature and how that backfires in the end."

Actor Bryan Cranston praised Edwards' vision, tone, and pitch for the film and titular character. In an interview with Canada's Entertainment Tonight, he compared Edwards' approach similar to Steven Spielberg's style in Jaws where the film does not immediately show the beast but rather build up to its appearance while still delivering an eerie and terrifying off-screen presence.

In licensing Godzilla to Legendary, Toho set down some specific conditions: that Godzilla is born of a nuclear incident and that it is set in Japan. The film has a title montage set in 1954, and then moves forward to 1999 and deals with a mysterious disaster at a fictional Japanese nuclear power plant named Janjira. Legendary rejected an origin story where a Godzilla carcass would be found entombed in Siberia. The idea was rejected after the production learned that Man of Steel had a potentially similar scene. The US Army reviewed the script, suggesting corrections for accuracy. In return for production assistance, it required deleting a reference to the atomic bombings of Hiroshima and Nagasaki. Tony Gilroy contributed some additional uncredited rewrites to the script.

=== Creature design ===
Legendary formally revealed Godzilla's final design for the cover of Empire

Producer Thomas Tull was adamant about keeping Godzilla's design consistent with the Toho version, stating, "We had to make triply sure we got it right. Godzilla had to look like Godzilla. Period." Tull was also puzzled at the design direction of Emmerich's Godzilla, stating, "I'm always puzzled as a fan when you take things so far it's unrecognizable."

Edwards and the design group reviewed all previous incarnations of Godzilla's design for inspiration. Edwards stated, "The way I tried to view it was to imagine Godzilla was a real creature and someone from Toho saw him in the 1950s and ran back to the studio to make a movie about the creature and was trying their best to remember it and draw it. And in our film you get to see him for real." He went on to say that his Godzilla remains true to the original in all aspects. Edwards also stressed that, "It was important to me that this felt like a Toho Godzilla" and concluded by wishing, "I'd love ours (Godzilla) to be considered as part of the Toho group."

In October 2013, toy and collectible websites offering pre-orders of merchandise revealed the film's additional monsters. The other creatures are, as a group, known as "MUTOs", with some having the ability to fly and being multi-limbed. The filmmakers specified that Godzilla would be 350 feet (106.7 meters) tall, the tallest incarnation of Godzilla to date at the time. According to special effect chief Jim Rygiel, the mechanics of Godzilla's fighting style is based on the study of animals, primarily bears and Komodo dragons. The height of the creature finally turned out to be 355 feet (108.2 meters).

For Empire magazine's April 2014 issue, the magazine cover featured a picture of Godzilla, revealing the monster's design. According to Edwards, elements of the faces of bears, dogs, and eagles were incorporated into the design of Godzilla's face. Motion capture by the visual effects firm The Imaginarium was also utilized in the movement of the movie's monsters in film sequences. Andy Serkis provided consultation on the film's motion capture sequences in order to "control the souls" of the creatures. Serkis stated that the film's motion capture had already been filmed before he was approached.

The Godzilla roar was revamped for the movie. According to Edwards, sound designer and supervising sound editor Erik Aadahl improved on the original sound effect provided by Toho. Aadahl and co-sound designer Ethan Van der Ryn spent six months over the three-year production getting the roar right. Using microphones that could record sound inaudible to humans, the team found sounds to match the initial shriek and the finishing bellow. The new roar retains the musical key and cadence of the roar, going from a C to a D. The final version was the 50th the team produced. The pair tested the roar on a back lot at Warner Bros., using a tour speaker array for The Rolling Stones, and estimated that it could be heard 3 miles (4.83 km) away. In IMAX theaters, the roar was integrated into the sound of the "Welcome to IMAX" sequence shown before Godzilla showings.

Upon acquiring the license for Godzilla, Legendary Pictures had planned to feature two new monsters in addition. David Callaham's first draft featured early versions of the MUTOs where they were established as ancient enemies of Godzilla but never established as to why. When Gareth Edwards came aboard the project, he created a back story to bridge the gap between Godzilla's connection with the MUTOs. Edwards brainstormed the idea that, "When these Godzillas were on Earth, there was another creature that would kill them and lay its eggs inside their dead bodies. Therefore, if these creatures ever came back, part of their life cycle would be the ability to attract Godzillas to the surface to kill them for reproduction." In an interview with The Verge, Edwards commented that it took over a year to design the MUTO creatures because the crew wanted to create something new and different for contemporary audiences. Edwards and the design team looked at creatures from such films as Jurassic Park, Alien, Starship Troopers and King Kong for inspiration, reflecting on what made their designs so iconic. From this, the design for the MUTOs kept evolving and "mutating", according to Edwards, into a cohesive design. Edwards has credited artist Matt Allsopp for creating the majority of the MUTOs designs, stating, "The DNA of the MUTO is 80 to 90 percent from Matt, he was the main guy". Others contributed to the design of the MUTOs as well such as Weta, Rob Bliss, Steambot, and Legacy, who provided a 3-D model of the MUTOs. The film depicts the MUTOs as a sexually dimorphic species. The female is much larger and walks on eight limbs—the male is much smaller, with one pair of his eight limbs modified into wings for powered flight. Though the MUTOs have an arthropod-like appearance, filmmaker Guillaume Rocheron likened them more to vertebrates. The angularity of the male MUTOs wing design was inspired by stealth aircraft. As a side-effect of the radiation they absorb as food, the MUTOs are capable of causing electromagnetic interference, the male emitting EMP shockwaves from his claws and the female having an EMP field "Sphere of Influence" surrounding her instead.

T. J. Storm provided the motion capture for Godzilla while Matt Cross and Lee Ross provided additional motion capture performances.

=== Pre-production ===
In September 2012, Legendary announced a theatrical release date of May 16, 2014, in 3D. IMAX announced that the film would also be released in IMAX 3D on May 16, 2014. Warner Brothers distributed the film worldwide, except in Japan, where it was distributed by Toho. At that time, Legendary Pictures added Alex Garcia and Patricia Whitcher as executive producers. In December, Dan Lin revealed that the film would likely start filming in Vancouver in March 2013.

Legendary turned its attention to casting parts for the movie. On January 7, 2013, it was reported that Joseph Gordon-Levitt had turned down being cast in the film in the fall of 2012. It was reported that Henry Cavill, Scoot McNairy, and Caleb Landry Jones comprised the shortlist for lead of the film. On January 10, it was first reported that Legendary Pictures was interested in Aaron Taylor-Johnson for the lead role. It was reported that Bryan Cranston and Elizabeth Olsen were also in talks to co-star. Olsen confirmed her involvement at the 2013 BAFTA awards. Juliette Binoche and David Strathairn were then signed on to join Taylor-Johnson, Cranston and Olsen in the film.

In January 2013, Mary Parent joined the project as a producer for Disruption Entertainment. and producers Dan Lin, Roy Lee and Doug Davison were dismissed from the project. According to The Hollywood Reporter, the producers left over creative and financial differences with Legendary Pictures, and Legendary was buying out their producer contracts, a move which led to court. On January 9, Legendary Pictures filed a 'Complaint for Declaratory Relief' lawsuit against Lin, Lee, and Davison in California State Court to spell out any fees owed to the individuals, who had signed an agreement with Legendary and were working with Legendary on the film's development. According to the complaint, Legendary had decided in the fall of 2012 to not employ the three as producers on the film and the three were not eligible for any producer fees. The three filed a counter-claim, that the agreement cited by Legendary was not in force and that the original working agreement was breached by Legendary. The three argued that the suit should be decided in open court, not in arbitration and that Legendary should be responsible for damages for breach of contract. At court, the judge dismissed the arbitration and ordered mediation followed by jury trial if necessary. Legendary appealed the decision and lost the appeal in March 2014, leaving the case in California Superior Court for trial. In June 2015, on the eve of the trial, the parties came to a settlement, terms of which were not disclosed.

At the start of principal photography in March 2013, Legendary formally announced the cast and producers. Yoshimitsu Banno, Alex Garcia, Kenji Okuhira, and Patricia Whitcher were formally named as executive producers and Legendary announced the addition of Ken Watanabe to the cast. After filming started, Richard T. Jones and Sally Hawkins were added. From the film set, a photograph of actor Akira Takarada (star of the original Godzilla, including five sequels) with Edwards was released. Takarada had publicly appealed to be part of the production, and the photo indicates some sort of role for the Japanese actor in the reboot. In April 2014, Takarada said in an interview that his role was cut from the final version of the film. He had the role of an immigration officer. Edwards later admitted regretting cutting out Takarada's cameo.

=== Filming ===
Principal photography began on March 18, 2013, in Vancouver, under the working title of "Nautilus", with scenes shot at the Vancouver Convention Centre, inside BC Place, and at Hi-View Lookout in Cypress Provincial Park, West Vancouver (as San Francisco's Bay Area Park). This was followed by filming in the Richmond neighborhood of Steveston. A large battle scene was shot on Moncton St, involving approximately 200 soldiers and many military vehicles. Another scene was filmed at the fisherman's wharf along Finn Slough. Additional shooting took place on Vancouver Island, around Nanaimo and Victoria in British Columbia. Additional filming involving extras took place around industrial areas of Coquitlam, British Columbia.

The scenes at the Convention Centre stood in for the Honolulu and Tokyo airports, while other locations in Vancouver were used to simulate scenes in San Francisco, Tokyo and the Philippines. Filming also used the stages of Burnaby's Canadian Motion Picture Park (CMPP), where crews built a San Francisco Chinatown street, a giant sinkhole set used for the Philippine mine, and the MUTO nest and a 400-foot (120 m) section of the Golden Gate Bridge. The Chinatown street was built on the site of the New York City set built for the Watchmen film.

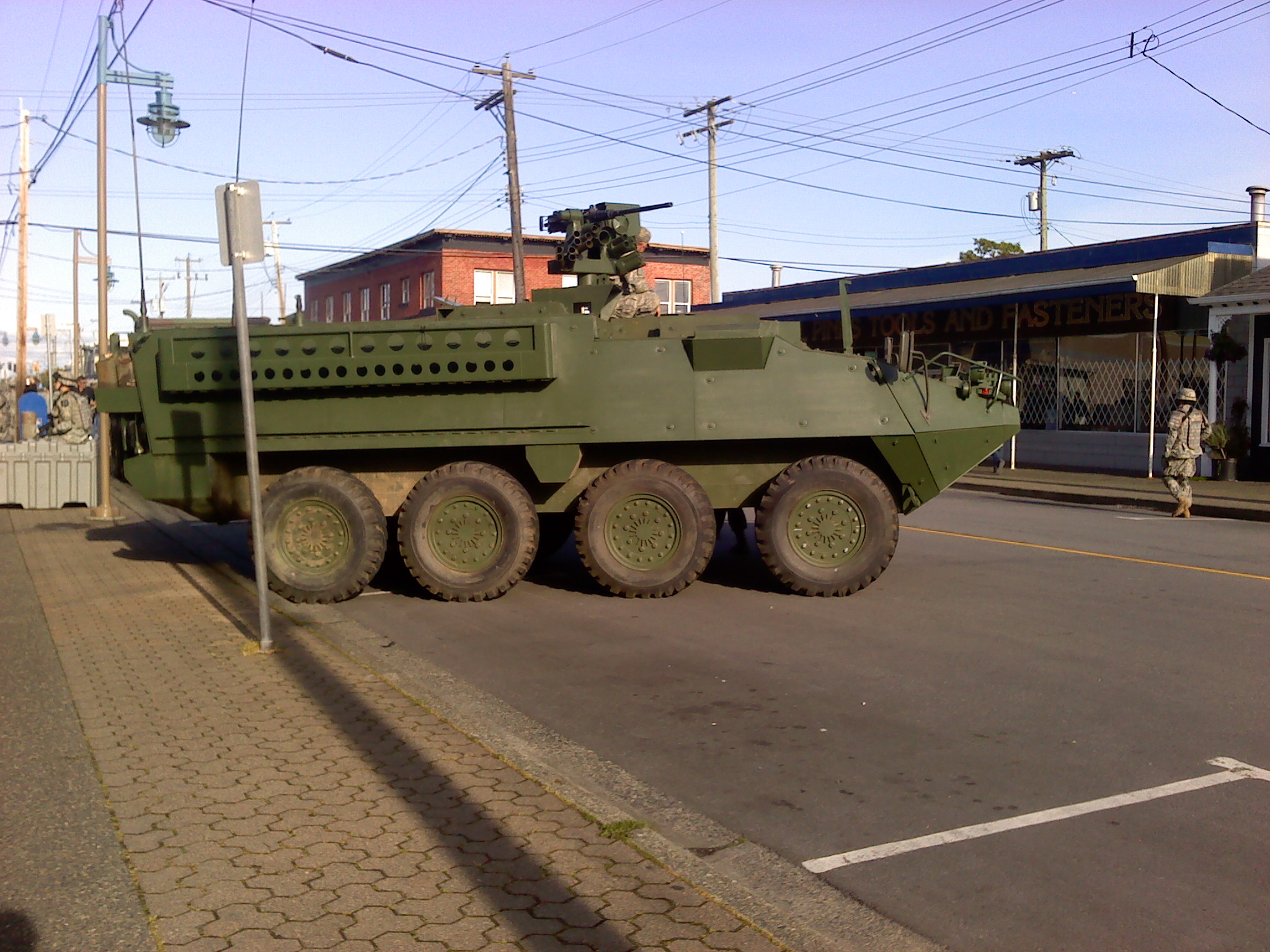
A wooden mock-up of a U.S. Army Stryker armoured fighting vehicle parked on Moncton St. in Richmond, BC during the shooting of Godzilla

Further on-location filming was done in June and July 2013 in Honolulu, Hawaii. On June 2, 2013, over 2,000 people applied at an open casting call in Hawaii to be cast as extras. Over 200 extras were hired for the expected three weeks of shooting in Hawaii, which included dressing up Waikiki Beach as the site of disaster. Eastern Oahu was used as a double for the Marshall Islands. According to The Hollywood Reporter, principal photography on Godzilla wrapped on the weekend of July 13–14.

In an interview, Aaron Taylor-Johnson described the filming as mostly on-location, with very little use of green screens. He described the film crew as fairly small compared to other films he has worked on, "almost an independent production." CGI was used to add elements later.

Seamus McGarvey served as the film's cinematographer, shooting the film digitally using Arri Alexa cameras with Panavision C-Series anamorphic lenses. Sequences of the film set in the year 1954 were shot using vintage lenses from the early 1960s in order to give the film a "distant period feel". This effect was enhanced though the digital intermediate's colour grading, as McGarvey noted that the "look I wanted was a peeled look with muted colors and diffusion on the highlights, a sense of period distance. I found a lot of photographs and magazines, and I knew that I wanted the blacks to be imbued with a tint of magenta." Though the film was made to be released in 3D, it received a predominantly 2D release. McGarvey himself decided to shoot the film as if it were only 2D, because he dislikes working with 3D filming equipment and the experience of watching 3D films in theaters.

The U.S. Navy cooperated in the making of the movie and filming took place on three U.S. Navy aircraft carriers: the USS Carl Vinson, the USS Nimitz and the USS Ronald Reagan. Part of the opening sequence was filmed on the USS Missouri at Pearl Harbor. The U.S. Army also participated in the movie with the support of three technical advisors. The U.S. Marine Corps, which had participated in the 1998 film, declined to participate after reviewing the script, which featured Navy personnel. Taylor-Johnson was put through a "mini-bootcamp" by retired Marine Sgt. Maj. James D. Dever, one of the film's military technical advisers, to "ensure he had good military bearing". Dever also helped stuntmen train for high-altitude, low-opening jumps.

Director Gareth Edwards has said that he "intentionally placed humans in shots to give the scene a sense of scale, as everyone knows the size of a human, so we know the size of a creature or a building." He has also asserted that "we wouldn't place a camera anywhere it would be impossible to get one. We would say 'Imagine it was a news story, or a sports event, cameramen would put cameras where they could in a hurry, and get any shot they could.' This is what we wanted [Godzilla] to feel like, as if people were filming glimpses at any chance they could." He also found himself "Doing things [I] think are cliche; panning up just as a roar happens, or getting the perfect shot, things I shake my head at when watching other people's films. Especially when [Godzilla] is first seen, we wanted a build up, and then pan up, we see him, and then we don't see him. I love that."

=== Visual effects and post-production ===
Visual effects on the film were supervised by visual effects supervisor Jim Rygiel, best known for his work on The Lord of the Rings movie trilogy. Rygiel has stated that the effects are in the spirit of the original series, with the blessing of Toho, although the monster would be "more dynamic than a guy in a big rubber suit." Visual effects companies working on the picture include Moving Picture Company (MPC), Double Negative, Weta Digital, Amalgamated Dynamics (ADI), ComputerCafe/CafeFX, Lidar VFX, Scanline VFX, Stereo D and The Third Floor. Production of the movie was completed in the last week of March 2014.

To create a CGI version of Godzilla, MPC studied various animals such as bears, Komodo dragons, lizards, lions and wolves which helped the visual effects artists visualize Godzilla's body structure like that of its underlying bone, fat and muscle structure as well as the thickness and texture of its scale.

The production used high-quality panorama photos of the San Francisco skyline and built a three-dimensional map of the city. The map was used in the background of sequences shot on the bridge set in Vancouver. According to Jim Rygiel, "this technique gives you a real city that is accurate down to every piece of mortar in a brick building, so, using that, we were able to composite the live action shots with the key frame-animated monsters destroying digital buildings into a seamless whole." Army vehicles, including tanks were provided by CGI and are not real vehicles. The studio digitized actual military equipment from the 7th Infantry Division of the Army. The film's title sequence was designed by Kyle Cooper, who had done the title sequence for Godzilla: Final Wars. The film's sound was mixed at Warner Bros.' studio in Burbank, California. The tracks were mixed by Gregg Landaker in the Dolby Atmos surround-sound format for exhibition in theaters with Atmos-equipped sound systems.

== Music ==
French composer Alexandre Desplat was hired to compose an original soundtrack for Godzilla. Desplat had not composed previously for a monster film, having worked on movies such as The King's Speech, The Curious Case of Benjamin Button, and the final two Harry Potter films. Desplat accepted the contract after being impressed with Edwards' film Monsters. Desplat describes the soundtrack for Godzilla as "non-stop fortissimo, with lots of brass, Japanese drums, and electric violin." The score is also conducted by Desplat. The film score was released by WaterTower Music on May 13, 2014.

The film features György Ligeti's Requiem (also used in 2001: A Space Odyssey), Dusty Springfield's 1969 recording of "Breakfast in Bed", and Elvis Presley's "(You're the) Devil in Disguise".

== Marketing ==
An early prototype of Legendary's Godzilla design was displayed at the Godzilla Encounter exhibit.

The film had a print and advertisement budget of $100 million. In promotion of the project, visitors to the 2010 San Diego Comic-Con received a T-shirt with an image of the new Godzilla design, an image credited to comics and manga publisher UDON Entertainment. Artist Gonzalo Ordóñez Arias worked with Legendary and Toho to create the painting. Further, visitors to the Legendary Pictures booth at the convention could view an animation of the new Godzilla breathing atomic beams superimposed over their image captured via a webcam. The augmented reality promotion was designed by Talking Dog Studios of Saskatchewan, Canada.

At a session during the July 2012 SDCC, Legendary presented both a poster for the film and a teaser trailer. The teaser trailer included a depiction of Godzilla faithful to the Toho monster, which included a roar and a "gigantic centipede-like monster". The centipede-like monster was not used in the final film. Screenwriter Max Borenstein later confirmed that the centipede monster was conceived only for the teaser and only to indicate that Godzilla would fight another creature. It was included in the teaser before Borenstein completed writing the script.

During filming in Vancouver, Legendary released several videos and still pictures of filming in Vancouver on its Facebook site. Pictures included a destroyed subway car with a green screen backdrop, soldiers inspecting a radioactive vault and wreckage on a shoreline. In July 2013, Legendary launched a "viral" website godzillaencounter.com in conjunction with the film. The company was promoting the film at the 2013 SDCC, and converted a warehouse in San Diego to the "Godzilla Encounter" exhibit in conjunction with the convention. According to USA Today, the exhibit was "part museum, part theme park" with displays to simulate an experience of a Godzilla attack. The exhibit also had artifacts from the franchise series, including the "Oxygen Destroyer" of the original film, and a Godzilla costume from Godzilla 2000. An audio sample was released on Godzillaencounter.com of an announcement suggesting Godzilla or a "gigantic atomic creature" attacking San Diego.

At a session at the 2013 Comic-Con, Legendary showed footage from the film. As reported by various media, the footage is of a large monster, reminiscent of the Cloverfield monster, attacking an airport, when Godzilla's foot appears next to the monster. Godzilla's height is revealed to be several times the size of the other monster and a battle ensues, but Godzilla's face is not revealed. Various clips of scenes with Cranston, Taylor-Johnson and Olsen were also shown.

In October 2013, the proof of concept footage shown at SDCC 2012 was leaked online and was available on several video-sharing websites for several days before Warner Bros. and Legendary managed to have it fully removed. The first official trailer was released online on December 10, 2013, and was attached to theatrical showings of The Hobbit: The Desolation of Smaug in select theaters. Within two days, the trailer surpassed nine million views on YouTube. Legendary launched a viral web site www.mutoresearch.net just prior to the trailer release, with video from the trailer and the trailer itself. Toho launched a website of its own, godzilla.jp, with a simple arcade game of Godzilla stomping on Tokyo and using his radioactive breath, as well as appearances from King Ghidorah and Mothra.

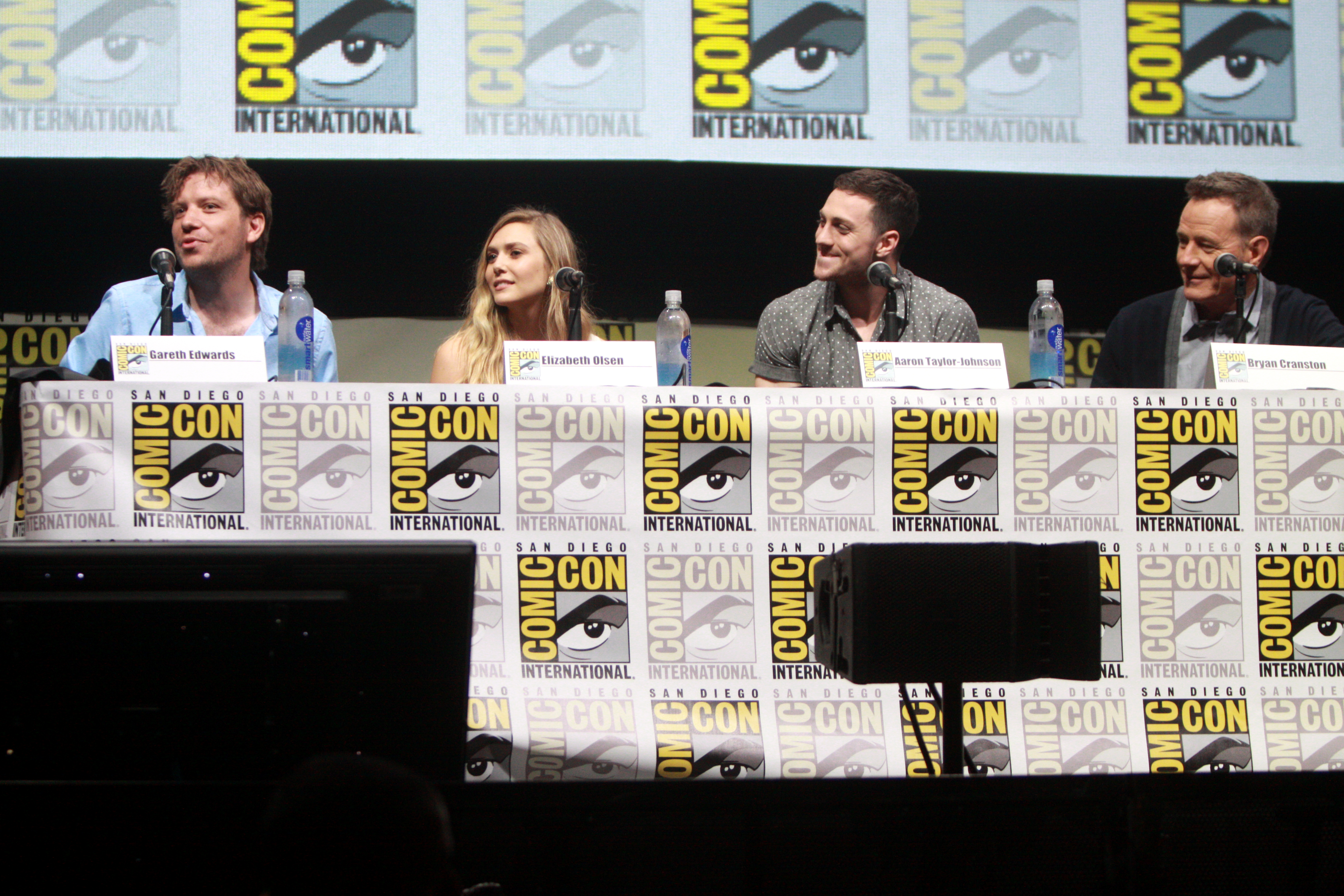
From left: Gareth Edwards, Elizabeth Olsen, Aaron Taylor-Johnson and Bryan Cranston promoting the film at the 2013 San Diego Comic-Con

The second trailer was released on February 25, 2014. It revealed more scenes of destruction by Godzilla in San Francisco and Las Vegas, brief glimpses of other creatures, and a conspiracy plot intertwined with the atomic blast tests in the Pacific Ocean in 1954. Within three days, the video had recorded 13 million views on YouTube. Several more trailers were released, with variations for North America, Japan, Asia outside Japan and internationally. Several of the marketing materials won awards: the trailer ("Ravaged/Event"), the TV spot ("Fight"), and the Godzilla poster won Golden Trailer Awards.

In cross promotion, Godzilla appeared in a light-hearted commercial for the Snickers chocolate bar, playing ping pong and water skiing. The angry Godzilla is calmed by eating a Snickers bar. Godzilla is portrayed as both human-sized and much larger. Another cross-promotion commercial was made, featuring Godzilla in a Fiat 500L car commercial. In it, Godzilla is rampaging through a city, devouring Fiat cars as he goes, with a soldier claiming that he was "craving Italian". He then approaches to devour a Fiat 500L, but because of the car's size being larger than a 500 model, Godzilla cannot swallow it. Nearly choking on it, he spits out the car as it drives away.

Legendary Pictures had set up a new Applied Analytics Group to direct its marketing efforts, and Godzilla was the first film that used analytics, similar to the use of sports analytics, to direct its marketing. According to Legendary CEO Thomas Tull, it developed a news software program named "Eddington", which, based on a massive database, was able to determine demographic trends among sub-groups of core filmgoers. It extended the standard Hollywood four-quadrant analysis of male/female and under/over 25 years of age to smaller target markets. Godzilla beat predictions of an opening-weekend gross of $60 million by over $30 million, a difference Tull attributed to Eddington. According to Tull, Legendary spent less on marketing than it had in the past.

In July 2014, Japan completed a 6.6 meters (22 ft) statue in Tokyo Midtown area in Tokyo.

=== Merchandise ===
In June 2013, Variety reported that Warner Bros. Consumer Products and Legendary Entertainment had assembled a large team of partners to make licensed merchandise to be released in conjunction with the film. Bandai America produced a line of toys, and other products were produced by NECA, Jakks Pacific, Bioworld, Trevco, Rubie's, and Sideshow Collectibles. Bandai and NECA produced toys inspired by the film; JAKKS Pacific produced large-scale figures and other toy products; Rubie's produced Godzilla costumes; and Sideshow Collectibles produced collectible statues.

A novelization, written by science-fiction writer Greg Cox, was published by Titan Books in May 2014, to coincide with the film's release. Cox has previously written novelizations for movies, including Legendary's own The Dark Knight Rises and Man of Steel. Two other books were scheduled for release including Godzilla: With Light and Sound! for children, and Godzilla: The Art of Destruction, a collection of artwork, plus interviews with the director and cast members.

Legendary announced in January 2014, along with a video message by Edwards, a tie-in graphic novel to be released on May 7, 2014, one week before the movie. Entitled Godzilla: Awakening, the novel's events take place decades before the events seen in the film. It is co-written by Greg Borenstein and the film's screenwriter Max Borenstein, with cover art by Arthur Adams and interior art by Eric Battle, Yvel Guichet, Alan Quah and Lee Loughridge. The tagline is "Delve into an incredible mystery, generations in the making. At the dawn of the atomic age, humanity awakens lifeforms beyond imagination, unleashing monumental forces of nature."

Pictures of the line of toys, including a Godzilla "Atomic Roar" model by Bandai, were leaked to the internet in March 2014. The Godzilla model has "atomic fire breath". The toys shipped in March 2014. A S.H.Monsterarts version of the 2014 Godzilla is also announced by Bandai, which is released in September 2014. A tie-in game for mobile devices was announced in March 2014. The game, titled Godzilla Smash 3, allows moves by matching three items of a similar type in a row. It is being made by Rogue Play and features puzzle-based gameplay similar to Candy Crush Saga. Above the game board, a view of Godzilla destroying various military vehicles is featured and the different attacks correspond to the combinations the player scores. The game was released in May 2014. Legendary's Godzilla was featured as a playable character in Bandai Namco's 2014 video game Godzilla as "Hollywood Godzilla".

== Release ==
=== Theatrical ===
Godzilla had its red carpet premiere at the Dolby Theatre in Hollywood on May 8, 2014. An "Aftermath Afterparty" was held after the premiere, which featured a 22-foot statue of Godzilla made out of rubble erected before the El Capitan Theatre. Godzilla received wide release worldwide in 2D, 3D, RealD 3D, IMAX 3D and 4DX on May 16, 2014. In the United States, the film was given a PG-13 rating by the Motion Picture Association of America (MPAA) for "intense sequences of destruction, mayhem and creature violence." The film was released in China on June 13 and in Japan on July 25, 2014. In April 2014, Toho had an early screening of Godzilla and gave a positive review. Edwards said, "They saw it yesterday and I got an e-mail saying they thought it was fantastic! So that was a relief." Legendary also held screenings for the military.

=== Home media ===
Toho's five-disc limited edition set

Godzilla was released on Blu-ray Disc and DVD formats on September 16, 2014, in North America. It was released for digital HD download on August 26, 2014. Target released its own exclusive edition of the Blu-ray, which includes an exclusive 30-minute featurette titled Godzilla: Rebirth of an Icon while Walmart released its own exclusive edition, which only features an alternative cover for the DVD. Producer Thomas Tull confirmed plans for an extended cut of the film to be released in the future. In the United States and Canada, the DVD earned $17.8 million and the Blu-ray earned $27.5 million, totaling $45.3 million in domestic video sales.

Toho released the film on Blu-ray and DVD formats in Japan on February 25, 2015, as well as a five-disc limited edition Blu-ray set including the 3D Blu-ray, 2D Blu-ray, DVD, a disc of bonus features (includes the North American special features, as well as additional Japan-exclusive features), a full color booklet with Japanese promotional art, and an exclusive S.H. MonsterArts figure. The film was released on 4K Blu-ray on March 23, 2021, to commemorate the release of Godzilla vs. Kong.

== Reception ==
=== Box office ===
In January 2014, John Furrier contributed to Forbes an analysis listing three forthcoming 2014 films that would flop: Godzilla, RoboCop, and Guardians of the Galaxy. He awarded Godzilla the number one slot, stating, "Hands down, Godzilla will be the biggest box office bomb of 2014. Godzilla as a character is box office poison." He cited the box office performances of past Godzilla films, as well as non-related monster films, to bolster his prediction. Legendary stated that the film would need to gross $380 million worldwide to break-even.

Godzilla grossed $9.3 million in North America at early Thursday screenings, one of the best late-night openings for a non-sequel, and $93.2 million for the entire weekend, making it the fifth highest opening weekend in 2014. Its opening weekend gross broke the records for the highest weekend debuts for a disaster film and a creature feature, surpassing The Day After Tomorrow and The Lost World: Jurassic Park simultaneously. The film also surpassed The Matrix Reloaded to achieve the highest May opening weekend for any Warner Bros. film at the time. It was estimated that approximately half of the gross was in 3D screenings. In its second weekend, which saw competition from X-Men: Days of Future Past, Godzilla had a 66% drop. At the end of its domestic run, Godzilla grossed $200.7 million in North America, the lowest total ever for a movie that opened above $90 million. Godzilla finished as the 13th highest-grossing film of 2014 in North America.

Also on May 15, Godzilla opened in every major market internationally, with the exception of China and Japan, grossing $103.4 million, giving it a worldwide opening weekend of nearly $200 million. On June 13, the film opened in China and grossed $10.9 million for the largest opening day in that country for 2014, and would open with $37 million for the weekend. The film finished with $77.6 million as the 18th highest-grossing film in that country for the year. On July 25, Godzilla finally opened in Japan, where it opened at number one and grossed $6.95 million for the weekend, the second-highest opening weekend in Japan of any foreign film in 2014. Considered a "robust debut", this helped push the film's global box office to over $500 million. It eventually finished with just shy of $30 million in Japan, making it the 12th highest-grossing film in that country for the year. Godzilla finished its theatrical global run between $324–328 million from international markets, giving it a worldwide total of $529 million and making it the 14th highest-grossing film of 2014 worldwide. Calculating in all expenses, Deadline Hollywood estimated that the film made a net profit of $92.3 million, shared between Warner Bros. and Legendary.

=== Critical response ===
Critics praised Edwards' tone and direction while others criticized the underdeveloped characters and insufficient screentime for Godzilla.

Godzilla received generally positive reviews from critics. On the review aggregator website Rotten Tomatoes, 76% of 330 critics' reviews are positive, with an average rating of 6.7/10. The website's consensus reads: "With just enough human drama to anchor the sweeping spectacle of giant monsters smashing everything in sight, Gareth Edwards' Godzilla satisfyingly restores the franchise's fire-breathing glory." Metacritic, which uses a weighted average, assigned the film a score of 62 out of 100, based on 48 critics, indicating "generally favorable" reviews. CinemaScore reported that audiences gave the film an average grade of "B+" on an A+ to F scale.

Alex Pappademas of Grantland called the film "the first truly joyous popcorn action movie of the season" and praised Edwards' directing, stating, "I admired Edwards's restraint, a quality I'm not accustomed to admiring in $160 million summer action movies." Richard Roeper stated, "Edwards and his team produce consistently stunning visuals", but admitted that he "would have liked to see more of Godzilla" but stated that the film is "leaps and bounds ahead of the 1998 bomb" and awarded the film a B+ rating. Keith Uhlich of The A.V. Club named Godzilla the second-best film of 2014. Stephanie Zacharek of the Village Voice stated "Godzilla is one of those generic, omnipresent blockbusters that's undone by the very spectacle it strives to dazzle us with: Everything is so gargantuan, so momentous, that nothing has any weight." A. O. Scott of the New York Times stated the film "is at once bloated and efficient, executed with tremendous discipline and intelligence" and found that "it surpasses Roland Emmerich's 1998 Godzilla" but felt the characterization was "thin" and the performances were "squandered" but felt that the "soul" of the film "dwells with the monsters". Tom Russo of the Boston Globe felt the film "is an uneven spectacle that can't sustain its solid first-half character moments" but did state the film "can also flash a surprising, often clever sense of legacy, and is intermittently capable of thrilling us."

Michael Phillips of the Chicago Tribune awarded the film three and a half stars, finding that the film "makes up" for the 1998 version and praised Edwards' directing and build-up, and defended Godzilla's screen-time, stating, "Is there enough Godzilla in Godzilla? Folks, there is. There is just enough." David Blaustein of ABC News Radio awarded the film three-and-a-half stars out of five, calling it "very good, but not great", criticizing the film's insufficient screen-time for Godzilla, but stated that the film's finale, "more or less, makes it all worth the wait." Matt Zoller Seitz awarded the film three and a half stars out of four and observed how "it's less interested in a giant monster's rampage than in what it might feel like to be a tiny human watching it close up, or far away, or on TV. It is not about Godzilla or the beasts he fights, it's a combination epic horror film and parable of nature in revolt, filled with odd ellipses and surprising but appropriate storytelling choices, such as an early monster duel that plays out mainly on CNN."

Japanese critics and journalists have praised the film for putting "more of an effort to honor the spirit and visual style of the Japanese series" but criticized the film for "complicating the anti-war, anti-nuclear sensibility" and "lack of nerve on the part of the filmmakers to say anything substantial about nuclear weapons or nuclear energy". However, Godzilla illustrator Yuji Kaida called the film "a real kaijū eiga (monster movie) that honored the original in that Godzilla was presented as a force beyond human understanding that maintained the Earth's natural balance".

=== Other responses ===
William Tsutsui, author of Godzilla on My Mind, felt that the film's version of Godzilla remains faithful to the Toho iterations of the 1960s and 1970s while providing a twenty-first-century twist to the character without completely anthropomorphizing him. He also juxtaposed the film's liberal depiction of affection, gluttony, and violence with the Japanese films and noted that the film loses Godzilla's Japanese identity by seemingly depicting him as a "defender of the United States". Ed Godziszewski, author of The Illustrated Encyclopedia of Godzilla and co-author of Ishiro Honda: A Life in Film, from Godzilla to Kurosawa, felt that the film did not provide much social commentary like previous Godzilla films but instead offering superficial lip service to the use of nuclear weapons; he adds that the film implies that nuclear weapons are "the answer to everything". However, Godziszewski admits to enjoying the film and praises the monster battles for being choreographed closer to the original Toho films than how Pacific Rim was choreographed.

David Kalat, author of A Critical History and Filmography of Toho's Godzilla Series, felt that Edwards figured out a successful "modern American context" unique to this version of Godzilla rather than trying to recapture the pivotal point of the 1954 film. He also praised the film's support of American troops, he juxtaposed the film's heroic depiction of the military, even when they fail, with past Godzilla films where the military fails due to stupidity. Kalat was initially skeptical of the film's grim and serious approach, feeling that monster films should embrace their lunacy, but admitted that the film proved him wrong, stating, "I was really surprised how much I liked this", but criticized the film for giving Godzilla "almost no screen-time". Steve Ryfle, author of Japan's Favorite Mon-Star and co-author of Ishiro Honda: A Life in Film, from Godzilla to Kurosawa, felt that "America is incapable of making an honest Godzilla." Ryfle criticized how the film revises history to avoid "American culpability" and its "uncomfortable facts" tied to Godzilla's origins. He accuses the film of "whitewashing" the source material to "negate the monster's politics for American consumption" and reconstructs images of real life disasters - such as Fukushima, the Indian Ocean tsunami, Katrina, 9/11 - solely for the purpose of technical prowess instead of relevant commentary. Ultimately, Ryfle concluded that "the latest Godzilla reboot is about nothing".

According to Juliette Binoche, filmmaker Quentin Tarantino admitted to her to crying while watching the film; Tarantino stated it was "the first time I've ever cried during a 3D blockbuster."

In 2023, Mutotylaspis, a paguroid hermit crab from the middle Cretaceous (Albian) deposits of Vladimir Oblast (Central Russia) was named after the MUTOs.

=== Accolades ===
Year	Award	Category	Recipient	Result	Ref.
2014	15th Golden Trailer Awards	Best Summer 2014 Blockbuster Trailer	Godzilla "Ravaged/Event"	Nominated	
2014	15th Golden Trailer Awards	Best Sound Editing	Godzilla "Ravaged/Event"	Nominated	
2014	15th Golden Trailer Awards	Best Action TV Spot	Godzilla "Fight"	Nominated	
2014	15th Golden Trailer Awards	Best Summer 2014 Blockbuster TV Spot	Godzilla "Fight"	Won	
2014	15th Golden Trailer Awards	Best International Poster	Godzilla	Won	
2014	15th Golden Trailer Awards	Best Summer 2014 Blockbuster Poster	Godzilla	Won	
2014	Golden Schmoes Awards	Most Overrated Movie of the Year	Godzilla	Nominated	
2014	Golden Schmoes Awards	Best Sci-Fi Movie of the Year	Godzilla	Nominated	
2014	Golden Schmoes Awards	Favorite Poster Movie of the Year	Godzilla	Nominated	
2014	Golden Schmoes Awards	Best Line of the Year	"Let them fight"	Nominated	
2014	Teen Choice Awards	Choice Movie: Action	Godzilla	Nominated	
2014	Teen Choice Awards	Choice Movie: Breakout Star	Elizabeth Olsen	Nominated	
2014	Teen Choice Awards	Choice Movie: Hissy Fit	For the character, "Godzilla"	Nominated	
2014	Hollywood Post Alliance	Outstanding Sound - Feature Film	Erik Aadahl, Ethan Van der Ryn, Tim LeBlanc, Gregg Landaker, Rick Kline	Nominated	
2014	World Soundtrack Academy	Film Composer of the Year	Alexandre Desplat (also for The Grand Budapest Hotel, Marius, The Monuments Men, Philomena, Venus in Fur, and Zulu)	Won	
2014	22nd Annual Japan Cool Content Contribution Award		Alex Garcia	Won	
2015
2015	Fangoria Chainsaw Awards	Best Wide-Release	Gareth Edwards	Nominated	
2015	Houston Film Critics Society	Best Poster	Godzilla	Nominated	
2015	International Film Music Critics Association	Best Original Score for a Fantasy/Science Fiction/Horror Film	Alexandre Desplat	Nominated	
2015	Japan Academy Prize	Outstanding Foreign Language Film	Godzilla	Nominated	
2015	41st Saturn Awards	Best Science Fiction Film	Godzilla	Nominated	
2015	41st Saturn Awards	Best Music	Alexandre Desplat	Nominated	
2015	36th Young Artist Awards	Best Performance in a Feature Film – Supporting Young Actor	Carson Bolde	Nominated	

== Sequels ==
In October 2015, Legendary announced plans to create a shared cinematic franchise between Godzilla and King Kong that would lead to Godzilla vs. Kong. In January 2017, Thomas Tull, founder of Legendary, resigned from the company but would remain as producer for the Godzilla–Kong series, which was revealed as the "Monsterverse".

Prior to announcing a shared cinematic series, Legendary intended to produce a Godzilla trilogy with Edwards attached to direct. In May 2016, Edwards left the sequel to work on smaller scale projects. In October 2016, Michael Dougherty and Zach Shields became attached to write the script for Godzilla: King of the Monsters and Dougherty was announced as the director in January 2017. Principal photography began in June 2017 in Atlanta, Georgia and ended in September 2017. The film was released on May 31, 2019 and was followed by Godzilla vs. Kong (2021); which generated its own sequel Godzilla x Kong: The New Empire. The next installment, Godzilla x Kong: Supernova, will release on March 26, 2027.

== Sources ==
- Cotta Vaz, Mark (2014). Godzilla: The Art of Destruction. Insight Editions. ISBN 9781608873449.
- Cox, Greg (2014). Godzilla: The Official Movie Novelization. Titan Books. ISBN 9781783290949.
- Eaton, Chris (2018). Episode 71: Storming Into Comic-Con (with TJ Storm) (Audio Podcast). PanzerCrush.
- Jolin, Dan (2014). "Now I am become death, the destroyer of worlds". Empire (April 2014): 68–77.
- Kalat, David (2010). A Critical History and Filmography of Toho's Godzilla Series (second ed.). McFarland. ISBN 9780786447497.
- Mustachio, Camille D.G.; Barr, Jason (2017). Giant Creatures in Our World: Essays on Kaiju and American Popular Culture. McFarland. ISBN 9781476668369.
- Ryfle, Steve (1998). Japan's Favorite Mon-Star: The Unauthorized Biography of the Big G. ECW Press. ISBN 1550223488.
- Solomon, Brian (2017). Godzilla FAQ: All That's Left to Know About the King of the Monsters. Applause Theatre & Cinema Books. ISBN 9781495045684.
