= ESPY (film) =

- Theatrical release poster
- Directed by: Jun Fukuda
- Screenplay by: Ei Ogawa
- Story by: Sakyo Komatsu
- Produced by: Tomoyuki Tanaka; Fumio Tanaka
- Starring: Hiroshi Fujioka; Kaoru Yumi; Masao Kusakari
- Cinematography: Shoji Ueda; Kazutami Hara
- Edited by: Michiko Ikeda
- Music by: Masaaki Hirao; Kensuke Kyo
- Production company: Toho-Eizo
- Distributed by: Toho
- Release date: 28 December 1974 (Japan)
- Running time: 94 minutes
- Country: Japan
- Language: Japanese

ESPY (Japanese: エスパイ, Hepburn: Esupai) is a 1974 Japanese film based on a story by Sakyo Komatsu. The film was directed by Jun Fukuda from a screenplay by Ei Ogawa. It stars Hiroshi Fujioka, Masao Kusakari, Kaoru Yumi, Tomisaburo Wakayama and Eiji Okada.

== Plot ==
The International Psychic Power Group is a covert organization financed by the United Nations. Made up of clairvoyant supermen under the guise of the International Pollution Research Center, they wage a private war against enemies that threaten world peace and the total annihilation of the human race. With hostility between the East and West reaching a boiling point, four Eastern European delegates are assassinated aboard the Milan-Geneva International Express on their way to the United Nations for the Mediation Committee of International Dispute. The Baltonian Prime Minister is the next to be targeted for termination. A ruthless psychic assassin named Goro hunts down the psychokinetic saviors, themselves marked for death by an anti-ESPY group led by the insidious and superhuman Ulrov, who plans to destroy mankind by initiating World War III.

== Cast ==
- Hiroshi Fujioka as Yoshio Tamura
- Kaoru Yumi as Maria Harada
- Masao Kusakari as Jiro Miki
  - Kelly Vansis as Young Miki
- Yuzo Kayama as Hojo
- Tomisaburo Wakayama as Ulrov
- Luna Takamura as Julietta
  - Julie Club as Young Julietta
- Hatsuo Yamaya as Ball
- Jimmy Shaw as Godonov
- Willie Dorsey as Abdullah
- Katsumasa Uchida as Gorou Tatsumi
- Steve Green as the Prime Minister of Baltonia
- Andrew Hughes as P.B.
- Eiji Okada as Salabad
- Gorō Mutsumi as Teraoka
- Ralph Jesser as Anti-ESPY A
- Germal Liner as Anti-ESPY B
- Franz Gruber as Anti-ESPY C
- Bart Johanson as Anti-ESPY D
- Robert Dunham as Airline captain

== Release ==
ESPY was released theatrically in Japan on 28 December 1974, where it was distributed by Toho. It was released in the United States by Toho International with English subtitles and a 94-minute running time in 1975. It was released to home video with the on-screen title E.S.P./SPY with a 1984 English-language dub for television syndication by UPA of America and with an 86-minute running time by Paramount/Gateway in 1994.
