= Ben Goto =

Japanese journalist and writer (1929–2020)

Tsutomu "Ben" Goto (五島 勉, Gotō Ben, 17 November 1929 – 16 June 2020) was a Japanese journalist and writer best known for his books on Nostradamus.

== Early life and career ==
Goto was born into a Christian family in Hakodate, Hokkaido. Raised Russian Orthodox, his mother spoke to him often about Biblical prophecy. Stories of Armageddon had been handed down from his grandmother, who was one of the first believers in Japan through the missionary work conducted by Saint Nicholas.

Early in his career, Gotō published works dealing with issues of the Second World War as well as several books supportive of Sōka Gakkai and its controversial leader, Daisaku Ikeda. In 1969, while working as a freelance writer for various women's magazines, his interest in Nostradamus was piqued while watching the Apollo 11 Moon landing. He recalled having read about such an event in Nostradamus' quatrains. In 1973, he published a book named "ノストラダムスの大予言" (Nostradamus no daiyogen; "The Prophecies of Nostradamus"), which introduced Nostradamus and his prophecies to a mainstream Japanese audience. A film version was released in 1974.

== The Prophecies of Nostradamus ==
His writings were described as tapping into Japan's deep insecurity and vulnerability about living in a troubled world. He focused particularly on a quatrain appearing to predict a catastrophe occurring in 1999. Books on prophecy sold well in Japan at that time. Common themes included oil shock, dollar devaluation, the stock-market collapse, the rise and fall of real-estate prices in Tokyo, a trade war with America, volcanic eruptions and the threat of catastrophic earthquakes. The work became a runaway bestseller and sparked a "Nostradamus boom" in Japanese publishing.

On November 5, 1991, Goto published Predictions of Nostradamus: Middle-East Chapter, a description of how Nostradamus' quatrains pointed to a war in the Middle East. This was his seventh book on the subject, and sold 400,000 copies in 6 months. By 1991, the combined total of his Nostradamus output had sold 5.4 million copies.(4)

== Quotations ==
"I wanted to warn people. I was afraid humans would become extinct because of radiation or a nuclear winter."

"During my primary school years, it was widely believed that humanity would never make it to the 21st century. I myself expected to be dead by the age of 30."

"When I published that book in 1973, the possibility existed of World War III between the United States and the Soviet Union. An end-of-the-world scenario by 1999 seemed fully imaginable."

"People today still harness their prosperity to produce weapons of murder. It's terrifying to ponder what might happen if nuclear weapons fall into the hands of terrorists. You can say that Nostradamus did foresee the present world situation."
