= Miracle Girl =

- Starring: Kaoru Yumi; Mihoko Fujita; Masumi Okada
- Narrated by: Rokurō Naya
- Composer: Takeo Watanabe
- Country of origin: Japan
- Original language: Japanese
- No. of episodes: 19

Original release
- Network: Tokyo Channel 12
- Release: March 24 – July 28, 1980

Miracle Girl (ミラクルガール) is a 1980 Japanese television series. The series was cancelled after 19 episodes.

== Cast ==
- Kaoru Yumi as Michiko Katsura
- Mihoko Fujita as Kanako Matsubara
- Hiroko Isayama as Yoshie Ishida (episodes 1–4)
- Akiko Hyūga as Tamami Aizawa
- Reiko Itsuki as Yuriko Mine
- Nancy Cheney as Anna Hida
- Hoan Yuki as Jun (episodes 1–13)
- Yūki Mizuhara as Hikari Haruno (from episode 5)
- Aya Fujieda as Maki Asaka (from episode 14)
- Masumi Okada as Chief Detective Yūji Seki
