= Godzilla vs. Hedorah =

1971 film by Yoshimitsu Banno

- Theatrical release poster

Japanese name
- Kanji: ゴジラ対ヘドラ
Transcriptions
- Revised Hepburn: Gojira tai Hedra
- Directed by: Yoshimitsu Banno
- Written by: Yoshimitsu Banno; Kaoru Mabuchi
- Produced by: Tomoyuki Tanaka
- Starring: Akira Yamauchi; Toshio Shiba; Hiroyuki Kawase; Keiko Mari; Toshie Kimura
- Cinematography: Yōichi Manoda
- Edited by: Yoshitami Kuroiwa
- Music by: Riichirō Manabe
- Production company: Toho
- Distributed by: Toho
- Release date: July 24, 1971
- Running time: 85 minutes
- Country: Japan
- Language: Japanese
- Budget: ¥100 million
- Box office: ¥290–300 million

Godzilla vs. Hedorah (Japanese: ゴジラ対ヘドラ, Hepburn: Gojira tai Hedora) is a 1971 Japanese kaiju film directed and co-written by Yoshimitsu Banno, with special effects by Teruyoshi Nakano. Produced and distributed by Toho Co., Ltd., it is the 11th film in the Godzilla franchise and Banno's directorial debut. The film stars Akira Yamauchi, Toshio Shiba, Hiroyuki Kawase, Keiko Mari, and Toshie Kimura, with Haruo Nakajima as Godzilla and Kenpachiro Satsuma as Hedorah. The film features an environmentalist message as symbolized by Hedorah being spawned from pollution. It was released in the United States as Godzilla vs. the Smog Monster.

Producer Tomoyuki Tanaka offered Banno the opportunity to direct a Godzilla film shortly after working together on the Mitsubishi Pavilion at Expo '70. Franchise veterans Kaoru Mabuchi and Ishirō Honda were tasked with assisting Banno with scripting and directing the film respectively. Tanaka was hospitalized for the majority of the production, and Banno took advantage of this to include a scene he thought Tanaka would have otherwise rejected. Principal photography took 35 days with a crew of around 50 on an estimated ¥100 million budget.

Godzilla vs. Hedorah was distributed in Japan on July 24, 1971, as part of the Toho Champion Festival. It was a moderate box office success, grossing ¥290–300 million, and largely ignored by Japanese critics. The few contemporary reviews of the film were generally unfavorable, with particular criticism being given to the scene where Godzilla uses his atomic breath to fly.

Godzilla vs. Hedorah is now considered a cult classic and has often been described as the most "unique" film in the Godzilla franchise. Retrospective critical reviews have been mixed to positive. Roger Ebert, Adam Wingard, and Nicolas Cage have hailed the film as their favorite in the Godzilla series. Banno proposed numerous follow-ups until he died in 2017. Although none of his submissions have ever come to fruition, one ultimately led to the production of Godzilla (2014), for which he served as an executive producer. A short based on the film premiered at Godzilla Fest 2021 in celebration of the film's 50th anniversary.

The film was followed by Godzilla vs. Gigan, released on March 12, 1972.

== Plot ==
Hedorah, an individual of a species of amorphous extraterrestrial alien from the Horsehead Nebula, is transported to Earth by a comet. Upon arrival, it feeds on Earth's pollutants and grows into a poisonous sea monster with the ability to produce sulfuric acid. After it sinks an oil tanker and attacks Dr. Toru Yano and his young son Ken, scarring the doctor, Hedorah's toxic existence is revealed to the public. Ken has visions of Godzilla fighting the world's pollution and insists Godzilla will come to mankind's aid against Hedorah.

Hedorah metamorphoses into an amphibious form, allowing it to move onto land to feed on additional sources of pollution. As Hedorah makes its way to a power station to consume the smoke from its chimneys, it is confronted by Godzilla. Hedorah is easily overpowered by Godzilla and retreats into the ocean. However, during the fight, several pieces of Hedorah's body are flung off, which then crawl back into the sea to grow anew and allow Hedorah to become even more powerful. It returns shortly afterwards in its flying form, then assuming its full form, which demonstrates some of the strongest powers it has access to yet.

Thousands of people across Japan are killed in Hedorah's raids. As hope fades, a party is thrown on Mount Fuji to celebrate one last day of life before the country—and then, the rest of the world—succumbs to Hedorah's unstoppable power. Ken, Yukio Keuchi, Miki Fujinomiya, and the other partygoers realize that Godzilla and Hedorah have also converged on Mount Fuji for a decisive confrontation. During the battle, Godzilla is quickly outmatched by Hedorah's impressive durability and fearsome strength, losing an eye and sustaining a full thickness chemical burn to a hand - right down to the bone - from contact with Hedorah's acidic body and blood, which corrodes anything that comes into contact with it. Finally, Godzilla is almost killed by Hedorah after the alien throws Godzilla into a pit, then attempts to drown Godzilla with a deluge of chemical sludge.

Dr. Toru and his wife Toshie have determined that drying out Hedorah's body may destroy the otherwise unkillable monster. While Godzilla and Hedorah fought, the JSDF swiftly constructed two gigantic electrodes for this purpose and switch them on in an effort to give Godzilla a chance to escape the pit and return to the fight.

Suddenly, the electrodes short out, the power cut off by Godzilla and Hedorah's violent battle. Godzilla reactivates and energizes the electrodes with its atomic breath, which dehydrates Hedorah's exterior. Hedorah's body splits open, and the alien tries to escape using its flying form, but Godzilla propels itself through the air using its atomic breath as a jet to give chase. Godzilla drags Hedorah back to the electrodes and continues to dehydrate it until Hedorah is on the brink of defeat. Godzilla tears open Hedorah's dried-out body and exposes it to the electrodes again, dehydrating pieces of Hedorah's remains until they disintegrate into dust. Godzilla returns to the ocean, but not before pausing to gaze sternly at the surviving humans. Ken bids farewell to Godzilla.

== Cast ==
- Akira Yamauchi as Dr. Toru Yano. A scientist who studies Hedorah and discovers its origins and weaknesses. His dedication to understanding the creature highlights the human struggle against environmental disasters
- Hiroyuki Kawase as Ken Yano. Toru's son, whose perspective provides a personal and emotional connection to the devastation caused by Hedorah. His observations often drive the narrative forward.
- Toshie Kimura as Toshie Yano
- Keiko Mari as Miki Fujinomiya. A nightclub singer
- Toshio Shiba as Yukio Keuchi. A friend of Ken’s family, who aids in the fight against Hedorah. His character represents the collective effort needed to tackle environmental issues.
- Yoshio Yoshida as Gohei, a fisherman
- Haruo Suzuki as JSDF senior officer
- Yoshio Katsube as JSDF engineer
- Tadashi Okabe as a scholar
- Wataru Ōmae as a policeman
- Takuya Yuki as a communications officer
- Yukihiko Gondo as a helicopter pilot
- Haruo Nakazawa as a teenager in the meadow
- Kentaro Watanabe as a TV news anchor
- Haruo Nakajima as Godzilla
- Kenpachiro Satsuma (credited as Kengo Nakayama) as Hedorah, the extraterrestrial smog monster and the film's main antagonist. Satsuma later would portray Godzilla in Heisei era-film series.

Assistant director Kōichi Kawakita makes an uncredited cameo appearance as a bar customer.

== Production ==
=== Development ===
Producer Tomoyuki Tanaka offered Banno the opportunity to direct a Godzilla film shortly after working together on the Mitsubishi Pavilion at Expo '70. Due to Banno's inexperience, franchise veterans Kaoru Mabuchi and Ishirō Honda were tasked with assisting him with scripting and directing the film respectively. Tanaka's declining health led to him being hospitilized for the majority of production, and Banno took advantage of this to include a scene where Godzilla chases Hedorah by using his atomic breath to fly, which reportedly resulted in Tanaka loathing the film and refusing to give Banno another chance to direct a Godzilla film.

Director Banno initially conceived the idea for Godzilla vs. Hedorah after seeing cities like Yokkaichi covered in black smog and the ocean filled with foam from dumped detergent and formulated the story of an alien tadpole transforming into a monster as a result of the pollution.

=== Filming and special effects ===
The film marked director Banno's directorial debut, but the budget for Godzilla vs. Hedorah was significantly lower than previous Godzilla films. Banno was only given 35 days to shoot the film and only had one team available to shoot both the drama and monster effects scenes. Veteran Godzilla director Ishirō Honda was later tasked by producer Tomoyuki Tanaka to watch Banno's rough cut and provide advice.

Teruyoshi Nakano provided the special effects for the film and worked alongside Banno in order to make a film that spoke about the dangers of environmental pollution in the same way the original Godzilla addressed the threat of nuclear weapons. Nakano and Banno often differed on how they should approach the movie with Nakano favored a tone and approach similar to the original Godzilla, while Banno wanted to make a film more directed towards children. The original script didn't feature Godzilla flying, but Banno wanted something "extraordinary" for the film. Nakano reluctantly added in the sequence, saying later in life he felt it was mistake in doing so. In order to alleviate the bleak tone several comedic scenes were added by Nakano.

Kenpachiro Satsuma, the actor who played Hedorah, was struck with appendicitis shortly after production as he was giving a publicity interview to a newspaper while only loosely wearing the heavy Hedorah costume. He had to be rushed off to surgery. During the appendectomy, Satsuma learned that painkillers had no effect on him.

Director Yoshimitsu Banno was going to make a sequel to this film, but it was scrapped due to the fact that Tomoyuki Tanaka reportedly hated Godzilla vs. Hedorah, so he fired Yoshimitsu Banno. The next film was going to be called Godzilla vs. Redmoon, but this was scrapped and later became Daigoro vs. Goliath, then they planned a new film called Godzilla vs. The Space Monsters: Earth Defensive Directive, but this was also scrapped and then became The Return of King Ghidorah, which was also scrapped, after which they ultimately made Godzilla vs. Gigan.

The film also includes animated sequences, which were intended to convey the environmental message.

Godzilla vs. Hedorah features a relatively uncelebrated cast, as requested by Banno.

== Release ==
Godzilla vs. Hedorah was a moderate box office success in Japan, where it grossed ¥290–300 million. In 2019, to celebrate the lives of Banno and Nakajima (both of whom died in 2017), it was the 22 film screened as part of the National Film Archive of Japan's "In Memory of Film Figures We Lost in 2017-2018" event.

The film was released in February 1972 by American International Pictures under the title Godzilla vs. the Smog Monster. There were several small alterations: dialogue was dubbed into English by Titan Productions, several shots with Japanese text were replaced with English or textless equivalents, additional sound effects and Foley were added to some scenes, and the song "Save the Earth" (based on "Give Back the Sun!", a song in the original Japanese version of the film) was added. This version was rated 'G' by the MPAA, and the same version was given an 'A' certificate by the BBFC for its UK theatrical release in 1975.

The AIP version has been replaced in the North American home video and television markets (including Sony's DVD and Kraken Releasing's DVD and Blu-ray) by Toho's international version, titled Godzilla vs. Hedorah. This version features the original English dub produced in Hong Kong and by extension lacks the English-language song "Save the Earth". This version was first broadcast in the United States by the Sci-Fi Channel on January 20, 1996.

=== Home media ===
The film was released on VHS by Orion Pictures in 1989 and on DVD by Sony Pictures Home Entertainment on October 19, 2004. The film received another DVD release and a Blu-ray release by Kraken Releasing on May 6, 2014. A video transfer of Godzilla vs. The Smog Monster was released in Canada on DVD packaged with Godzilla vs. Megalon by Digital Disc. In 2019, the Japanese version was included in a Blu-ray box set released by the Criterion Collection, which included all 15 films from the franchise's Shōwa era.

In 2021, Toho premiered a 4K remaster of the film on the Nippon Classic Movie Channel, along with seven other Godzilla films also remastered in 4K. The film was downscaled to 2K for broadcast. UHD and bluray discs of this remaster are scheduled for release in Japan on December 20, 2023.

== Reception ==
=== Contemporaneous ===
According to Banno, Japanese critics generally ignored Godzilla vs. Hedorah, but those who did review it unanimously panned it, with the exception of the Yomiuri Shimbun. Nakano described initial responses as polarized, with divisive notices from newspapers and mixed reviews from magazines. Later publications noted how reviewers conflicted about the scene where Godzilla uses his atomic breath to fly, although Nakano claimed that it was praised in the United States.

In July 1972, Vincent Canby of The New York Times described the film as the "most blatant of all of the pollution pictures". He felt viewers would not be inclined to protest against pollution after watching the movie, and opposed this notation. Alan Cookman of the Evening Sentinel called the film a "curious—and curiously fascinating—Japanese import [that] is more of a tongue-in-cheek effort than you might imagine", venturing that six-to-twelve-year-olds would likely enjoy it most. He added that, "With wide screen, good colour and effects which include occasional lapses into animation and splitscreen, it is technically quite impressive. Twenty years ago I would have lapped it up."

The film was featured in the 1978 book The Fifty Worst Films of All Time by Harry Medved with Randy Dreyfuss. The book quoted a few Western reviews of the film, including Leonard Maltin calling it "dubbed and daffy"; the San Francisco Chronicle panning it; and The Monster Times saying it was "one of the worst monster films ever; an idiotic kiddie show!"

=== Retrospective ===
Godzilla vs. Hedorah has received mixed—mostly positive—retrospective reviews. On the review aggregator website Rotten Tomatoes, 67% of 15 critics' reviews are positive, with an average rating of 5.5/10.

In 1998, a reviewer for Stomp Tokyo wrote that the film has "many obvious, crippling flaws" but praised the monster action, and commended the lack of reliance on stock footage and the effort put into the animated segments. In 2004, Stuart Galbraith IV, writing for DVD Talk, stated that the film "earns points for trying something new, to break away from what was fast becoming a tired formula. The film isn't as entertaining as Godzilla vs. Gigan or Godzilla vs. Mechagodzilla, but it is more original and daring, and ... fans will want to pick [it] up."

In their 2018 book Japan's Green Monsters, Sean Rhoads and Brooke McCorkle offer an ecocritical assessment of Godzilla vs. Hedorah. The scholars argue that viewing Godzilla vs. Hedorah through three lenses—those being Japanese environmental history, the monster movie genre, and the historical trends that crippled the Japanese film industry—provides a new understanding of the film and Banno's intentions. Rhoads and McCorkle specifically counter prior poor reviews of the film like those proffered by Medved and Galbraith, and argue that Godzilla vs. Hedorah possesses deeper environmental appeals than the obvious ones present on the film's surface.

Roger Ebert of the Chicago Sun-Times, in his review panning Godzilla 1985, cited Godzilla vs. Hedorah as his favorite Godzilla movie.

In a December 1996 interview with Cinefantastique, Nakano, the effects artist for the film, stated his thoughts on Godzilla vs. Hedorah:

"Looking back, the movie seems kind of cruel and heavy handed. I was trying to show the serious threat of pollution with scenes of Godzilla's eyes being burned and people dying. I guess I became uncomfortable with it even while we were filming, that’s why we added the comical scenes."

== Legacy ==
After director Yoshimitsu Banno finished directing Godzilla vs. Hedorah, he began work on creating another installment in the Godzilla series. Like his first Godzilla movie, Banno had wanted the next film to have a strong message against pollution. The initial idea was that a mutant starfish-like monster battles Godzilla. However, he scrapped this idea and wrote what was going to be Godzilla vs. Hedorah 2. In it, Godzilla was to fight another Hedorah, this time in Africa. Due to Tomoyuki Tanaka's reaction to Banno's first Godzilla film, this was never realized.

Banno spent several years trying to acquire funding for a 40-minute IMAX 3D Godzilla film starring a new version of Hedorah called Deathla. The project was tentatively titled Godzilla 3D: To The Max. The project was eventually scrapped but several members of the production team, including Banno, would work on the 2014 Godzilla. In November 2013, Banno stated that he still hoped to make a sequel to Godzilla vs. Hedorah, but died in 2017. He also served as an executive producer of Godzilla: King of the Monsters (2019) and Godzilla vs. Kong (2021), both of which were released after his death.

== Cancelled sequel ==
Yoshimitsu Banno was so pleased with Godzilla vs. Hedorah that he started writing another Godzilla film. Banno began preparing a script for Godzilla vs. Hedorah 2. However, Tomoyuki Tanaka, who was hospitalized during the production of Godzilla vs. Hedorah, was dissatisfied with the final product and was rumored to have gone as far as to tell Banno that he had "ruined Godzilla," though Banno never confirmed that he did. Tanaka prevented Banno from directing another Toho film afterwards and demoted him from director to producer on several upcoming films.

According to Banno though, from later interviews conducted with him, Godzilla vs. Hedorah 2 was actually still being worked on after he was removed from the project. Whether the film was going to keep its Africa setting at this stage is not known. The project was eventually scrapped and three more proposed projects would be introduced that following year before finally settling on Godzilla vs. Gigan (1972). In a 2014 interview, Banno stated that he read a Godzilla film history book from the US and that he was surprised to read that the next film would take place in Africa and that Tanaka had said that he had banned him from his director position.

A single remnant of Banno's intentions to produce a sequel exists in the finished film. At the end of the film, a cliffhanger sequence features an illustration of Hedorah's tadpole form, followed by a black screen with red text stating "And yet another one?", suggesting that Banno was in the process of preparing, or had already prepared a sequel premise for approval.
