= Terror Beneath the Sea =

- Theatrical release poster

Japanese name
- Kanji: 海底大戦争
Transcriptions
- Revised Hepburn: Kaitei Daisensō
- Directed by: Hajime Sato
- Screenplay by: Kōichi Ōtsu
- Produced by: Koji Kameda; Seiichi Yoshino; Masafumi Soga
- Starring: Sonny Chiba; Peggy Neal; Franz Gruber; Andrew Hughes; Tadashi Suganuma; Hideo Murota
- Cinematography: Kazuo Shimomura
- Edited by: Tomio Soda
- Music by: Shunsuke Kikuchi
- Production companies: Toei Company; Ram Films
- Distributed by: Toei
- Release date: July 1, 1966 (Japan)
- Running time: 84 minutes (Japan); 79 minutes (United States)
- Countries: Japan; United States
- Languages: Japanese; English (dubbed)

Terror Beneath the Sea (Japanese: 海底大戦争, Hepburn: Kaitei Daisensō; lit. 'The Great Undersea War') (Note: also known as Water Cyborg, Agent X-2: Operation Underwater, and Battle Beneath the Sea) is a 1966 science fiction horror film directed by Hajime Sato. An international co-production of Japan and the United States, it stars Sonny Chiba, Peggy Neal, Franz Gruber, Andrew Hughes, Tadashi Suganuma, and Hideo Murota.

== Plot ==
The story follows reporter Ken Abe and photographer Jenny Gleason as they attend a torpedo test by the US navy, which has a mysterious swimming body appear during it. This and other irregularity cause the pair to investigate, which leads them to a cave inhabited by silver fish-men, who capture the pair.

The pair is eventually taken to the underwater base of the enigmatic Professor Moore, who has created these fish-men or "water cyborgs." The Water Cyborgs lack free will and are intended to be his soldiers in his task to unify the world under him and make people compliant in his 'Utopia'. The process of transforming ordinary humans into these creatures is shown in graphic detail throughout the procedure, disturbing Jenny and Ken.

A US Navy submarine searching for the missing couple as well as a kidnapped scientist stumbles upon the base, interrupting the process of Ken and Jenny's transformation, though both are left scarred. The base and submarine engage in deadly combat using torpedoes and missiles until a hit disrupts the control mechanism of the Water Cyborgs and they begin indiscriminately killing everyone they come across. While attempting to escape, Ken, Jenny, and the scientist run into the leader of the base attempting to do the same, eventually resulting in the leader's death. A navy diver rescues them from the base.

Awakening in the hospital, Jenny is at first terrified of being seen in her altered appearance, only to find their fellow rescuee knew the process to reverse the procedure and she and Ken have been restored, and Jenny excitedly tells her boss she has a story for him, before she and Jen go for a walk on the beach together.

== Cast ==
- Sonny Chiba as Ken Abe
- Peggy Neal as Jenny Gleason
- Franz Gruber as Lieutenant Colonel Brown
- Andrew Hughes as Professor Howard
- Tadashi Suganuma as Nishida
- Hideo Murota as Navy Base Engineer A
- Osamu Yamanouchi as Navy Base Engineer B
- Ichiro Mizuki as Navy Base Engineer D
- Beverly Kahler as Luisa
- Mike Daneen as Dr. Josef Heim
- Enver Altenbay as Reporter A

== Release ==
Terror Beneath the Sea was released in Japan on July 1, 1966. The film did not receive a theatrical release in the United States, instead being released directly to television by Teleworld.

== Reception ==
=== International response ===
Critical response outside of Japan has been mixed to negative. Jon Condit of Dread Central rated it two out of five stars, writing "Terror Beneath The Sea is the epitome of a disposable movie. It's utter nonsense from beginning to end and never takes the time to develop any characters or allow for the story to build naturally".

== Bibliography ==
- Barsanti, Chris (September 22, 2014). The Sci-Fi Movie Guide: The Universe of Film from Alien to Zardoz. Visible Ink Press. ISBN 978-1-5785-9533-4.
