= Prophecies of Nostradamus =

- Theatrical release poster
- Directed by: Toshio Masuda
- Screenplay by: Toshio Yasumi; Toshio Masuda; Yoshimitsu Banno
- Based on: Prophecies of Nostradamus: The Approaching Month of July 1999 and the Day of Humanity's Collapse by Ben Goto
- Produced by: Tomoyuki Tanaka; Osamu Tanaka
- Starring: Tetsuro Tamba; Toshio Kurosawa; Kaoru Yumi
- Cinematography: Rokuro Nishigaki
- Edited by: Nobuo Ogawa
- Music by: Isao Tomita
- Production companies: Toho-Eizo; Toho
- Distributed by: Toho
- Release date: 3 August 1974 (Japan)
- Running time: 112 minutes
- Country: Japan
- Budget: ¥650 million
- Box office: ¥883 million

Prophecies of Nostradamus (Japanese: ノストラダムスの大予言, Hepburn: Nosutoradamusu no daiyogen) is a 1974 Japanese disaster film directed by Toshio Masuda, with Yoshimitsu Banno serving as an associate director. The film was based on a 1973 novel by Ben Goto, itself inspired by the prophecies of Nostradamus.

== Plot ==
In 1853, Genta Nishiyama begins preaching the prophecies of Michel de Nostradame using a copy of his book Centuries. When Nishiyama is executed by the Tokugawa Shogunate for supposed heresy (after discussing the arrival of "black ships" that will end Japan's long isolation), his wife and son flee with the book in hand, passing down the knowledge to future generations. At the onset of World War II, his descendant, Gengaku, is interrogated by an Imperial Japanese Army officer about the family's continued preaching of the prophecies, which predicted the rise of Nazism and the defeat of the Axis powers.

In the present day of 1999, biologist Dr. Ryogen Nishiyama is called in to analyze recent scientific phenomena, such as the appearance of large mutant slugs, children wielding advanced abilities after drinking water near a zinc mine, and large ice packs just north of Hawaii. He is also a leading figure in the fight against environmental pollution, natural disasters, and the global arms race. The U.N. sends a research expedition to New Guinea to investigate a radioactive dust cloud that appeared over the island, but the team suddenly goes out of all contact. Nishiyama joins a second team to find them and discover that the area around the team's last known position is now infested by large mutant bats and leeches; one leech renders a team member unconscious and he later turns violently insane after the team sets up camp. He is sedated, but is later feasted on by cannibals. The team fight off the cannibals and chase them into a cave, where they find the remains of the original group, but are disheartened that some of them are barely alive; they are forced to kill and bury the survivors.

A SST jet explodes in the atmosphere over Japan, with the explosion puncturing the ozone layer and unleashing ultraviolet radiation below. The polar icecaps melt, triggering massive floods in Japan. After more natural disasters hit the country, the civilian populace turns to looting as rationing takes effect. Society breaks down further, with several people committing suicide. The panic escalates until nuclear war breaks out, devastating humanity. Most of the survivors are left mutated, and fight each other for food among the ruins of civilization.

It is revealed that the nuclear war is one of many nightmare scenarios Nishiyama is explaining before the Japanese Cabinet. As the prime minister explains a resolve to find a solution, Nishiyama, his daughter Mariko, and her boyfriend Akira (a globetrotting photographer) leave the Diet building.

== Cast ==
- Tetsurō Tamba as Dr. Nishiyama
- Toshio Kurosawa as Akira Nakagawa
- Kaoru Yumi as Mariko Nishiyama
- Yoko Tsukasa as Nobue Nishiyama
- Akihiko Hirata as a Botanist
- Hiroshi Koizumi as a Zoologist
- Masahiko Tanimura as Tayama
- Mizuho Suzuki as the Minister of the Environment Agency
- Taketoshi Naito as the Chief Cabinet Secretary
- Tappie Shimokawa as Self-Defense Forces Commander
- So Yamamura as Prime Minister
- Takashi Shimura as a Pediatrician
- Katsuhiko Sasaki as Yoshihama
- Katsu Ryuzaki as Daikon
- Jun Hamamura as Kida
- Kazuo Kato, Kuniyasu Atsumi, Takeshi Kitazawa at Scholars
- Yoshiro Aoki as Mjr. Kashio
- Kazuko Inano as Hamako
- Sayoko Kato as a Bus Guide at Shikoku
- Kumeko Otowa as Kida's Wife
- Toshiko Yabuki as a Housewife
- Tatsu Nakamura as Katsuko
- Kaori Taniguchi as Orin
- Chosei Muto as Ibara
- Mikizo Hirata as Sanji
- Yasuko Agawa as Kida's Daughter (as Tomoe Mari)
- Kyōko Kishida as the narrator

== Production ==
This was Toho's second disaster movie following the previous year's Submersion of Japan. It was based on Ben Goto's book The Great Prophecy of Nostradamus, released in November 1973. Shinya Nishimaru, general manager of the Food General Office within the Ministry of Agriculture and Forestry, published a book with Goto presenting a pessimistic view of the future of the food supply and environment. This work inspired part of the film's development. Some effects sequences were re-used from Japan Sinks and The Last War, such as nuclear attack and earthquake scenes. Others, such as depicting cedar-covered mountains turning brown from excessive UV radiation, were done by dispersing diluted sulfuric acid on part of the forest.

A proposed sequel was to be called Prophecies of Nostradamus 2: Lord of Terror. The premise was for the audience of a Ben Goto lecture slipping through time to July 1999, witnessing the apocalyptic events of Nostradamus’ quatrains.

In May 1974, while shooting a forest fire effects scene, the miniatures ignited and burned out of control. Toho's Studio 7 in Kinuta, Setagaya-Ku was a total loss, though there were no injuries.

== Release ==
Prophecies of Nostradamus was released theatrically in Japan on 3 August 1974 where it was distributed by Toho. Toho released their 90-minute international version in the United States on 13 July 1979. It was later released to television by United Productions of America as The Last Days of Planet Earth with English dubbing. The television print runs 88 minutes in length. It was released on EP VHS in the 1990s by Paramount Home Video.

Prophecies of Nostradamus is infamous for its depiction of mutated human beings. After the film was released, a protest group lodged a complaint with the Eirin (the Japanese film ratings board), citing the New Guinea sequence and the post-climactic scene featuring two mutants. Toho publicly apologized, and after briefly pulling the film from theaters, re-issued it in December 1974 with 105 seconds of cuts, including the two offending sequences. After its theatrical release and a 1980 television broadcast, the uncut version of the film was officially pulled from circulation by Toho. Plans were made to release the film, with the 105 seconds of edits, on VHS and Laserdisc in the spring of 1986, but were ultimately shelved; as such, the film has never seen an official home video release in Japan. While the original, unedited version has never been officially released anywhere since 1974, time-coded bootleg copies are in circulation. The 90-minute re-cut version does occasionally make appearances in re-releases and it is this version which is on file at the Library of Congress.
