= Eiji Tsuburaya =

Japanese special effects director (1901–1970)

- 円谷 英二
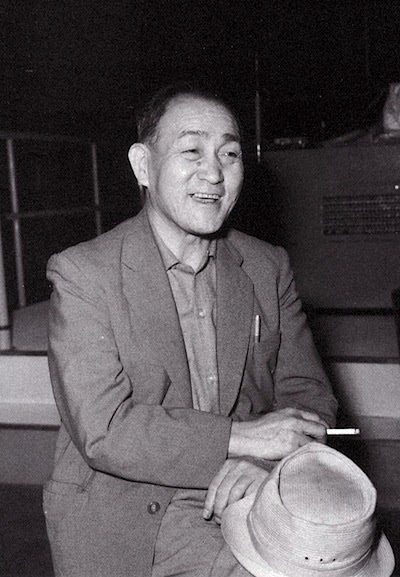
- Tsuburaya during the production of The Three Treasures in 1959
- Born: Eiichi Tsumuraya (Note: His birth name has also been commonly cited as Eiichi Tsuburaya. To avoid investigation into his wartime efforts, Tsuburaya changed his screen name into his legal name after the war.); July 7, 1901 (Note: Sources have listed Tsuburaya's date of birth as July 5, 7 or 10. Although his family initially recorded his birthday as July 10, Tsuburaya himself, his relatives, and his company have credited his birthdate as July 7. The latter date is considered appropriate because it coincides with the Japanese star festival Tanabata.); Sukagawa, Fukushima, Japan
- Died: January 25, 1970 (aged 68); Itō, Shizuoka, Japan
- Resting place: Catholic Fuchū Cemetery, Fuchū, Tokyo
- Education: Tokyo Kanda Electrical Engineering School
- Occupations: Special effects director; film director; cinematographer; screenwriter; editor; television producer; businessman; inventor; aviator
- Years active: 1919–1969
- Works: Full list
- Title: President of Tsuburaya Productions
- Spouse: Masano Araki (m. 1930)
- Children: 4, (Note: His second child, Miyako, died in her juvenescence.) including Hajime, Noboru and Akira
- Relatives: Aōdō Denzen (ancestor); Hiroshi Tsuburaya (grandson)
- Awards: 6 Japan Technical Awards; 3 Japanese Society of Cinematographers Awards
- Military career
- Allegiance: Empire of Japan
- Branch: Imperial Japanese Army
- Service years: 1921–1923

Japanese name
- Kanji: 円谷 英二
- Kana: つぶらや えいじ
Transcriptions
- Romanization: Tsuburaya Eiji
- Website: Official website

Eiji Tsuburaya (Japanese: 円谷 英二, Hepburn: Tsuburaya Eiji; July 7, 1901 – January 25, 1970) was a Japanese special effects director, filmmaker, and cinematographer. A co-creator of the Godzilla and Ultraman franchises, he is considered one of the most important and influential figures in the history of cinema. Tsuburaya is known as the "Father of Tokusatsu", (Note: 特撮の父, Tokusatsu no Chichi; lit. 'Father of special effects'. Also nicknamed the "God of Tokusatsu" (特撮の神様, Tokusatsu no Kamisama; lit. 'God of special effects') and "Japan's Master of Monsters".) having pioneered Japan's special effects industry and introduced several technological developments in film productions. In a career spanning five decades, Tsuburaya worked on approximately 250 films—including globally renowned features directed by Ishirō Honda, Hiroshi Inagaki, and Akira Kurosawa—and earned six Japan Technical Awards.

Following a brief stint as an inventor, Tsuburaya was employed by Japanese cinema pioneer Yoshirō Edamasa in 1919 and began his career working as an assistant cinematographer on Edamasa's A Tune of Pity. Thereafter, he worked as an assistant cinematographer on several films, including Teinosuke Kinugasa's A Page of Madness (1926). At the age of thirty-two, Tsuburaya watched King Kong, which greatly influenced him to work in special effects. Tsuburaya completed the first iron shooting crane in October 1934, and an adaptation of the crane is still in use across the globe today. After filming his directorial debut on the cruiser Asama in the Pacific Ocean, he worked on Princess Kaguya (1935), one of Japan's first major films to incorporate special effects. His first majorly successful film in effects, The Daughter of the Samurai (1937), remarkably featured the first full-scale rear projection.

In 1937, Tsuburaya was employed by Toho and established the company's effects department. Tsuburaya directed the effects for The War at Sea from Hawaii to Malaya in 1942, which became the highest-grossing Japanese film in history upon its release. His elaborate effects were believed to be behind the film's major success, and he won an award for his work from the Japan Motion Picture Cinematographers Association. In 1948, however, Tsuburaya was purged from Toho by the Supreme Commander for the Allied Powers because of his involvement in propaganda films during World War II. Thus, he founded Tsuburaya Special Technology Laboratory with his eldest son Hajime and worked without credit at major Japanese studios outside Toho, creating effects for films such as Daiei's The Invisible Man Appears (1949), widely regarded as the first Japanese science fiction film.

In 1950, Tsuburaya returned to Toho alongside his effects crew from Tsuburaya Special Technology Laboratory. At age fifty-three, he gained international recognition and won his first Japan Technical Award for Special Skill for directing the effects in Ishirō Honda's kaiju film Godzilla (1954). He served as the effects director for Toho's string of financially successful tokusatsu films that followed, including, Rodan (1956), The Mysterians (1957), The Three Treasures (1959), Mothra, The Last War (both 1961), and King Kong vs. Godzilla (1962). In April 1963, Tsuburaya founded Tsuburaya Special Effects Productions; his company would go onto produce the television shows Ultra Q, Ultraman (both 1966), Ultraseven (1967–1968), and Mighty Jack (1968). Ultra Q and Ultraman were extremely successful upon their 1966 broadcast, with Ultra Q making him a household name in Japan and gaining him more attention from the media who dubbed him the "God of Tokusatsu". While he spent his late years working on several Toho films and operating his company, Tsuburaya's health began to decline, and he died in 1970.

== Biography ==
=== Childhood to war years: 1901–1945 ===
==== Childhood and youth (1901–1919) ====
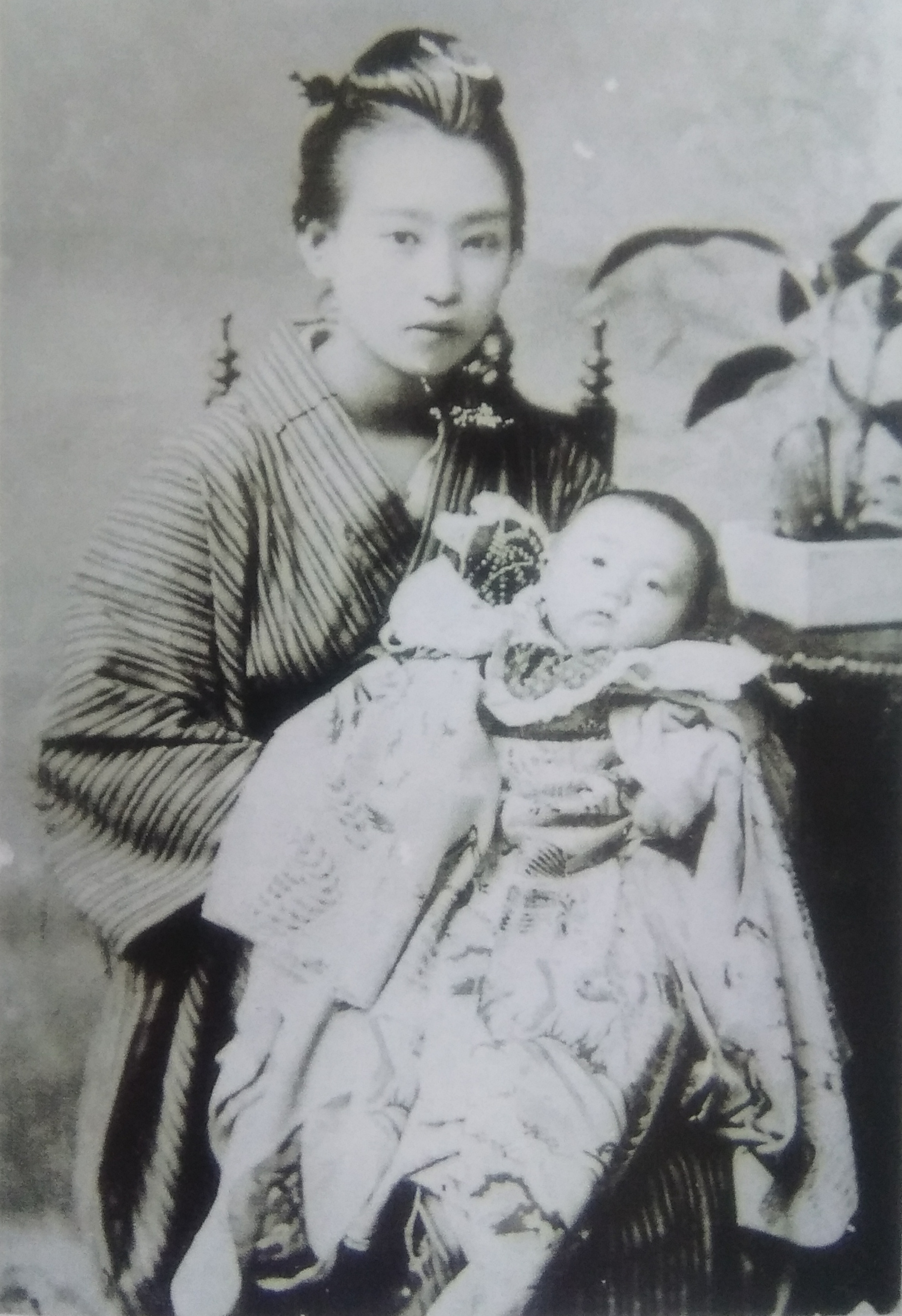
Tsuburaya with his mother Sei, c. 1902. Sei died of illness shortly after giving birth to her second son.

Eiji Tsuburaya was born Eiichi Tsumuraya (圓谷 英一, Tsumuraya Eiichi) on July 7, 1901, at a merchant house called Ōtsukaya in Sukagawa, Iwase, Fukushima Prefecture, where his family ran a malted rice business. (Note: Attributed to multiple references:) He was the first son of Isamu Shiraishi and Sei Tsumuraya, with a large extended family. When Tsuburaya was three years old, his mother Sei died of illness at the age of nineteen, shortly after giving birth to her second son. Bereaved by Sei's death, Shiraishi divorced her posthumously and left the family, leaving Tsuburaya in the care of his grandmother Natsu. Through Natsu, Tsuburaya was related to the Edo period painter Aōdō Denzen, who brought copper printing and Western painting to Japan, from whom Tsuburaya considered to have inherited his manual dexterity. His uncle Ichirō, who was Sei's younger brother, was five years older than him and acted like an elder brother to him. Thus, Tsuburaya began to use the nickname Eiji ("ji" indicating second-born) instead of Eiichi ("ichi" indicating first-born).

In 1908, he started attending the Dai'ichi Jinjo Koto Elementary School in Sukagawa, and it was soon realized that he had a talent for drawing. During his boyhood, Tsuburaya became interested in flying because of the recent success of Japanese aviators; he soon started building model airplanes as a hobby, an interest he would pursue throughout his entire life.

In 1913, Tsuburaya saw his first film, which featured footage of a volcanic eruption on Sakurajima; in the process, he was more fascinated by the projector than the movie itself. In 1958, Tsuburaya told Kinema Junpo that because he was extremely fascinated by the projector, he purchased a "toy movie viewer" and created his own film strips by "carefully cutting rolled paper, then making sprocket holes, and drawing stick figures [on the paper], frame by frame." (Note: Over the years, there have been disputes over this account. Tsuburaya's third son, Akira, suggested that it was converted later because it is improbable that a store in Sukagawa sold any kind of projector at that time.) Because of his craftwork at a young age, he became a provincial celebrity and was interviewed by the Fukushima Minyu Shimbun.

In 1915, at the age of 14, he graduated from junior high school, and begged his family to let him enroll in the Nippon Flying School at Haneda. After the school was closed on account of the accidental death of its founder, Seitaro Tamai, in 1917, Tsuburaya switched to the Tokyo Kanda Electrical Engineering School (now Tokyo Denki University). While at the school, he started working as an inventor at the toy company Utsumi, and devised inventions including the first battery-powered phone capable of making calls, an automatic speed photo box, an "automatic skate" and the toy phone. The latter two earned him a patent fee of ¥500.

==== Early career and marriage (1919–1934) ====
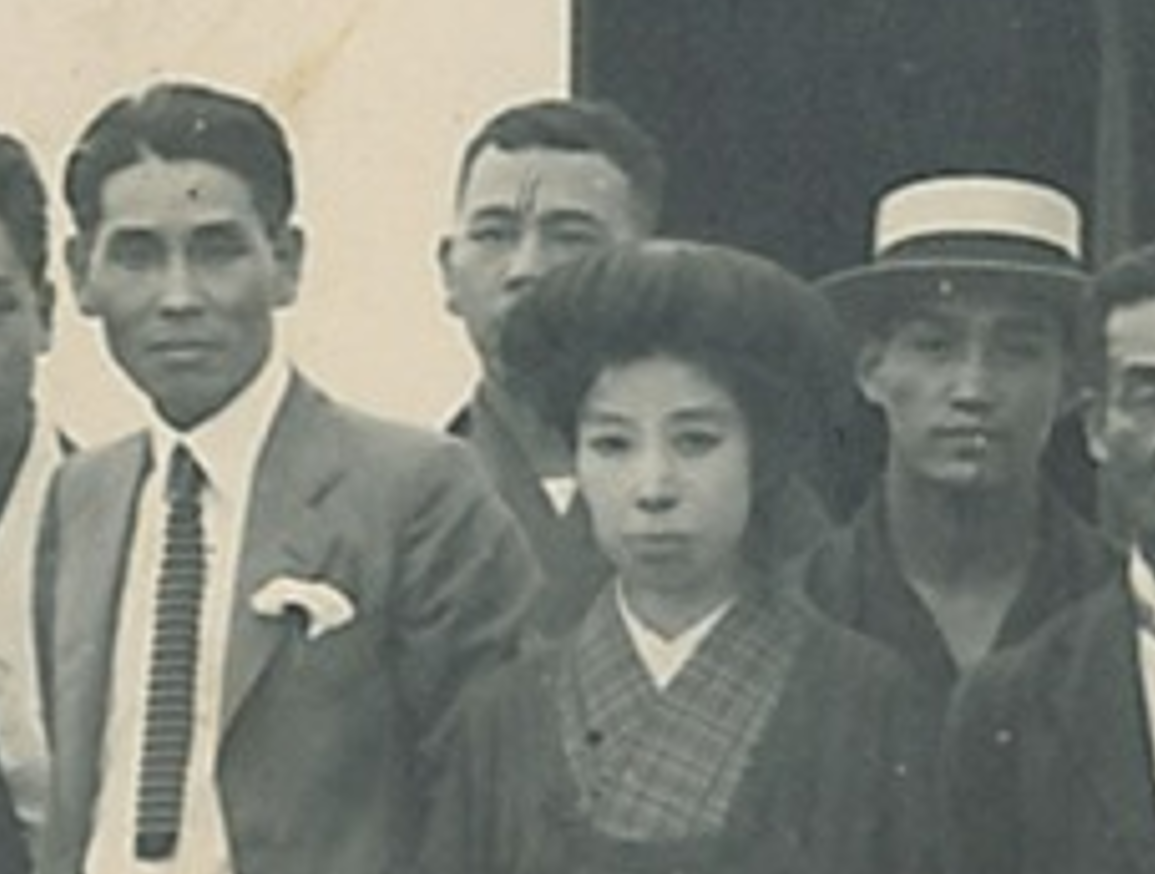
Tsuburaya (far right) with colleagues including his senpai Yoshirō Edamasa (far left) onboard the Korea Maru, c. early 1920s

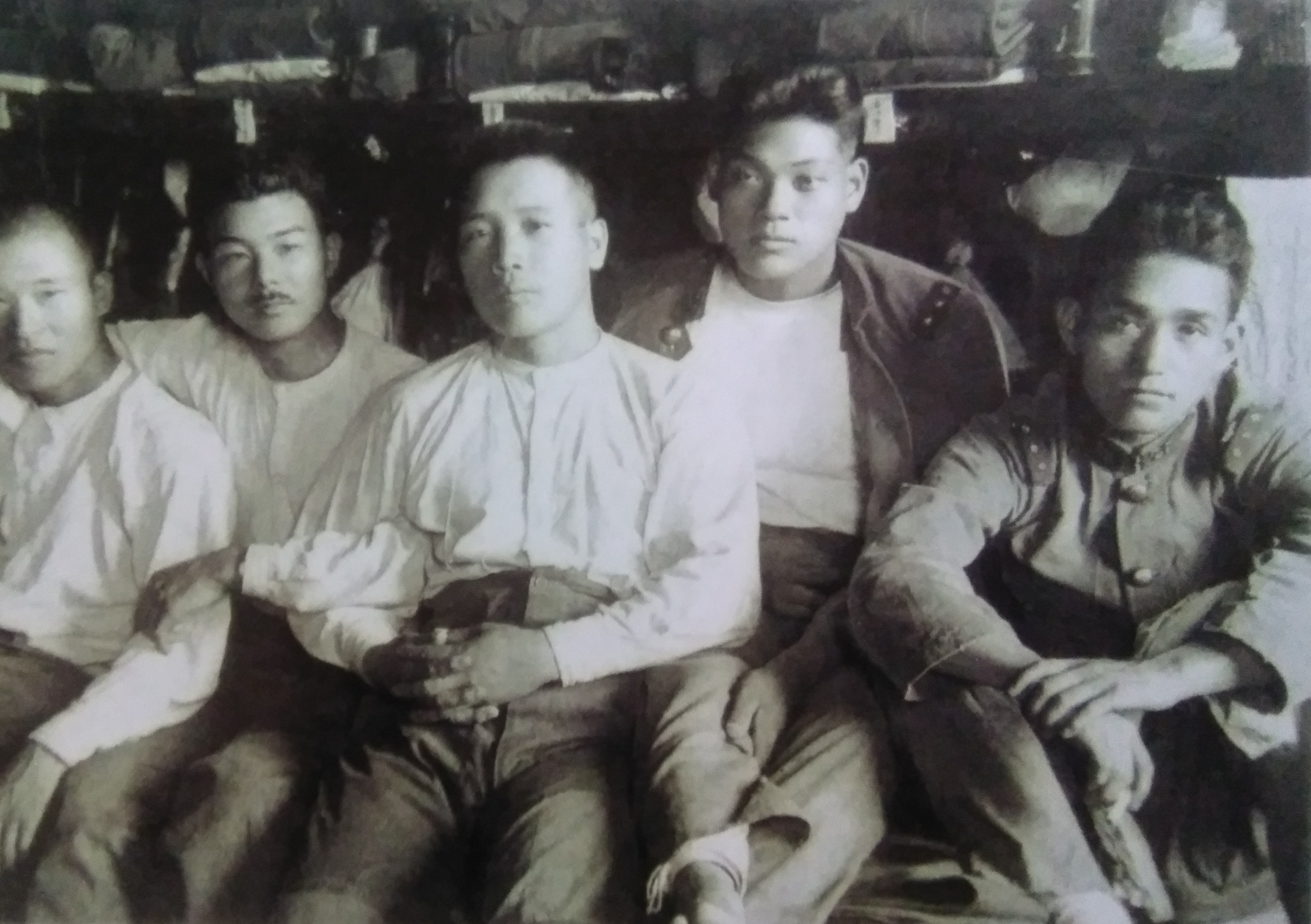
Tsuburaya (far right) with fellow Imperial Japanese Army comrades, c. 1922

During a hanami party held at a tea house in the spring of 1919, Tsuburaya met Yoshirō Edamasa, a pioneer of Japanese cinema. Edamasa asked Tsuburaya if he was interested in movies or photography; after he explained to Edamasa that he was interested in motion pictures, Tsuburaya accepted the director's offer to become an employee at his company, the Natural Color Motion Pictures Company (dubbed "Tenkatsu"). Therefore, Tsuburaya began working in the film industry at the age of eighteen, as Edamasa's camera assistant, contributing to films such as A Tune of Pity (1919) and Tombs of the Island (1920); reportedly, he also served as a screenwriter during this period. Despite Tenkatsu becoming part of the Kokatsu Company and Edamasa leaving his job in March 1920, Tsuburaya kept working at the studio until he was ordered to serve the Imperial Japanese Army between 1921 and December 1922.

After leaving the army in 1923, Tsuburaya moved back to his family's house in Sukagawa. However, he suddenly departed just a few months later, in order to pursue a more established career within the filmmaking industry. In the morning of his departure from home, he left a note: "I won't return home until I succeed in the motion picture business, even if I die trying." The next year, he worked as the cinematographer on the film The Hunchback of Enmei'in Temple. Tsuburaya joined Shochiku in 1925 and would have his breakthrough as the cameraman and assistant director on Teinosuke Kinugasa's A Page of Madness (released the following year). In 1927, he shot Minoru Inuzuka's jidaigeki films Children's Swordplay and Melee, both starring Kazuo Hasegawa and Tsuyako Okajima, as well as Toko Yamazaki's The Bat Copybook, Mad Blade Under the Moon, and Record of the Tragic Swords of the Tenpo Era. Because of the financial success of these films, Tsuburaya started being regarded as one of Kyoto's leading cinematographers.

In 1928, while working on eleven films at Shochiku, Tsuburaya began creating and utilizing new camera operating techniques, including double-exposure and slow-motion camerawork. The next year, Tsuburaya constructed his own smaller version of D. W. Griffith's 140-foot tall shooting crane: having invented it without the benefit of using blueprints or manuals, the wooden crane allowed Tsuburaya to improve camera movement and was able to be used in and outside the studio. The creation proved to be a success, although it did not guarantee total safety: one day, while Tsuburaya and an assistant were preparing the crane in order to film a scene, the structure collapsed, sending him plummeting to the ground of the studio. A witness of the incident, named Masano Araki, was one of the first people to run to his aid: she visited Tsuburaya daily while he was hospitalized, and the pair formed a relationship shortly thereafter. On February 27, 1930, Tsuburaya married the decade-younger Araki. Their first child, Hajime, was born on April 23, 1931.

In May 1932, Tsuburaya, Akira Mimura, Hiroshi Sakai, Kohei Sugiyama, Masao Tamai, and Tadayuki Yokota established the Japan Cameraman Association, which later coalesced with other companies to become the Nippon Cinematographers Club (now known as the Japanese Society of Cinematographers). Shortly after that, the association would start to hold award ceremonies. In November of that same year, Tsuburaya quit Shochiku and joined Nikkatsu Futosou Studios. Around the same time, he began using the professional name "Eiji Tsuburaya".

In 1933, Tsuburaya saw the American film King Kong, which inspired him to work on movies featuring special effects. In 1962, Tsuburaya told the Mainichi Shimbun that he attempted to convince Nikkatsu to "import this technical know-how, but they had little interest in it because, at the time, I was seen as merely a cameraman who worked on Kazuo Hasegawa's historical dramas". He managed to acquire a 35mm print of King Kong and started to study the film's special effects frame-by-frame, without the advantage of documents explaining how they were produced: he would later write an analysis of the film's effects for the magazine Photo Times in October 1933. In the same year, Masano gave birth to a second child, a daughter named Miyako. However, the child would die of unknown causes in 1935.

In December 1933, Nikkatsu granted Tsuburaya permission to use and study new screen projection technology for the company's jidaigeki films. However, while the studio agreed with his decision to project these films cast into a location use using location plates, not all of his technological developments were met with approval. While he was filming the final scenes for Asataro Descends Mt. Akagi in February 1934, Tsuburaya fell out with Nikkatsu's CEO, who had no acquaintance with what Tsuburaya was creating and assumed that he was wasting the company's money. After the argument, Tsuburaya resigned from his job at Nikkatsu.

==== J.O. Studios, directorial works, and Toho (1934–1940) ====
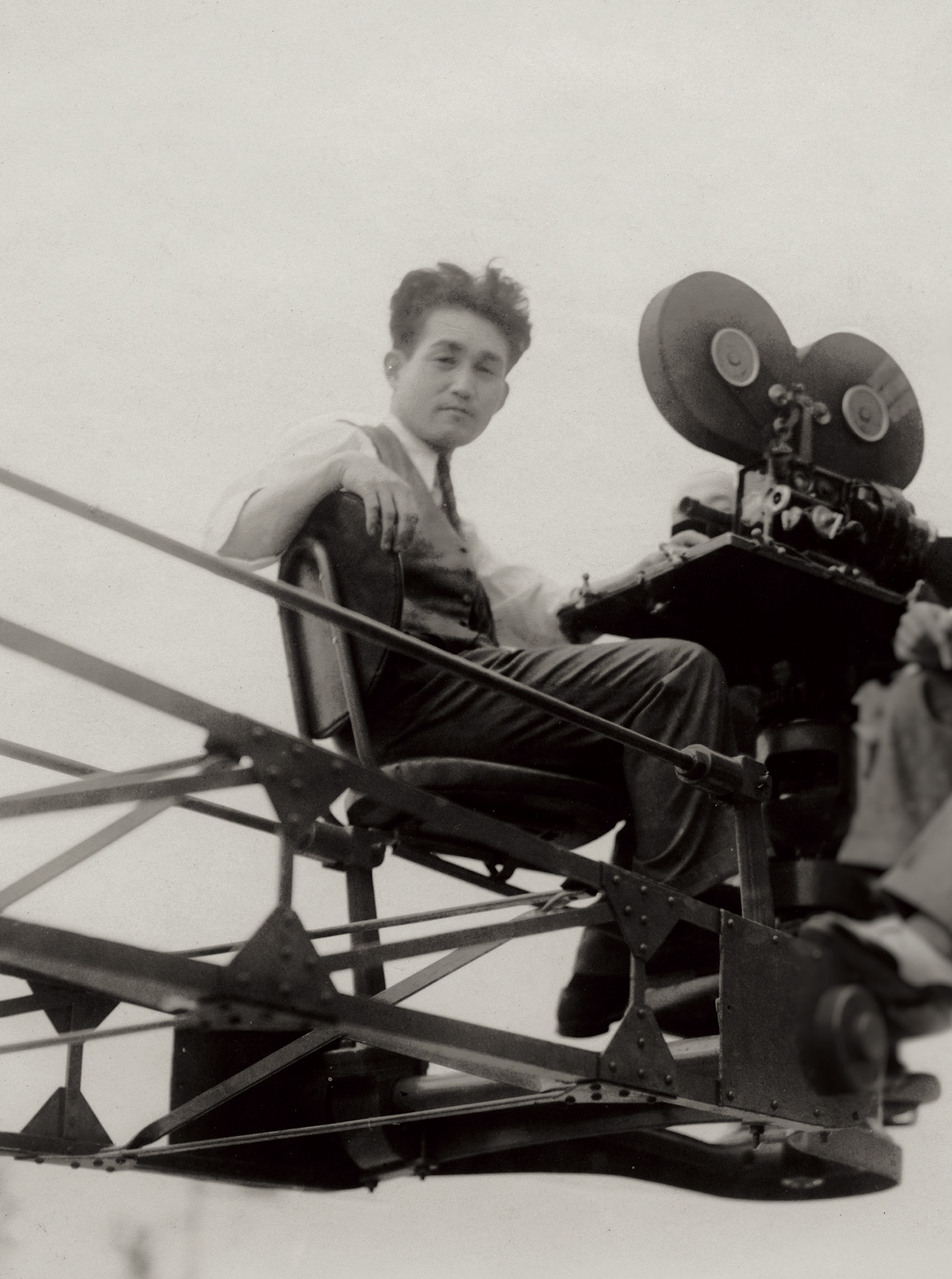
Tsuburaya riding his iron shooting crane in 1934. An adaptation of this crane is still used worldwide today.

Shortly after leaving Nikkatsu, he accepted an offer from Kyoto entrepreneur Yoshio Osawa to work at his company, J.O. Talkies, and research optical printing and screen projection. In October 1934, Tsuburaya and his colleagues completed the first iron shooting crane model and used it to shoot Atsuo Tomioka's The Chorus of a Million. In contrast to his previous prototype, the crane was installed on a truck that operated on tracks, which made it able to change the camera's position in a matter of seconds. In December of that year, Osawa renamed the studio J.O. Studios and designated Tsuburaya as its chief cinematographer.

From February to August 1935, he traveled to Hawaii, the Philippines, Australia, and New Zealand on the cruiser Asama in order to shoot his directorial debut, Three Thousand Miles Across the Equator, a feature-length propaganda documentary film. During the expedition, his second son, Noboru, was born on May 10, 1935.

Upon returning from the voyage, Tsuburaya began work on Princess Kaguya, an adaptation of the 10th-century Japanese literary tale The Tale of the Bamboo Cutter. He did not only serve as the film's cinematographer, but was also in charge of special effects for the first time. For the film, he worked with animator Kenzō Masaoka to create miniatures, puppets, a composite of Kaguya emerging from a cut bamboo plant, and a sequence in which a ship encounters a storm. While the original print of the film is considered to be lost, a shortened version, screened in England in 1936, was discovered by a researcher at the British Film Institute in May 2015: this version was released in Japan on September 4 and 5, 2021, as part of an event celebrating Tsuburaya's 120th birthday.

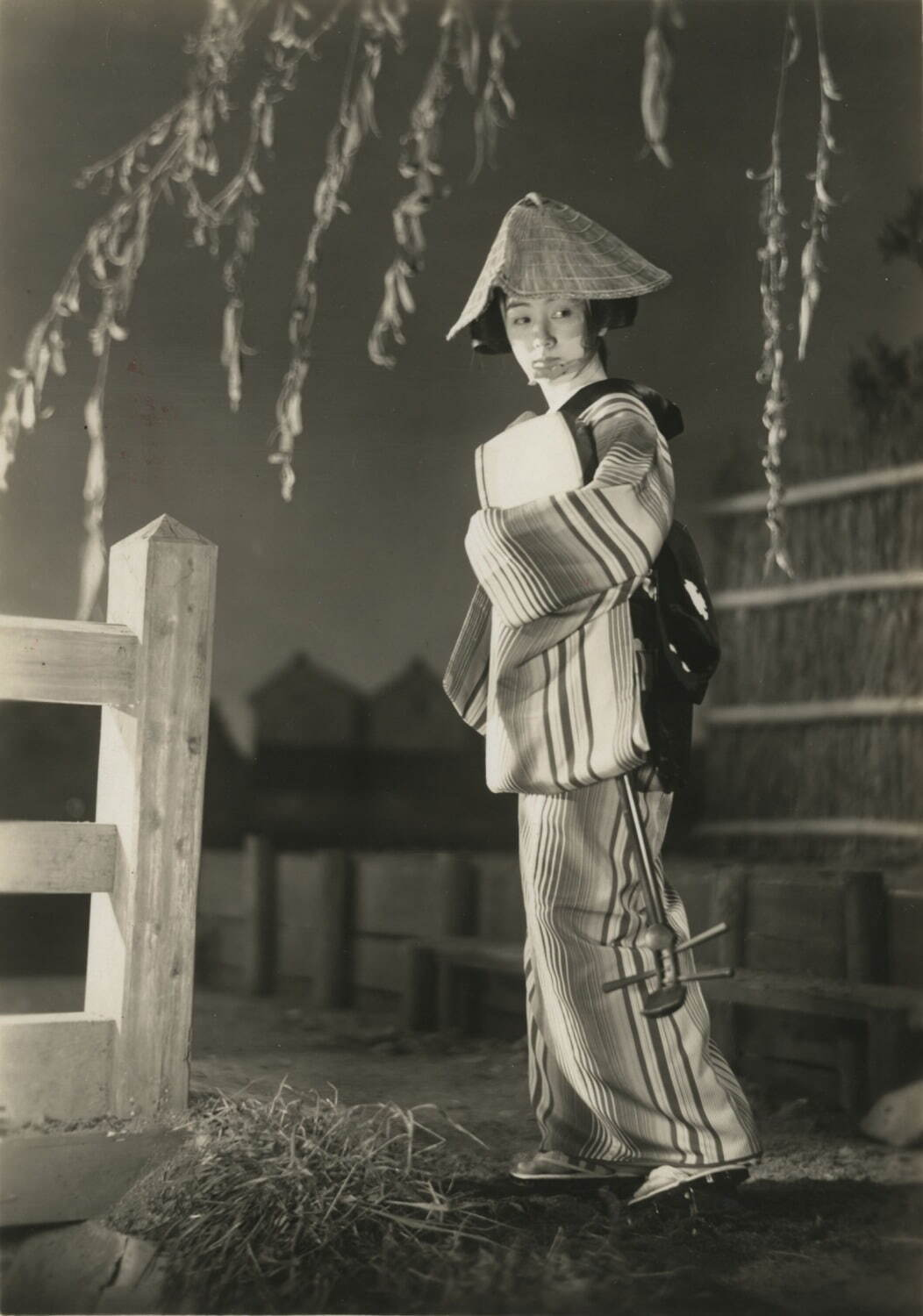
Publicity still of geisha singer Ichimaru playing the female lead in Tsuburaya's first histrionic film, Folk Song Collection: Oichi of Torioi Village.

In March of the next year, Tsuburaya's directorial debut, the theatrical play Folk Song Collection: Oichi of Torioi Village, was released: it was an adventure film concerning a condemned romance and featuring political tones. Folk Song Collection: Oichi of Torioi Village was the second film to ever star popular geisha singer Ichimaru, while also featuring actor Kenji Susukida. Soon after its completion, Tsuburaya began working on Arnold Fanck's The Daughter of the Samurai (released in 1937). The Daughter of the Samurai was the first German-Japanese co-production, and is considered to be Tsuburaya's first major success as a special effects director, since it featured the first full-scale rear projection. The German staff were allegedly impressed by his elaborate miniature work on the project.

In September 1936, Ichizō Kobayashi merged the film studios P.C.L. Studios and P.C.L. Film Company with J.O. Studios to create the film and theatre production company Toho. Film producer Iwao Mori was appointed as production manager at Toho: having become aware of the importance of special effects during a tour in Hollywood, in 1937 Mori hired Tsuburaya at the company's studio in Tokyo, establishing the special effects department on November 27, 1937, and treating him as the section's manager. Shortly after, Tsuburaya received a research budget and began studying optical printers to create Japan's first version of the device, which he designed. Among Tsuburaya's first film assignments at Toho were The Abe Clan, a jidaigeki film directed by Hisatora Kumagai, and the unreleased propaganda musical The Song of Major Nango (both 1938). The latter film was directed and shot by Tsuburaya, and he completed it on September 6 of that year.

In 1939, he was ordered to join the Kumagaya Aviation Academy of the Imperial Army Corps, where he was entrusted to shoot flight-training films. After impressing his superiors with his aerial photography, Tsuburaya was given more assignments and a master's certificate during his almost three years at the academy. In November 1939, while Tsuburaya was still at the flight school and undertaking assignments at Toho, he was appointed head of Toho's Special Arts Department. A month after that, he was commissioned to shoot a science film for Toho's then-recently assembled educational section. Under governance demands, Toho was mandated to maintain the creation of propaganda films. Accordingly, in May 1940, Tsuburaya began directing the documentary The Imperial Way of Japan for Toho Education Films' branch, the Toho National Policy Film Association. He was given his first ever credits for special effects for his work on Sotoji Kimura's Navy Bomber Squadron, which featured a bombing scene with a miniature airplane. Navy Bomber Squadron was believed to be lost for over sixty years, until an unfinished copy of the film was discovered and screened in 2006.

In September 1940, Yutaka Abe's The Burning Sky, was released to Japanese cinemas. Tsuburaya was in charge of effects for the film and received his first accolade from the Japan Motion Picture Cinematographers Association. His next undertaking, Son Gokū, was released on November 6, 1940. During an interview for the August 1960 issue of American Cinematographer, he broke down the creative process behind Son Gokū, saying: "I was called upon to create and photograph a monkey-like monster which was supposed to fly through the air", adding: "I managed the job with some success and this assignment set the pattern for my future work."

==== War years (1941–1945) ====
English subtitled print of The War at Sea from Hawaii to Malaya (1942), which featured an acclaimed depiction of the Pearl Harbor attack created by Tsuburaya

On December 7, 1941, the Imperial Japanese Navy Air Service suddenly attacked the U.S. naval base at Pearl Harbor: consequently, the Imperial Japanese Government tasked Toho to produce a propaganda film that would influence the nation to believe they would win the Pacific War. The resulting film, Kajirō Yamamoto's war epic The War at Sea from Hawaii to Malaya (1942), became the highest-grossing Japanese film in history upon its release in December 1942 and won Kinema Junpo's Best Film Award. Tsuburaya directed its effects, which he created with the assistance of navy-provided photographs of the Pearl Harbor attack: in the process, he also worked with future Godzilla collaborates Akira Watanabe and Teizō Toshimitsu for the first time in his career. His work on the film was supposedly one of the main reasons behind its major success and gained him the Technical Research Award from the Japan Motion Picture Cinematographers Association. (Note: Attributed to multiple references:) The film depicted the attack so realistically that footage from it was later featured in documentaries on the Pearl Harbor attack.

Around the same time as The War at Sea from Hawaii to Malaya was in production, Toho's effects department was filming Japan's first puppet film, Ramayana. The film's screenplay—based on the Sanskrit epic of the same name—had been written by future Moonlight Mask creator Kōhan Kawauchi in 1941, under Tsuburaya's supervision.

Tsuburaya's next four major productions were all war films: Masahiro Makino's The Opium War, Tadashi Imai's Watchtower Suicide Squad, Kunio Watanabe's Decisive Battle in the Skies and Kajirō Yamamoto's follow-up to The War at Sea from Hawaii to Malaya, General Kato's Falcon Fighters (all produced in 1943). For The Opium War, Tsuburaya and his team created miniature navy battle sequences and animation synthesis in urban landscapes. During the production of General Kato's Falcon Fighters (released in 1944), Tsuburaya had his first meeting with future collaborator and filmmaker Ishirō Honda. After watching The War at Sea from Hawaii to Malaya, Honda became interested in special effects and believed Tsuburaya's work in General Kato's Falcon Fighters was inferior in scope, but the art and gunpowder technology had enhanced. Additionally, Tsuburaya expressed dissatisfaction with the size of the shooting stage, the art materials, the method of performance, etc.

Shortly before Toho distributed General Kato's Falcon Fighters in cinemas, Masano and Tsuburaya's third son and last child, Akira, was born on February 12, 1944. Akira was the first of the couple's sons to be baptized, since Masano had been converted to Catholicism by her younger sister. Masano persisted in introducing her children to the Catholic faith and ultimately converted her husband.

In 1944, Tsuburaya met future Godzilla producer Tomoyuki Tanaka during the production of the Mikio Naruse-directed war film Until the Day of Victory, which was Tanaka's debut as a film producer. Tanaka stated that he did not develop a serious connection with Tsuburaya during the film's production. The following year, the special effects director collaborated with Tanaka for the second time on Kiyoshi Saeki's Three People of the North.

On March 10, 1945, Tsuburaya and his family sought refuge for two hours in their residence's bomb shelter during the Tokyo air raids. During the two-hour-long attacks, he told his children fairy tales to keep them quiet. Later that year, Tsuburaya made the effects in Torajirō Saitō's Five Men from Tokyo, for which he was credited as "Eiichi Tsuburaya". Five Men from Tokyo is a comedy film concerning five men who struggle to make a living after returning to Tokyo and remaining unemployed due to the Tokyo air raids on March 10, 1945, at the end of World War II.

=== Occupation years to Chūshingura: 1946–1962 ===
==== Early postwar work (1946–1954) ====
Even though Toho was unaffected by the Tokyo bombings, as the company was located in Seijo, the amount of film productions was reduced due to the Occupation of Japan. Because of this, the company produced only eighteen films in 1946, with Tsuburaya working on eight of them. During the same year, Tsuburaya became head of the special effects production department at Toho and established its cinematography, compositing, art, and development units. Since he and his effects unit at the company had a minor slate of films to work on, they also began testing matte painting and optical printing.

Toho was on the verge of disbandment due to the three major labor disputes that occurred at the studio during the late 1940s. According to Akira Tsuburaya, his father had to sneak around the Japanese police and U.S. tanks deployed during these strikes and disputes in order to get to work. To repel the police, the labor strikers erected a barricade, using a large fan, made by the special effects department of the company, which was equipped with the Zero fighter engine that Tsuburaya had used during the war. These events led to the creation of Shintoho; Tsuburaya would create the effects for the studio's first film, A Thousand and One Nights with Toho (1947).

In late March 1948, Tsuburaya was purged from Toho by the Supreme Commander for the Allied Powers because of his involvement in propaganda films during World War II. The U.S. occupation officials reportedly expelled him assuming he had access to classified documents when creating the comprehensive miniatures featured in The War at Sea from Hawaii to Malaya, which led them to inaccurately conclude that he was a spy. (Note: Attributed to multiple references:) Consequently, Toho disbanded their special effects division and Tsuburaya, together with his son Hajime, founded the independent special effects company Tsuburaya Special Technology Laboratory, (Note: Attributed to multiple references:) an unofficial juridical entity. Henceforth, he worked at major film studios outside Toho without on-screen credit.

Tsuburaya's effects in The Invisible Man Appears (1949) were intended to be superior to those in Universal's The Invisible Man film series

In 1949, five major Daiei Film productions featuring effects directed by Tsuburaya were released to Japanese theaters: Japanese horror filmmaker Bin Kato's The White Haired Fiend, Keigo Kimura's Flowers of Raccoon Palace, Kiyohiko Ushihara's The Rainbow Man, Akira Nobuchi's The Ghost Train, and Nobuo Adachi's The Invisible Man Appears. This last movie was the first successful Japanese science fiction film, as well as the country's first adaption of H. G. Wells' novel The Invisible Man. Created by studying the eponymous 1933 film adaptation of Wells' novel, Daiei had intended this film to be Tsuburaya's full-scale post-war recovery, featuring special effects superior in quality to those in Universal Pictures' The Invisible Man film series. Tsuburaya, however, was disappointed with his lack of competence on the project and gave up his ambition to become a Daiei employee after The Invisible Man Appears was finished. (Note: Attributed to multiple references:)

In 1950, Tsuburaya relocated some equipment and employees at Tsuburaya Special Technology Laboratory to Toho's headquarters; his independent company was merely the size of six tatami mats inside Toho Studios. In the same year, he continued to direct special effects for films from other companies, including Toyoko Eiga's anti-war film Listen to the Voices of the Sea. While slowly rebuilding the company's Special Arts Department, he filmed all of the title cards, trailers, and the logo for Toho's films from 1950 to 1954. The first production featuring major contributions by Tsuburaya upon his return to Toho was reportedly a 1950 film directed by Hiroshi Inagaki and based on the life of Japanese swordsman Sasaki Kojirō. During this period, Tsuburaya also worked on Toho films such as Senkichi Taniguchi's anti-war film Escape at Dawn (1950), directed the effects for Taniguchi's Beyond Love and Hate, staged miniature ships to depict a battle in Hiroshi Inagaki's Pirate Ship, and directed the effects for Kenji Mizoguchi's The Lady of Musashino.

In February 1952, Tsuburaya's exile from public office was officially lifted. That same month, Ishirō Honda's second feature film, The Skin of the South, was released to Japanese theaters. Tsuburaya directed the film's effects for the typhoon and landslide scenes, which was his first experience acting as the effects director on a film by the future Godzilla director. Tsuburaya collaborated with Honda and producer Tomoyuki Tanaka on The Man Who Came to Port later that year: this marked the first time the trio, who are considered the creators of Godzilla, ever collaborated with one another.

During World War II, Toho had begun researching 3D films and completed a 3D film process known as "Tovision". While the project had been abandoned, it was later revived when the 3D film Bwana Devil (1952) became a box office hit in the United States. Hence, the company produced its first 3D film, future Godzilla co-writer Takeo Murata's The Sunday That Jumped Out (1953). It features cinematography by Tsuburaya, who shot the short film by using an interlocking camera. After the completion of The Sunday That Jumped Out, Murata discussed creating a kaiju film about a giant whale attacking Tokyo, which Tsuburaya devised the previous year. Tsuburaya, therefore, resubmitted the conception of this production to producer Iwao Mori. Although this project never materialized, elements of it were included in early drafts of Godzilla the following year.

Tsuburaya's next project, the war epic Eagle of the Pacific (1953), was his first significant partnership with Ishirō Honda. As the film featured many effects sequences from The War at Sea from Hawaii to Malaya, Tsuburaya used only a small crew to shoot its new effects. Upon its release, the film reportedly became Toho's first post-war production to gross over ¥100 million ($278,000). The ensuing year, he and Honda collaborated on another war film, Farewell Rabaul, released to Japanese theaters in February 1954, to moderate box office success. His effects for this assignment were more advanced than the ones used for Eagle of the Pacific, since they featured many more of his technological approaches and syntheses. Because of the success of Eagle of the Pacific and Farewell Rabaul, Tomoyuki Tanaka believed Tsuburaya should make more tokusatsu films with Honda. Tsuburaya's next film would become Japan's first global hit and gain him international attention.

==== International recognition (1954–1959) ====
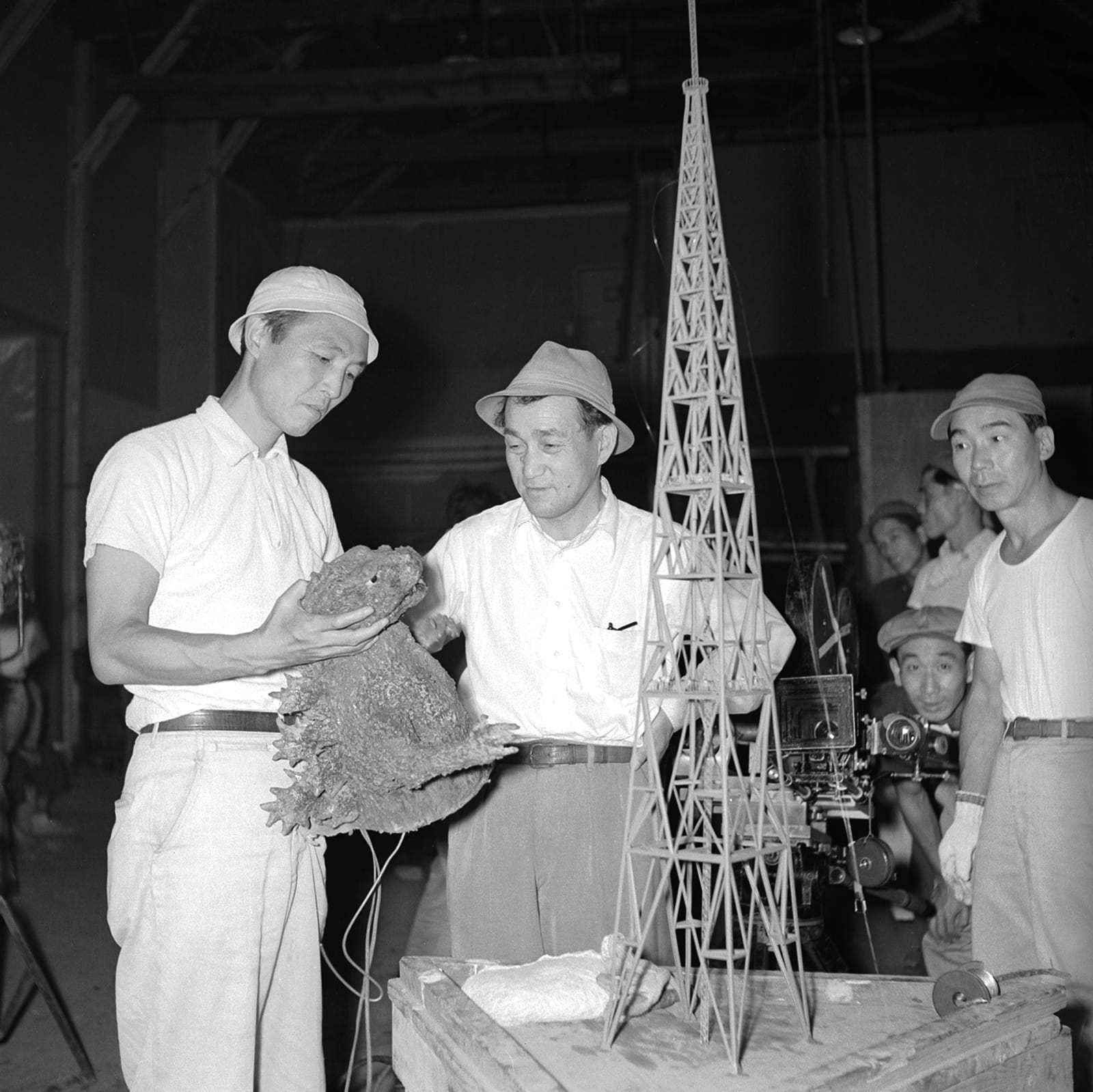
Tsuburaya (center) with director Ishirō Honda (left) on the set of Godzilla (1954)

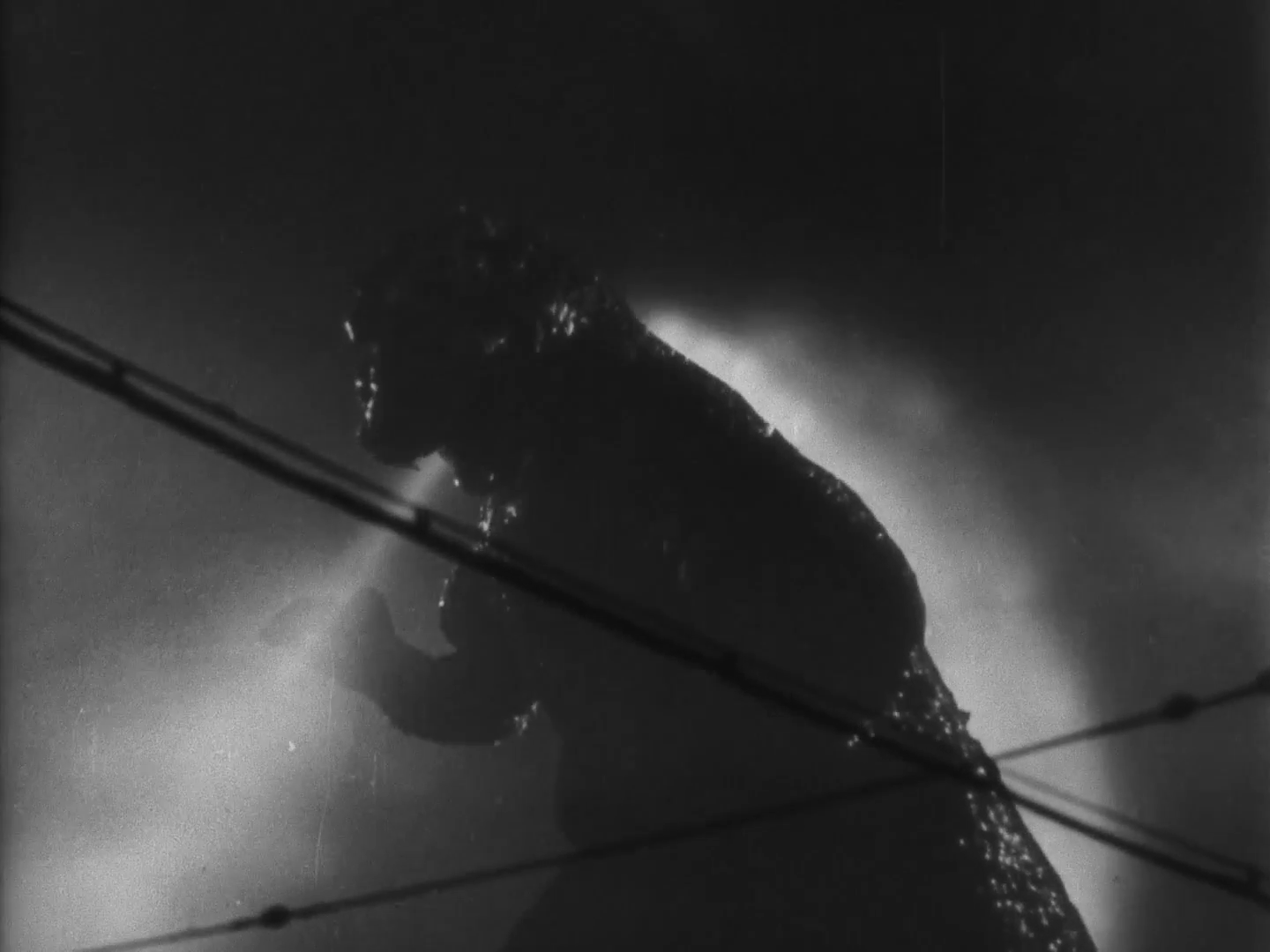
The debut appearance of Godzilla, in the self-titled 1954 film

After failing to renegotiate with the Indonesian government for the production of In the Shadow of Glory, producer Tomoyuki Tanaka began to consider creating a giant monster (or kaiju) film, inspired by Eugène Lourié's The Beast from 20,000 Fathoms (1953) and the Daigo Fukuryū Maru incident. He believed that it would have considerable potential, due to the financial success of previous monster films and the impact of news generating nuclear fears. As a result, he wrote an outline for the project and pitched it to Iwao Mori. Following Tsuburaya's agreement to create its effects, Mori approved the production, eventually titled Godzilla, in mid-April 1954; filmmaker Ishirō Honda soon took over the directing duties. During preproduction, Tsuburaya considered using stop motion to depict the titular monster but, as stated by special effects crew member Fumio Nakadai, had to employ the "costume method" because he "finally decided it wouldn't work". This technique is now known as "suitmation".

Tsuburaya's special effects department filmed Godzilla in 71 days from August to late October 1954, on a budget of ¥27 million. He and his crew worked relentlessly, regularly starting at 9:00 a.m., preparing at 5:00 p.m., and finishing the shoot at 4 or 5 a.m. in the following morning. Upon its nationwide release on November 3, Tsuburaya's effects received critical acclaim and the film became a box office hit. As a result, Godzilla established Toho as the most successful effects company in the world, and Tsuburaya obtained his first Japan Technical Award for his efforts.

Instantly after completing Godzilla in October, Tsuburaya began working on another Toho-produced science fiction film, The Invisible Avenger, which was released to Japanese theaters in December 1954, under the title Invisible Man. This tokusatsu production was directed by Motoyoshi Oda and featured special effects and photography by Tsuburaya. For the movie, he inherited and expanded the technology used in his first film to feature an invisible character, The Invisible Man Appears (1949). Tsuburaya instructed his crew to portray the title character's invisibility in various ways throughout the film, including optical synthesis, and suggested that the character would disguise his invisibility powers by dressing up as a clown.

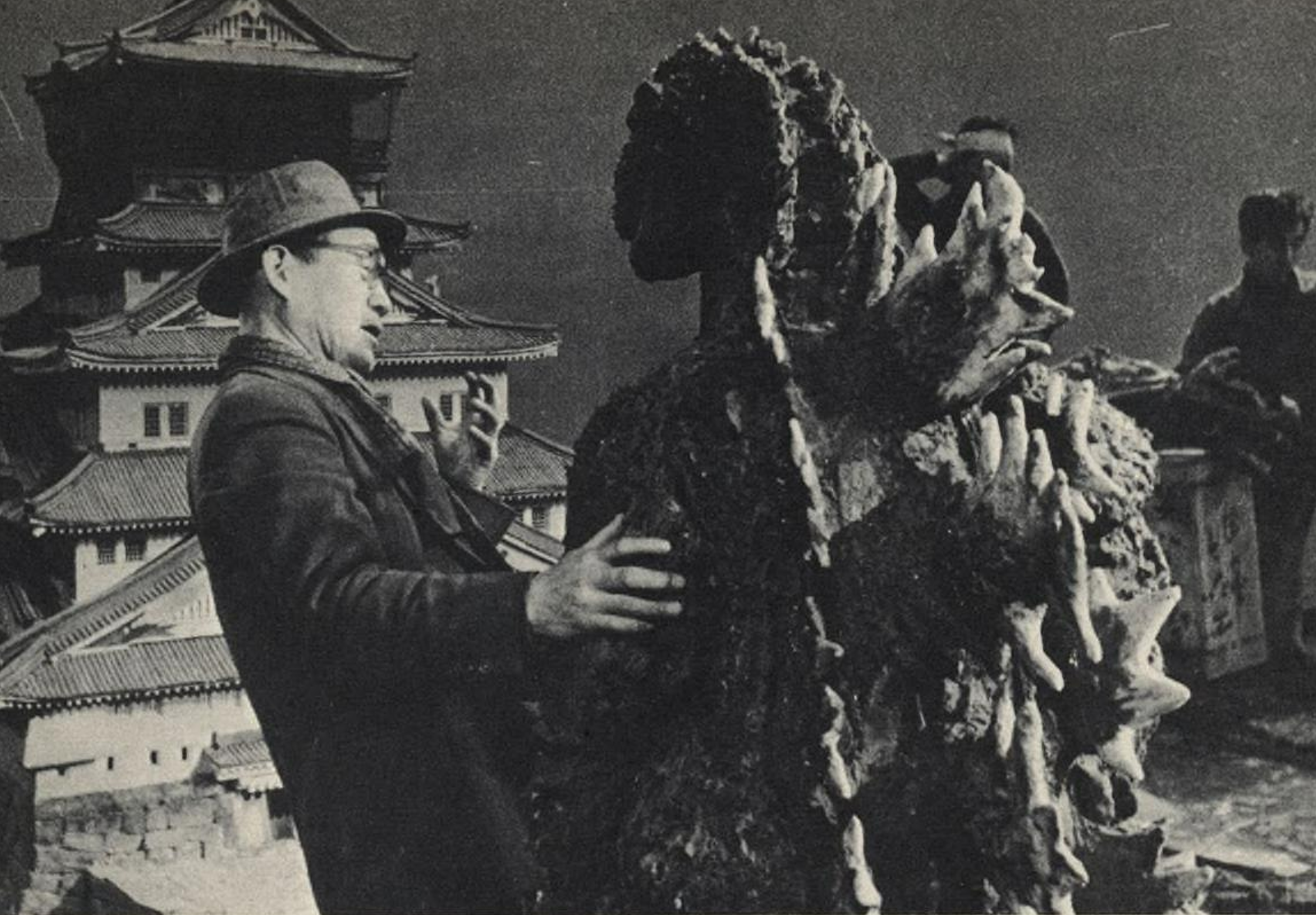
Tsuburaya instructs Godzilla suit actor Haruo Nakajima on the set of Godzilla Raids Again (1955)

Due to the enormous box-office success of Godzilla, Toho quickly gathered the majority of the crew behind the film to create a smaller-budget sequel to the film, entitled Godzilla Raids Again: Tsuburaya was officially given the title of special effects director for the first time, having always been credited under "special technique" beforehand. Shot in less than three months, the film was released in April 1955. Just a month later, Tsuburaya began directing the effects of Half Human, his second kaiju film collaboration with director Ishirō Honda. Among his efforts on this film, the effects director notably created stop-motion animation, rear-screen miniature, and miniature avalanche sequences.

In April 1956, Godzilla became the first Japanese film to be widely distributed throughout the United States and was later released worldwide, leading Tsuburaya to gain international recognition. However, for its American release, the movie was re-entitled as Godzilla, King of the Monsters!, heavily re-edited, and integrated with new footage featuring Canadian actor Raymond Burr.

Tsuburaya's next major undertaking, The Legend of the White Serpent, a Hong Kong-Japanese film adaptation of a novel by Fusao Hayashi based on the Chinese legend of the White Snake, was Toho's first tokusatsu production to be completely filmed in technicolor (via Eastmancolor). (Note: Attributed to multiple references:) In preparation for the film, which was produced on a then-record budget of ¥210 million, Tsuburaya and his unit spent a month training with color process technology before shooting the effects. After working on The Legend of the White Serpent, Tsuburaya made the renowned Toho logo, and his unit created the opening credits for most of the company's films. Between working on large-scale Toho films, he also created the effects for Nippon TV's series Ninja Arts of Sanada Castle and several theatrical productions for Tokyo Takarazuka Theater.

Toho's next assignment for Tsuburaya was Rodan, the first kaiju film ever produced in color. About 60% of Rodan's ¥200 million budget was spent on Tsuburaya's effects, which included optical animation, matte paintings, and extremely elaborate miniature sets created to be destroyed or flown over by its namesake monster (played by original Godzilla suit actor Haruo Nakajima). Rodan required a large number of model sets in a variety of sizes, including 1/10, 1/20, 1/25, and 1/30, to be developed and assembled by Tsuburaya's division. The film premiered in Japanese theaters in December 1956 and, upon its release in the United States the following year, earned more at the box office than any previous science fiction film.

Throne of Blood, an adaptation of William Shakespeare's Macbeth from renowned filmmaker Akira Kurosawa, was Tsuburaya's second film release of 1957. Kurosawa cut several scenes by Tsuburaya due to his displeasure with the amount of footage he made for Throne of Blood. He next served as the special effects director for The Mysterians, a science fiction epic directed by Ishirō Honda. The first color CinemaScope film ever directed by the duo, The Mysterians is often called the "definitive science fiction movie". Tsuburaya won another Japan Technical Award for his widescreen effects in The Mysterians.

A new sub-genre for Toho was born with Tsuburaya's first movie of 1958, The H-Man, which was the first entry in the "Transforming Human Series". He next directed the effects for Honda's Varan the Unbelievable, a film about a giant monster awakened in the Tōhoku mountains that surfaces in Tokyo Bay. Initially planned as a made-for-television film, co-produced between Toho and the American company AB-PT Pictures, the production was plagued by numerous difficulties: AB-PT collapsed during production, leading Toho to alter the film's status to a theatrical feature. Tsuburaya's final film released in 1958 was Kurosawa's The Hidden Fortress.

Tsuburaya began 1959 by working on the special effects for Mighty Atom, a tokusatsu television series based on Osamu Tezuka's manga series Astro Boy. Although neither he nor his company were credited in the show itself when it aired between March 7, 1959, and May 28, 1960, he supervised the miniature photography done by his staff at Tsuburaya Special Technology Laboratory. Around the same time, Tsuburaya also directed the special effects for a storm sequence featured in Honda's Inao: Story of an Iron Arm, for which he also constructed the miniature for the title character's rowboat. Next, he worked on Monkey Sun, co-written and directed by Kajirō Yamamoto as an all-star remake of his 1940 film Son Gokū, a previous entry in the effects director's curriculum. Taking inspiration from watching soybean paste in the broth of his wife's miso soup, Tsuburaya created scenes with storm clouds, as well as smoke and ash erupting from three volcanoes. His effects for Monkey Sun were described by biographer August Ragone as "comical and surreal".

After operating on the Tokyo Takarazuka Theater production The Story of Bali, he directed the effects for Shūe Matsubayashi's Submarine I-57 Will Not Surrender, his first war film in six years. In order to film submarine scenes for the film, a model seabed terrain was built in the first Toho miniature pool (dubbed the "Small Pool" after a bigger stage was completed). He also filmed his effects for a technicolor version of the film, but they were converted to black-and-white for the final version. In August 1959, Tsuburaya, together with his sons Hajime and Noboru, shot footage of two dragon puppets in Tsuburaya's laboratory at their house in Setagaya, Tokyo for a Hong Kong-based film company.

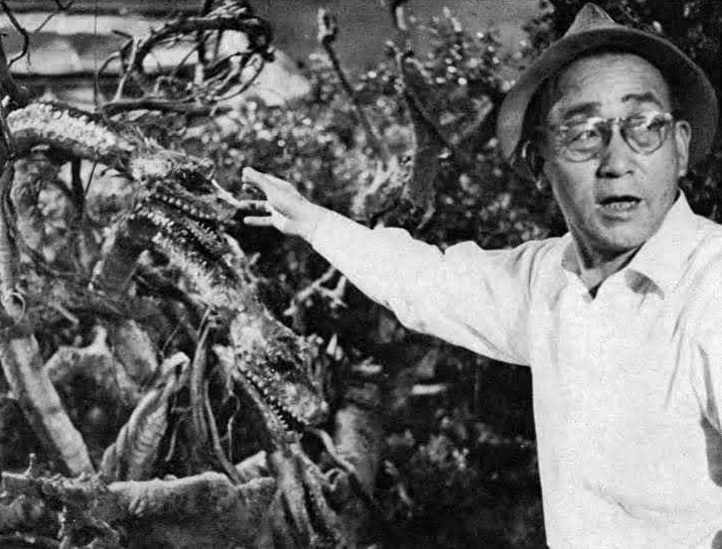
Tsuburaya with the Yamata no Orochi prop on the set of The Three Treasures (1959)

Tsuburaya's following significant production, director Hiroshi Inagaki's big-budget religious epic The Three Treasures, was created as Toho's celebratory thousandth film. (Note: Attributed to multiple references:) Based on legends featured in the Kojiki and Nihon Shoki, it stars Toshiro Mifune as Yamato Takeru and the kami Susanoo. The effects director and his crew shot several key sequences included in the film, such as a battle between Mifune's character Susanoo and the eight-headed dragon Yamata no Orochi and an eruption of Mount Fuji. On The Three Treasures, Tsuburaya used for the first time the "Toho Versatile Process", an adaptation of Toho's optical printing process that he developed on a budget of ¥62 million for widescreen color films and revealed in May of the same year. The movie earned over ¥340 million, against an initial ¥250 million budget, ranking as Toho's highest-grossing film of the year and their second-highest-grossing film altogether. He won the Japan Technical Award for Special Skill and was presented with the Special Achievement Award at Movie Day. While he was pleased with the success of The Three Treasures, Tsuburaya became disappointed after seeing a picture of the heads of the Yamata no Orochi prop held up by piano wires in a newspaper article concerning its special effects. Accordingly, he declined an interview with the newspaper because he believed the photograph "broke children's dreams".

When the Space Race erupted between the U.S. and the Soviet Union in the late 1950s, Tsuburaya counseled Toho to produce a film about a lunar expedition. Therefore, his next film, Battle in Outer Space, was a science fiction epic about a group of astronauts who battle extraterrestrials on the surface of the Moon. (Note: Tsuburaya was reportedly particularly pleased with his depiction of the Moon in Battle in Outer Space after watching Apollo 11.) Tsuburaya reportedly paid homage to producer George Pal's Destination Moon (1950) in the film's Moon landing sequence; he would later meet Pal in Los Angeles in 1962. Since films featuring his contributions were attaining global popularity and praise for Japanese cinema, Hearst filmed Tsuburaya directing the effects for Battle in Outer Space, and he later received the Special Award of Merit at the fourth Movie Day ceremony prior to its release.

==== From The Secret of the Telegian to Chūshingura (1960–1962) ====
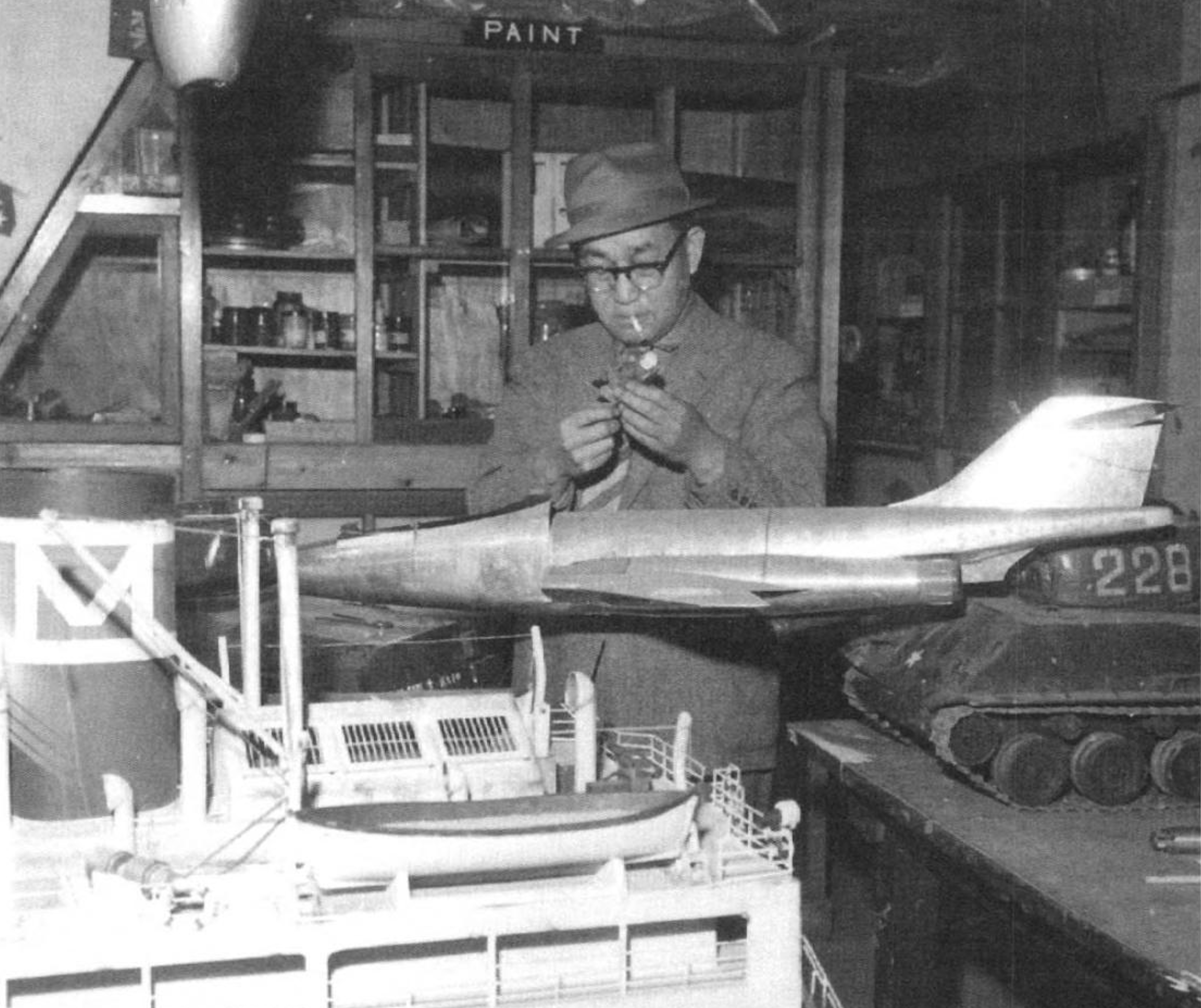
Tsuburaya holding a miniature pilot's ejector seat, c. 1961

A smaller-scale science fiction film, entitled The Secret of the Telegian, which was Toho's second installment in the Transforming Human Series, marked Tsuburaya's first assignment of 1960. He then took on a project of a much larger extent, Storm Over the Pacific, the first-ever war film in color. His department created notably large miniatures for the film, with a 13-meter long miniature being filmed by Tsuburaya on the Miura Coast. Storm Over the Pacific was also Toho's first film to require the use of the "Big Pool", which had been completed in February 1960. The pool would later be used in the production of every Godzilla film, before being demolished at the end of the filming process for Godzilla: Final Wars (2004). Storm Over the Pacific obtained critical acclaim upon its release, with numerous of Tsuburaya's effects sequences being later featured in Midway (1976), a film by Jack Smight that was also about the Pacific War. Throughout the rest of 1960, Tsuburaya worked on other notable productions, such as the third film in the Transforming Human Series, The Human Vapor; he also oversaw the creation of an extremely detailed miniature of Osaka Castle and directed its destruction scene for Hiroshi Inagaki's jidaigeki film The Story of Osaka Castle, and then directed the tsunami sequence in the film adaptation of Pearl S. Buck's 1948 novel The Big Wave.

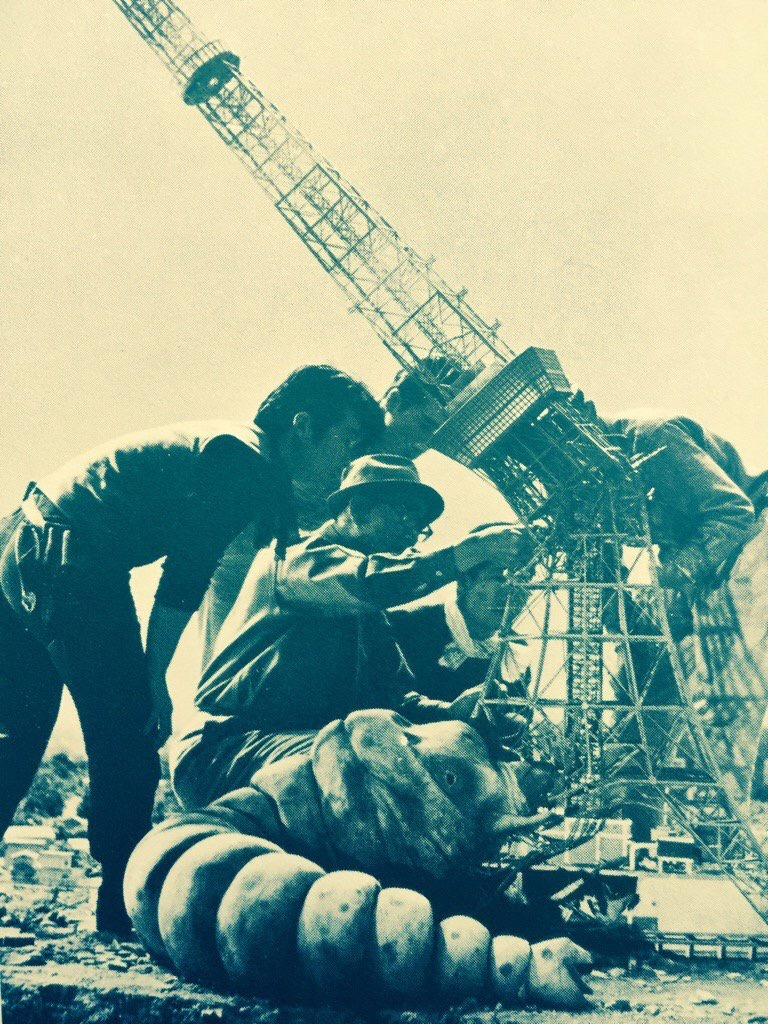
Tsuburaya and the special effects crew preparing the miniature Tokyo Tower for Mothra's attack scene in Mothra (1961)

In 1961, Tsuburaya directed the effects for Mothra, another kaiju film created in collaboration with Ishirō Honda. Allegedly inspired by his own dreams, Tsuburaya created the eponymous giant, moth-like kaiju, which would go on to become one of the icons of Japanese fantasy cinema, alongside Godzilla and Rodan, and appear in numerous films thereafter. Though the overall budget for Mothra allowed the effects department to create the largest-scale miniature set ever constructed for a Toho production, Tsuburaya was displeased with some of the sequences shot for the film, including some composite cuts of the Shobijin. Nonetheless, he decided to keep these scenes upon editing Mothra in post-production. The film was released on July 30, 1961, becoming a massive box office hit and, as stated by biographer August Ragone, an "instant classic" alongside Honda and Tsuburaya's earlier kaiju films Godzilla and Rodan.

After directing blue screen dream scenes with actor Toshiro Mifune for Hiroshi Inagaki's film The Youth and His Amulet (1961), (Note: Attributed to multiple references:) Tsuburaya moved on to direct the effects for Shūe Matsubayashi's ¥300 million epic tokusatsu film The Last War, which emerged as a major hit upon its October 1961 release, with Tsuburaya's effects receiving critical acclaim. The effects director himself would later list The Last War as one of his "masterpieces". Producer Tomoyuki Tanaka, assured from the box office success of Mothra and The Last War, gave Honda and Tsuburaya their greatest budget yet and 300 days to shoot Gorath, their next science fiction epic. Although Gorath is considered to feature some of Tsuburaya's best work as a special effects director, it was a box office failure when it was released in March 1962. On May 15, the director appeared on NK Educational TV's program Japanese Standards; in July, he finished directing the effects for The Story of Shim Cheong, a South Korean-produced film that was never released in Japan.

My movie company came up with a very interesting script that combined King Kong and Godzilla, so I couldn't help working on this production, instead of my new fantasy films. This script is very special to me; it struck a deep emotional chord, because it was seeing King Kong back in 1933 that sparked my interest in the world of special visual effects.

— Eiji Tsuburaya (1962)

After filming Gorath, Tsuburaya began planning to work on other projects, such as a new version of Princess Kaguya. However, he postponed those as soon as he was given the opportunity to direct the special effects for Honda's crossover film King Kong vs. Godzilla. The script's early drafts were sent back with notes from Toho asking for the monster antics to be as "funny as possible"; Tsuburaya embraced this approach, seeking to emotionally appeal to children and expand the genre's audience. Many of the sequences for the battle between the two monsters were purposefully filled with humorous details, but the approach was not favored by most of the effects crew, who "couldn't believe" some of the things Tsuburaya asked them to do, such as Kong and Godzilla volleying a giant boulder back and forth. For their portrayals, Tsuburaya gave Haruo Nakajima (playing Godzilla) and Shoichi Hirose (playing King Kong) freedom to choreograph their own moves. Tsuburaya directed sequences at a miniature outdoor set on the Miura Coast, which depicted the giant octopus's attack on the Faro Island village. (Note: Attributed to multiple references:) During its original theatrical release in August 1962, King Kong vs. Godzilla became the second-highest-grossing Japanese film in history and was watched by 11.2 million people, leading it to be regarded as the most-attended film in the Godzilla series.

Tsuburaya's final film release of 1962 was Inagaki's epic jidaigeki film Chūshingura: Hana no Maki, Yuki no Maki, for which he and his department made forced perspective stages and various optical effects. Produced by Toho—like King Kong vs. Godzilla—in celebration of their 30th anniversary, Chūshingura was the company's fourth highest-grossing film of the year, and their tenth-highest altogether.

=== Birth of a company to last years: 1963–1970 ===
==== Birth of a company and career expansion (1963–1964) ====
The first movie released in 1963 to feature Tsuburaya's contributions was another war film by Shūe Matsubayashi, Attack Squadron!, distributed in January of that year. Despite not being an epic film, unlike Toho's previous war movies, Attack Squadron! still featured several miniature Japanese and American aircraft, crafted by Tsuburaya's crew, with some of the models being controlled via radio control. The sole new miniature battleship built for the film was Yamato, an enormous motorized model constructed at 1/15 scale and measuring 17.5 meters (or 57.5 feet).

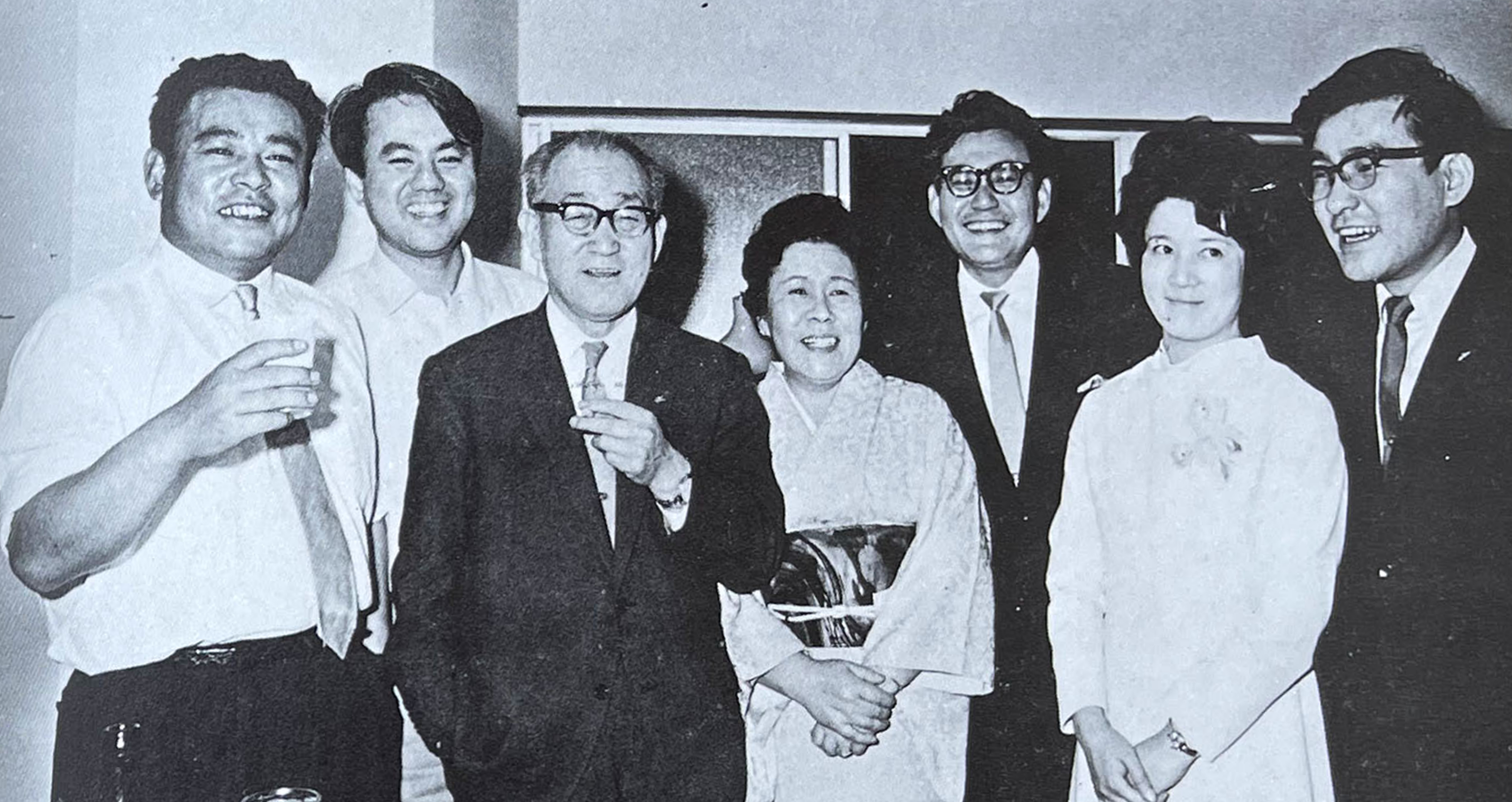
The Tsuburaya family and employee Tetsuo Kinjō celebrating the foundation of Tsuburaya Productions. Left to right: Hajime, Kinjō, Eiji, Masano, Noboru, Tomoko (Noboru's spouse), and Akira.

After visiting Hollywood in order to study the special effects work of major American studios, Tsuburaya founded his own independent company, Tsuburaya Special Effects Productions (later called simply Tsuburaya Productions), on April 12, 1963. It was initially handled entirely by his family: Tsuburaya was reported as its director general and president; his wife Masano was on the director's board; his second son Noboru was appointed as accountant. Hajime, Tsuburaya's eldest son, would soon join the company as well, leaving his award-winning directorial employment at the Tokyo Broadcasting System. Around August of the same year, photography assistant Kiyoshi Suzuki was hired alongside Koichi Takano, a former news cameraman for Kyodo Television. Takano was directly involved in Tsuburaya Productions' first-ever full-scale tokusatsu production, Alone Across the Pacific (1963), which required twenty-five effects sequences. Throughout the rest of the year, Tsuburaya worked both for his new company and Toho, where he was still at the helm of the effects department, despite having terminated his exclusive deal with the company.

The second film released in 1963 to feature his contributions was Li Han-hsiang's Hong Kong musical film The Love Eterne. The effects director was tasked to stage the scene where an earthquake split the tomb of the character Liang Shanbo (played by Ivy Ling Po) in two and the protagonist (played by Betty Loh Ti) ascended into heaven. Cinematographer Tadashi Nishimoto traveled to Japan in order to film Tsuburaya's effects at Shintoho's second studio. Thereafter, the special effects director moved on to the World War I adventure film The Siege of Fort Bismarck. In his first partnership with director Kengo Furusawa, Tsuburaya's division developed several new models for the film, including large-scale miniatures, full-scale replications of early twentieth-century flying vehicles, and an enormous outdoor model set of Fort Bismarck. According to Ragone, Tsuburaya enjoyed working on this film, despite aiming to make his own tribute feature to Japanese aviation pioneers.

Shortly after completing The Siege of Fort Bismarck in April 1963, he began pre-production work on Matango, another film created in cooperation with Ishirō Honda, which was the final entry in the Transforming Human Series. In contrast with the majority of Toho's previous monster-themed films, the actors were capable of psychical interaction with the suit actors portraying the monsters on a sound stage. Sadao Iizuka said that Tsuburaya "focused" Toho to purchase the "Optical Printer 1900 Series" in order to facilitate the production of special effects, while noting that optical synthesis technology became popular following the film's release. A box office failure upon its Japanese release, Matango was not included in Kinema Junpo's list of height-grossing films for the year, and has been considered as one of Honda and Tsuburaya's most obscure movies ever since, being deemed as a "virtually unknown film".

Tsuburaya soon moved on to film miniatures and produce optical animation (via his newly purchased Optical Printer 1900 Series) for The Lost World of Sinbad. This film, directed by Senkichi Taniguchi from a screenplay by Mothra and King Kong vs. Godzilla writer Shinichi Sekizawa, included an acclaimed choreographed chase sequence between a wizard and a witch, created via animation and matte photography, which gained Tsuburaya another Japan Technical Award for Special Skill.

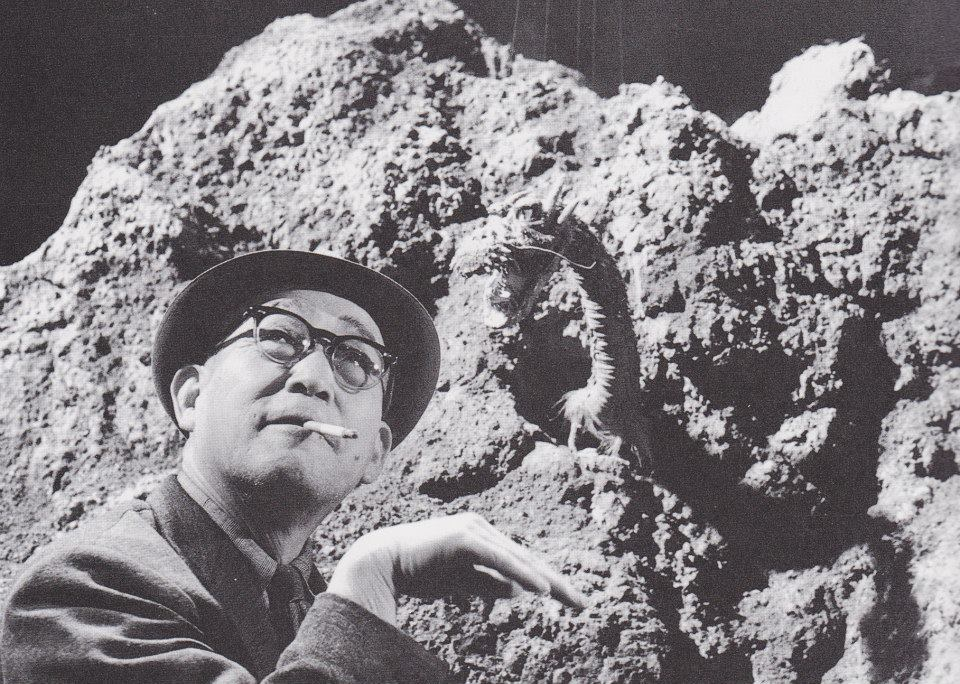
Tsuburaya with a prop used to portray the Mu empire's guardian sea dragon Manda on the set of Atragon, 1963

Tsuburaya almost immediately started to work on another Honda-directed science fiction tokusatsu movie, Atragon (1963). Based on Shunrō Oshikawa's novel The Undersea Warship (Note: Attributed to multiple references:) and incorporated with Shigeru Komatsuzaki's novel Undersea Empire, the film concerns a group of former colleagues, friends, and family that must convince the captain of the battleship Gotengo, Hachiro Jinguji (played by Jun Tazaki), to use his battleship to save the world from the invading ancient undersea civilization of Mu, who are using their advanced technology and their guardian sea dragon, Manda, in an attempt to take over the surface world. Since Toho aimed to distribute the film in Japanese theaters on December 22 of that year, Tsuburaya was given roughly two months to shoot the effects sequences for Atragon. As a result, in order to achieve the company's goal, he separated his special effects team into two units, assuring that it would allow him to complete the assignment as soon as possible. Although it was quickly converted and developed, the film is regarded as "one of the cornerstones of Japanese cinema" and is still often referenced in media.

While working on Atragon, Tsuburaya was also concluding model effects for the Hiroshi Inagaki-directed jidaigeki film, Whirlwind (1964). During this period of time, lack of sleep and workload-related stress were taking a toll on Tsuburaya's health, so much that he was often found sleeping in his chair during scene set-ups for his effects shoots.

The fourth installment in the Godzilla movie series, Mothra vs. Godzilla (1964), was Tsuburaya's next project. Often regarded as the best kaiju film to feature his works, it was produced in celebration of the tenth-anniversary of Toho's kaiju films and depicts the battle between Godzilla and the title character of the 1961 film Mothra. Tsuburaya utilized his 1900 optical printer to remove damage in composite photographs for the picture and create Godzilla's atomic breath; he also went on location to shoot some composite plates of Nagoya Castle for the scene where Godzilla destroyed the building. Since Godzilla actor Haruo Nakajima could not destroy the castle's model entirely, as originally planned, Tsuburaya first attempted to salvage the shot by making Godzilla seem enraged by the castle's strong fortification, before eventually choosing to re-shoot the scene with a more fragile model. He also went on location to shoot a segment featuring the United States Navy discharging missiles at Godzilla: this scene was included in the movie's version for the U.S. market, whereas it was omitted from the original Japanese version. This was one of the rare occasions when a sequence featuring Godzilla was shot outside Toho Studios.

==== Japanese-American coproductions and Ultra Q (1964–1965) ====
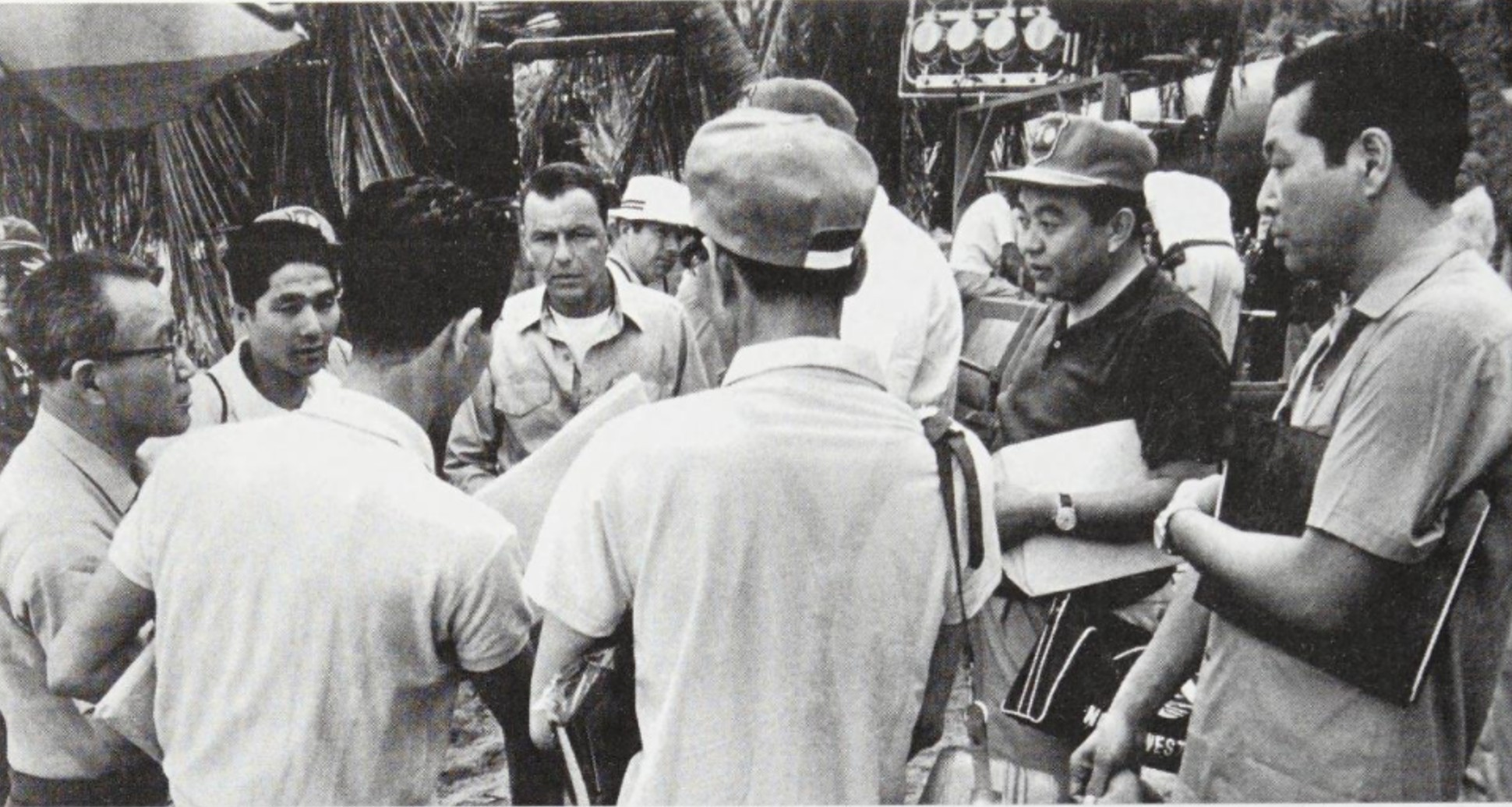
Tsuburaya (far left, with glasses) talks with Frank Sinatra (center) during the filming of the dogfight scene in None but the Brave (1965)

In the spring of 1964, Tsuburaya received a visit from frequent collaborator Ishirō Honda on the Hawaiian Island of Kauai. The effects director was shooting a dogfight and plane crash sequence for Frank Sinatra's None but the Brave (released in 1965), the renowned singer and actor's sole directorial picture. As the first major Japanese-American co-production, the epic anti-war film revolved around a troop of American soldiers, stranded in the middle of the Pacific Ocean during World War II, who are forced to collaborate with an opposition Japanese unit that has also been stranded on the same island. During Honda's visit, Tsuburaya told him he was working on his first television series for Tsuburaya Productions, then-titled Unbalance, but was struggling to find a lead actor for it. Honda convinced Kenji Sahara (who starred in None but the Brave and several Honda-Tsuburaya kaiju films) to play the team leader for the intended show, which would later become Ultra Q (1966). None but the Brave was later released in Japan by Toho on January 15, 1965, and was distributed by Warner Bros. in the U.S. the following month.

In January 1964, while in New York, Tsuburaya ordered Oxberry's 1200 optical printer, a model that at the time was owned by only one other studio in the entire world: Disney. Despite having to spend a then-record ¥40 million fee, Tsuburaya wanted to purchase the new printer for Tsuburaya Productions because it was one of the most adaptable post-production tools: moreover, he had used Oxberry's previous iteration of the device on films such as Matango. He went on to operate this technology on Ultra Q, Tsuburaya Productions' first television series, which was a combination of two of his previously discarded projects, tentatively titled Unbalance and WoO. Principal photography on Ultra Q began on September 27, 1964, with the shooting of the episode "Mammoth Flower". Airing on the Tokyo Broadcasting System from January 2 to July 3, 1966, the series follows the adventures of a trio who investigates strange phenomena, ranging from supernatural threats to kaiju, in the 20th century. Upon broadcast, around 30% of Japanese households with televisions watched the show, making Tsuburaya a household name and gaining him even more attention from the media, who dubbed him the "God of Tokusatsu".

After directing the effects on Honda's kaiju film Dogora (released in August 1964), Tsuburaya renewed their collaboration for the kaiju film, Ghidorah, the Three-Headed Monster, making 1964 the only time two Godzilla movies were ever released in the same year (the first one being Mothra vs. Godzilla). Conceived as one of the features celebrating ten years of Toho's kaiju films, Ghidorah featured a dragon kaiju designed as an homage to Yamata no Orochi, King Ghidorah, who opposed Godzilla, Rodan, and Mothra in the film. Tsuburaya and Toho executives decided to anthropomorphize the monsters for the film, despite Honda feeling "uncomfortable" with the decision and being reluctant to use The Peanuts (who previously played Mothra's fairies in the namesake film) as the interpreters for the kaiju in the summit scene. Released on December 20, 1964, Ghidorah was a massive box office hit, grossing ¥375 million, relatively more than King Kong vs. Godzilla, the series' previous record holder. King Ghidorah would go on to become a frequent antagonist of the Godzilla franchise.

Tsuburaya began 1965 by directing the effects for Seiji Maruyama's war film Retreat from Kiska. Tsuburaya spent two months filming the scene where the fleet circles Kiska Island in thick fog on an indoor stage set since the fog could not be controlled by the wind during open shooting. The sequence where the fleet slips through the rocks was realized by laying a rail at the bottom of the special effects pool and running the warship's miniature on it. The miniatures could not be very large for on-set shooting, and the water flow was pumped to adjust the proportions of the waves and wakes. A large outdoor pool is used in the scene of port entry and departure without fog. For his work on Kiska, Tsuburaya won a Japan Technical Award for Special Skill at the 19th Japan Technical Awards.

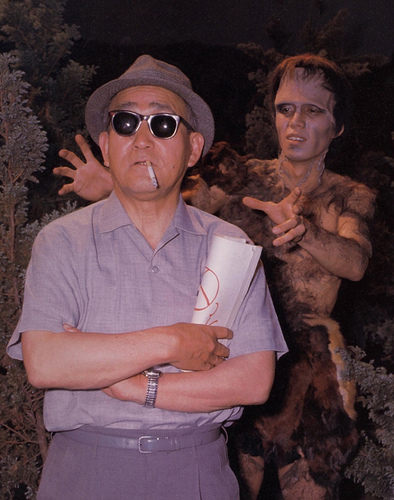
Tsuburaya (left) with Frankenstein actor Kōji Furuhata (right) on the set of Frankenstein vs. Baragon (1965)

His next production, Frankenstein vs. Baragon (1965), depicted Frankenstein's monster fighting a new subterranean kaiju, named Baragon in Japan. Tsuburaya was reportedly enthusiastic about working on the film because the titular monsters were going to be smaller than normal, allowing his team to build larger model sets than the ones used in Godzilla movies: plus, an actor in make-up—Kōji Furuhata—would be involved to play Frankenstein, rather than leaving the role to a stuntman in a monster suit. In spite of featuring model sets among the biggest and most detailed models for a Honda-Tsuburaya collaboration, some critics have questioned several of Tsuburaya's ideas, including a puppet used to portray a horse, instead of an actual equine, for a sequence in which Baragon overruns a farmstead. According to Koichi Takano, Tsuburaya said that he used the puppet because it was "more fun". Tsuburaya also made a scene depicting the atomic bomb falling upon Hiroshima, which Honda biographers Steve Ryfle and Ed Godziszewski called an "impressionistic display of smoke and fire".

After post-production on the film was finalized for its Japanese release, held two days after the twentieth anniversary of the Hiroshima atomic bombing (August 8, 1965), American co-producer Henry G. Saperstein asked for Toho to film a new ending for the U.S. version: Tsuburaya and Honda, accordingly, re-assembled the cast and crew to shoot the new ending, although it was eventually left unused in both American and Japanese iterations of the motion picture. Still, the alternative ending was later screened at a fan convention in 1982, before featuring as a bonus scene on home video.

Following Frankenstein vs. Baragon, Tsuburaya quickly moved on to his next film, Kengo Furusawa's The Crazy Adventure, produced in celebration of the tenth anniversary of the Crazy Cats comedy group. Inspired by popular spy films of the time, Tsuburaya's department extensively used "wire action" in outdoor locations, while lead actor Hitoshi Ueki performed most of the movie's action sequences without any stunts. (Note: Future Godzilla series special effects director Kōichi Kawakita, who began working at Toho in the 1960s, suggested that this was the first time that a full-fledged "wire action" was ever performed in a film.) Tsuburaya also directed miniature effects sequences for the film. Released in Japan on October 31, 1965, The Crazy Adventure was another box office hit for Tsuburaya, earning even more than Ghidorah, the Three-Headed Monster.

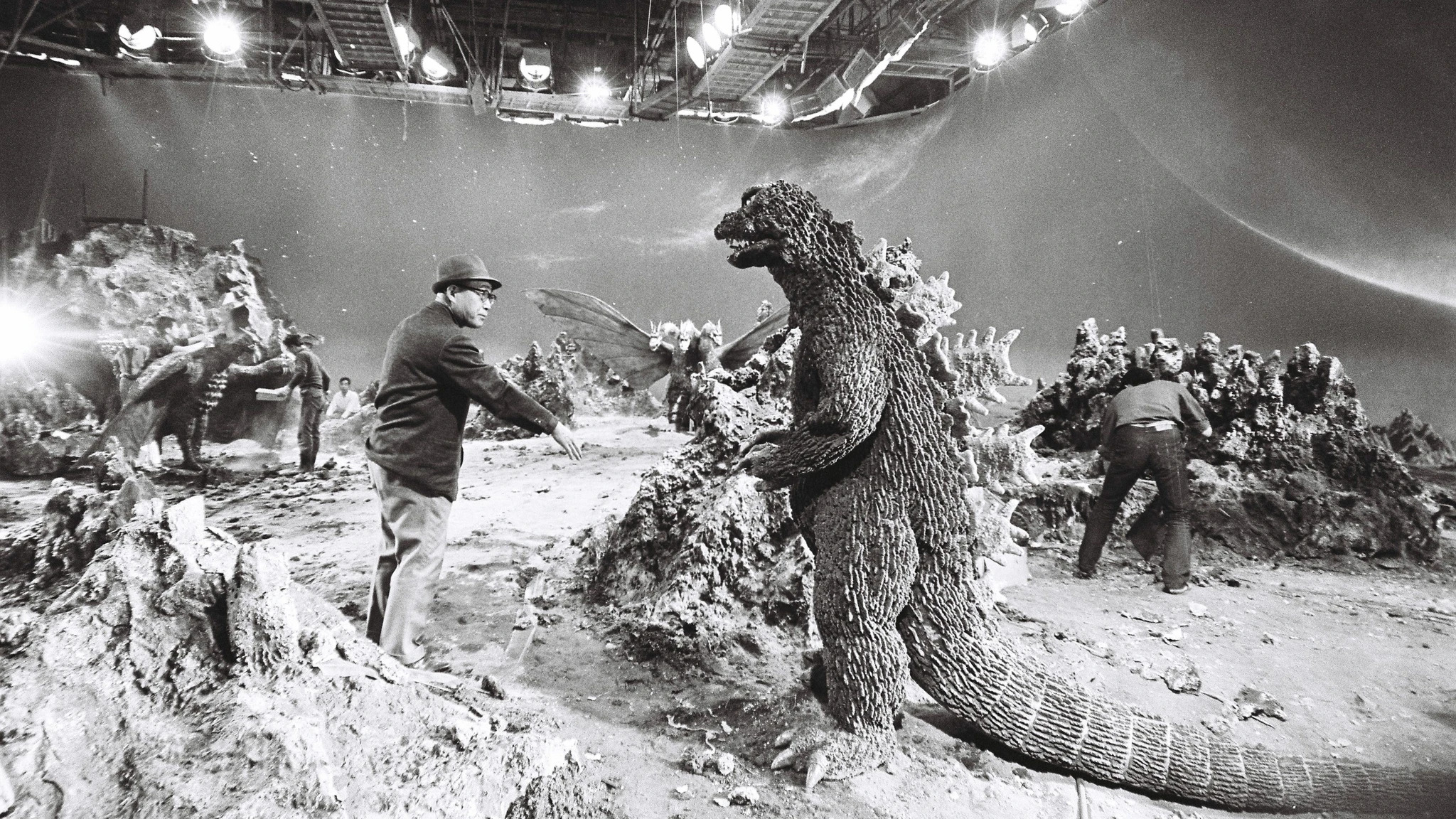
Tsuburaya directs Haruo Nakajima (in Godzilla suit) on the set of Invasion of Astro-Monster (1965)

Then, Tsuburaya worked on Honda's Invasion of Astro-Monster (1965), the sixth film in the Godzilla franchise and Shōwa period, as well as the second collaboration between Toho and UPA. A direct sequel to Ghidorah, the Three-Headed Monster, the movie focuses on two astronauts who land on a planet occupied by an alien race, known as the "Xiliens", as they ask humanity for assistance with Godzilla and Rodan in defeating the "intruder" King Ghidorah. After bringing the astronauts, scientist Sakurai, Godzilla, and Rodan to their planet, the aliens attempt to exploit Ghidorah, Godzilla, and Rodan to conquer the Earth by mind-controlling them. The last Godzilla film to feature the contributions of Tsuburaya's entire effects unit, Invasion of Astro-Monster notably features Godzilla's renowned victory dance, which derived from the shie! dance featured in Fujio Akatsuka's comedy manga series Osomatsu-kun (1962–1969), a popular culture sensation at the time of the film's production. The dance was included in the film after a Toho employee suggested it to Tsuburaya, who was already supportive of anthropomorphizing monster characters with comical characteristics. For his work on Invasion of Astro-Monster, the director obtained the Japan Technical Award for Special Skill the following year.

==== Ultraman and beyond (1966–1967) ====
At the height of Ultra Q's popularity, TBS aired "The Father of Ultra Q", an episode of their documentary series Modern Leaders, on June 2, 1966. Throughout the episode, Tsuburaya was filmed at work and elsewhere, being even interviewed by individuals dressed in Ultra Q monster costumes: in this instance, he mentioned for the first time that he was working on a new show to follow Ultra Q, which later turned out to be Ultraman.

Tsuburaya had begun working on the new tokusatsu series in the autumn of the previous year: TBS executives wanted to produce a series as thriving as Ultra Q and wanted a full-color program that would "take the monster line to the next level". Tsuburaya and writer Tetsuo Kinjō decided to take the barebones concept of Ultra Q about civilians and scientists haggling monsters: they came up with the idea of a group, tentatively named the "Scientific Investigation Agency" (SIA), formed to deal with kaiju and supernatural phenomena as the focus of the new show. The pair also agreed to add unused conceptions from Ultra Q and WoO. Tsuburaya had spent significant amounts of studio money to build his models for the Godzilla films, so TBS aimed to monetize these miniatures and was looking for a task that could repurpose the sets and suits from the Godzilla franchise.

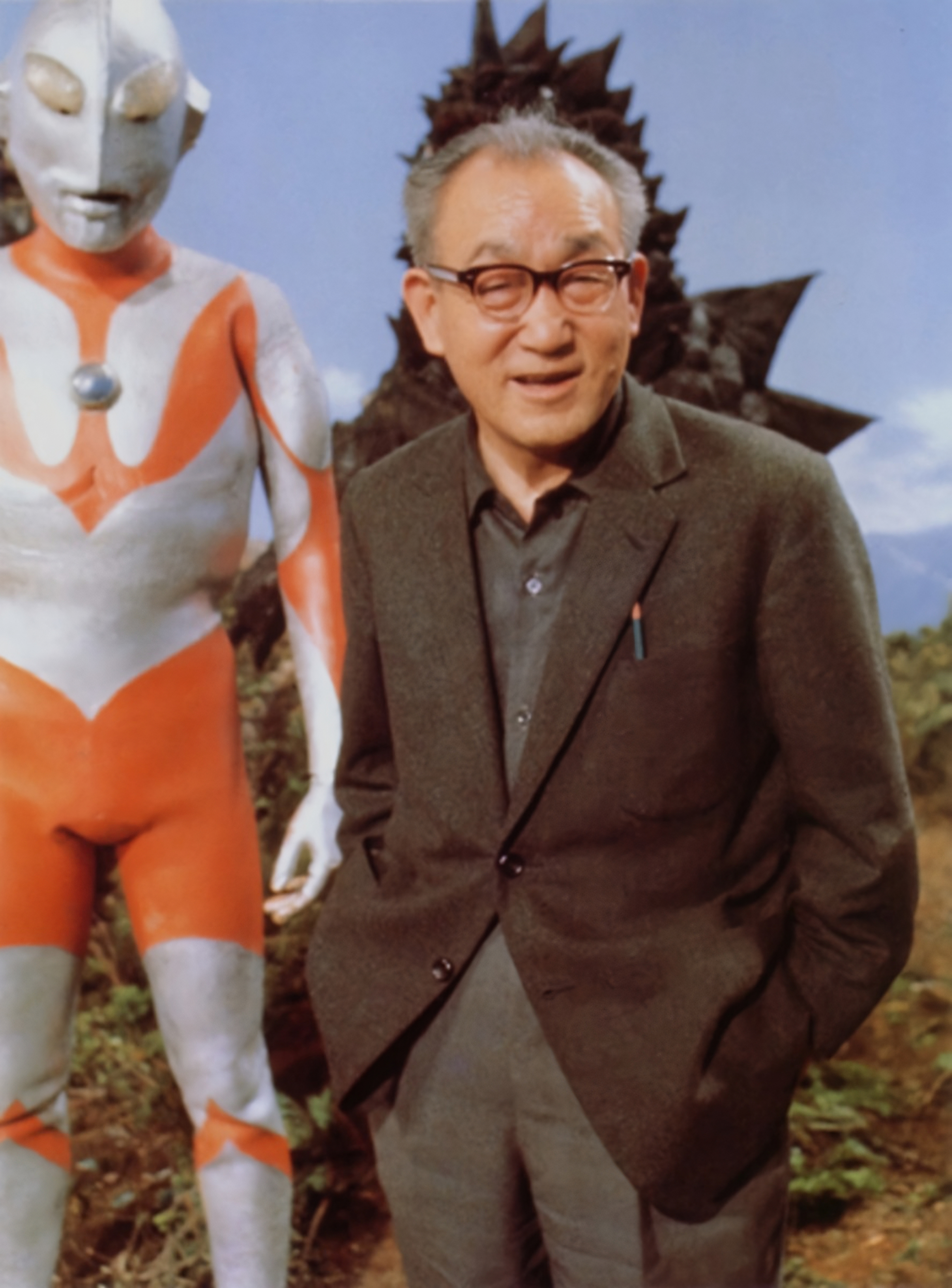
Tsuburaya with actor Bin Furuya (in Ultraman suit), c. 1966

During designing, Tsuburaya found the original versions of title character's design to be "too alien and sinister", and requested production designer Tohl Narita to keep drafting additional designs as teleplays were being written concurrently. Narita chose to root Ultraman's design in the Greek concept of cosmos (order and harmony), in contrast to his previous designs for Ultra Q, which had been inspired by the concept of khaos. Tsuburaya provided input on Narita's designs, with some being inspired by the art of Miyamoto Musashi. Ultraman's silver skin symbolized steel from an interstellar rocket, while the red lining represented the surface of Mars. As stated by biographer August Ragone, Ultraman became Tsuburaya's "most popular and enduring creation".

The filming sessions for Ultraman began in March 1966, and the crew was divided into three separate groups for its live-action and special effects. Tsuburaya Productions and TBS initially planned to start broadcasting the series on July 17, 1966, but the latter company chose to release it the week before. Tsuburaya supervised the production of every episode of the series and served as the de facto special effects director for episodes 18 and 19.

After a few meetings between the two companies and sponsors, it was decided that a pilot episode, originally planned as the "Ultraman Eve Festival", would introduce the show's title character. The pilot episode was aired on July 10—one of the dates that have been cited as Tsuburaya's birthday— of that same year, under the title The Birth of Ultraman: An Ultraman Premiere Celebration. Ultraman became a larger hit than its predecessor, obtaining a 40% viewership. With monsters now available to watch at home weekly, children fewer asked their parents to take them to the theater: consequently, Tsuburaya Productions' triumph in television was diverting box-office money from Toho's kaiju films.

Also in 1966, Tsuburaya worked once again with Honda for the kaiju film The War of the Gargantuas, produced in collaboration with Henry G. Saperstein, which centered on scientists investigating the appearance of two giant hairy humanoids who eventually fight each other in Tokyo. Initially drafted as a sequel to Frankenstein vs. Baragon, the film went through several tentative titles during scripting, and the final film was referred to by film chronicler Stuart Galbraith IV as a "quasi–sequel" to its predecessor. The film premiered in Japan in July 1966.

After Tsuburaya's series Booska the Friendly Beast began airing on television in November 1966, he received his last credit as "special effects director" on a Godzilla film for Ebirah, Horror of the Deep. However, his disciple Sadamasa Arikawa actually served as a de facto special effects director for this film, with Tsuburaya's credit being merely ceremonial. The following year, Tsuburaya directed the effects for King Kong Escapes, a Japanese-American co-production created to celebrate Toho's thirty-fifth anniversary. In homage to the dinosaur fighting scene from King Kong (1933), the director introduced Gorosaurus, a dinosaurian kaiju that battles Kong on Mondo Island in the film. The ensuing 1967 release featuring Tsuburaya's contributions was Ultraseven, the third entry in the Ultra series, which had been influenced by the British TV series Thunderbirds. The series received a 33.7% rating upon beginning airing on October 7, 1967. Also in 1967, he was appointed "special effects supervisor" and handed over the position of special effects director for the Godzilla film series to Arikawa, starting with Son of Godzilla.

==== Final works, last years, and death (1968–1970) ====
In 1967, Tsuburaya Productions' writing crew took elements from Shinichi Sekizawa's screenplay, The Flying Battleship, and inserted concepts from it into a TV series, Mighty Jack, which was similar in concept to James Bond and Voyage to the Bottom of the Sea. Concerning a team of secret agents established by a prosperous industrialist to oppose the acts of a military organization, referred to as "Q", Mighty Jack was aimed at a more mature audience, in contrary to the Ultra series and Booska the Friendly Beast. Due to pressure from Fuji TV, the series declined rapidly after the release of its first episode on April 6, 1968, as a consequence of its poor quality: many teleplays were filmed without revision, effects work frequently lacked time, and reshoots were often unattainable. Fuji TV considered the series as a commercial failure, due to its 8.3% audience rating, and they canceled it after Tsuburaya Productions had finished producing just 13 of the scheduled 26 episodes. A sequel to the series, titled Fight! Mighty Jack, later began broadcasting in July 1968.

With budgets rising, less returning crew, and theatergoers being dragged away by television, producer Tomoyuki Tanaka chose to conclude the Godzilla series but offered one last film for the original staff. Honda's consequential kaiju epic, Destroy All Monsters (1968), featured effects directed by Sadamasa Arikawa, which Tsuburaya allegedly supervised. His next release of that year was another Seiji Maruyama's war epic, Admiral Yamamoto, which starred Toshiro Mifune as Imperial Japanese Navy Marshal Admiral Isoroku Yamamoto (who was previously the topic of Honda and Tsuburaya's Eagle of the Pacific). Destroy All Monsters was the twelfth-highest grossing domestic film of 1968, registering an approximately ¥170 million-worth gain, while Admiral Yamamoto was the second-highest grosser, at roughly ¥400 million. On September 15, 1968, the week after the final episode of Ultraseven was broadcast and just over a month after Admiral Yamamoto was distributed to Japanese theaters by Toho, the director's following project for Tsuburaya Productions, Operation: Mystery, began airing on the TBS, where he served as the show's supervisor.

Latitude Zero, released by Toho in July 1969, was a Japanese-American collaboration produced by Toho and Don Sharp Productions. The production was reported to have had a budget of ¥360 million (equivalent to about $1 million), but Tsuburaya's department had difficulty making realistic creatures for the picture after its American producer pulled out of the project. In comparison, retrospective writers have praised Tsuburaya's model work, especially his submarines, which Ryfle and Godziszewski noted resembled Thunderbirds machines in Gerry Anderson's show of the same name. Like Honda and Tsuburaya's previous effort, Latitude Zero only grossed ¥170 million ($472,000), making it a box office failure.

Tsuburaya quickly moved on to his next project, Battle of the Japan Sea, regarded as the third film in the "Toho 8.15 series" (following Japan's Longest Day and Admiral Yamamoto). Tsuburaya was provided with his largest budget ever for the Seiji Maruyama-directed war epic film about the Russo-Japanese War. Thus, 60 members of his department's artists created an estimated 107 ship miniatures for the film and constructed a 13-meter model replica of the Imperial Japanese Navy's battleship Mikasa, in contrast to the other 3-meter ships. Released in August 1969, Battle of the Japan Sea was the second highest Japanese grosser of 1969, earning ¥360 million against its ¥350 million budget. Deemed one of Tsuburaya's masterpieces, Battle of the Japan Sea was the last production he officially took part in as the special effects director. On the same month, Tsuburaya Productions' next series, Horror Theater Unbalance (aired in 1973), entered the production process: Tsuburaya was credited as its supervisor.

Tsuburaya and several of Toho's effects crew members spent the majority of 1969 working together to create Birth of the Japanese Islands, an audiovisual exhibit simulating earthquakes and volcanoes, which was set to be part of Mitsubishi's pavilion at the Expo '70 in Suita, Osaka Prefecture. His commitment to the project prevented him from being involved in the production of All Monsters Attack (1969), and director Honda handled special effects instead of him for the first time. Nonetheless, the director stated that Tsuburaya was "personally involved with the editing," adding: "The film may have been generally put together [by others], but he definitely looked it over and instructed the staff to shorten certain scenes, and so on."

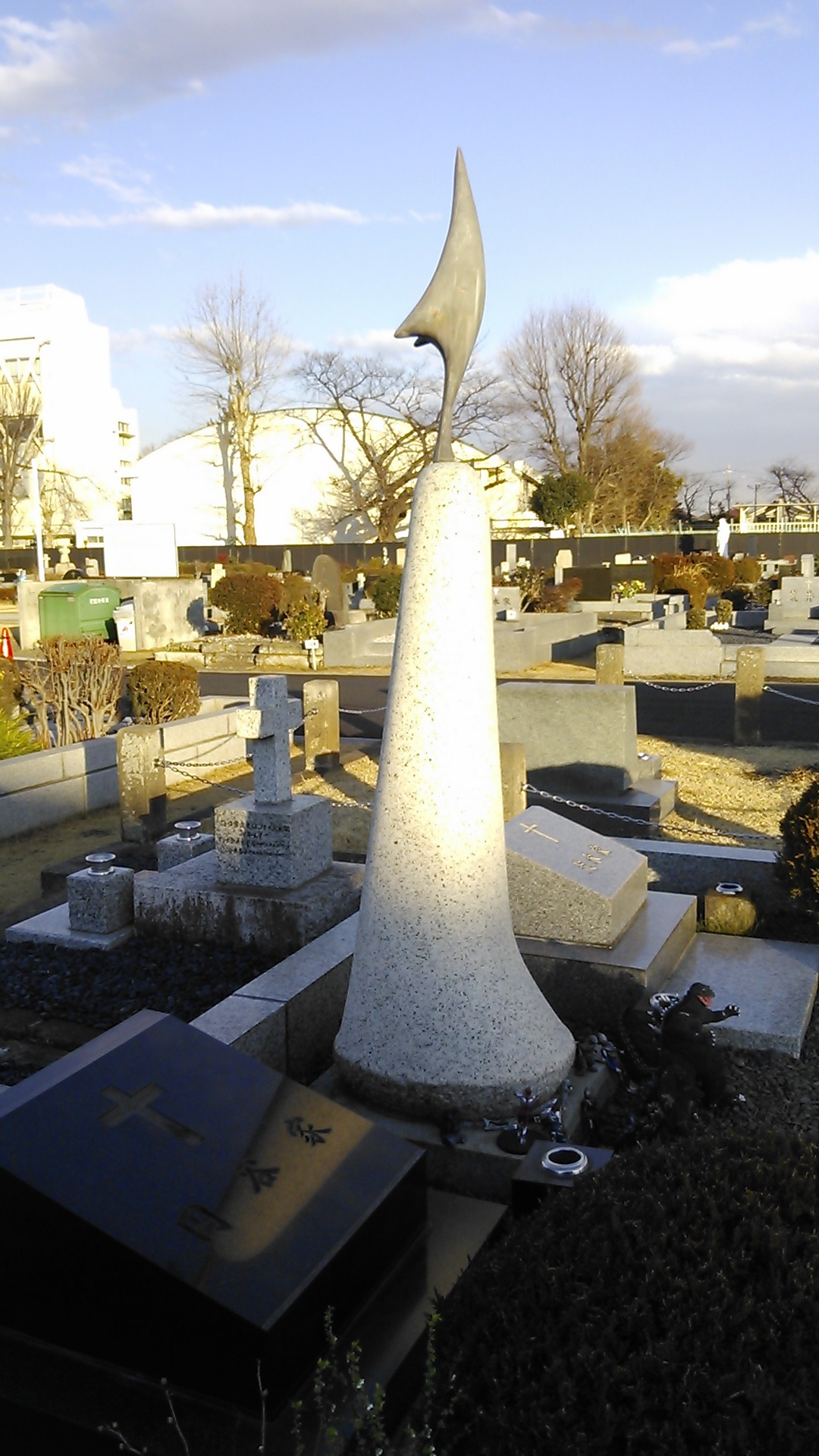
Tsuburaya's grave at the Catholic Cemetery in Fuchū, Tokyo

Ignoring his doctor's recent advice to reduce his workload due to declining health, Tsuburaya started displaying symptoms of unstable angina, and he collapsed while visiting the Naruto whirlpools during the shooting sessions for the Expo '70 film presentation. He was subsequently sent to Mishuku Hospital in Meguro to continue his recovery, but refused to remain there, as he expected to complete Birth of the Japanese Islands on schedule: instead, he accepted an offer to recover and receive medical treatment at Ukiyama Villa on the Izu Peninsula in Itō, Shizuoka, where he was instructed to cancel any assignments. Concerned about Tsuburaya's future, his son Hajime quit his job at TBS and officially took over his father's position as the president of Tsuburaya Productions on November 30, 1969.

In December 1969, Tsuburaya completed filming the Expo '70 project and moved to his Ukiyama Villa with his wife Masano, where he persisted in writing his autobiography and the film outlines Japan Airplane Guy and Princess Kaguya. While continuing to write the Japan Airplane Guy story treatment daily, he expressed his desire to work on more projects in the future and return to Tokyo on January 26, 1970. However, on January 25, 1970, at 10:15 P.M., Masano awoke and discovered that Tsuburaya had died while sleeping with her at the villa in Itō, Shizuoka: he was 68 years old. Japanese sources have cited the cause of his death as angina associated with an asthma attack.

On January 27, a mourning tradition took place at the Tsuburaya family's house. His funeral was held at the Seijō Catholic Church on January 29, with his eldest son Hajime serving as the chief mourner. The following day, he was posthumously awarded the Honorary Chairman Award by the Japanese Society of Cinematographers and the Order of the Sacred Treasure by emperor Hirohito. A Catholic service was held at Toho Studios on February 2, with The Last War producer Sanezumi Fujimoto providing the services. Five hundred friends and colleagues attended the service, including actor Kazuo Hasegawa, The War at Sea from Hawaii to Malaya director Kajirō Yamamoto, The Three Treasures director Hiroshi Inagaki, and A Thousand and One Nights with Toho director Kon Ichikawa. He was later entombed at the Catholic Cemetery in Fuchū, Tokyo, Japan.

== Filmmaking ==
=== Style, themes, and techniques ===
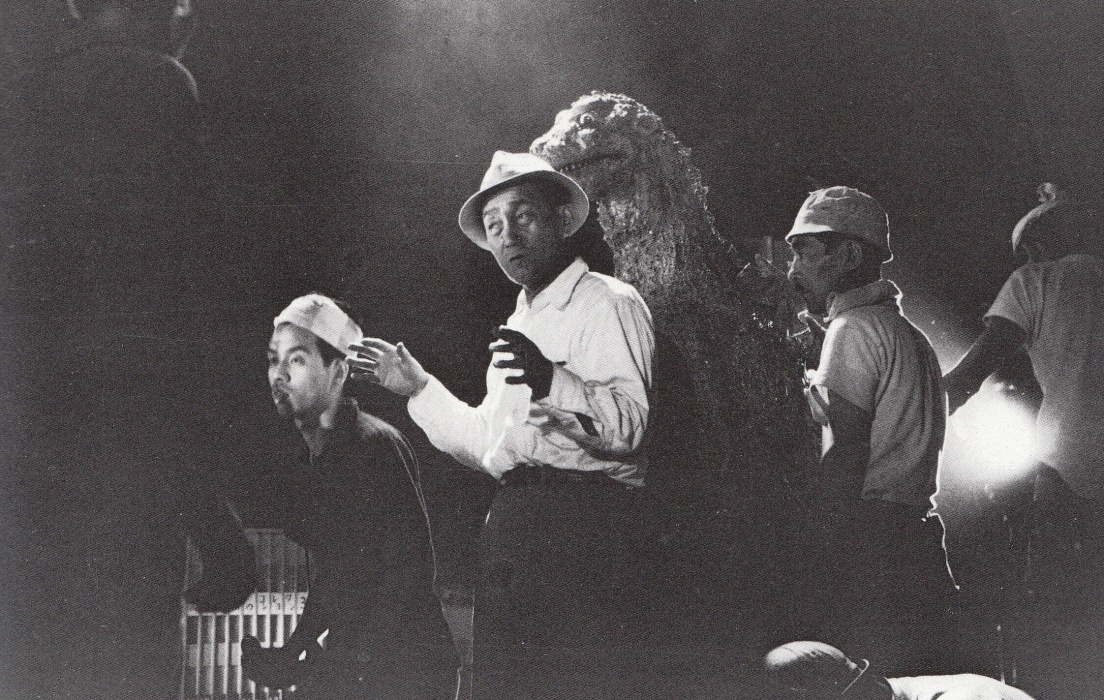
Tsuburaya directs his special effects crew on the set of Godzilla (1954). The film's namesake monster portrayed via "suitmation" (behind Tsuburaya) symbolizes nuclear holocaust.

Tsuburaya's career in film production evolved from small-scale jidaigeki films to financially successful war and science fiction epics. During his stint as a cinematographer in the early 20th century, Tsuburaya closely researched international cinema in order to incorporate some of the techniques and improve his innovative style; some of these films include: The Lost World (1925), Metropolis (1927), and King Kong (1933). Tsuburaya remarked that King Kong heavily influenced him to work in special effects. He decided to create special effects sequences in films by using miniature effects and synthesis technology involving layered film strips. Tsuburaya constantly converted new special effects techniques and tested them on a daily basis and became the founder and head of Japanese special effects (known as Tokusatsu), earning him the title "Father of Tokusatsu". Biographer August Ragone writes that his footage, which was always filmed live on a soundstage, in comparison to modern techniques such as computer-generated imagery, could be "silly or deadly, beautiful or terrifying, but no matter how fanciful or fantastic, his visual effects seem to live and breathe with a life of their own."

For Godzilla (1954), Tsuburaya decided to create a new suit acting technique, later known as "suitmation", because the film's small budget and tight schedule restrained him from portraying Godzilla via stop motion (à la King Kong). Film historian Steve Ryfle writes that, although suitmation was not as elaborate as the stop motion techniques by effects pioneers Willis H. O'Brien (creator of the effects in King Kong) and Ray Harryhausen (creator of the effects in The Beast from 20,000 Fathoms), it gave the special effects director a more effective approach to depict the destruction sequences that made Godzilla famous.

Tsuburaya's endeavors in films often depicted nuclear holocausts, world wars, monster invasions, and intergalactic conflicts. Despite his movies featuring these apocalyptic and mass destructive themes, he opposed including themes of graphic violence—especially bleeding and slaughter—in his kaiju films, believing it was inappropriate for the younger members of the audience. However, Toho executives (such as Iwao Mori) urged Tsuburaya to feature gore in his kaiju films during the late 1960s, due to the rise in popularity of juvenile-targeted television shows that featured an increase in violent content, with even Tsuburaya's own shows Ultraman and Ultraseven depicting heroes decapitating, slashing, chopping, or otherwise injuring their monster adversaries. According to his protégé Teruyoshi Nakano, Tsuburaya told Toho executives: "These movies are for kids. It's nonsense. Why do you enjoy showing them blood?" Rather than have violent themes in his films, Tsuburaya continually employed lighthearted comedy and humanism in his tokusatsu work. As written by Ryfle, it is implied that this is due to him still being a "child at heart" and having a "soft spot in his heart for children" during his late life. In 1962, Tsuburaya explained: "My heart and mind are as they were when I was a child. Then I loved to play with toys and to read stories of magic. I still do. My wish is only to make life happier and more beautiful for those who will go and see my films of fantasy." His compassion for children helped shape his legacy; notably, the Godzilla films produced after his death, featuring effects by Nakano, displayed large amounts of graphic violence.

=== Relationship with cast and crew ===
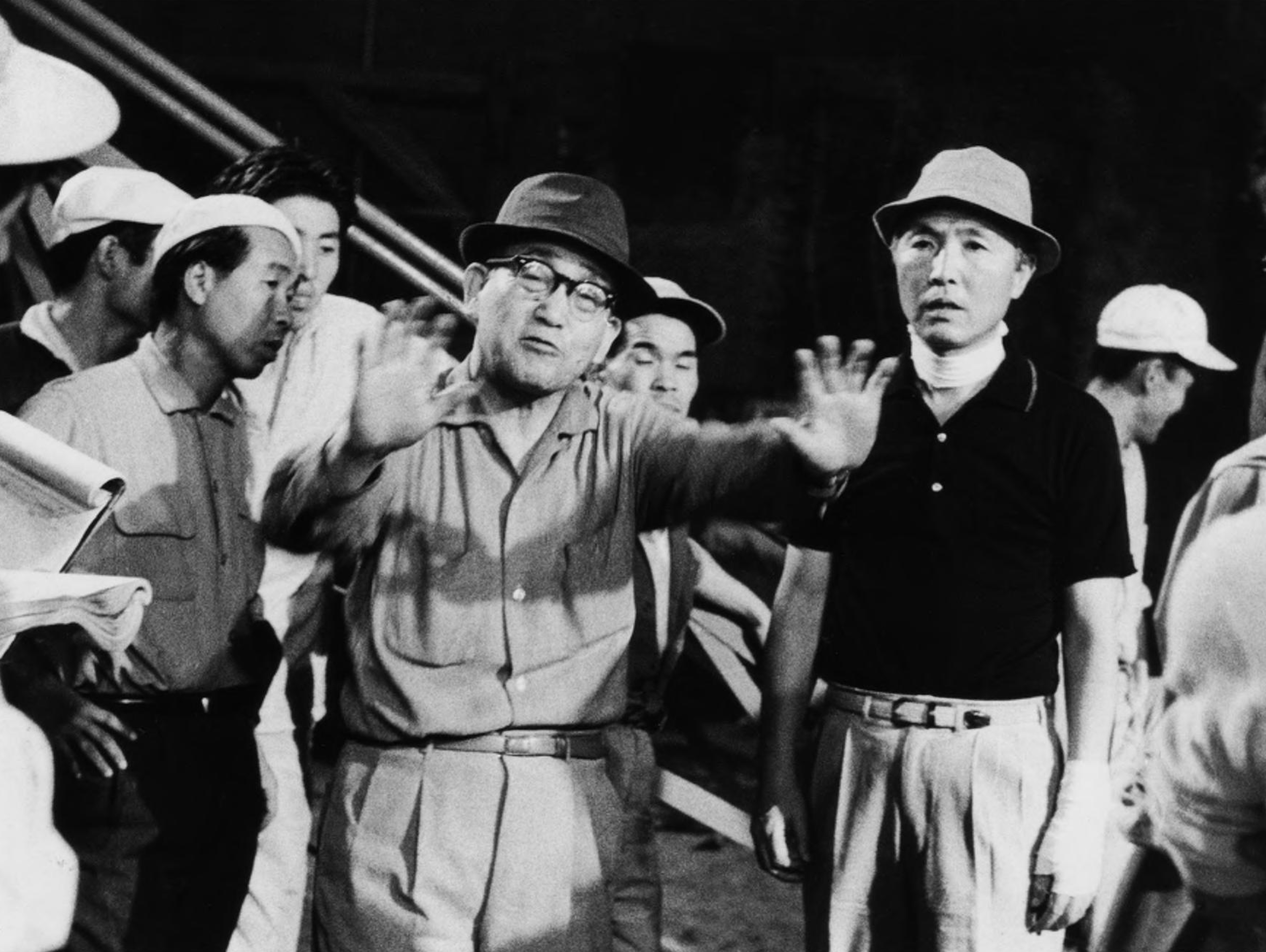
Tsuburaya (center) with director Ishirō Honda (right) and crew members on the Faro Island set of King Kong vs. Godzilla (1962)

According to Ishirō Honda biographers Steve Ryfle and Ed Godziszewski, it was challenging to cooperate with Tsuburaya, especially for directors. Tsuburaya refused to surrender control of his sector to the mainstream director: he refused to allow directors to stare into the viewfinder in case they assessed elements like the set or camera position and opposed when his footage was re-edited. During the production of Godzilla (1954), however, Tsuburaya formed a bond with Honda, who had a completely different personality, being deemed as calm and courteous, rarely expressing his emotions towards others. Ryfle and Godziszewski stated that the two infrequently interacted outside Toho Studios and were not personal comrades, but nevertheless shared a "tsu-ka relationship". (Note: According to Ryfle and Godziszewski: "Tsu-ka describes an unusually close personal understanding between friends.") Honda's assistant director Kōji Kajita said that "Other directors such as Hiroshi Inagaki, Jun Fukuda, and Shūe Matsubayashi also worked with Mr. Tsuburaya, but they were all the 'me-first' type and they really didn't work well together. Directors tend to think they are number one, and the effects team should just follow behind. Mr. Tsuburaya didn't appreciate that. Honda-san and Mr. Tsuburaya got along so well because they were both very mature men."

Despite often making unrelenting directions on his crew, Tsuburaya was admired by colleagues, many of whom were younger than him and called him an "uncle", mentor, or the "Old Man". Godzilla suit actor Haruo Nakajima remarked that although Tsuburaya was usually smiling and had a refreshing disposition onset, he was often angry with the staff. Special effects cinematographer Tomioka Mototaka claimed he was in a position to be scolded by Tsuburaya against cinematographer Sadamasa Arikawa; photography assistants Takao Tsurumi and Mitsuru Chokai testified that Tsuburaya did not get angry directly when young individuals in his unit failed, but scolded Arikawa and others, instead.

On the contrary, Tsuburaya was rarely infuriated by actors. In an interview regarding August Ragone's biography on Tsuburaya, Nakajima said he was a "very reserved man on the set. Most of the direction he gave me for the performances was, 'I trust you to do it. Do what you feel is best, I'll leave it up to you.' And that's the way he was for most of the films we worked on together after Godzilla." He added: "After the wires broke on the Rodan suit, causing me to fall several meters onto the miniature set, he chided, 'It's good that you didn't die; because I need you to finish the film.'" In an interview regarding Nezura 1964 (2020), Ultraman suit actor Bin Furuya remarked that Tsuburaya was "usually a normal kind person" and always encouraged his actors to "act as if they were in the kind of film that would give dreams to children".

=== Production and editing ===
Tsuburaya had several methods to shoot his films. During his stint as a cinematographer, he was the first to use crane shooting and key light prior to World War II. According to camera operator Mitsuo Miura, Tsuburaya also filmed "pseudo nightscapes" using beer bottle fragments as a filter, and his disciple Sadamasa Arikawa became the first photographer in Japan to shoot with color filters. During his late life, Tsuburaya explained to cinematographer Tomioka that he had always recognized how many frames could be taken with a hand-cranked camera, and he was able to turn it instinctively.

Honda said that Tsuburaya's approach to film special effects was "like a physics experiment, no different than trying to make new discoveries." Tsuburaya's lighting engineer Kaoru Saitō remarked that his camera work in special effects only moved sideways or moves up and down with a crane once the main position is decided, and the camera itself does not approach forward. Saitō also testified that he demanded the subject approach the camera and never shot the set from the other side of the camera.

When he brainstormed ideas for a new film, Tsuburaya was known for his quiet but intense style. Nakano stated: "I heard about this episode when Mr. Tsuburaya was returning home from work one day and he ran into this woman who kind of looked familiar to him. So he said, 'Hello, it's been a long time.' Do you know who that woman was? It was his wife! Mr. Tsuburaya was so deep into his own thoughts, he kind of lost himself sometimes."

According to Arikawa, Tsuburaya also edited his own film work. Tsuburaya's assistant director, Masakatsu Asai, stated that he memorized the situation and storage location of the cuts he shot. Scripter Keiko Suzuki said Tsuburaya envisioned his own editing plan, and he often filmed scenes unscripted. Thus, for instance, scenes were altered from "Battle 1" to "Aerial Battle 2".

== Legacy ==
=== Cultural impact ===
Eiji is a true inspiration, and a one of a kind innovator of special effects, the likes of which we'll probably never see again in cinema.

— Monsters (2010) and Godzilla (2014) director Gareth Edwards

In spite of his death, Tsuburaya's name and work remained prominent because his tokusatsu films and television shows generated a global fandom. A year after his death, Tsuburaya's intent to revitalize Ultraman was eventuated into Return of Ultraman (1971-1972), which launched a new string of the "Ultra" series throughout the rest of the decade. Despite having difficulty after their father's death, Hajime, Noboru, and Akira kept running Tsuburaya Productions and never gave up his legacy, even when Tsuburaya Productions only had just three employees before the home video revived the Ultraman series. In 1989, Noboru declared that Ultraman is his father's "most important legacy" even if Godzilla is Tsuburaya's most popular character overseas.

Contemporary writers have frequently stated that Tsuburaya is one of the most influential figures in the history of cinema, with biographer August Ragone claiming that Tsuburaya's cinematic importance is on par with Akira Kurosawa. The Independent's Doug Bolton wrote that even "people not familiar with Japanese science fiction will easily recognise [sic] the legacy of Tsuburaya's work". The Tokusatsu Network said that Tsuburaya was "possibly the most influential figure in the Japanese film industry" and stated that his legacy "lives on to this day through his creations and has had a large enough impact for him to be compared to Walt Disney."

Numerous people in the entertainment industry have spoken of their appreciation for Tsuburaya's work or cited it as an inspiration on their own work, including Steven Spielberg, George Lucas, Martin Scorsese, Brad Pitt, Quentin Tarantino, Stanley Kubrick, John Carpenter, Shinya Tsukamoto, Hideaki Anno, Will Smith, Chris Kirkpatrick, Guillermo del Toro, Shinji Higuchi, Shunji Iwai, Kazuo Miyagawa, and Attack on Titan creator Hajime Isayama. During the early 1970s, Lucas visited Toho when looking for a company to produce the special effects for Star Wars (1977) since Tsuburaya had established the company as a powerhouse for producing special effects. Spielberg stated that Tsuburaya's Godzilla was the "most masterful of all the dinosaur movies, because it made you believe that it was really happening." His work has also been cited as the inspiration for the music video of Beastie Boys' song "Intergalactic", the series Power Rangers and the film Pacific Rim, among other projects.

=== Tributes ===
Tsuburaya had intended to work on Honda's Space Amoeba (1970), but he died shortly after filming began. While the film was completed in Tsuburaya's honor and was his last project to be involved in, Toho executives refused to grant him a dedication in its opening credits.

A script for a project entitled Princess Kaguya was written by Tsuburaya shortly before he died in Izu. Motivated by his father's desire to work on another adaptation of the tale, Hajime Tsubruaya attempted to produce Princess Kaguya into a film for Tsuburaya Productions' 10th anniversary. In the preface of Hiroyasu Yamaura's script for the film, Hajime said he had taken "great pains to incorporate the strengths of various folk tales and fairy tales into a work that children around the world would honestly enjoy". Despite his tireless efforts, he died on the morning of February 9, 1973, before director Yoshiyuki Kuroda was scheduled to begin production that evening. Thus, production on the project was canceled. In 1987, producer Tomoyuki Tanaka turned Eiji Tsuburaya's lifelong ambition into a live-action movie titled Princess from the Moon, which featured effects directed by Tsuburaya's protégé Teruyoshi Nakano.

In 2001, two toy companies distributed figures of Tsuburaya in honor of the 100th anniversary of his birth. In celebration of the 114th anniversary of his birth, Google artist Jennifer Hom and her colleagues made an animated doodle of his work in special effects on July 7, 2015. The doodle allowed users to create a scene from one of Tsuburaya's key monster movies and television shows.

On January 11, 2019, after construction over a period of five years, the Eiji Tsuburaya Museum opened in his hometown of Sukagawa, a tribute to his life and work in film and television. During the museum's opening ceremony, Mayor Katsuya Hashimoto stated that the museum is "an archival center that will disseminate Japanese special effects to the world." Later that year, filmmaker Minoru Kawasaki began filming Monster Seafood Wars, a kaiju film loosely based on his unmade film prior to production of Godzilla about a giant octopus that attacked Tokyo.

In commemoration of 120 years since his birth, the National Film Archive of Japan held a celebratory event in Sukagawa in cooperation with Tsuburaya Productions from August to November 2021. In September 2021, the first screening of Princess Kaguya since its original 1935 release was held at the event (However, it was in shortened form since the original print is still believed to be lost).

On July 10, 2022, a screening of Shin Ultraman (2022) was held at the City Cultural Center in Sukagawa as a tribute to Tsuburaya and his series Ultraman (1966-1967), on which the film was based. The screening was attended by an estimated 950 people, with Shin Ultraman director Shinji Higuchi and star Takumi Saitoh discussing the legacy of Tsuburaya's work afterward.

Filmmaker and visual effects artist Takashi Yamazaki paid homage to Tsuburaya's work in his acclaimed 2023 film Godzilla Minus One.

=== Portrayals ===
Many actors have played Tsuburaya in television dramas and programs. For his portrayal in the 1989 television drama The Men Who Made Ultraman, an unidentified renowned Toho actor who had been starring in many of the company's box office hits since before Godzilla (1954) was initially cast as Tsuburaya. However, the famed actor declined the offer, believing he lacked resemblance in appearance to Tsuburaya and therefore was replaced by actor Kō Nishimura. In 1993, filmmaker Seijun Suzuki played Tsuburaya in the television drama I Loved Ultraseven. For The Pair of Ultraman, a 2022 television documentary on the two screenwriters behind Ultraman, he was portrayed by Toshiki Ayada.

== Selected filmography ==
Because he worked on roughly 250 films over his five-decade career, the following is only a selection of significant productions, and a more comprehensive list, including most of the media that featured his contributions, is covered in a separate article.

=== Films ===
- A Page of Madness (1926)
- Princess Kaguya (1935)
- Across the Equator (1936)
- The Daughter of the Samurai (1937)
- The Abe Clan (1938)
- The Burning Sky (1940)
- The War at Sea from Hawaii to Malaya (1942)
- The Opium War (1943)
- Fire on that Flag! (1944)
- General Kato's Falcon Fighters (1944)
- An Enemy of the People (1946)
- A Thousand and One Nights with Toho (1947)
- Gate of Flesh (1948)
- The Invisible Man Appears (1949)
- Escape at Dawn (1950)
- Listen to the Voices of the Sea (1950)
- The Lady of Musashino (1951)
- The Skin of the South (1952)
- The Man Who Came to Port (1952)
- Anatahan (1953)
- Eagle of the Pacific (1953)
- Farewell Rabaul (1954)
- Samurai I: Musashi Miyamoto (1954)
- Godzilla (1954)
- The Invisible Avenger (1954)
- Godzilla Raids Again (1955)
- Half Human (1955)
- The Maiden Courtesan (1956)
- The Legend of the White Serpent (1956)
- Rodan (1956)
- Throne of Blood (1957)
- The Mysterians (1957)
- The H-Man (1958)
- Varan the Unbelievable (1958)
- The Hidden Fortress (1958)
- Monkey Sun (1959)
- Submarine I-57 Will Not Surrender (1959)
- The Three Treasures (1959)
- Battle in Outer Space (1959)
- The Secret of the Telegian (1960)
- Storm Over the Pacific (1960)
- The Human Vapor (1960)
- The Story of Osaka Castle (1961)
- Mothra (1961)
- The Last War (1961)
- Gorath (1962)
- The Big Wave (1962)
- King Kong vs. Godzilla (1962)
- Chūshingura (1962)
- Attack Squadron! (1963)
- The Love Eterne (1963)
- Legacy of the 500,000 (1963)
- Matango (1963)
- The Lost World of Sinbad (1963)
- Atragon (1963)
- Whirlwind (1964)
- Mothra vs. Godzilla (1964)
- Dogora (1964)
- Ghidorah, the Three-Headed Monster (1964)
- None but the Brave (1965)
- Frankenstein vs. Baragon (1965)
- The Crazy Adventure (1965)
- Invasion of Astro-Monster (1965)
- The War of the Gargantuas (1966)
- Ebirah, Horror of the Deep (1966)
- King Kong Escapes (1967)
- Ultraman: Monster Movie Feature (1967)
- Son of Godzilla (1967)
- Destroy All Monsters (1968)
- Admiral Yamamoto (1968)
- Samurai Banners (1969)
- Latitude Zero (1969)
- Battle of the Japan Sea (1969)
- All Monsters Attack (1969)

=== Television ===
- Mighty Atom (1959–1960)
- Ultra Q (1966)
- Ultraman (1966–1967)
- Booska the Friendly Beast (1966–1967)
- Ultraseven (1967–1968)
- Mighty Jack (1968)
- Fight! Mighty Jack (1968)
- Operation: Mystery (1968–1969)
- Horror Theater Unbalance (1973) (Note: Produced in 1969, the year prior to Tsuburaya's death.)

== Awards and honors ==
Year	Award	Category	Nominated work	Result	Ref(s)
1940	Japanese Society of Cinematographers	Special Technology Award	The Burning Sky	Won	
1942	Japanese Society of Cinematographers	Technical Research Award	The War at Sea from Hawaii to Malaya	Won	
1954	8th Japan Technical Awards	Special Skill	Godzilla	Won	
1957	11th Japan Technical Awards	Special Skill	The Mysterians	Won	
1959	13th Japan Technical Awards	Special Skill	The Three Treasures	Won	
1959	4th Movie Day	Special Award of Merit	—N/a	Won	
1963	17th Japan Technical Awards	Special Skill	The Lost World of Sinbad	Won	
1965	19th Japan Technical Awards	Special Skill	Retreat from Kiska	Won	
1966	20th Japan Technical Awards	Special Skill	Invasion of Astro-Monster	Won	
1970	—N/a	4th Class Medal of the Order of the Sacred Treasure	—N/a	Won	
1970	Japanese Society of Cinematographers	Honorary Chairman Award	—N/a	Won	
2025	Visual Effects Society	Hall of Fame	—N/a	Won	

== Notes ==
Preceded by none	President of Tsuburaya Productions; 1963–1969	Succeeded by Hajime Tsuburaya
