= Across the Equator =

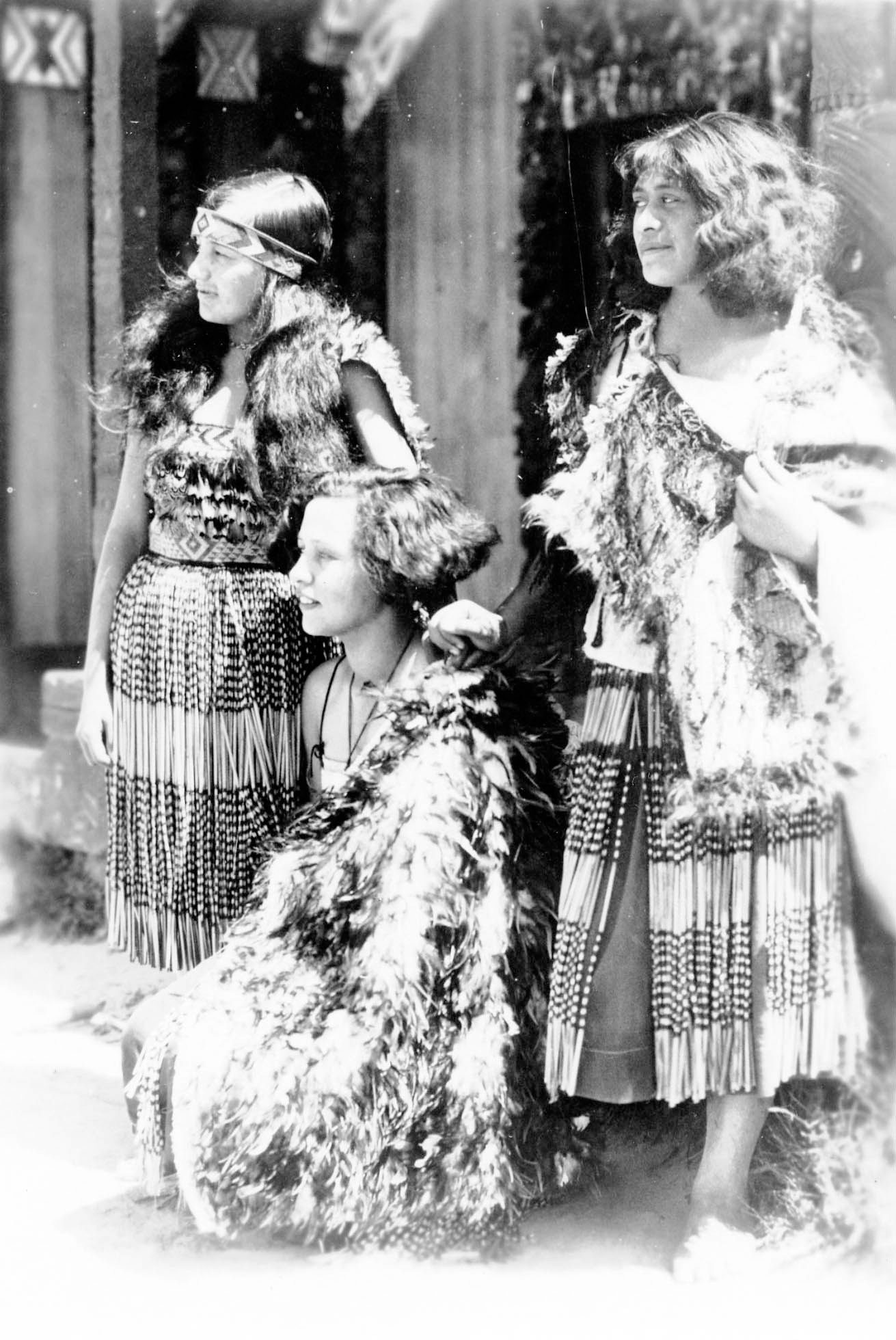
- Production still
- Directed by: Eiji Tsuburaya (Note: Credited as Eiji Tsumuraya.)
- Cinematography: Eiji Tsuburaya
- Edited by: Chūzō Aochi
- Music by: Nobuyoshi Shiraki
- Production companies: Nikkatsu; Futosou Talkie
- Distributed by: Nikkatsu
- Release date: January 15, 1936
- Running time: 86 minutes
- Country: Japan
- Language: Japanese

Across the Equator (Japanese: 赤道越えて, Hepburn: Sekidō Koete) is a 1936 Japanese propaganda documentary film directed by Eiji Tsuburaya in his directorial debut. Produced and distributed by Nikkatsu, it was shot by Tsuburaya from February to August 1935, whom traveled across the Pacific on the cruiser Asama.

== Production ==
Traveling on the cruiser ship Asama, director and cinematographer Eiji Tsuburaya filmed the film in Hawaii, the Philippines, Australia, and New Zealand. According to the Museum of Modern Art, the film was prepared by Yoshio Osawa of J.O. Studios in Kyoto as a request by the Academy of Motion Picture Arts and Sciences to illustrate contemporary developments in Japanese sound film techniques.

== Release ==
Across the Equator was released in Japan on January 15, 1936 and was later screened at 4:00 p.m. on May 20, 2015, at the Museum of Modern Art.
