= Nangoku no hada =

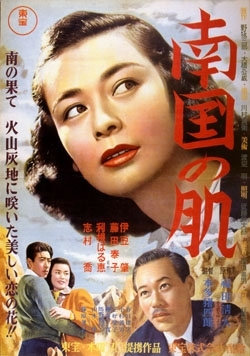
- Directed by: Ishirō Honda
- Screenplay by: Ishirō Honda
- Based on: "Virginal Land of Flowers" by Seito Fukuda
- Produced by: Saburo Nosaka; Koi Ohashi
- Starring: Hajime Izu; Yasuko Fujita; Takashi Shimura; Kamatari Fujiwara
- Cinematography: Kiyoe Kawamura
- Music by: Yasushi Akutagawa
- Production company: Mokuyo
- Distributed by: Toho
- Release date: 28 February 1952 (Japan)
- Running time: 94 minutes
- Country: Japan

Nangoku no hada (南国の肌) (lit. 'The Skin of the South') is a 1952 black-and-white Japanese film directed by Ishirō Honda. The film is based on the story "Virginal Land of Flowers" by Seito Fukuda.

The film crew includes Akira Watanabe as art director, Kentaro Kondo as lightning technician, sound recordist Yoshio Nishikawa and director of photography Kiyoe Kawamura.

== Plot ==
In Kagoshima, the southernmost part of Kyushu, there are many special volcanic ash areas called "Shirasu", and we suffered from typhoons every year. Researchers at the Tokyo Labor Research Institute, Ohno and Takayama, were invited by a land development team to study how to transform this volcanic ash land into agricultural land. Sadae Miura is also a woman dispatched from the Tokyo headquarters to the labor insurance research institute of farmhousewives in this region, and these three people were working with enthusiasm. A malicious broker Nonaka came in there and tried to buy the forest above "Silas", but Ohno and others opposed the danger of the landslide and the survival of the village. However, Nonaka got it by bad means and started logging. Ohno and his colleagues advised the dangers of the village and encouraged the relocation of the village, but due to the feudal obstinacy of the elders in the village, it also failed. Sadae is encouraged to marry by his uncle in Fukuoka, but he is attracted to Ono's serious lifestyle attitude, and he knows that he is a prodigal son of a wealthy man who committed a daughter in the village of Keiko who was on a manner of apprenticeship. I changed it all over. Though Keiko was crazy, he still loved Ohno. The rain continued, and finally the day when Ono and others warned was coming. Takayama pushed his illness and eventually died in a rainy investigation. When the village was in danger of rising water and landslides, Ohno et al. showed that the damage was minimal and difficult. Onaka's gang who laughed at Ono and stayed in the mountains, but was in time for Ono at the risk of death, but fell victim to the landslide. Keiko was also caught up in the landslide after climbing Ohno. And this great fear and excitement brought together Ohno and Sadae.

== Release ==
Nangoku no hada was released theatrically in Japan by Toho on 28 February 1952.

== Bibliography ==
- Galbraith IV, Stuart (2008). The Toho Studios Story: A History and Complete Filmography. Scarecrow Press. ISBN 9781461673743.
