= Shoichi Hirose =

Japanese actor

Shōichi Hirose
- 広瀬 正一
- Hirose on the set of King Kong vs. Godzilla, 1962
- Born: June 23, 1918; Tokyo, Japan
- Died: March 4, 1990 (aged 71); Tokyo, Japan
- Occupation: Actor
- Years active: 1950–1988
- Known for: King Kong
- Notable work: King Kong vs. Godzilla (1962)
- Spouse: None

Shoichi Hirose (Japanese: 広瀬 正一, Hepburn: Hirose Shōichi; June 23, 1918 – March 4, 1990), occasionally miscredited as Masakazu Hirose and nicknamed Solomon (ソロモン, Soromon) for his survival in the naval Battle of the Eastern Solomons, was a Japanese actor. Hirose portrayed Godzilla's archenemy King Ghidorah and King Kong in King Kong vs. Godzilla, along with several "tough guy" roles.

== Career ==
In 1950, he started working at the Toho, where he played minor roles in films. Due to the popularity of the kaijū-eiga genre, he was interested in playing the monster in one of these films. This opportunity arose in 1962, when Eiji Tsuburaya offered him the role of King Kong in the emerging King Kong vs. Godzilla. Tsuburaya ordered Hirose to go to the zoo and study gorilla behavior in order to better play the role of a monster. In later years, Hirose confessed that he never went to the zoo and then lied to Tsuburaya, saying that he had gained a lot of experience during the alleged visit. Despite his enthusiasm for working with the special effects team, he had difficulty playing King Kong, because the zipper sewn into the costume (in order to hide it) forced him to stay in it for a long time: “Sweat was pouring out of me and even getting into my eyes. After I left [the costume] I was pale."

The next role in a kaijū-type movie was King Ghidorah in Ghidorah, the Three-Headed Monster in 1964, which he received after Haruya Sakamoto, who played him, quit due to his overweight suit. A year later he repeated the role in the Invasion of Astro-Monster. Equally, the film's special effects directors Koichi Kawakita and Teruyoshi Nakano, then assistants to the special effects operator, believed that King Ghidorah in Ghidorah, the Three-Headed Monster was played by Kōji Uruki, who also played Rodan. Kawakita was of the opinion that Hirose could not play Ghidorah due to his short stature.

Hirose was Eiji Tsuburaya's first choice for the role of Sanda in The War of the Gargantuas in 1966, however, he declined, preferring a role he was offered in another film where he could show his face.

In 1971, during the financial crisis that hit Japan, all actors contracted with Toho were restructured, and Hirose remained in the studio as a stage worker, where he worked until the 1990s. However, at the same time, he suffered from a herniated disc and was admitted to the Tokyo Labor Disaster Hospital in Tokyo. He died shortly after living in a nursing home.

== Filmography ==
=== Film ===
- 1952: Minato e kita otoko
- 1953: Hana no naka no musumetachi
- 1954: Zoku Take-chan shacho
- 1954: Seven Samurai - Bandit #2
- 1954: Tomei Ningen - Policeman
- 1955: Godzilla Raids Again - Convict
- 1955: Oen-san
- 1955: Half Human - Mountain Searcher
- 1955: Meoto zenzai
- 1955: Kaettekita wakadan'na
- 1956: Samurai III: Duel at Ganryu Island
- 1956: Ankokugai
- 1956: Onibi
- 1956: Hadashi no seishun
- 1956: Okashi-na yatsu - Daisuke's Friend
- 1956: Rodan - F-86F pilot (uncredited)
- 1957: Zoku Goyôkiki monogatari - Travelling salesman
- 1957: Ôban - The Man On The Train
- 1957: Salaryman shusse taikôki - Thief
- 1957: Ikiteiru Koheiji
- 1957: Tôhoku no zunmu-tachi
- 1957: Zokuzoku Ôban: Dotô hen - Tahei
- 1957: The Mysterians - Detective in Etsuko's house
- 1958: Yagyû bugeichô: Sôryû hiken
- 1958: Futari dake no hashi
- 1958: Yajikata dôchû sugoroku
- 1958: The H-Man - Fire department officer
- 1958: Varan the Unbelievable - Fisherman
- 1958: The Hidden Fortress - Yamana soldier
- 1959: Ankokugai no kaoyaku
- 1959: Monkey Sun
- 1959: Kitsune to tanuki
- 1959: Gigantis, the Fire Monster - Convict
- 1959: The Three Treasures
- 1959: Yari hitosuji nihon bare
- 1959: Bakushô Mito Kômon man'yûki - Gejimasa
- 1960: Boku wa dokushin shain
- 1960: Ginza taikutsu musume
- 1960: The Secret of the Telegian - Onishi's Henchman
- 1960: Man Against Man - Genpachi
- 1960: The Human Vapor - Doomed Burly Guard
- 1961: Nasake muyo no wana
- 1961: Yojimbo - Ushitora Follower
- 1961: Nakito gozansu
- 1961: Mothra - Dam Worker
- 1961: Arigataya sandogasa
- 1961: Witness Killed
- 1962: Sanjuro - Samurai on watch duty
- 1962: King Kong vs. Godzilla - King Kong
- 1962: Ankokugai no kiba
- 1963: Attack Squadron!
- 1963: Onna ni tsuyoku naru kufû no kazukazu - Detective
- 1963: Nippon jitsuwa jidai
- 1963: Chintao yôsai bakugeki meirei
- 1963: Kureji sakusen: Kudabare! Musekinin
- 1963: Atragon - Mu Henchman
- 1963: Honolulu, Tokio, Hong Kong - Shoe maker
- 1964: Kyô mo ware ôzora ni ari
- 1964: Nippon ichi no horafuki otoko
- 1964: Hadaka no jûyaku
- 1964: Dogora, the Space Monster - Diamond Truck Driver
- 1964: Horafuki taikôki
- 1964: Danchi: Nanatsu no taizai
- 1964: Hana no oedo no musekinin
- 1964: Ghidorah, the Three-Headed Monster - King Ghidorah
- 1965: Ankokugai gekitotsu sakusen - Man from Kyushu
- 1965: Red Beard - Thug
- 1965: Nippon ichi no goma suri otoko
- 1965: Taiheiyô kiseki no sakusen: Kisuka - Yamashita
- 1965: Umi no wakadaishô
- 1965: Frankenstein vs. Baragon - Tunnel Worker
- 1965: Crazy Adventure - Police officer
- 1965: Invasion of the Astro-Monster - King Ghidorah
- 1966: Bangkok no yoru
- 1966: The War of the Gargantuas - Soldier
- 1966: Kureji daisakusen
- 1966: Godzilla vs. the Sea Monster - Escaped Slave
- 1967: Kureji ogon sakusen
- 1967: King Kong Escapes - Henchman #7
- 1967: Bâkushoyarô daijiken - Kurokawa
- 1968: Nippon ichi no uragiri-otoko
- 1969: Nippon ichi no danzetsu otoko
- 1969: Mito Kômon man'yûki
- 1970: Nagurikomi Shimizu Minato
- 1970: Gekido no showashi 'Gunbatsu' - Hama (uncredited)
- 1970: Nippon ichi no warunori otoko
- 1971: Battle of Okinawa
- 1971: Nishi no petenshi Higashi no sagishi - Doya's Husband
- 1971: Nippon ichi no shokku otoko
- 1973: Lady Snowblood
- 1974: Kigeki damashi no jingi
- 1974: Lady Snowblood 2: Love Song of Vengeance
- 1974: Rupan Sansei: Nenriki chin sakusen - Museum Guard
- 1975: Terror of Mechagodzilla
- 1977: House - Ramen Trucker
- 1981: Kôfuku - (final film role)

=== Television ===
- 1966: Kaiju Booska
