= The Human Vapor =

1960 film by Ishirō Honda

- Theatrical release poster
- Directed by: Ishirō Honda
- Screenplay by: Takeshi Kimura
- Story by: John Meredyth Lucas
- Produced by: Tomoyuki Tanaka
- Starring: Yoshio Tsuchiya; Kaoru Yachigusa; Tatsuya Mihashi; Keiko Sata
- Cinematography: Hajime Koizumi
- Edited by: Kazuji Taira
- Music by: Kunio Miyauchi
- Production company: Toho
- Distributed by: Toho
- Release date: 11 December 1960 (Japan)
- Running time: 91 minutes
- Country: Japan
- Language: Japanese

The Human Vapor (ガス人間第一号 (Note: Although Daiichigō is written as 第1号 on Toho's official website, it is penned as 㐧一号 in the film's script, poster, and on Honda's website.), Gasu Ningen Daiichigō; lit. 'The First Gas Man') is a 1960 Japanese science fiction thriller film directed by Ishirō Honda, with special effects by Eiji Tsuburaya. Produced and distributed by Toho, it is the third and final film in the Transforming Human Series, after The H-Man (1958) and The Secret of the Telegian (1960). Yoshio Tsuchiya stars as the titular character, a man transformed into a gaseous being after a scientific experiment goes awry. Kaoru Yachigusa, Tatsuya Mihashi, and Keiko Sata appear in supporting roles. The story follows the vaporous antihero as he exploits his newfound powers to commit bank robberies, using the proceeds to finance the dancing career of his lover, Fujichiyo (Yachigusa), while evading Detective Okamoto (Mihashi) and facing his powers' moral toll.

Producer Tomoyuki Tanaka tasked screenwriter Takeshi Kimura with adapting a story by John Meredyth Lucas. Kimura crafted a suspenseful script reflecting 1960 Japan's unrest, including the Anpo protests and high-profile bank heists. Honda signed on after Toho canceled his planned aviation drama Today I Am in the Skies. Viewing the film as a modern shinjū tragedy in the tradition of Chikamatsu Monzaemon, he directed with intimate focus. Principal photography took place primarily at Toho studios, with exterior scenes filmed at the Bank of Japan headquarters and the National Diet Library. During post-production, Tsuburaya directed the special effects, using wire rigs, dry-ice vapor, and optical compositing.

The Human Vapor was released in Japan on December 11, 1960, to critical acclaim—a rare feat for a tokusatsu film at the time. The film also achieved both critical and commercial success in the United States and Europe, leading to plans for a sequel that was ultimately never materialized. Over time, its reputation has grown, earning cult classic status and praise as a standout early science-fiction thriller, noted for innovative special effects and themes of power and oppression. In 2009, it ranked 65th in Kinema Junpo's critics' poll of the 200 greatest Japanese films of all time. A stage adaptation premiered in Tokyo in the late 2000s, and a Toho-produced series based on the film was released on Netflix in 2026.

== Plot ==
While investigating a mysterious bank robbery, Detective Okamoto encounters Nihon-buyō dancer Fujichiyo Kasuga and her servant, Jiya. Okamoto's girlfriend, newspaper reporter Kyoko Kono, begins investigating the case as well. Shortly thereafter, another bank is robbed, with the culprit mysteriously evading all security measures, surviving gunfire from a police officer, and killing the officer and an employee before vanishing.

Kyoko informs Okamoto that Fujichiyo is the Iemoto of the Kasuga house of dance, which has fallen out of favor. He also learns from his superior Tabata that the bank victims died from asphyxiation. Okamoto and Kyoko discover that Fujichiyo is planning to perform again, but is reticent about the details. They follow her to a library, where the librarian Mizuno tells them that she has been studying Noh and Kabuki. Fujichiyo also approaches a former disciple of hers named Montayu, and offers him ¥200,000 to perform in spite of having a new head at Ningyocho. Okamoto reports these findings and his suspicion of her possible sponsor to Tabata, who recommends continuing to investigate Fujichiyo's dealings.

A copycat is arrested after making a call to Kyoko's newspaper, announcing the date and time of the next robbery, but being found at another bank. In spite of said apprehension, Okamoto still holds suspicions over Fujichiyo, which appear confirmed when she attempts to pay for a theater space with stolen money. She is arrested and questioned but refuses to say where the money came from.

Sometime later, Mizuno surrenders himself to the police and offers to show them how he committed the robberies. He is brought to the second bank he robbed, where he demonstrates his ability to turn himself into a gaseous form that allows him to evade gunfire, pass through vault bars, and asphyxiate two more people. Before he escapes through an overhead window, he demands Fujichiyo's release, but she still refuses to cooperate and is kept in police custody. Mizuno attempts a rescue, but she refuses to leave and be seen as a criminal herself. Mizuno instead releases the other prisoners, causing a clash with police.

Kyoko convinces her newspaper to print an invitation to Mizuno, who arrives at the designated time and place to be interviewed. He explains that a scientist named Dr. Sano experimented on him and caused his transformation. Mizuno then killed Dr. Sano in a rage, but is now grateful for his powers which allow him to be with Fujichiyo. The police arrive and attempt to subdue Mizuno, but he escapes once again.

The police are soon forced to release Fujichiyo, as they are unable to charge her. She proceeds with her performance plans despite the musicians' refusal to attend out of fear. Mizuno visits her and declares his love, saying he would do anything for her. Scientist Dr. Tamiya meets with Okamoto and Tabata to devise a plan to destroy Mizuno using explosive gas. Kyoko pleads with Fujichiyo to cancel the performance, but she refuses, feeling it is her destiny and expressing love for Mizuno.

On the night of the recital, as media and emergency crews observe the theater, a number of onlookers enter, demanding to see the "Human Vapor." Mizuno stands before them, announces that he is the Human Vapor, and transforms, scaring the crowd away. Fujichiyo and Jiya insist on continuing, and despite Kyoko's pleas, the switch is thrown to detonate the theater, but the circuit board has been sabotaged and the plan appears to be a failure. As the performance ends and Mizuno embraces Fujichiyo, she covertly pulls out a cigarette lighter and strikes it, destroying herself, Jiya (who chose to stay with her to the end), the theater, and Mizuno, who returns to solid form in death.

== Cast ==
- Yoshio Tsuchiya as Mizuno, a librarian who becomes the Human Vapor
- Tatsuya Mihashi as Detective Okamoto
- Kaoru Yachigusa as Fujichiyo Kasuga
- Keiko Sata as Kyoko Kono, Reporter
- Hisaya Ito as Dr. Tamiya
- Yoshifumi Tajima as Sergent Tabata
- Yoshio Kosugi as Detective Inao
- Fuyuki Murakami as Dr. Sano
- Bokuzen Hidari as Jiya, Fujichiyo's Attendant
- Takamaru Sasaki as Police Chief
- Minosuke Yamada as Hayama, Official
- Tatsuo Matsumura as Ikeda, Editor
- Ko Mishima as Fujita, Detective
- Kozo Nomura as Kawasaki, Kyoko's Fellow Reporter
- Ren Yamamoto as Nomura, Robber
- Somesho Matsumoto as Montayu
- Tetsu Nakamura as Tobe, Journalist
- Toki Shiozawa as Satoyo, Wife
- Kamayuki Tsubonoas Ozaki, Policeman
- Yasuhisa Tsutsumi as Bank Manager
- Akio Kusama, Yutaka Oka as Cops
- Yukihiko Gondo as Hotta, Guard
- Shoichi Hirose as a guard
- Wataru Omae, Hideo Shibuya as Audience Members
- Junpei Natsuki as Bystander
- Haruo Nakajima as a bank patron with black glasses (uncredited)

=== English dub ===
- James Hong as Mizuno
- Paul Frees
- Bill Idelson
- Virginia Gregg

== Production ==
=== Development ===
The Human Vapor marked the third and final installment in the Transforming Human trilogy at Toho, following The H-Man (1958) and The Secret of the Telegian (1960). The project originated when producer Tomoyuki Tanaka acquired a story outline by American screenwriter John Meredyth Lucas, best known for his work on Star Trek and earlier B-movies. Tanaka, aiming to continue Toho's cycle of compact, effects-driven thrillers, commissioned Takeshi Kimura—a leftist screenwriter with a reputation for politically charged narratives—to adapt Lucas's concept into an original screenplay.

Kimura's script deliberately reflected the turbulent socio-political climate of 1960 Japan. The Anpo protests—massive demonstrations against the revised U.S.–Japan Security Treaty—had paralyzed Tokyo in June, culminating in the cancellation of President Dwight D. Eisenhower's state visit and the resignation of Prime Minister Nobusuke Kishi. Concurrently, failed legislative efforts to restore wartime police powers, a 312-day miners' strike ending in riots, and a series of high-profile bank heists (inspired by the infamous 1948 Teigin case) dominated headlines. Kimura wove these elements into the narrative: the protagonist, Mizuno, is a disgruntled former pilot turned librarian, radicalized by institutional rejection and empowered by science to challenge authority.

Ishirō Honda joined the project under unusual circumstances. Initially attached to direct an aviation drama titled Today I Am in the Skies (今日も私は空にいる), Honda saw the film canceled by Toho executives. Simultaneously, Jun Fukuda—originally slated to helm The Human Vapor—departed for another assignment, prompting Tanaka to reassign Honda. Honda embraced the material, viewing it as a modern shinjū (double suicide) tragedy in the tradition of Chikamatsu Monzaemon, the 18th-century bunraku and kabuki playwright known for doomed love stories. He later stated: "My view of life is about purity, and that includes the relationship between a man and a woman... When their love is pure, and they are in the happiest time of life, they would kill themselves just to preserve that love." Honda directed with a deliberately restrained, character-centered approach, prioritizing psychological intimacy, moral ambiguity, and tragic inevitability over spectacle—a stark contrast to Toho's kaiju epics. The Human Vapor was Honda's sole directorial effort in 1960, marking the first time in nine years that he had only one film credit in a calendar year.

=== Filming ===
The majority of interior scenes were shot on Toho Studios soundstages in Tokyo. Exterior filming took place at two symbolically charged locations: the Bank of Japan headquarters in Chūō, Tokyo and the National Diet Library.

Cinematographer Hajime Koizumi employed low-angle tracking shots, chiaroscuro lighting, and canted angles—particularly in Dr. Sano's laboratory—to heighten psychological unease. Honda and Yoshio Tsuchiya (Mizuno) collaborated on a signature transformation gesture: the actor places his hand over his heart before dissolving, a subtle tic that became a visual motif. Tsuchiya recalled: "I asked Honda, ‘How should I disappear?'... He said, ‘Oh, that is really great!' and we ended up going with it."

Kaoru Yachigusa, returning from a brief acting hiatus after marrying director Senkichi Taniguchi, prepared rigorously for her role as Fujichiyo. A former Takarazuka Revue dancer, she practiced the film's centerpiece ballet sequence—titled Passion (jōki)—daily after filming, performing it in full on camera. She later described the role as physically and emotionally draining due to the need to maintain aristocratic poise in every scene.

=== Special effects ===
The special effects were directed by Eiji Tsuburaya and executed under a deliberately restrained aesthetic that prioritized narrative integration and psychological realism over spectacle. Unlike Toho's kaiju productions, which relied on large-scale miniatures and pyrotechnics, The Human Vapor used compact, practical, and optical techniques to depict the protagonist's transformation into a gaseous state and his ability to pass through solid objects. The effects were designed to support Honda's intimate, character-driven direction rather than dominate the frame.

To visualize the vapor form, Tsuburaya's team employed dry-ice fog, rotoscoping, fog elements optically added in, and, for one scene, a rubber costume of Tsuchiya. Dry ice (solid CO₂) sublimating into carbon dioxide gas created dense, low-lying mist that clung to the floor, simulating the protagonist's movement as a creeping, intangible cloud.

The prison entrance sequence where Mizuno slips between cell bars was achieved through optical effects, dry-ice, and a dissolve.

=== Music ===
The score was composed by Kunio Miyauchi. Miyauchi received no specific instructions from Honda or Tsuburaya, instead holding discussions with assistant director Koji Kajita. Several background music cues from the film were later reused in the television series Ultra Q and Ultraman, both also scored by Miyauchi. The 1991 soundtrack album Ultraman: Complete Music Collection includes, as bonus tracks, the entire Human Vapor score—including unused cues—and features liner notes with film data, commentary, and a track list, effectively serving as the first official soundtrack release for the film.

== Release ==
The film was distributed in Japan by Toho on December 11, 1960. It was later released in the United States as The Human Vapor by Brenco Pictures in an English-language dub. This version premiered on November 27, 1963, and was given a roadshow theatrical release in May 1964. This heavily altered cut moved the revelation of Mizuno's powers to the beginning of the film and re-framed the ending, with Mizuno explaining in voice-over that he survived the explosion but must live with the weight of Fujichiyo's loss forever. The film was released as a double feature with Gorath, and was edited down to 79 minutes.

== Reception ==
In a contemporary review, "Whit." of Variety declared the film plot superior to its companion double feature Gorath and that its special effects by Eiji Tsuburaya were "expert", while the acting was "competent". The review concluded that the English-language dub they watched was "far from gratifying" and that when the lips did not match the English dialogue, it "decreased realism".

== Unproduced sequel ==
Due to its box office success in the United States and Europe, an American film company proposed that Toho produce a sequel to the film. In February 1963, Shinichi Sekizawa wrote the first draft for the sequel, entitled Frankenstein vs. the Gas Man (フランケンシュタイン対ガス人間, Furankenshutain tai Gasu Ningen). According to producer Tomoyuki Tanaka the film was to depict "the gas man looking for Dr. Frankenstein in order to revive Fujichiyo". A depiction of Frankenstein's monster was later used in Frankenstein vs. Baragon (1965).

== Adaptations ==
A stage adaptation of the film premiered in Tokyo in the late 2000s. It starred Kumi Mizuno and Ataru Nakamura, and was broadcast on NHK Educational TV on February 26, 2010.

In 2024, a Japanese-South Korean series adaptation of the film was announced by Netflix. Co-produced by Toho Studios and Wow Point, Yeon Sang-ho served as showrunner and writer with Shinzo Katayama served as director for the series, with Yu Aoi and Shun Oguri in starring roles. It is currently set for a 2026 release.

== See also ==
- 4D Man
