= Destroy All Monsters =

1968 Japanese film directed by Ishirō Honda

- Theatrical release poster

Japanese name
- Kanji: 怪獣総進撃
Transcriptions
- Revised Hepburn: kaijuu sou shingeki
- Directed by: Ishirō Honda
- Special effects by: Sadamasa Arikawa
- Screenplay by: Takeshi Kimura; Ishirō Honda
- Produced by: Tomoyuki Tanaka
- Starring: Akira Kubo; Jun Tazaki; Yoshio Tsuchiya
- Cinematography: Taiichi Kankura
- Edited by: Ryohei Fujii
- Music by: Akira Ifukube
- Production company: Toho Co., Ltd
- Distributed by: Toho
- Release date: August 1, 1968 (Japan)
- Running time: 88 minutes
- Country: Japan
- Language: Japanese
- Budget: ¥200,000,000 (equivalent to ¥794,077,735 in 2024)
- Box office: ¥170,000,000 (equivalent to ¥674,966,075 in 2024) (Japan rentals)

Destroy All Monsters (Japanese: 怪獣総進撃, Hepburn: Kaijū Sō-shingeki; lit. 'Monster All-Out Attack') is a 1968 Japanese epic kaiju film directed by Ishirō Honda, with special effects directed by Sadamasa Arikawa and supervised by Eiji Tsuburaya. Produced and distributed by Toho Co., Ltd, it is the ninth film in the Godzilla franchise, and stars Akira Kubo, Jun Tazaki, Yukiko Kobayashi and Yoshio Tsuchiya. In the film, a race of malevolent aliens called the "Kilaaks" release giant monsters across the world, forcing authorities to investigate their potential weaknesses and regain control of the monsters.

Destroy All Monsters was released theatrically in Japan on August 1, 1968. The film was released by American International Pictures with an English-language dub in the United States on May 23, 1969. Contemporary American reviews were mixed, with praise mainly held for the climactic monster battle. Retrospectively, the film has received more praise.

The film was followed by All Monsters Attack, released on December 20, 1969.

== Plot ==
At the end of the 20th century (Note: 1999 in English dubs), all of the Earth's giant monsters have been collected by the United Nations Science Committee (UNSC) and confined in an area known as Monsterland, located in the Ogasawara island chain. A special control center is constructed underneath the island to ensure that the monsters stay secure and to serve as a research facility to study them.

When communications with Monsterland are suddenly and mysteriously severed, and all of the monsters begin attacking world cities, Dr. Yoshida of the UNSC orders captain Katsuo Yamabe and the crew of his spaceship, Moonlight SY-3, to investigate Monsterland. There, they discover that the scientists, led by Dr. Otani, have become mind-controlled slaves of a feminine extraterrestrial race identifying themselves as the Kilaaks, who reveal that they are in control of the monsters. Their leader demands that the human race surrender, or face total annihilation.

Godzilla attacks New York City, Rodan attacks Moscow, Mothra attacks Beijing, Gorosaurus attacks Paris (Note: Although Baragon was credited for its destruction), and Manda attacks London. The attacks were set in to motion to draw attention away from Japan, so that the Kilaaks can establish an underground stronghold near Mount Fuji. The Kilaaks then turn their next major attack onto Tokyo and, without serious opposition, become arrogant in their aims until the UNSC discover, after recovering the Kilaaks' monster mind-control devices from around the world, that they have switched to broadcasting the control signals from their base under the Moon's surface. In a desperate battle, the crew of the SY-3 destroys the Kilaak's lunar outpost and returns the Kilaak control system to Earth.

With all of the monsters under the control of the UNSC, the Kilaaks call King Ghidorah, who is dispatched to protect the Kilaak stronghold, battling Godzilla, Minilla, Mothra, Rodan, Manda, Gorosaurus, Anguirus, Kumonga, Baragon and Varan. While seemingly invincible, Ghidorah is eventually overpowered by the combined strength of the Earth monsters and is killed. Refusing to admit defeat, the Kilaaks produce their ace, a burning monster they call the Fire Dragon, which begins to torch Tokyo and destroys the control center on Ogasawara.

Suddenly, Godzilla attacks and destroys the Kilaaks' underground base, revealing that the Earth's monsters instinctively know who their enemies are. Yamabe then pursues the Fire Dragon in the SY-3 and narrowly achieves victory for the human race. The Fire Dragon is revealed to be a flaming Kilaak UFO and is destroyed. With the Kilaaks defeated, Godzilla and the other monsters eventually return to Monsterland to live in peace.

== Cast ==
- Akira Kubo as Captain Katsuo Yamabe
- Jun Tazaki as Dr. Yoshida
- Yukiko Kobayashi as Kyoko Manabe
- Yoshio Tsuchiya as Dr. Otani
- Andrew Hughes as Dr. Stevenson
- Kyoko Ai as the Queen of the Kilaaks
- Kenji Sahara as Nishikawa, Moon Base Commander
- Chotaro Togin as Moonlight SY-3 Astronaut Ogata
- Seishiro Kuno as Moonlight SY-3 Astronaut Tani
- Wataru Omae as Moonlight SY-3 Astronaut Arima
- Yasuhiko Saijô as Moonlight SY-3 Astronaut Fujita
- Naoya Kusakawa as Moonlight SY-3 Astronaut
- Yoshibumi Tajima as General Sugiyama Tada
- Kazuo Suzuki as Controlled Monsterland Personnel
- Toru Ibuki as Controlled Monsterland Personnel Tetsuo Ise
- Susumu Kurobe as Controlled Monsterland Personnel Shin Kuroiwa
- Minoru Ito as Controlled Monsterland Personnel Minoru Kudo
- Nadao Kirino, Yutaka Oka, Kamayuki Tsubono as Special Police Force
- Ikio Sawamura as a farmer with rocks
- Haruo Nakajima as Godzilla
- Hiroshi Sekita as Anguirus and Gorosaurus
  - Tadaaki Watanabe as the stunts of Anguirus
- Masao Fukazawa as Minilla
- Teruoshi Nigaki as Rodan
- Susumu Utsumi as King Ghidorah

== Production ==
=== Writing ===
Special effects director Sadamasa Arikawa noted that Toho were going to potentially end the Godzilla series as Producer Tomoyuki Tanaka "figured that all the ideas had just run out." Several sources attest that the film was announced alongside Son of Godzilla, possibly as a competing project.

The film was written by Takeshi Kimura and Ishirō Honda, making it the first Godzilla film since Godzilla Raids Again not written by Shinichi Sekizawa. Takeshi Kimura is credited by his pen name Kaoru Mabuchi in the film's credits. Kimura and Honda's script developed the concept of Monsterland (referred to as Monster Island in future films).

The earliest screenplay, written by Kimura in 1967, was titled Monster Chushingura (怪獣忠臣蔵, Kaiju Chūshingura); the word chushingura refers to a famous historical story in Japan about the rebellion of 47 samurai who took revenge after their master was unjustly forced to commit suicide. Supposedly, in this version, every monster in Toho's arsenal was to be included, even King Kong and Sanda and Gaira from The War of the Gargantuas. In an interview with David Miller, Honda even said "the original idea was to show all of the monsters."

The first initial screenplay, preliminary titled Monster Total Advancement Order (怪獣総進撃命令, Kaijū Sōshingeki Meirei), by Kamura (as Kaoru Mabuchi) was submitted on November 22, 1967, and included a confirmed roster of Godzilla, Mothra (larva), King Ghidorah, Rodan, Baragon, Varan, Kumonga, Manda, Maguma and Ebirah. Everything plays out just as in the finished film except that Maguma and Baragon guard the Kilaak base and Baragon actually attacks Paris. Also, in this iteration, Varan and Rodan work in tandem to attack Ghidorah in the final battle. Also in this iteration, Baragon, Maguma and Gaira were the "Watch-Dogs of the Kilaak base". However, the Baragon and Maguma suits were in bad condition for the scene and they were replaced with Godzilla and Anguirus.

When it was decided to adapt Two Godzillas!: Japan SOS (an earlier version of Son of Godzilla) instead, the script was shelved for next year. By then the rights to Kong had expired. Honda also wanted to show lunar colonies and brand new hybrid monsters, the results of interbreeding and genetic splicing. He planned to delve more deeply into undersea farming to feed the monsters, but because of budget constraints this was not included. In later scripts, the number of monsters was cut as well.

=== Filming ===
Director Honda was fascinated by the concept of a "monster farm", in particular the idea of how humanity could feed them. He noted that a "huge amount of protein" would be needed and envisioned cloning along with undersea farming to accomplish this. However, despite the director's fascination with this concept, the final movie devotes very little time to it outside of the brief introduction to Monsterland and showing Rodan feasting on a dolphin. The director laments that of the original complex idea only the basic "idea of [a] Monster Island survived."

As the film has several monsters who continuously return in the films, the location was developed to be a faraway island where the monsters are pacified. This tied other films not related to the Godzilla series within its universe, as creatures such as Manda (from Atragon) and Varan (Varan the Unbelievable) exist. The film features footage from Ghidorah, the Three-Headed Monster (1964), specifically King Ghidorah's fiery birth scene.

As with Ebirah, Horror of the Deep, Teisho Arikawa was the actual special effects director for the movie, although Eiji Tsuburaya is credited for it. Tsuburaya had more of a supervisor role regarding the special effects. During the monster's attack on Tokyo, Godzilla can be seen stepping over a construction crane model. Godzilla actor Haruo Nakajima claimed to have done so because he worried he might trip over it and fall. He later said he regretted doing that, feeling it was a very non-monster like thing to do and that he should have simply kicked it out of the way.

School children visiting the set during production, posing with some of the cast, monster suits and props.

During the movie's production, Toho arranged for a visit to the Mount Fuji set by a group of around 100 kids who were entering first grade, who got to see all the monsters in action, as well as actors Akira Kubo and Jun Tazaki. Actress Yukiko Kobayashi, as well as the monsters, also paid a visit to a member of the child actors cast in an Imperial Theater of London production of Oliver! in Tokyo.

At the climactic battle at Mount Fuji, Haruo Nakajima wanted Godzilla to reprise his "jumping shie" from Invasion of Astro-Monster but Ishirō Honda removed it from the final film.

=== Special effects ===
New monster suits for Godzilla and Anguirus were constructed for the film, while Rodan, Kumonga, Minilla, Gorosaurus, Manda, Baragon, Mothra and King Ghidorah suits were modified from previous films, with Ghidorah having less detail than he had in previous films.

There were 3 different scales of the Moonlight SY-3 created or the film. The largest was 1 meter (3 feet) long mainly used for shots of the spaceship flying across the surface of the Moon, landing and taking off, and for battle with the Fire Dragon (UFO). The core of the model was solid wood with surface details made of balsa wood and molded fiber glass with putty and paint used to disguise the wood grain and the seams. This model had collapsible wings, functional landing gear and fully firing engines. A 50 cm version was made for use for the booster stage and a 30 cm version was made for perspective flying shots. Both smaller versions were made of balsa wood covered in putty and paint.

For the scene when Gorosaurus comes out of the ground (through a tunnel presumably dug by Baragon) under the Arc de Triomphe, the floor of the set was six and half feet above the ground with the arc built on top of it. A forklift was brought in under the set and the monster was put on the forklift. They then raised the monster up through the ground by raising the forklift. The fire trap set by the Kilaaks to trap the Moonlight SY-3 used real flamethrowers. Fire retardant materials were used in the rock walls in the crater.

=== Deleted scene ===
After attacking New York, Godzilla was to arrive in London and fight Manda but the scene was cut. The scene was included in the 1990s bonus features of the film's Japanese LaserDisc. Director Ishirô Honda said about it, "Why was the scene is cut? Because it doesn't makes sense storywise. Godzilla and Manda were being mind-controlled by the same villains, they wouldn't just start fighting each other."

== Release ==
=== Box office ===
Destroy All Monsters was released in Japan on 1 August 1968 where it was distributed by Toho. It was released on a double bill with a reissue of the film Atragon. The film had a budget of roughly ¥200,000,000 and received an attendance of 2,580,000. The film was reissued theatrically in Japan in 1972 where it was re-edited by Honda to a 74-minute running time and released with the title Godzilla: Lightning Fast Strategy (ゴジラ電撃大作戦, Gojira Dengeki Daisakusen). Destroy All Monsters continued the decline in ticket sales in Japan for the Godzilla series, earning 2.6 million in ticket sales. In comparison, Invasion of Astro-Monster brought in 3.8 million and Son of Godzilla collected 2.5 million.

=== US release ===
The film was released in the United States by American International Pictures with an English-language dub on 23 May 1969. The film premiered in the United States in Cincinnati. American International Pictures hired Titra Studios to dub the film into English. The American version of the film remains relatively close to the Japanese original. Among the more notable removed elements include Akira Ifukube's title theme (the credits are moved to the end of the film) and a brief shot of Minilla shielding his eyes and ducking when King Ghidorah drops Anguirus from the sky. Destroy All Monsters was shown on American television until the early 1980s. It resurfaced on cable broadcast on the Sci-Fi Channel in 1996.

=== Home media ===
The AIP release of Destroy All Monsters was never released on home video in the United States, despite Orion Home Video at one point having distribution rights. It was finally released on VHS by ADV Films in 1998 which featured English-dubbed dialogue from Toho's own international version of the film. In 2011, Tokyo Shock released the film on DVD and Blu-ray and in 2014 the company re-released it on DVD and Blu-ray. In 2019, the Japanese version and export English version were included in a Blu-ray box set released by the Criterion Collection for North America and the United Kingdom, which included all 15 films from the franchise's Shōwa era.

In 2021, Toho premiered a 4K remaster of the film on the Nippon Classic Movie Channel, along with seven other Godzilla films also remastered in 4K. The film was downscaled to 2K for broadcast. This remaster was then released on UHD disc and Blu-ray in Japan during November 2023.

=== Critical response ===
From contemporary reviews, both Variety and Monthly Film Bulletin noted the film's best scenes involved the monsters together, while criticizing the filmmaking. Variety reviewed the English-dubbed version of the film stating that it may appeal to "Sci-fi addicts and monster fans" while stating that the "plot is on comic strip level, special effects depend on obvious miniatures and acting (human) is from school of Flash Gordon" and that the film's strength relied on its "monster rally". The Monthly Film Bulletin opined that "the model work is poor, and as usual the script is junior comic-strip". Both reviews mentioned the monsters' final scene with Variety commenting that it was "clever" and the Monthly Film Bulletin stating that "apart from [the monsters] statutory devastation of world capitals ... the monsters have disappointingly little to do until they get together in the last reel for a splendid battle" The Monthly Film Bulletin commented that the film was "almost worth sitting through the banalities for the final confrontation on Mount Fuji" noting Minilla, the son of Godzilla "endearingly applauding from a safe distance" and "the victorious monsters performing a celebratory jig".

From retrospective reviews, Steve Biodrowski of Cinefantastique commented that the film "is too slim in its storyline, too thin in its characterizations, to be considered a truly great film ... But for the ten-year-old living inside us all, it is entertainment of the most awesome sort." Matt Paprocki of Blogcritics said the film is "far from perfect" and "can be downright boring at times" but felt that "the destruction scenes make up for everything else" and "the final battle is an epic that simply can't be matched".

The film is considered a cult favorite among fans of the Godzilla franchise. In Steve Ryfle and Ed Godziszewski's 2017 book covering Ishirō Honda's filmography, they expressed that Destroy All Monsters is now seen as the "last truly spirited entry" in Toho's initial series of kaiju films, due to "its audacious and simple story, a bounty of monsters and destruction, and a memorably booming soundtrack from Akira Ifukube".

On the review aggregator website Rotten Tomatoes, 82% of 11 critics' reviews are positive, with an average rating of 6.6/10.

== See also ==
- List of films featuring dinosaurs
- List of Japanese films of 1968
- List of science fiction films of the 1960s
- Invasion of Astro-Monster
- Godzilla: Final Wars
