= Yoshifumi Tajima =

- Born: August 4, 1918; Tarumi-ku, Kobe Japan
- Died: September 10, 2009 (aged 91)
- Occupation: Actor

Yoshifumi Tajima (田島義文, Tajima Yoshifumi; 4 August 1918 - 10 September 2009) was a Japanese actor in film and television. A versatile actor best known for starring in numerous science fiction films produced by Toho Studios. His most iconic role is Kumayama, the greedy land developer in 1964's Mothra vs. Godzilla.

== Selected filmography ==
- Pu-san (1953)
- Hiroba no kodoku (1953) - Tachikawa
- Waseda daigaku (1953) - Detective
- Mitsuyu-sen (1954) - Soga
- Otsukisama ni wa warui kedo (1954)
- Ore no kenjû wa subayai (1954)
- Tenka taihei (1955)
- Ai no onimotsu (1955)
- Shônen shikeishû (1955)
- Ôkami (1955)
- Samurai II: Duel at Ichijoji Temple (1955) - Yoshioka samurai
- Yakan chûgaku (1955)
- Aijô (1956) - Tamura
- Shujinsen (1956)
- Rodan (1956) - Izeki, reporter of Seibu Nippou
- Kono futari ni sachi are (1957)
- Ninjitsu (1957)
- Zoku Ôban: Fûun hen (1957) - Yamaka
- Saigo no dasso (1957) - Chin
- Hadairo no tsuki (1957) - Jimbo
- Datsugokushû (1957)
- Zoku aoi sanmyaku Yukiko no maki (1957)
- The H-Man (1958) - Detective Sakata
- Doji o numana (1958)
- Varan the Unbelievable (1958) - Captain Maritime, Self-Defense Force
- Mikkokusha wa dare ka (1958) - Komakichi
- Jinsei gekijô - Seishun hen (1958)
- The Hidden Fortress (1958) - Potential slave buyer
- Kotan no kuchibue (1959)
- Aru kengo no shogai (1959)
- Sengoku gunto-den (1959) - Jiro's Vassal
- Aruhi watashi wa (1959) - Kitamura
- The Three Treasures (1959)
- When a Woman Ascends the Stairs (1960)
- Secret of the Telegian (1960) - Syôgen Ryû - Cabaret Owner
- Hawai Middowei daikaikûsen: Taiheiyô no arashi (1960)
- Salary man Mejiro Sanpei: Teishu no tameiki no maki (1960) - Shibata
- Fundoshi isha (1960) - Seibei
- Man Against Man (1960) - Taro
- The Bad Sleep Well (1960) - Reporter B
- Dokuritsu gurentai nishi-e (1960)
- Oneechan wa tsuiteru ze (1960) - Kurosuke Harano
- The Human Vapor (1960) - Sergeant
- Mothra (1961) - Military Advisor
- Kurenai no umi (1961)
- Ankokugai gekimetsu meirei (1961) - Tagami
- Kurenai no sora (1962)
- Doburoku no Tatsu (1962) - Numajiri
- King Kong vs. Godzilla (1962) - Captain of Fujita's Ship - Japanese version only
- Chūshingura: Hana no Maki, Yuki no Maki (1962) - Shuzen Wakisaka
- Attack Squadron! (1963) - Sailor
- High and Low (1963) - Chief Prison Officer
- Sengoku yarô (1963)
- Legacy of the 500,000 (1963) - Yasumoto
- Hiken (1963)
- Norainu sakusen (1963)
- Oneechan sandai-ki (1963) - Kawakami
- Atragon (1963) - Tome 'Amano' Amanoshome
- Mothra vs. Godzilla (1964) - Kumayama
- Nippon ichi no horafuki otoko (1964) - Coach
- Dogara, the Space Monster (1964) - Gangster Tada
- Hana no oedo no musekinin (1964)
- Ghidorah, the Three-Headed Monster (1964) - Ship Captain
- Samurai Assassin (1965) - Samurai
- Ankokugai gekitotsu sakusen (1965) - Cop
- Hi no ataru isu (1965) - Tanaami
- Tameki no taisho (1965) - Ishida
- Frankenstein vs. Baragon (1965) - Submarine Commander Murata
- Invasion of Astro-Monster (1965) - General
- Rise Against the Sword (1966) - Shozaemon Ube
- Hikinige (1966)
- Ultra Q (1966-1967, TV Series) - Daily News Editor Seki
- The War of the Gargantuas (1966) - Police Officer
- Retsu go! Wakadaishô (1967)
- Râkugoyarô-Daibakushô (1967) - Jurozaemon Mizuno
- Zoku izuko e (1967) - Assistant Schoolmaster
- King Kong Escapes (1967) - Henchman
- Japan's Longest Day (1967) - Colonel Watanabe - CO Imperial Guards 1st Infantry Regiment
- Scattered Clouds (1967)
- Kimi ni shiawase o - Sentimental boy (1967) - Momoo Maura
- Destroy All Monsters (1968) - Major Tada
- Isoroku (1968) - Air Force officer
- Kureji no buchamukure daihakken (1969)
- Battle of the Japan Sea (1969) - Ijichi
- Konto 55go: Jinrui no daijakuten (1969)
- All Monsters Attack (1969) - Detective
- The Militarists (1970) - Seiichi Itō
- Batsugun joshikôsei: 16 sai wa kanjichau (1970) - Ôta
- Showa hito keta shachô tai futaketa shain (1971)
- Ningen kakumei (1973)
- The Bullet Train (1975) - Sasaki
- Zoku ningen kakumei (1976)
- Nippon no Don: Yabohen (1977)
- The Return of Godzilla (1984) - Environmental Director General Hidaka
- Godzilla 1985 (1985) - Environmental Director General Hidaka (final film role)

== Television Roles ==
- Kamen Rider V3 (1973-1974) - Tadokoro
- Kamen Rider Stronger (1975) - Dr. Todoroki
- Himitsu Sentai Gorenger (1975 - Mayor (one episode)
