= Human Vapor =

2026 Japanese-South Korean television series

- Promotional poster
- Japanese: ガス人間
- Literal meaning: Gas Man
- Hangul: 가스인간
- RR: Gaseu ingan
- MR: Kasŭ in'gan
- Genre: Science fiction; Thriller; Crime drama
- Based on: The Human Vapor by: Ishirō Honda; Takeshi Kimura
- Showrunner: Yeon Sang-ho
- Written by: Yeon Sang-ho; Ryu Yong-jae
- Directed by: Shinzo Katayama
- Starring: Shun Oguri; Yū Aoi; Suzu Hirose; Kento Hayashi; Uta; Yutaka Takenouchi
- Music by: Takashi Ohmama
- Countries of origin: Japan; South Korea
- Original language: Japanese
- No. of episodes: 8

Production
- Executive producers: Yeon Sang-ho; Minami Ichikawa; Keiji Ota; Hisashi Usui; Yoshihiro Sato; Nen Hyo; Ryoji Kure
- Producers: Sokichi Onoda; Yang Yoomin Hailey
- Cinematography: Naoya Ikeda
- Editor: Hazuki Kataoka
- Production companies: Toho Studios; Wow Point

Original release
- Network: Netflix
- Release: July 2, 2026

Human Vapor (Japanese: ガス人間; Korean: 가스인간) is a 2026 science fiction crime thriller television series based on the 1960 tokusatsu film The Human Vapor by Ishirō Honda and Takeshi Kimura. A Japanese–South Korean co-production written by Yeon Sang-ho and Ryu Yong-jae and directed by Shinzo Katayama, the series stars Shun Oguri, Yu Aoi, Suzu Hirose, Kento Hayashi, Uta, and Yutaka Takenouchi. It is produced by Toho Studios and Wow Point, marking the first collaboration between Netflix and Toho, and was released on Netflix on July 2, 2026.

== Premise ==
A mysterious man who can turn into a gaseous form appears and calls himself "the Human Vapor". The Human Vapor kills a professor on live television and announces that he intends to kill everyone involved with an organization called "the White Center". Detective Kenji Okamoto is tasked with investigating the murders. Meanwhile, Kenji's ex-girlfriend Kyoko Kono runs her own investigation into the White Room's connection with a meteorite crash 27 years in the past and the cleanup of the contaminated crash site. Kyoko and Kenji find themselves crossing paths during their investigations as they unravel the conspiracy.

== Cast and characters ==
- Shun Oguri as Kenji Okamoto, a police detective who was suspended for allowing his former love interest and reporter, Kyoko access to case documents. His suspension was lifted by the Superintendent General in order to investigate brutal murder on live television program case caused by the Human Vapor, later leads him uncover hidden crimes and conspiracies involving the yakuza, the police and the government.
- Yū Aoi as Kyoko Kono, a reporter and Kenji's former love interest who received a promotion after reporting on a story using his case files. After witnessing a brutal murder on stage, she joins with Kenji in pursuing the truth.
- Suzu Hirose as Kaho Fujikawa and Kento Hayashi as Fujita Fujikawa, a pair of sibling livestreamers who run a horror and urban-myth webseries titled "Fujita and Kaho's Terror Zone". Only Fujita appears onscreen during their livestreams, as Kaho is insecure about a birthmark which covers half of her face. Their streams regularly attract only a handful of viewers, much to Fujita's frustrations.
- Uta as Ren Tsutsumida, the Human Vapor. One of many victims of the White Center's experiments, he vanished for a long time before resurfacing to exact revenge.
- Yutaka Takenouchi as Yasutoshi Mori, a former yakuza member turned company president, and one of the leaders of the White Center.

== Episodes ==
No.	Title	Directed by	Written by	Original release date
1	"The Interview"; Transliteration: "Intabyū" (Japanese: インタビュー)	Shinzo Katayama	Yeon Sang-ho & Ryu Yong-Jae	July 2, 2026
A mysterious gaseous entity enters a professor, Sano, causing him to explode on live television, leaving the public in terror. Detective Kenji Okamoto and reporter Kyoko Kono are independently assigned to investigate his death. They are ex-lovers, and Kenji is still bitter that Kyoko failed to appear at his engagement proposal and broke up with him. He was also suspended from the police force after Kyoko aired a special investigative report on Yasutoshi Mori, an ex-yakuza turned businessman, who was suspected of killing a teenage girl by making her overdose on drugs, which led to his "suicide"; his superiors believe his negligence allowed her access to the files. Later, a mysterious man who can transform into a gaseous form takes credit for the murder and calls himself "the Human Vapor". During an interview with Kyoko and her news crew in an abandoned restaurant, Bunko Ramen, the Human Vapor vows to kill everyone involved with something called "the White Center", later escaping after Kenji and SWAT police fail to capture him alive.
2	"Informant"; Transliteration: "Jōhō Teikyōsha" (Japanese: 情報提供者)	Shinzo Katayama	Yeon Sang-Ho & Ryu Yong-Jae	July 2, 2026
Kyoko and her crew learns that the White Center used homeless people and orphans for forced labor under the guise of being a welfare facility. The White Center was involved with the cleanup of a meteorite crash site 27 years ago and the murdered professor was the head of the safety committee which covered up the toxic nature of the site. Kyoko tracks down the former director of the White Center, Hiroki Obata, and convinces him to agree to hand over his journal detailing what transpired. While looking through the journal, Obata realizes that the Human Vapor was a cleanup crew member who was listed as missing. Meanwhile, Kenji discovers a clue that a yakuza gang might be the next target. The yakuza send an assassin that kills Obata and steals the journal before he can give it to Kyoko.
3	"The Journal"; Transliteration: "Nisshi" (Japanese: 日誌)	Shinzo Katayama	Yeon Sang-Ho & Ryu Yong-Jae	July 2, 2026
The yakuza obtain a video recording of the journal's contents from their assassin and use it to blackmail another involved party known as "Mufu". The assassin burns the journal and is then murdered by Kenji's corrupt coworker, Inspector Yoshida, who is a double agent working for both the yakuza and Mufu. Kenji prepares a police raid on the yakuza stronghold, while Kyoko and her news team surveil them. The Human Vapor "accidentally" appears at night just before the police raid, make chaos and chases the yakuza boss, Otomo, through the streets. After the Human Vapor kills him, Kyoko arrives at the scene, stealing Otomo's phone and sending the video recording to herself before the police arrive.
4	"Terror Zone"; Transliteration: "Kyōfu Chitai" (Japanese: 恐怖地帯)	Shinzo Katayama	Yeon Sang-Ho & Ryu Yong-Jae	July 2, 2026
Siblings Fujita and Kaho Fujikawa run an unsuccessful livestreaming channel called "The Terror Zone". They discover a clue to the Human Vapor's origins in the background of an old underground idol group's music video. A viewer of their stream, "dadashow", offers to buy the information off them for ¥1 million. Spurred by the offer, they investigate further and discover the resting place of the Human Vapor in the basement of an abandoned workshop. They find the Human Vapor as a frozen statue that comes to life upon hearing a specific song recording and learn that "dadashow" is actually Kyoko.
5	"Bunko Ramen"; Transliteration: "Bunko Rāmen" (Japanese: ブンコラーメン)	Shinzo Katayama	Yeon Sang-Ho & Ryu Yong-Jae	July 2, 2026
Kyoko reveals to the siblings that she was an orphan at the White Center when the meteor cleanup occurred. She inadvertently escaped the White Center after discovering the dead bodies of the cleanup crew. She controls the Human Vapor, remotely giving him targets to kill. However, she does not understand the full conspiracy; her investigation served to identify other members of Mufu. She lets the siblings go, urging them to only go public after she has taken her revenge. Kaho abhors the murders, while Fujita, desperate to become successful and lift them out of poverty, sneaks back to the Human Vapor and uses him to film another message, this time threatening the Superintendent General Mamoru Sakamoto of the Tokyo Metropolitan Police with death if he does not admit to his crimes. Kyoko and Kenji visit Sakamoto, who was listed in the journal. He claims that the actions of the White Center were for the greater good, saving many more lives than were killed by the meteorite cleanup. His guilt leads him to organize a press conference, to give up the last member of the conspiracy, only known as Kai, and everything else he knows. He also claims he was responsible for the death of Kenji's father, but refuses to elaborate. Before he can go into public, corrupt Inspector Yoshida, who still working for Mufu, kills him and stages it to look like suicide in his private car. He then sends the yakuza to the Fujikawa siblings as Fujita's video goes viral.
6	"Mufu"; Transliteration: "Mufu" (Japanese: 無風)	Shinzo Katayama	Yeon Sang-Ho & Ryu Yong-Jae	July 2, 2026
A flashback shows how Ren Tsutsumida, the man who became the Human Vapor, was one of many victims forced by the White Institute to attempt to destroy the meteorite. He successfully plants explosives that bury the meteorite, but in the process, he is exposed to enough of its anomalous energy to become the Human Vapor, later vanishing for years. The yakuza abduct both of the Fujikawa siblings in order to find out how they received the Human Vapor message. Kyoko reveals the connection between Sakamoto, the Center, and Mufu to his widow. She reveals that Mufu is actually the name of a band that Sakamoto started in high school, with Otomo (the yakuza boss) and the mysterious Kai, who is actually politician Takeshi Miura, one of the candidates running for governor of Tokyo. Despairing, she sends the order to the Human Vapor, but his awakening is interrupted by the yakuza, working for Miura. Miura has learned how to control the Human Vapor after torturing Fujita, and orders him to kill the siblings as they flee. Fujita sacrifices himself, dousing himself in gasoline before setting himself alight as the Human Vapor enters him, allowing Kaho to escape. Kenji investigates his father's belongings and finds that he was investigating the White Center before he died in an accident. He then searches through police records and finds that Otomo's lieutenant Mori was arrested for an assault at Bunko Ramen, the same restaurant the Human Vapor chose to be interviewed in. A polaroid on the wall reveals Ren with a young Kyoko. She confesses to Kenji, but they instead go on the run as the Tokyo Metropolitan Police put out a warrant for her arrest.
7	"Ellie My Love"	Shinzo Katayama	Yeon Sang-Ho & Ryu Yong-Jae	July 2, 2026
Governor Miura calls an emergency press conference, labelling Kyoko as the Human Vapor's accomplice. He plans to use the Human Vapor to sow terror, so that voters will choose his promises of stability over his challenger. Kyoko reveals to Kenji that after her escape from the Center, Ren adopted her. At Bunko Ramen, Kyoko's mother and her boyfriend Mori assaulted Ren and attempted to use their White Center connections with the police to take Kyoko back. Kenji's father stopped them, so they made a deal with Ren: do one job, and they will stop pursuing Kyoko. The job in question turned out to be the meteorite cleanup, and Kyoko witnessed Ren's transformation and apparent death. Six years before the present, Kyoko, as a junior reporter, returned to Ren's workshop and founded the Human Vapor in the basement. Trying to awaken him, she discovered that the recording of Ellie My Love, their favorite song, returned him to human form, but he could not respond and simply asked what wish he could fulfill. After seeing the files on Mori's continued abuses, she attempted to provoke a confession through an ambush interview. When Mori expressed no remorse, Kyoko wished for the Human Vapor to kill him, making it look like a suicide. Mori gave up Otomo and Professor Sano, starting Kyoko's revenge, while Mori's apparent suicide led to Kenji's suspension. Kaho manages to contact Kyoko, but before they can meet, she sees the Human Vapor in the crowd. It ignores her, and she follows it to a campaign office for Miura, which explodes in a false-flag attack.
8	"Wish"; Transliteration: "Negai" (Japanese: 願い)	Shinzo Katayama	Yeon Sang-Ho & Ryu Yong-Jae	July 2, 2026
It is revealed that Miura was inside the office, but survived. Kyoko, Kaho, and Kenji escape but are uncertain as to who ordered the new attack by the Human Vapor. They return to Ren's workshop to retrieve a camera Fujita left to record the Vapor, and confirm that Miura ordered it to kill his election staff and a large number of homeless people, but to leave him alive. They realize it is all a ploy to secure his re-election. Kenji is beaten and taken by the yakuza, while Kyoko and Kaho escape with the recording. Miura tortures and threatens him, and discovers that Kyoko has the recording and will air it. Miura wishes for the Human Vapor to kill Kyoko and destroy the recording, but this was Kyoko's plan all along. Kenji manages to fight back the yakuza and escape, Kaho posts a copy of the video to her channel (recreating her brother's occult presentation style) and Kyoko sends a copy of Obata's journal to her colleagues at the news network. The video goes viral, and public support immediately turns against Miura. Kenji goes back to the police precinct, convincing many of his colleagues to join him in arresting Miura, and is nearly assassinated by the corrupt cop Yoshida, who is stopped by his partner and accidentally bisects himself on his own piano wire, leads his brutal death. Miura flees to the roof of his campaign office, shooting and wounding several officers before attempting suicide. He nearly takes Kenji with him, but his fellow officers pull both of them back up to the roof. Meanwhile, Kyoko leads the Human Vapor to an airtight, blastproof vault below the old NFT news network building. As Kenji arrives, he sees a wounded Kyoko being billowed up by the Vapor before a human face forms in it and they both disappear in a flash of light. A year later, the truth behind the White Center and Ren and Kyoko's origins has been made public. Kyoko and Kenji's partners meet as part of a news special, paralleling Kyoko and Kenji's first meeting. Kaho is now a successful streamer, fulfilling her late brother's dream. Kenji visits Kyoko's grave, before returning his home. As he puts on Ellie My Love and falls asleep, a vapor coalesces through his window and a female form appears behind him, leaving Kenji's reaction unknown.

== Production ==
=== Development ===
The series originated from discussions between Toho producers and Yeon Sang-ho in 2018, during which Yeon selected The Human Vapor from Toho's "Transforming Human Series" for its blend of speculative science and human drama. Yeon, known for global hits like Train to Busan (2016) and Netflix's Hellbound (2021), emphasized the original film's "skillful sci-fi expressions" and emotional core, stating: "While it is a sci-fi thriller, at its core, it is a story about people. We focused on treating human emotions with care and portraying the characters’ humanity."

Script development took three years, with Ryu Yong-jae—Yeon's collaborator on Parasyte: The Grey (2024)—joining as co-writer. Shinzo Katayama, who was acclaimed for his directing live action TV seriesGannibal (2022), was selected as director for his ability to merge genre elements with intimate storytelling. Katayama, upon revisiting the original, noted: "I was intrigued by its blend of human drama and romantic elements, despite featuring an absurd creature like the Human Vapor."

The project represents Netflix's first partnership with Toho, aiming to revive the studio's tokusatsu legacy for global audiences using cutting-edge VFX. Wow Point, the production company behind Parasyte: The Grey, co-produces, infusing Korean expertise in genre storytelling.

=== Casting ===
Casting announcements began in August 2024, with Shun Oguri and Yu Aoi confirmed as leads—reuniting after their last live-action project, the 2001 TV movie Ao to Shiro de Mizuiro (also known as 24 Eyes). Yeon specifically envisioned Aoi for her role, citing her performances in Hana & Alice (2004) and Wife of a Spy (2020). Oguri, known internationally for Godzilla vs. Kong (2021), was selected for his star power and versatility. Suzu Hirose, Kento Hayashi and Yutaka Takenouchi were confirmed to join the main cast in the series as the role of the streamer siblings and former yakuza turned a company president, respectively. Japanese model Uta, was chosen as the character's title and antagonist, Human Vapor, marked as his acting debut.

=== Filming and post-production ===
Principal photography commenced in September 2024 at Toho's Stage 9 in Tokyo, with additional location shoots in Shizuoka Prefecture from February to April 2025. Filming wrapped in April 2025 after a brief pause in December 2024 when Aoi had high fever, however, she returned to work after being discharged from the hospital. The production incorporated practical effects alongside CGI to modernize the gaseous transformations, drawing from the original's tokusatsu roots.

Open casting calls for extras ran through March 2025, offering non-commercial memorabilia as incentives.

The film's visual effects were handled by Shirogumi, under the same team as Godzilla Minus One (2023).

== Release ==
Human Vapor premiered globally on Netflix on July 2, 2026. Netflix co-CEO Ted Sarandos highlighted it as a flagship upcoming title during the company's 2025 earnings call, alongside anticipated returns like Bridgerton and One Piece.
