= The Secret of the Telegian =

1960 film by Jun Fukuda

- Theatrical release poster
- Directed by: Jun Fukuda
- Screenplay by: Shinichi Sekizawa
- Starring: Kōji Tsuruta; Yumi Shirakawa; Yoshio Tsuchiya; Tadao Nakamaru
- Cinematography: Kazuo Yamada
- Edited by: Ichiji Taira
- Music by: Shiegeru Ikeno
- Production company: Toho
- Release date: April 10, 1960 (Japan)
- Running time: 85 minutes
- Country: Japan

The Secret of the Telegian (電送人間, Densō Ningen) (lit. 'The Electrically Transmitted Man') is a 1960 tokusatsu science fiction-horror and mystery film directed by Jun Fukuda, with special effects by Eiji Tsuburaya. It is the second film in Toho's Transforming Human Series, after The H-Man (1958) and followed by The Human Vapor (1960).

Herts-Lion International Corp. acquired the Western Hemisphere rights to the film in January 1964 and planned to release it theatrically in the United States. This proposed U.S. theatrical release was aborted, and the film was subsequently syndicated to television. Besides being in black and white, the TV prints were identical to Toho's uncut international English version, dubbing and all.

== Plot ==
At an amusement park's "Cave of Horrors" attraction, a man is stabbed to death and the killer leaves behind a gold-plated dog tag, a note asking the victim to meet them there, and a piece of Cryotron transistor wire. Reporter Kirioka, his childhood friend Detective Kobayashi, and the police led by Captain Onosaki begin investigating. They discover clues that lead them to a military-themed nightclub called the Military-Land Cabaret and its suspicious owner, Onishi.

Kirioka, Kobayashi, and Onosaki eventually discover that 14 years prior, Onishi, the victim, intelligence agent Takashi, and Construction Corp. foreman Taki were all soldiers assigned to protect scientist/electrical engineer Dr. Kajuro Nikki's top secret experiments in creating electronic weaponry. However, the four used the scientist to transport stolen gold instead. They faced opposition from Lance Corporal Sudo, who insisted that the gold belonged to Japan's people, but Onishi and his compatriots seemingly killed Sudo and Nikki. They stored the bodies and gold in a cave and narrowly escaped after it was destroyed by dynamite. When the four returned a year later however, they discovered the corpses and gold had gone missing.

In reality, Sudo and Nikki went into hiding and lived in seclusion on a remote farm. Over the years, the scientist perfected a teleportation device capable of moving matter from one place to another in seconds. Unbeknownst to Nikki, a bitter Sudo used the machine to elude the police while seeking revenge on his would-be killers by using the dog tags as a death sentence, sending his victims an audio tape or note detailing his intentions, and stabbing them to death with a bayonet.

Kirioka, Kobayashi, and Onosaki trace Sudo back to his farm, but are unable to prove he is the killer despite finding Nikki and his machines. Concurrently, Taki is killed while in police custody while Onishi hides in a remote coastal village. However, Sudo knew he would go there and sends him a transmitter so he can successfully kill him. The police give chase, but Sudo retrieves a hidden transmitter and begins to teleport, only for tremors to damage the receiver and cause Sudo to dissolve into oblivion.

== Cast ==
- Tadao Nakamaru as Sudo, alias Goro Nakamoto
- Koji Tsuruta as Reporter Kirioka
- Yumi Shirakawa as Akiko Chujo
- Akihiko Hirata as Detective Kobayashi
- Yoshio Tsuchiya as Onosaki, Detective Captain
- Seizaburo Kawazu as Masayoshi Onishi, Kainan Trade President
- Sachio Sakai as Taki
- Yoshifumi Tajima as Syogen, Cabaret Manager
- Fuyuki Murakami as Miura, Scientist
- Takamaru Sasaki as Takaki
- Shin Otomo as Sukimoto, Broker
- Ikio Sawamura as Amusement Park Announcer
- Ren Yamamoto as Inspector
- Akira Kitano, Yutaka Nakayama, Yutaka Sada, Tadashi Okabe as Policemen
- Hideyo Amamoto, Nadao Kirino, Shoichi Hirose as Onishi's Henchmen
- Senkichi Omura, Hironobu Wakamoto as Fishermen
- Yasuhisa Tsutsumi, Tatsuo Matsumura as Officials
- Akira Sera as Club Announcer
- Koji Uno as Trucker

== Production ==
=== Writing ===
First written by Shinichi Sekizawa in 1959, Ishiro Honda was originally meant to direct this film, but he left the film to direct Battle in Outer Space (1959), which had been delayed due to the production of The Birth of Japan (1959), instead. In his place, Toho chose Jun Fukuda, who had previously acted as an assistant director on Rodan, to direct the film. Honda would go on to direct the third entry in the mutant Series, The Human Vapor.

== Release ==
The Secret of the Telegian was released in Japan on April 10, 1960, in color and TohoScope. The film was released with English subtitles by Toho International with North American theatrical rights purchased by Herts-Lion International, who would later release the film directly to American television in pan-and-scan, black and white. The film was screened in Los Angeles for a trade screening on July 21, 1961.

== Reception ==
The film has been described retrospectively as "a fast-paced thriller with a sci-fi twist" or "one of the best pure-entertainment science-fiction pictures the studio (Toho) has put out to date." Another recent review finds that " It’s got so many weird elements that it’s entertaining, despite a preponderance of scenes of dull people in conservative suits having conferences about the crimes."
