= Invasion of Astro-Monster =

1965 film by Ishirō Honda

- Theatrical release poster

Japanese name
- Kanji: 怪獣大戦争
Transcriptions
- Revised Hepburn: Kaijū Daisensō
- Directed by: Ishirō Honda
- Special effects by: Eiji Tsuburaya
- Screenplay by: Shinichi Sekizawa
- Produced by: Tomoyuki Tanaka
- Starring: Akira Takarada; Nick Adams; Kumi Mizuno; Akira Kubo
- Cinematography: Hajime Koizumi
- Edited by: Ryohei Fujii
- Music by: Akira Ifukube
- Production companies: Toho Co., Ltd. UPA
- Distributed by: Toho (Japan); Maron Films (United States)
- Release dates: December 19, 1965 (Japan); July 29, 1970 (United States)
- Running time: 94 minutes
- Countries: Japan; United States
- Language: Japanese (Note: The film's primary language was Japanese. During filming, Nick Adams delivered all of his lines in English; he was dubbed over by Gorō Naya for the film's Japanese release. Adams's original English dialogue was restored for the film's American release.)
- Budget: ¥132 million
- Box office: $4.2 million (US/Japan rentals) (Note: In Japan, the film (including the 1971 re-issue) earned ¥410 million in distributor rentals, and $3 million in the United States.)

Invasion of Astro-Monster (Japanese: 怪獣大戦争, Hepburn: Kaijū Dai-sensō; lit. 'The Great War of the Monsters') is a 1965 kaiju film directed by Ishirō Honda, with special effects by Eiji Tsuburaya. It is the sixth film in the Godzilla franchise and Shōwa period. The film was a Japanese-American co-production; it was the second collaboration between Toho Co., Ltd. and UPA. The film stars Akira Takarada, Nick Adams, Kumi Mizuno, Akira Kubo, and Yoshio Tsuchiya, with Haruo Nakajima as Godzilla, Masaki Shinohara as Rodan, and Shoichi Hirose as King Ghidorah. In the film, aliens plead with humanity to borrow Godzilla and Rodan to defeat Ghidorah, only to betray the humans and unleash the monsters on the Earth.

Invasion of Astro-Monster was theatrically released in Japan on December 19, 1965, to mixed reviews from critics. It was followed by a theatrical release in the United States on July 29, 1970, by Maron Films as Monster Zero, on a double bill with The War of the Gargantuas.

The film was followed by Ebirah, Horror of the Deep, released on December 17, 1966.

== Plot ==
In the year 196X, two astronauts, Fuji and Glenn, are sent to investigate the surface of the mysterious "Planet X" recently detected on the far side of Jupiter. There they encounter advanced and seemingly benevolent human-like beings called the Xiliens and their leader, the Controller. The aliens usher the astronauts into their underground base, shortly before the surface is attacked by a creature that the Xiliens call "Monster Zero", but which the astronauts recognize as King Ghidorah, a planet-destroying monster that had attacked Earth once before. (Note: As depicted in Ghidorah, the Three-Headed Monster.) The monster eventually leaves, but the Controller states that Ghidorah has been attacking repeatedly, forcing them to live underground in constant fear. He requests to borrow the Earth monsters Godzilla and Rodan to protect Planet X from Ghidorah, in return for the cure for cancer. (Note: The English dub says that the formula can cure any disease.) The astronauts return to Earth and deliver the message.

Meanwhile, an inventor named Tetsuo has designed a personal alarm that emits an ear-splitting electric siren. He sells it to a businesswoman named Namikawa, but she disappears before paying him. Tetsuo is romantically involved with Fuji's sister, Haruno, but Fuji disapproves, finding him unworthy of Haruno. Tetsuo sees Namikawa with Glenn and later follows her, but he is captured and imprisoned by Xilien spies.

Glenn and Fuji begin to worry that the Xiliens may have ulterior motives. Their suspicions appear confirmed when three Xilien spacecraft appear in Japan. The Controller apologizes for coming to Earth without permission. The Xiliens locate Godzilla and Rodan, both sleeping, and use their technology to transport them to Planet X. They also bring Glenn, Fuji, and the scientist Sakurai with them. After a brief confrontation, the Earth monsters succeed in driving Ghidorah away. Glenn and Fuji sneak away during the battle and encounter two Xilien women, both of whom look identical to Namikawa. Xilien guards confront the astronauts and bring them back to the Controller, who reprimands but does not punish them. The astronauts are given a tape with instructions for the miracle cure and sent home, leaving Godzilla and Rodan behind. The tape is played for the world's leaders, but instead, it contains an ultimatum demanding that they surrender Earth to the Xiliens or be destroyed by Godzilla, Rodan, and Ghidorah, who are all under the aliens' mental control.

Glenn storms into Namikawa's office and finds her in Xilien garb. She admits that she is one of their spies, but confesses that she has fallen in love with him. Her commander arrives to arrest Glenn and executes Namikawa for letting emotion cloud her judgment, but not before she slips a note into Glenn's pocket. Glenn is taken to the same cell as Tetsuo. They read Namikawa's note, which explains that the sound from Tetsuo's invention disrupts the Xiliens' electronics. Tetsuo has a prototype with him, which he activates, weakening their captors and allowing them to escape.

Sakurai and Fuji build a device to disrupt the Xiliens' control over the monsters. Glenn and Tetsuo arrive to share the Xiliens' weakness. As the monsters attack, Sakurai's device is activated and the sound from Tetsuo's alarm is broadcast over the radio. The invasion is thwarted and the Xiliens, unable to fight back or retreat, destroy themselves en masse. The monsters awaken from their trances and a fight ensues. All three topple off a cliff into the ocean; Ghidorah surfaces and flies back into outer space, while those watching speculate that Godzilla and Rodan are probably still alive. Fuji acknowledges Tetsuo's important role in the victory and no longer thinks poorly of him. Sakurai states that he wants to send Glenn and Fuji back to Planet X to study the planet thoroughly. (Note: The English dub says that they are to be ambassadors.) The astronauts are reluctant, but make the best of the moment, happy that Earth is safe.

== Cast ==
- Akira Takarada as Kazuo Fuji
- Nick Adams as Glenn
  - Gorō Naya as Glenn (Japanese voice)
- Kumi Mizuno as Namikawa
- Jun Tazaki as Dr. Sakurai
- Akira Kubo as Tetsuo Torii
- Keiko Sawai as Haruno Fuji
- Yoshio Tsuchiya as Controller of Planet X
- Takamaru Sasaki as Chairman of Earth Committee
- Gen Shimizu as Minister of Defense
- Yoshifumi Tajima as General
- Nadao Kirino as Military Aide
- Kenzo Tabu as Commander from Planet X, Earth Unit
- Koji Uno as Namikawa's Associate
- Somesho Matsumoto as Buddhist Priest
- Haruo Nakajima as Godzilla
- Masaki Shinohara as Rodan
- Shoichi Hirose as King Ghidorah

Cast taken from Japan's Favorite Mon-star.

== Production ==
=== Crew ===
- Ishirō Honda (Note: Credited as "Inoshiro Honda" in the American version of the film.) – director
- Eiji Tsuburaya – special effects director
- Henry G. Saperstein – associate producer
- Reuben Bercovitch – associate producer
- Koji Kajita – assistant director
- Masao Suzuku – production manager
- Tadashi Koike – production manager
- Takeo Kita – art director
- Sadamasa Arikawa – special effects photography
- Mototaka Tomioka – special effects photography
- Akira Watanabe – special effects art director
- Teruyoshi Nakano – special effects assistant director

Personnel taken from Japan's Favorite Mon-star.

=== Development ===
"When they made Godzilla do that shie thing, I knew how pissed my father [Ishiro Honda] was. He didn't say a word, but he was beyond angry. My father found it humiliating. I am sure he was telling himself, 'We did not create Godzilla for that. It is not right.'"

— Ryuji Honda recalls his father's disapproval over the inclusion of Godzilla's infamous shie victory dance.

In the mid-1960s, United Productions of America (UPA) asked American producer Henry G. Saperstein to acquire high quality monster movies to distribute in North America. Saperstein approached Toho and began involvement in the film when Frankenstein vs. Baragon was already in its production phases. The production of Invasion of Astro-Monster saw the film have input from American producer Henry G. Saperstein from the beginning of production and was his first fully-fledged coproduction. Saperstein has claimed to have provided 50 percent of the funding to the three monster movie co-productions he made with Toho.

Saperstein felt that the screenplays by Shinichi Sekizawa were formulaic, noting that these films too often "opened up with a press conference or a government conference of scientists and officials" and that he convinced the production that they "needed to get into the picture a lot quicker. The conference could take place later on". The film's script also incorporates an alien invasion theme that had been done in previous Toho films, but not in the Godzilla series.

Saperstein also proposed the inclusion of an American actor to help market the film in the United States. This role was eventually filled by Nick Adams, who had previously starred in Frankenstein Conquers the World without any suggestion from Saperstein. Saperstein said Adams was "terrific, a real professional. Very cooperative, always on time, ready with his lines, available, totally cooperative. He loved being there."

The film had a lower budget than some of the previous films in the series. This led to special effects scenes having less elaborate model cities built and including footage which had been shot for previous films such as Rodan, Mothra, and Ghidorah, the Three-Headed Monster. "It was a vicious cycle of time and budget," Honda reflected. "If we recycled scenes from previous movies, we could cut the effects budget. But then we received complaints from our fans saying, 'It looks weird, it's not fresh.' We could fool the audience for a little while, but eventually they would know the trick and stop coming to see the shows. Then the studio would think that special effects film don't sell anymore. It's no wonder we could not make anything good around that period... It is a sad story."

Honda contributed in designing Namikawa's makeup. Yoshio Tsuchiya improvised the Planet X Controller's hand gestures and combined French, German, and Ryunosuke Akutagawa's Kappa language to form the alien dialect, at Honda's request. While there is a Lake Myojin in Japan, the one featured in the film is fictional. Adams' scenes were filmed within five weeks, between October 13 to November 18, 1965.

=== Special effects ===
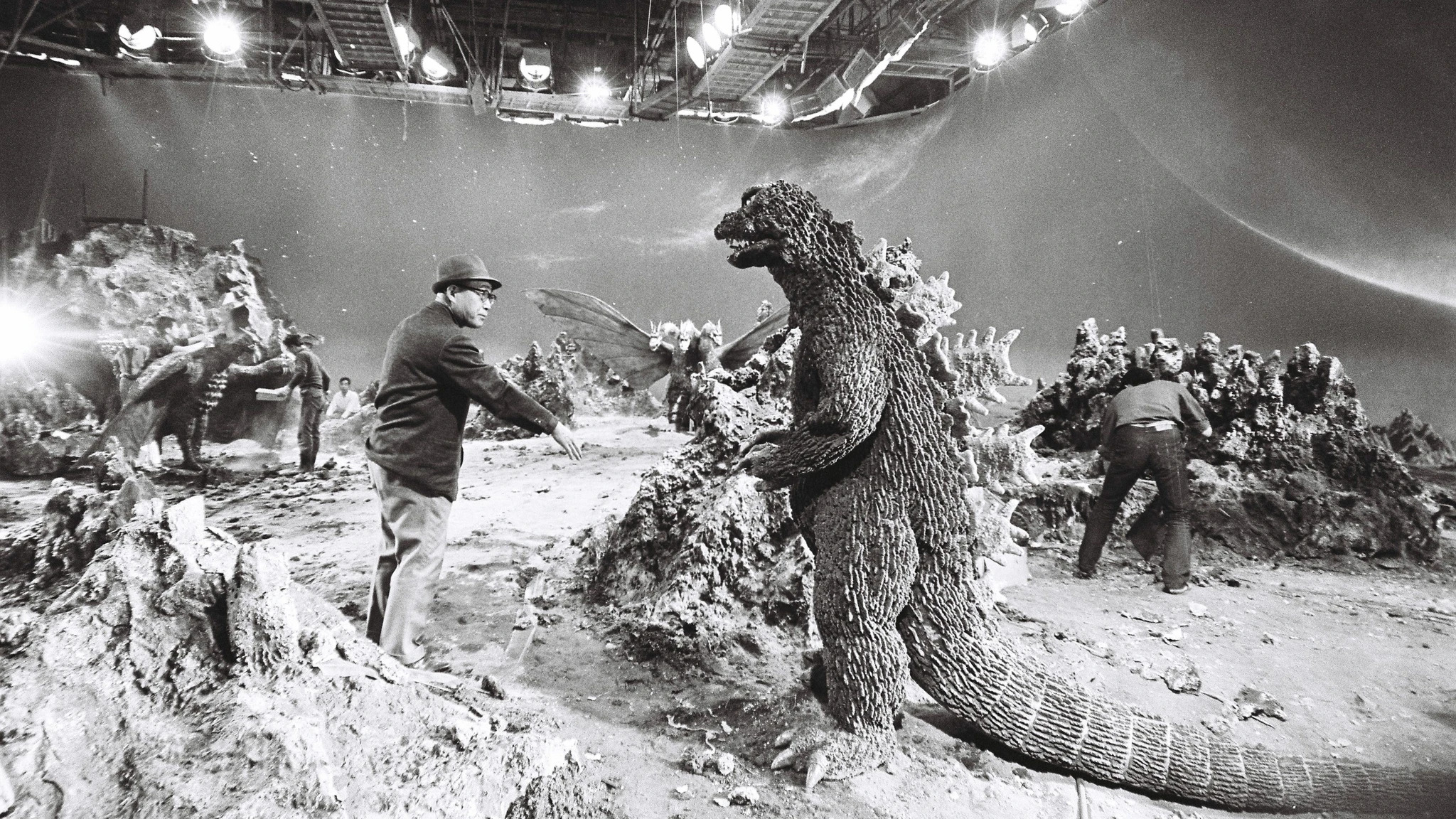
Eiji Tsuburaya directs Haruo Nakajima (in Godzilla suit) on the Planet X set created for the film

The film's special effects were directed by Eiji Tsuburaya, while Teruyoshi Nakano served as the assistant special effects director. An Oxberry optical printer was used to composite the actors and saucers on the beach. The Godzilla Sheeeh! victory dance (modeled after the trademark pose of the character Iyami from the popular manga series Osomatsu-kun) was added after Yoshio Tsuchiya suggested it to Tsuburaya, who was already supportive about anthropomorphizing monster characters with comical traits. Godzilla performer Haruo Nakajima, effects cinematographer Sadamasa Arikawa, and director Ishirō Honda were against the inclusion of the dance. Nakano recalled that audiences were divided over the dance. The design of the P1 rocket and astronaut suits were influenced by NASA's Project Gemini missions. Several P1 models were produced, with the biggest reaching 3 meters tall.

In one scene, the effects crew wanted to show the 3-meter P1 lift from a low angle, however, its size would have exposed the top edge of the Planet X set. Against company policy, special effects art director Yasuyuki Inoue broke the sound stage floor, and dug a hole to allow the P1 to rise from the subterranean base. Inoue later got in trouble after the hole was discovered, however, Inoue would later repeat this technique in Destroy All Monsters. The smoke effects in the Lake Myojin scenes were created by filling a thermos bottle with liquid nitrogen and destroying them underwater to create a chemical reaction. Effects animator Sadao Iizuka created the transport tractor beam and designed it after a Neon club sign he saw in Shibuya ward.

For Godzilla, a new suit was produced by Teizo Toshimitsu. The new suit removed the kneecaps from the previous two films, the breast bone was slightly retained and deemphasized, the dorsal fins were less pointed, and the eyes were enlarged. The pupils were built to be moved from left to right. The suits for King Ghidorah and Rodan were recycled from the previous film, albeit with some alterations. For Ghidorah, the suit was repainted with a darker shade of gold, with fewer details on the faces due to settled rubber. For Rodan, the bulky tops on the wings were flattened and thinned. The melting radar dish model was independently built by a chief carpenter, Keiki Tanaka.

== Release ==
=== Theatrical ===
Invasion of Astro-Monster was released in Japan on December 19, 1965, by Toho, on a double bill with Young Beats. The film brought in about 3.8 million viewers in Japan and was the tenth highest grossing Japanese film for that year, earning a distribution rental income of ¥210 million during its theatrical run. Nick Adams' voice was dubbed over by Gorō Naya for the Japanese release. It was re-issued in Japan in 1971 where it was edited to a 74-minute running time under the title The Giant Monster War: King Ghidorah vs. Godzilla (怪獣大戦争 キングギドラ対ゴジラ, Kaijū Daisensō Kingu Gidora tai Gojira). In an attempt to give Keiko Sawai more roles, Toho had billed Sawai as the "Hope of '66" in the original posters. With the 1971 re-issue, the film's Japanese box office performance increased to 5.13 million ticket sales and distributor rentals of ¥410 million ($1.2 million).

In the United States, the film grossed $3 million during its theatrical run. In Europe, the film sold 1,416,731 tickets in Germany and France upon release in 1967.

=== American version ===
Co-producer Henry G. Saperstein commissioned an English dub from Glen Glenn Sound, a Los Angeles-based company, for the film's American release. Unlike some previous Godzilla films which were heavily edited for their American release, the American and Japanese versions of the film were described by David Kalat as "virtually identical". Among the changes in the American version of the film include improvised "Planet X language" scenes spoken by Yoshio Tsuchiya being cut, and a few brief shots involving the flying saucers at Lake Myojin. The audio was changed as well with sound effects added for Godzilla and several pieces of Akira Ifukube's score re-arranged. The English dialogue was written by an uncredited Riley Jackson, who was hired by UPA post-production supervisor S. Richard Krown because of his previous work on Storm Over the Pacific. Marvin Miller provided the voice for Fuji and other characters. The American version had a running time of 92 minutes.

Originally released as Invasion of the Astros at military bases in the United States, the English dub by Glen Glenn Sound was released on July 29, 1970, by Maron Films as part of a double feature with The War of the Gargantuas (also dubbed by Glen Glenn Sound). Regarding the time it took for the film to be released in the United States, Saperstein stated that Toho did not always want to release a film quickly for international release and that he had a lot of technical work to be done on the film. Variety reported that Saperstein had completed post-production in 1966 and was negotiating a distribution deal. Variety reported again in September 1970 that both the film and The War of the Gargantuas "sat on the shelf at [UPA] because [distributors] figured they had no potential".

=== Critical response ===
On the review aggregator website Rotten Tomatoes, 50% of 8 critics' reviews are positive, with an average rating of 5.1/10.

Jon Matsumoto of The Los Angeles Times declared Godzilla vs. Monster Zero as "a terrific bad movie", declaring that the film "contains most of the elements that made this film form so appealing to the average 5- to 12-year-old boy." and that the film is "riotous adult fun" due to the "unintended shoddiness of the film."

The presentation for the Criterion Channel states: "This retro romp, featuring American star Nick Adams, stands as a high point in the Showa Godzilla series."

== Home media ==
=== Japan ===
In 2008, Toho remastered the film in high-definition and premiered it on the Japanese Movie Speciality Channel, along with the rest of the Godzilla films also remastered in HD. In 2021, Toho premiered a 4K remaster of the film on the Nippon Classic Movie Channel, along with seven other Godzilla films also remastered in 4K. The film was downscaled to 2K for broadcast.

=== United States ===
In 1983, Paramount released the American version of the film on VHS and BetaMax as Godzilla vs. Monster Zero. The title Godzilla vs. Monster Zero was used when the film was broadcast on local American TV stations.

In 2007, Classic Media released the film on DVD in North America, along with other Godzilla titles. This release included the remastered, widescreen versions of the Japanese and American versions, as well as image galleries, poster slideshows, original trailers, a biography on Tomoyuki Tanaka, and an audio commentary by historian Stuart Galbraith IV. In 2014, Toho released the film on Blu-ray to commemorate the 60th anniversary of the franchise.

In 2017, Janus Films and the Criterion Collection acquired the film, as well as other Godzilla titles, to stream on Starz and FilmStruck. In 2019, the Japanese version and export English version was included in a Blu-ray box set released by the Criterion Collection, which included all 15 films from the franchise's Shōwa era. In May 2020, the export English version became available on HBO Max upon its launch.

== See also ==
- Godzilla: Final Wars
