= The H-Man =

1958 film

- Theatrical release poster
- Directed by: Ishirō Honda
- Screenplay by: Takeshi Kimura
- Story by: Hideo Kaijo
- Produced by: Tomoyuki Tanaka
- Starring: Yumi Shirakawa; Kenji Sahara; Akihiko Hirata; Koreya Senda; Makoto Satō
- Cinematography: Hajime Koizumi
- Edited by: Ichiji Taira
- Music by: Masaru Sato
- Production company: Toho
- Distributed by: Toho
- Release date: 24 June 1958
- Running time: 87 minutes
- Country: Japan
- Language: Japanese

The H-Man (美女と液体人間, Bijo to Ekitai-ningen; lit. 'Beauty and the Liquid People') is a 1958 Japanese science fiction thriller film directed by Ishirō Honda, written by Takeshi Kimura with special effects by Eiji Tsuburaya. It stars Kenji Sahara and Akihiko Hirata. It is the first film in Toho's Transforming Human Series, followed by The Secret of the Telegian and The Human Vapor (both 1960).

== Plot ==
On a rainy night, two suspicious men emerge from the sewers in Tokyo. Suddenly, one of the men begins to moan in pain, fires a pistol, and then vanishes without a trace, leaving behind his clothes and a large quantity of drugs.

Detective Tominaga of the Tokyo Metropolitan Police traces the missing man’s identity to Misaki, a known gang member, and deduces that the men may have been planning a drug smuggling operation. Tominaga interrogates Chikako Arai, a singer at the cabaret Homura and Misaki’s mistress, who had been approached by the mysterious men. However, the man’s true identity turns out not to be a gang associate but Tominaga’s friend, Masada, an assistant professor of biochemistry at Joto University.

Masada theorizes that the disappeared Misaki may have been exposed to large amounts of radioactive material and transformed into “Liquid Men.” He presents evidence including eyewitness accounts of sailors from the Ryujin-Maru II, who had been irradiated during a South Pacific hydrogen bomb test and allegedly became Liquid Men, experimental results showing frogs liquefying under intense radiation, and a life preserver from the Ryujin-Maru II found near Eitai Bridge. The police dismiss these claims as insufficient evidence. Meanwhile, strange incidents occur around Chikako, including gang members who attempt to attack her mysteriously disappearing.

The investigation hits a dead end, but testimony from Chikako points to Homura’s waiter, Shimazaki, as possibly connected to the incidents. The police mobilize a raid on the cabaret in Tsukiji. At the same time, a Liquid Human emerges from the Sumida River and liquefies the cabaret’s dancers, officers, and Shimazaki. Recognizing the gravity of the situation, the investigators take Masada and his mentor, Dr. Maki, implement a plan to pour gasoline into the sewers near the Sumida River and set it ablaze, successfully exterminating the Liquid Men.

During these events, Masada and Chikako develop a romantic relationship. However, Uchida, a gang member who had partnered with Misaki, abducts Chikako to recover the drugs hidden in the sewers. Uchida is killed by a Liquid Man, and Chikako is endangered by the dual threats of the Liquid Men and the spreading fire. Masada and Tominaga’s search team dive into the sewers and rescue her safely.

The fire along the Sumida River ultimately destroys all remaining Liquid Men. Nevertheless, Dr. Maki warns that if Earth were ever covered in deadly radioactive fallout and humanity were wiped out, the Liquid Men might be the next dominant life form on the planet.

== Cast ==
- Yumi Shirakawa as Chikako Arai, singer at the Cabaret Homura
- Kenji Sahara as Masada, associate professor at Jyoto University
- Akihiko Hirata as First Inspector Tominaga
- Eitaro Ozawa as Chief Detective Miyashita
- Koreya Senda as Professor Maki, Jyoto University
- Machiko Kitagawa as Hanae, hostess of Cabaret Homura
- Yoshio Tsuchiya as Detective Taguchi
- Naomi Shiraishi as Ayako, Masada's assistant
- Yoshibumi Tajima as Detective Sakata
- Tetsu Nakamura as Mr. Gold, drug buyer
- Makoto Satō as Uchida, gangster
- Hisaya Ito as Misaki, gangster
- Ko Mishima as Kishi, Hanada gangster
- Jun Fujio as Nishiyama, Hanada gangster
- Ren Yamamoto as Saiki, Hanada gangster
- Shin Otomo as Hamano, Hanada gangster
- Koichi Sato as Sato, gangster
- Yutaka Nakayama as Hanada gangster
- Ayumi Sonoda as Emi, Cabaret Homura dancer
- Minosuke Yamada as Chief Deputy Shibata
- Tadao Nakamaru as Detective Seki
- Yosuke Natsuki as Yoshiko Ieda: Couple in the beginning
- Akira Yamada as Mr. Wakasugi
- Nadao Kirino as Shimazaki, Cabaret Homura waiter, gangster
- Yutaka Sada as Taxi Driver who hits H-Man
- Soji Ubukata, Mitsuo Tsuda as Tokyo Metropolitan Police chief's
- Kamayuki Tsubono as Detective Ogawa
- Koji Uruki, Minoru Ito as Detectives
- Kan Hayashi as Police officer
- Haruya Kato as Souchan, crewman on Ryujin-Maru No. 2
- Senkichi Omura as Daichan, crewman on Ryujin-Maru No. 2
- Akira Sera as Horita, crewman on Ryujin-Maru No. 2
- Yasuhiro Shigenobu as Ankichi, crewman on Ryujin-Maru No. 2
- Shigeo Kato as Matsuchan, crewman on Ryujin-Maru No. 2
- Toku Ihara, Hiroshi Akitsu as crewmen on Ryujin-Maru No. 2
- Shin Yoshida as crewman on Ryujin-Maru No. 2 / drunken customer at Cabaret Homura
- Katsumi Tezuka as crewman on Ryujin-Maru No. 2
- Haruo Nakajima as Chosuke, crewman on Ryujin-Maru No. 2 / H-Man

== Release ==
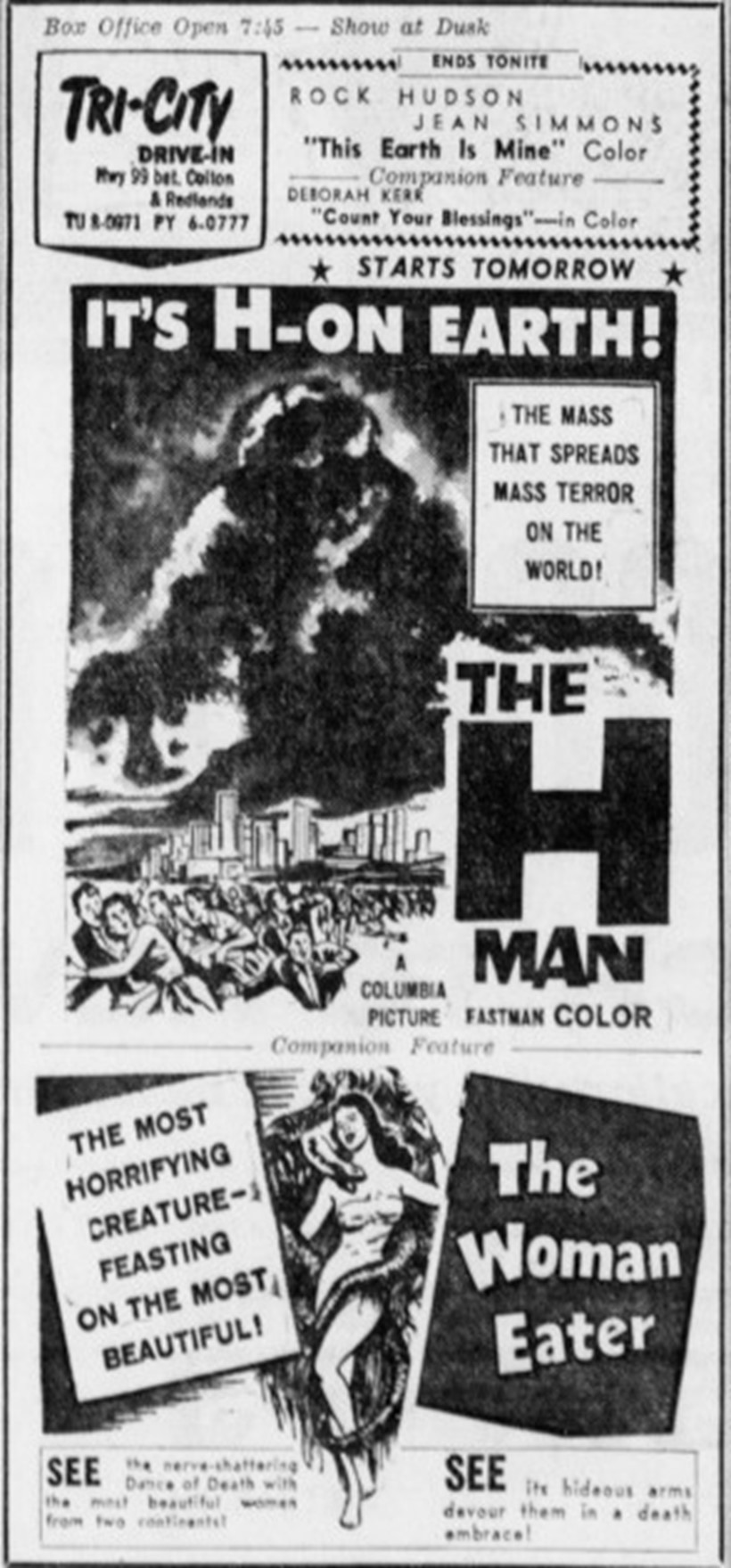
Drive-in advertisement from 1959 for The H-Man and co-feature, The Woman Eater.

The H-Man was distributed theatrically in Japan by Toho on June 24, 1958.

The film was released theatrically in the United States on June 23, 1959 by Columbia Pictures with an English-language dub and 79-minute running time. It played on a double feature with The Woman Eater (1959).

The original Japanese version of the film focuses a similar amount of time on the drug-running criminals as activities of the H-Men. This was cut in the English dubbed film.

Columbia released The H-Man on VHS. The film was released on DVD in 2009 in the United States.

== Reception ==
From contemporary reviews, A New York Herald Tribune film critic at the time called it, "A good-natured poke at atom-bomb tests[.] The picture is plainly making a case against the use of nuclear bombs. At the same time, there is a great deal of lively entertainment in the story involving police, dope smugglers, scientists and some very pretty Japanese girls." The Daily Variety described the film as "well made" "seemingly more thoughtful" than The Mysterians and Gigantis. The review noted Takeshi Kumra's screenplay as "effective" and Honda's direction as taking "full advantage of the story [which is a] technically excellent production." The Monthly Film Bulletin noted the film had "all the usual faults and virtues of Japanese SF-cum-horror fiction[.] But for special effects, trick photography and spectacular staging, the Japanese again beat their Hollywood counterparts at their own game: The fantasy element of vanishing bodies and mobile liquid is brilliantly done."
