= Yoshio Tsuchiya =

Japanese actor (1927–2017)

- Born: May 18, 1927; Kofu, Yamanashi, Japan
- Died: February 8, 2017 (aged 89)
- Occupation: Actor
- Years active: 1952–2014

Yoshio Tsuchiya (土屋 嘉男, Tsuchiya Yoshio; May 18, 1927 – February 8, 2017) was a Japanese actor. He appeared in such films as Toshio Matsumoto's surreal Funeral Parade of Roses and Akira Kurosawa's Seven Samurai and Red Beard, and Kihachi Okamoto's Kill!. He had a long-standing interest in UFOs and wrote several books on the subject. He preferred starring in science fiction films, usually as aliens, or people possessed by them, in such films as Battle in Outer Space, Monster Zero, and Destroy All Monsters.

== Biography ==
Tsuchiya was born in Kofu, Yamanashi in 1927. His film debut was in the 1952 Shintoho film Murder Suspect (殺人容疑者). During the auditions for Akira Kurosawa's Seven Samurai, Tsuchiya was watching, and was picked by Kurosawa although he originally had no intention of auditioning himself.

Seven Samurai was filmed during the same time as Godzilla, and Tsuchiya would frequently leave the set of Seven Samurai to see Godzilla being filmed. In an interview, Tsuchiya said "Because I was doing Seven Samurai I couldn't appear in the first Godzilla. That's why I insisted they put me in the sequel." Tsuchiya's wish was granted and he appeared in a role in Godzilla Raids Again.

Although Tsuchiya appeared in many films by Akira Kurosawa, he also appeared in many science fiction films, saying "Most actors get comfortable with a certain genre, and they stick to that. But as far as I was concerned, it was equally prestigious to appear in science-fiction films or in Kurosawa movies." Tsuchiya especially liked to play aliens (or people controlled by aliens). When originally given the role of one of the heroes in The Mysterians, he turned down the role in favor of the Mysterian leader, because he was only interested in playing "interesting, strong and/or twisted characters". When director Ishirō Honda told him that since the Mysterian leader wore a mask, his face would not be seen, Tsuchiya said "That's all right. I just want to play the alien!" He has a personal interest in space and even claims to have seen several UFOs. "At the time I was very interested in the Space Race, and belonged to an organization which promoted a mission to the moon. I got all my fellow actors to join - Mifune, Shimura. Then I learned that this organization was crooked and really wanted to divide up the moon and sell it as real estate! I was so outraged that in [The Mysterians] when the earth scientists balk at giving the Mysterians some land on earth, I ad-libbed, 'But you're trying to divide up the moon and sell it!'"

He lobbied for the title role in Tomei Ningen (1954), but was forced by the studio to play the leading man. Eventually realizing their mistake, he was cast in the title role in The Human Vapor.

He was originally cast to play the assassin Malness in Ghidorah, the Three-Headed Monster, but was unable to because he was filming Red Beard.

In 1991, after a long absence from Toho monster films (his last was in the 1970 film Space Amoeba), Tsuchiya returned to the Godzilla series in Godzilla vs. King Ghidorah as Shindo, a World War II veteran who met a pre-mutated Godzilla during the battle in the Marshall Islands.

Tsuchiya died of lung cancer on February 8, 2017, at the age of 89.

== Selected filmography ==
=== Film ===
- Murder Suspect (殺人容疑者) (1952)
- The Tower of Himeyuri (ひめゆりの塔) (1953)
- Seven Samurai (七人の侍) (1954) - Rikichi
- Kimi shinitamo koto nakare (1954)
- Mitsuyu-sen (1954)
- Tomei Ningen (透明人間) (1954) - Reporter Komatsu
- Zoku tenka taihei (1955)
- Godzilla Raids Again (ゴジラの逆襲) (1955) - Tajima, Member of Osaka Defense Corps
- No Time for Tears (1955) - Maruyama
- Sanjusan go sha otonashi (1955)
- Shin kurama tengu daisanbu (1955)
- Natsume Sôseki no Sanshirô (1955) - Nonomiya
- I Live in Fear (生きものの記録) (1955) - Factory Worker After Fire
- Kyatsu o nigasuna (1956) - Shiraishi
- Migotona musume (1956) - Nobuo Takahara
- Tsuma no kokoro (1956)
- Throne of Blood (蜘蛛巣城) (1957) - Washizu samurai
- Ninjitsu (1957)
- Tokyo da you okkasan (1957)
- Salaryman shusse taikôki (1957) - Maruo
- Chieko-sho (1957) - KoYama
- Waga mune ni niji wa kiezu (1957) - Takeshi Shimada
- The Mysterians (地球防衛軍) (1957) - Leader of the Mysterians
- Kajikko (1958)
- Song for a Bride (花嫁三重奏) (1958)
- Rickshaw Man (1958)
- Anzukko (1958) - Ishima
- Bijo to ekitai ningen (1958) - Detective Taguchi
- Yatsu ga satsujinsha da (1958)
- Josei SOS (1958)
- Varan the Unbelievable (1958) - Military Officer Katsumoto
- The Hidden Fortress (1958) - Samurai on horse
- Kotan no kuchibue (1959)
- Oshaberi okusan (1959)
- Sensuikan I-57 kofuku sezu (1959)
- Battle in Outer Space (宇宙大戦争) (1959) - Iwomura
- Densô ningen (1960) - Det. Capt. Okazaki
- Hawai Middowei daikaikûsen: Taiheiyô no arashi (1960)
- Daigaku no sanzôkutachi (1960) - Detective Director Iwano
- Man Against Man (1960) - Detective Yoshizawa
- The Bad Sleep Well (1960) - ADA secretary
- The Human Vapor (ガス人間第一号) (1960) - Mizuno the Librarian
- Hurricane of the Pacific (1960)
- Yojimbo (用心棒) (1961) - Kohei
- Death on the Mountain (1961) - Jiro Makita
- Daigaku no wakadaishô (1961)
- Sanjuro (椿三十郎) (1962) - Samurai
- Kurenai no sora (1962)
- Doburoku no Tatsu (1962) - Kida
- Chikata nikki (1962)
- Chûshingura (1962) - Matanojô Shiota
- Varan the Unbelievable (1962) - Soldier
- Attack Squadron! (1963)
- Roppongi no yoru: aishite aishite (1963) - Inspector Ihara
- Nippon jitsuwa jidai (1963)
- High and Low (天国と地獄) (1963) - Detective Murata
- Legacy of the 500,000 (1963) - Yamazaki
- Matango (1963) - Masafumi Kasai - Owner
- Hiken (1963)
- Red Beard (赤ひげ) (1965) - Dr. Handayû Mori
- Taiheiyô kiseki no sakusen: Kisuka (1965) - Terai
- Frankenstein vs. Baragon (フランケンシュタイン対地底怪獣バラゴン) (1965) - Mr. Kawai
- Beast Alley (1965) - Katsuragi
- Aku no kaidan (1965) - Detective
- Invasion of Astro-Monster (怪獣大戦争 a.k.a. Godzilla vs. Monster Zero) (1965) - Controller of Planet X
- Musekinin Shimizu Minato (1966)
- Hikinige (1966) - Shuichi
- Zero faita dai kûsen (1966)
- Kokusai himitsu keisatsu: Zettai zetsumei (1967) - General Rubesa
- Sasaki Kojiro (1967) - Heisuke Ichinami
- Japan's Longest Day (1967) - Lt. Colonel Hiroshi Fuha - Eastern District Army Staff Officer
- Two in the Shadow (1967) - Yumiko's husband
- Son of Godzilla (怪獣島の決戦 ゴジラの息子) (1967) - Furukawa
- Booted Babe, Busted Boss (1968) - Kurokawa / Killer
- Kill! (斬る) (1968) - Shinroku Matsuo
- Destroy All Monsters (怪獣総進撃) (1968) - Dr. Otani
- Rengô kantai shirei chôkan: Yamamoto Isoroku (1968) - Staff Officer Kuroshima
- Koi ni mezameru koro (1969) - Shunsaku Yamamoto
- Battle of the Japan Sea (1969) - Staff Officer Akiyama
- Funeral Parade of Roses (薔薇の葬列) (1969) - Gonda
- Machibuse (1970) - Itahachi
- Space Amoeba (ゲゾラ・ガニメ・カメーバ 決戦!南海の大怪獣) (1970) - Dr. Kyoichi Mida
- The Militarists (1970) - Okabe (uncredited)
- Kuro no shamen (1971)
- Zatoichi's Conspiracy (1973) - Superintendent Shobei
- Nishijin Shinju (1977) - Yoshida
- Karuizawa fujin (1982) - Gen'ichirô Nakagawa
- Shōsetsu Yoshida gakkō (小説吉田学校) (1983) - Jōji Hayashi
- Rûju (1984) - Akio Tsuchiya
- Tokyo: The Last War (帝都大戦) (1989) - Dr. Mizuno
- Earth Defense Girl Iko-chan: The Great Oedo Operation (地球防衛少女イコちゃん 大江戸大作戦) (1990) - Dr. Mizuno (voice)
- Godzilla vs. King Ghidorah (ゴジラVSキングギドラ) (1991) - Businessman Yasuaki Shindo
- Kidan (2005)
- Yamauchi Keisuke: The Kayô Movie Shôwa kayô kiki ippatsu! (2014) - (final film role)
- Mifune: The Last Samurai (2015) - as Himself

=== TV Series ===
- Taikōki (1965)
- Ultra Q (ウルトラQ) (1966) - Ono (episode 2)
- Ultraman (ウルトラマン) (1966) - Dr. Morita (episode 18)
- Ultraseven (ウルトラセブン) (1967) - Dr. Tsuchida (episodes 14 and 15)
- Haru no Sakamichi (1971) as Ōtani Yoshitsugu
- Daichūshingura (1971) as Tsuchiya Chikara
- Taiyō ni Hoero! (1973) (episode 73)
- Katsu Kaishū (1974) as Kimura Hyogo
- Onihei Hankachō (1975) (episode14)
- Daitokai Part2 (1977) (episode 29) as Inoue Yukio
- Seibu Keisatsu Part 3 (1983) (Episode 27) as Lieutenant Hattori
- Kage no Gundan III (1982) (episode17) as Okudaira Tadatsune
- Haru no Hatō (1985) - Inoue Kaoru
- Onihei Hankachō (1989) (episode7)
