= Frankenstein vs. Baragon =

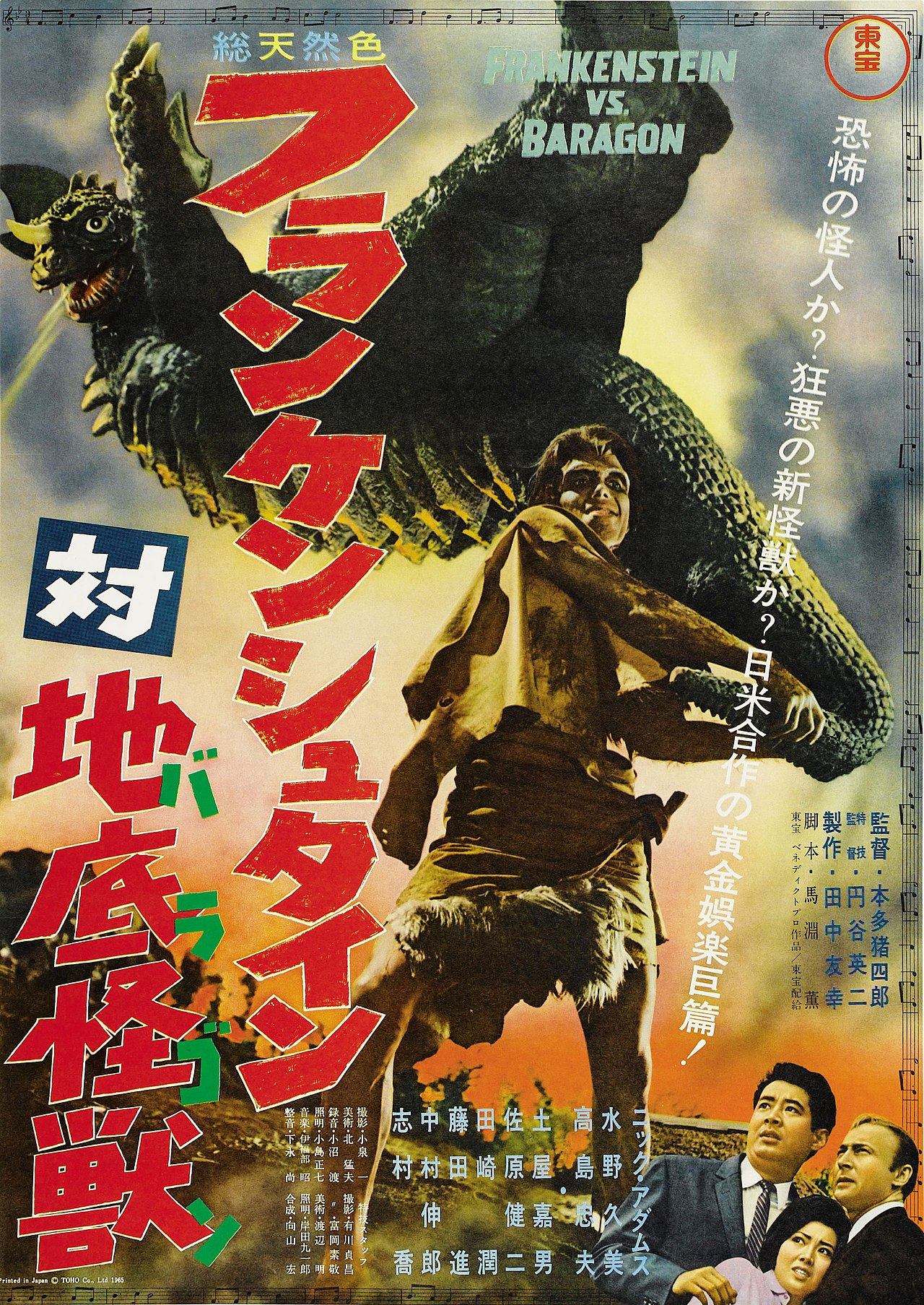
- Theatrical release poster

Japanese name
- Kanji: フランケンシュタイン対地底怪獣バラゴン
Transcriptions
- Revised Hepburn: Furankenshutain tai Chitei Kaijū Baragon
- Directed by: Ishirō Honda
- Screenplay by: Takeshi Kimura
- Story by: Reuben Bercovitch; Jerry Sohl
- Based on: Frankenstein by Mary Shelley
- Produced by: Tomoyuki Tanaka
- Starring: Nick Adams; Kumi Mizuno; Tadao Takashima
- Cinematography: Hajime Koizumi
- Edited by: Ryohei Fujii
- Music by: Akira Ifukube
- Production companies: Toho Co., Ltd; Henry G. Saperstein Enterprises
- Distributed by: Toho (Japan); American International Pictures (United States)
- Release dates: August 8, 1965 (Japan); July 8, 1966 (United States)
- Running time: 89 minutes
- Countries: Japan; United States
- Language: Japanese (Note: During filming, Nick Adams delivered all of his lines in English; however, he was dubbed over by Gorō Naya for the film's Japanese release. Adams' original English dialogue was restored for the film's American release.)
- Box office: ¥93,000,000 (equivalent to ¥425,799,635 in 2024) (Japan)

Frankenstein vs. Baragon (Japanese: フランケンシュタイン対地底怪獣バラゴン, Hepburn: Furankenshutain tai Chitei Kaijū Baragon; lit. 'Frankenstein vs. Subterranean Monster Baragon') is a 1965 kaiju film directed by Ishirō Honda, with special effects by Eiji Tsuburaya. The film stars Nick Adams, Kumi Mizuno and Tadao Takashima, with Koji Furuhata as Frankenstein and Haruo Nakajima as Baragon. An international co-production of Japan and the United States, it was the first collaboration between Toho and Henry G. Saperstein. In the film, scientists investigate the origins of a mysterious monster boy Frankenstein and his resistance to radiation that makes him grow to monstrous size, while another monster Baragon ravages the countryside.

Frankenstein vs. Baragon was theatrically released in Japan on August 8, 1965, followed by a theatrical release in the United States on July 8, 1966 by American International Pictures as Frankenstein Conquers the World. The film was followed by The War of the Gargantuas, released on July 31, 1966.

== Plot ==
Near the end of World War II in Nazi Germany, Nazi officers confiscate the living heart of the Frankenstein's monster from Dr. Riesendorf and transport it by U-boat to the Imperial Japanese Navy, who take it to a research facility in Hiroshima for further experimentation. As the experiments begin, Hiroshima is destroyed by the Americans using a nuclear bomb dropped by Enola Gay. Fifteen years later, Hiroshima has been rapidly rebuilt. A feral boy runs rampant through the streets, catching and devouring small animals. This comes to the attention of American scientist Dr. James Bowen and his assistants Drs. Sueko Togami and Ken'ichiro Kawaji. A year later, they find the boy hiding in a cave on a beach, cornered by outraged villagers. Bowen and his team take care of the boy and discover that he is building a strong resistance to radiation.

The former IJN officer Kawaji, who was a member of the submarine crew which brought the heart to Hiroshima, is now working as a technician at an oil refinery in Akita Prefecture, when a sudden earthquake destroys the refinery. Kawaji catches a glimpse of a non-human monster within a fissure in the ground before it disappears. Meanwhile, Bowen and his team find out that the strange boy is growing in size due to an intake of protein. Afraid of his strength, the scientists lock and chain the boy in a cage and Sueko, who cares for him, feeds him some protein-filled food to sustain him. Bowen is visited by Kawaji, who tells him that the boy could have grown from the heart of the Frankenstein Monster, as the boy was seen in Hiroshima more than once before. At Bowen's advice, Kawaji confers with Riesendorf in Frankfurt. Riesendorf recommends cutting off a limb, speculating that a new one will grow back. Sueko and Bowen strongly object to this method.

Ignoring Bowen's suggestion to think it over, Kawaji tenaciously attempts to sever one of the limbs of the boy-turned-giant, now called "Frankenstein". He is interrupted by a TV crew, who enrage Frankenstein with bright studio spotlights and Frankenstein breaks loose. Frankenstein visits Sueko at her apartment before escaping Hiroshima entirely, heading to fend for himself in the countryside. A severed, still-living hand of Frankenstein's is found, proving Riesendorf's theory, though it dies shortly after accidentally trapping itself under a grate without a supply of protein to sustain it. Unbeknownst to Bowen and his team, the subterranean burrowing dinosaur named Baragon ravages various villages. The Japanese authorities and media believe this to be Frankenstein's doing and Frankenstein narrowly escapes being hunted down by the JSDF. Before Bowen and his team dismiss Frankenstein, Kawai returns to tell them that Frankenstein may not be responsible for the disasters; it could be Baragon, the monster he previously saw in Akita. He tries to convince the authorities, but to no avail. Kawaji still wishes the scientists luck in finding and saving Frankenstein.

Bowen, Sueko and Kawaji attempt to find Frankenstein on their own. To Bowen and Sueko's shock, Kawaji reveals his plans to kill Frankenstein by blinding him with grenades in order to recover his heart and his brain. Kawaji presses on to find Frankenstein, but finds Baragon instead. Kawaji and Bowen try in vain to stop Baragon with the grenades. Frankenstein emerges in time to save the scientists and engages Baragon. The monsters battle until Frankenstein snaps Baragon's neck, killing it. Then the ground beneath them collapses and swallows them up. Kawaji states that the immortal heart will live on and they may one day see him again, but Bowen believes that Frankenstein is better off dead.

== Cast ==
- Nick Adams as Dr. James Bowen
  - Gorō Naya voices Bowen in Japanese version
- Tadao Takashima as Dr. Ken'ichiro Kawaji
- Kumi Mizuno as Dr. Sueko Togami
- Yoshio Tsuchiya as Mr. Kawai
- Yoshifumi Tajima as Murata
- Takashi Shimura as Hiroshima surgeon
- Susumu Fujita as Osaka Police Chief
- Peter Mann as Dr. Riesendorf
  - Kazuo Kumakura voices Riesendorf in Japanese version
- Keiko Sawai as Tazuko Towoi
- Koji Furuhata as Frankenstein
  - Sumio Nakao as the younger Frankenstein
- Haruo Nakajima as Baragon

== Production ==
Furuhata and Nakajima on-set with the special effects crew

=== Development ===
In the early 1960s, special effects technician Willis H. O'Brien (who provided the stop motion animation for the 1933 film King Kong) proposed an idea for a new King Kong film to be filmed in color. O'Brien wrote a story outline titled King Kong vs. Frankenstein and succeeded in obtaining permission from RKO Pictures attorney Daniel O'Shea to use the King Kong character. O'Shea then introduced O'Brien to film producer John Beck to help secure funding. With a completed script by George Worthing Yates (retitled as King Kong vs. Prometheus, in reference to the original Mary Shelley book), Beck generated some interest in Hollywood but failed to secure funding and reached out overseas.

Behind O'Brien's back, Beck succeeded in striking a deal with Japanese studio Toho Co., Ltd (producers of the 1954 film Godzilla) to produce King Kong vs. Prometheus. Toho was only interested in acquiring the King Kong character and the project was redeveloped into King Kong vs. Godzilla. O'Brien attempted to sue (presumably Beck) over the deal with Toho but dropped the lawsuit due to mounting attorney fees and died on November 8, 1962.

Shortly after the release of King Kong vs. Godzilla, Toho began work on a film that would potentially feature the Frankenstein monster, or simply named "Frankenstein". Inspired by a story concept by John Meredyth Lucas (who wrote the American localizations for three of Toho's films), Toho conceived of Frankenstein vs. The Human Vapor and tasked Ishirō Honda to direct and Shinichi Sekizawa to write the script. Sekizawa failed to finish the story treatment, citing lack of inspiration, and abandoned the idea.

In 1964, Honda traveled to the United States to help finalize a deal with Henry G. Saperstein and his United Productions of America (UPA) studio. The deal would see UPA co-producing three films with Toho, with "the right of final decision" on the film by Honda. The deal also allowed Saperstein to attach Hollywood actors as the leads, to provide half the financing for territorial rights, and consultation on the scripts. One of the films to be co-produced under the deal would be Frankenstein vs. Godzilla.

=== Writing ===
The idea for Frankenstein vs. Godzilla originated from UPA, with Jerry Sohl and Reuben Bercovitch providing the initial concept. Both writers retained credit for the story, but it is unclear how many of their ideas were retained in the final film. Takeshi Kimura's first draft, dated July 3, 1964, features many of the same elements in the final film. The story dealt with the heart of the original Frankenstein monster becoming irradiated and growing into a giant Frankenstein monster. Afraid the giant would start eating people, Godzilla would be awakened from slumber in the Kurile Trench by the JSDF and goaded into a fight with the monster in hopes of destroying him. The story would end with natural disasters defeating the monsters as Godzilla disappears into a raging river flow and the giant Frankenstein monster disappears into magma caused by an erupting volcano.

A March 1965 draft replaced Godzilla with new kaiju Baragon, and the final draft from May 10, 1965 had Frankenstein acting like less of a monster, with the human characters fostering compassion for him. Honda criticized the decision by Toho and UPA to include a kaiju, calling it "convenient", and originally wanted to explore the tragedy and immoral science behind Frankenstein instead.

=== Pre-production ===
Nick Adams was handpicked by Saperstein for the lead. Several crew members spoke fondly of Adams, who would amuse his fellow co-stars and crew with stories from Hollywood. Co-director Koji Kajita regaled that Adams became good friends with Honda and Yoshio Tsuchiya, often teasing them and them teasing Adams back. Despite being married, Adams flirted openly with Kumi Mizuno and called her on the phone every night. Mizuno admitted that Adams was "headstrong" and that she had to "get out of that situation", but stated it was "fun" to work with him. Adams delivered all of his lines in English, while everyone else delivered their lines in Japanese.

Koji Furuhata earned the role of Frankenstein through an open audition. Furuhata wore green contact lenses to emulate a Caucasian look, a flat-head prosthetic and brow resembling Jack Pierce's Frankenstein Monster design and large shirts and loincloths. Honda had originally wanted to explore more of the science-gone-wrong theme, but was forced to change the story in the middle to reach a climactic monster battle.

=== Alternate ending ===
Saperstein had requested an alternative ending for the international release in which Frankenstein battled a giant octopus, who eventually defeated Frankenstein by dragging him into a lake. This resulted in the cast and crew being reassembled after principal photography and post-production had wrapped, as well as building a new set and building a new prop to represent the giant octopus from foam, latex and sawdust initially moulded over a wire frame for support during construction. Despite filming the new ending, Saperstein ended up cutting it regardless because he believed the giant octopus "wasn't that good".

When the film was in production, trade magazines listed this film's title as Frankenstein vs. the Giant Devilfish. Honda had stated that the reason why the giant octopus ending was initially requested was because the American co-producers were "astonished" by the giant octopus scene in King Kong vs. Godzilla and wanted a similar scene in this film. Honda also confirmed that various endings were shot, stating: "In fact Mr. Tsuburaya had shot five or six final scenes for this film. The infamous giant octopus is only one of these endings." Honda also expressed that the alternate ending was never intended to be released on the Japanese version, stating: "there was never any official plan to utilize the sequence; but an alternative print with that ending was accidentally aired on television surprising many Japanese fans because it was not the ending they had remembered from the original theatrical release."

== Release ==
=== Theatrical ===
The film was released in Japan on August 8, 1965, two days after the 20th anniversary of the Hiroshima bombing. The film grossed ¥93 million during its Japanese theatrical run. The film was released theatrically in the United States as Frankenstein Conquers the World on July 8, 1966 by American International Pictures. This version was dubbed in English by Titan Productions and restored Adams' original English dialogue.

=== Home media ===
In June 2007, Tokyo Shock released Frankenstein vs. Baragon on a two-disc DVD, the first time the film was released on DVD in North America. This version includes the original Japanese theatrical version, the American version (running at 84 minutes), and the international version with the alternate giant octopus ending (running at 93 minutes). All three versions were presented in widescreen. The international version (titled Frankenstein vs. the Giant Devilfish) features an audio commentary by Sadamasa Arikawa, the film's special effects photographer. Disc two features two Japanese trailers, deleted scenes and a photo gallery, which was provided by Ed Godziszewski (editor of Japanese Giants and author of The Illustrated Encyclopedia of Godzilla). In November 2017, Toho released the film on Blu-ray in Japan. This release also includes an HD remaster of the international version.

In September 2022, The Criterion Collection announced to have acquired the Japanese version to stream on their site the Criterion Channel.

== Sequel ==
The following year, Toho released a sequel titled The War of the Gargantuas, also co-produced with UPA. In the film, pieces of Frankenstein's cells mutate into two giant humanoid monsters: Sanda (the Brown Gargantua) and Gaira (the Green Gargantua). The former is a benevolent and peace-loving creature, while the latter is murderous and savage. Apart from a reference to a severed hand, UPA obscured all references to Frankenstein in the American version and the names of the monsters were changed to the Brown Gargantua and the Green Gargantua. Gaira and Sanda would later appear in two of Toho's tokusatsu series, Ike! Godman and Ike! Greenman, before remaining absent for over 40 years, with Gaira making his latest appearance in a 2008 Go! Godman special.

== See also ==
- List of films featuring Frankenstein's monster
