= Takeshi Kimura =

Japanese screenwriter

- Born: Kaoru Mabuchi; February 4, 1911; Osaka, Japan
- Died: May 3, 1987 (aged 76)
- Occupation: Screenwriter
- Years active: 1953–1971

Kaoru Mabuchi (馬淵 薫, Mabuchi Kaoru; February 4, 1911 – May 3, 1987), also known by his pen name Takeshi Kimura (木村 武, Kimura Takeshi), was a Japanese screenwriter who wrote many films for Toho studios. Kimura scripted several films for director Ishirō Honda, including Matango, Frankenstein vs. Baragon, The War of the Gargantuas, King Kong Escapes, and Destroy All Monsters. He was a member of the Japanese Communist Party whose screenplays often included political themes. His scripts are frequently contrasted with those written by Shinichi Sekizawa, whose scripts for kaiju films typically had a more lightweight, "fun" tone.

Kimura considered the screenplay for Ishirō Honda's Matango to be his best work, and he considered all of his scripts from Frankenstein Conquers the World onward to be merely work for hire.

Kimura was known for having a dark and gloomy personality, and he was reportedly never very close to any of his fellow Toho employees. He died from a throat obstruction in his Tokyo apartment in 1987.
