= Shinichi Sekizawa =

Japanese screenwriter

- 関沢新一
- Born: June 2, 1920; Kyoto, Japan
- Died: November 19, 1992 (aged 72); Nanpeidaichō, Shibuya, Japan
- Occupations: Screenwriter, producer, director, assistant director
- Years active: 1949–1974
- Spouse: Masako Sekizawa
- Awards: Medal with Purple Ribbon

Shinichi Sekizawa (関沢新一, Sekizawa Shin'ichi; June 2, 1920 – November 19, 1992) was a Japanese screenwriter noted for his immense contributions to several films by Ishirō Honda, including several classic Godzilla films. He also contributed material to the original Ultraman series and several Tōei Dōga films such as Gulliver's Travels Beyond the Moon and Jack and the Witch.

His first screenplay was for the independently produced film (though distributed by Shintoho Studios) Fearful Attack of the Flying Saucers, which was also his sole directing credit.

His scripts for kaiju films have been noted for their inventiveness and for having a more lightweight, "fun" tone than those written by Takeshi Kimura (aka Kaoru Mabuchi), another leading writer of kaiju films, whose scripts had a darker, more serious sensibility.

Before starting his screenwriting career, he shortly attended an animation school with famed manga artist and animator Osamu Tezuka.

== Partial filmography ==
Note: The films listed as N/A are not necessarily chronological.

| Title | Year | Credited as | | | Notes | Ref(s) |
| Title | Year | Writer | Screen story author | Other | Notes | Ref(s) |
|---|---|---|---|---|---|---|
| Fearful Attack of the Flying Saucers | 1956 | Yes | | Yes | Both wrote and directed | |
| Varan the Unbelievable | 1958 | Yes | | | | |
| Battle in Outer Space | 1959 | Yes | | | | |
| The Last Gunfight | 1960 | Yes | | | | |
| Take Aim at the Police Van | 1960 | Yes | | | | |
| The Secret of the Telegian | 1960 | Yes | | | | |
| Moriya Hirosho no sandogasa shirizu - Nakito gozansu | 1961 | Yes | | | | |
| Mothra | 1961 | Yes | | | | |
| King Kong vs. Godzilla | 1962 | Yes | | | | |
| Warring Clans | 1963 | Yes | | | | |
| The Lost World of Sinbad | 1963 | Yes | | | | |
| Atragon | 1963 | Yes | | | | |
| Mothra vs. Godzilla | 1964 | Yes | | | | |
| Operation Lion Ant | 1964 | Yes | | | | |
| A Keg of Powder | 1964 | Yes | | | | |
| Ghidorah, the Three-Headed Monster | 1964 | Yes | | | | |
| Invasion of Astro-Monster | 1965 | Yes | | | | |
| Ebirah, Horror of the Deep | 1966 | Yes | | | | |
| Son of Godzilla | 1967 | Yes | | | | |
| Latitude Zero | 1969 | Yes | | Yes | Screenwriter in Japanese version. Credited as "Screenplay advisor" in American prints. | |
| All Monsters Attack | 1969 | Yes | | | | |
| Godzilla vs. Gigan | 1972 | Yes | | | | |
| Godzilla vs. Megalon | 1973 | | Yes | | | |
| Godzilla vs. Mechagodzilla | 1974 | | Yes | | | |
