= The War of the Gargantuas =

- Theatrical release poster

Japanese name
- Kanji: フランケンシュタインの怪獣 サンダ対ガイラ
Transcriptions
- Revised Hepburn: Furankenshutain no Kaijū: Sanda tai Gaira
- Directed by: Ishirō Honda
- Screenplay by: Ishirō Honda; Takeshi Kimura
- Based on: Frankenstein by Mary Shelley
- Produced by: Tomoyuki Tanaka; Kenichiro Tsunoda
- Starring: Russ Tamblyn; Kumi Mizuno; Kenji Sahara
- Cinematography: Hajime Koizumi
- Edited by: Ryohei Fujii
- Music by: Akira Ifukube
- Production companies: Toho Co., Ltd; UPA
- Distributed by: Toho (Japan); Maron Films (United States)
- Release dates: July 31, 1966 (Japan); July 29, 1970 (United States)
- Running time: 88 minutes
- Countries: Japan; United States
- Language: Japanese (Note: During filming, Russ Tamblyn delivered all of his lines in English and even changed many of his lines without the knowledge or the approval of director Honda. Tamblyn's dialogue was dubbed over by Gorō Mutsumi for the film's Japanese release; however, his original dialogue soundtrack was lost and Tamblyn had to re-dub all of his lines for the film's American release. Without a script and unable to remember his original lines, Tamblyn had to improvise his new lines based on the footage he was watching.)
- Box office: $3 million (United States)

The War of the Gargantuas (Japanese: フランケンシュタインの怪獣 サンダ対ガイラ, Hepburn: Furankenshutain no Kaijū: Sanda tai Gaira; lit. 'Frankenstein's Monsters: Sanda vs. Gaira') is a 1966 kaiju film directed by Ishirō Honda, with special effects by Eiji Tsuburaya. Referred by film historian Stuart Galbraith IV as a "quasi–sequel" to Frankenstein vs. Baragon, the film was a Japanese-American co-production; it was the third and final collaboration between Toho Co., Ltd and Henry G. Saperstein. The film stars Russ Tamblyn, Kumi Mizuno, and Kenji Sahara, with Yû Sekida as Sanda and Haruo Nakajima as Gaira. In the film, scientists investigate the sudden appearance of two giant Frankenstein monsters named Sanda and Gaira. It culminates in a battle in Tokyo.

The script's final draft was submitted in April 1966. Saperstein originally hired Tab Hunter to replace Nick Adams, but Tamblyn replaced Hunter during pre-production. Honda's contract was not renewed and he had to seek employment by speaking to Tanaka on a film-by-film basis. Honda, Saperstein, and chief assistant Seiji Tani noted that Tamblyn was difficult to work with. Tamblyn did the opposite of Honda's instructions, and improvised his lines without Honda's approval. Principal photography began in May 1966 and wrapped in June 1966, with effects photography concluding in July 1966.

The War of the Gargantuas was theatrically released in Japan on July 31, 1966, followed by a theatrical release in the United States on July 29, 1970 on a double feature with Monster Zero. Since its release, the film has been regarded as a cult classic, drawing admiration from artists such as Brad Pitt, Hajime Isayama, Guillermo del Toro, Quentin Tarantino, and Tim Burton.

== Plot ==
During a rainy night, a fishing boat is attacked by a giant octopus. The octopus is then attacked by a giant green-haired humanoid monster. After defeating the octopus, the green monster attacks the boat. A survivor is recovered, who reveals to doctors and police that Frankenstein attacked his boat and ate the crew. The press picks up the story and interviews Dr. Paul Stewart and his assistant, Dr. Akemi Togawa, who had a baby Frankenstein in their possession for study five years before. Stewart and Akemi dispel the idea that the attack was caused by their Frankenstein, saying their Frankenstein was gentle, would not attack or eat people, and would not live in the ocean as he was found in the mountains and likely died after he escaped.

Another boat is attacked and villagers see the green Frankenstein off the coast at the same time that a mountain guide reports seeing Frankenstein in the Japanese Alps. Stewart and Akemi investigate the mountains and find giant footprints in the snow. Their colleague, Dr. Majida, collects tissue samples from the second boat. The green Frankenstein attacks Haneda Airport, eats a woman, and returns to the sea after the clouds clear. Stewart and Akemi leave for Tokyo for a meeting with the military to discuss plans to kill the monster. Majida deduces that the green Frankenstein is sensitive to light. The green Frankenstein briefly appears in Tokyo but is driven away by bright lights. It retreats to the mountains, where the military counterattacks it. Then a brown-haired Frankenstein appears and comes to the green Frankenstein's aid, helping it escape.

Stewart and Akemi conclude that the brown Frankenstein is their former subject. To distinguish the monsters, the military name the brown and green Frankensteins Sanda and Gaira, respectively. After collecting and examining tissue samples from both, Stewart concludes that Gaira is Sanda's clone. He theorizes that a piece of Sanda's tissue made its way out to sea, where it survived off plankton and evolved into Gaira. During a hiking trip, Stewart, Akemi and several hikers run away from Gaira. Akemi falls off a ledge, but Sanda saves her in time, injuring his leg in the process. Stewart and Akemi try to convince the military that only Gaira should be killed and Sanda should be spared, but the army ignores them, unwilling to risk letting either monster live. After discovering that Gaira devoured people, Sanda attacks him. Gaira escapes with Sanda in pursuit and heads toward Tokyo, no longer deterred by the city lights as they now alert him to the presence of food.

During the evacuation, Akemi vows to save Sanda, but runs into Gaira instead. Sanda stops Gaira from devouring Akemi and Stewart carries her to safety. Sanda tries to plead with Gaira, but the green monster engages Sanda in battle. Stewart tries to convince the military to give Sanda time to defeat Gaira, but fails. However, the military aids Sanda as his battle with Gaira moves from Tokyo to Tokyo Bay and further out to sea. As the military drops bombs around the battling Frankensteins, an underwater volcano suddenly erupts, swallowing up both monsters. Majida informs Stewart and Akemi that the monsters' deaths could not be confirmed due to the intense heat, but stresses that nothing could have survived the eruption.

== Cast ==
- Russ Tamblyn as Dr. Paul Stewart
  - Gorō Mutsumi voices Paul in Japanese version
- Kumi Mizuno as Dr. Akemi Togawa
- Kenji Sahara as Dr. Yuzo Majida
- Nobuo Nakamura as Dr. Kita
- Jun Tazaki as the Army commander
- Hisaya Ito as Police Chief Izumida
- Kipp Hamilton as a club singer
- Yū Sekida as Sanda, the benevolent brown Frankenstein and one of the film's main protagonists
  - Yasuhiro Komiya as Young Sanda
- Haruo Nakajima as Gaira, the green Frankenstein, the malevolent clone of Sanda and the film's main antagonist

Cast taken from The Toho Studios Story: A History and Complete Filmography.

== Production ==
The War of the Gargantuas was the third and final co-production collaboration between Toho and Henry G. Saperstein's UPA. Toward the end of 1965, Toho told director Ishirō Honda that his director's contract would not be renewed and Iwao Mori told him he would need to speak with producer Tomoyuki Tanaka about each assignment. Seiji Tani, Honda's new chief assistant, spoke about on-set disputes between actor Russ Tamblyn and Honda, with Tamblyn often doing the exact opposite of what Honda instructed. Tani said: "Honda-san had to hold back and bear so much during that one. [Tamblyn] was such an asshole". Tamblyn felt his lines in the film were so bad that he improvised replacements. Saperstein, who chose to replace Nick Adams with Tamblyn, later said, "Tamblyn was a royal pain in the ass".

The film was originally announced as The Frankenstein Brothers, then The Two Frankensteins, Frankenstein vs. Frankenstein, Frankenstein's Decisive Battle, and Frankenstein's Fight during script writing processes. It was originally intended as a sequel to Frankenstein vs. Baragon, with Honda biographers Ryfle and Godziszewski noting that the continuity between the two films was "somewhat fuzzy". The film was created quickly, with Kimura's final draft on the screenplay dated 23 April 1966. Honda shot the film's dramatic footage between May 9 and June 4 and Tsuburaya's special effects crew finished in mid-July. The American version had Honda shoot additional scenes and UPA had Toho release the negatives, outtakes, and other footage, such as sound and music elements. Tab Hunter was originally cast as Dr. Stewart, but was replaced by Tamblyn during pre-production.

== Release ==
=== Theatrical ===
The film was released theatrically in Japan on July 31, 1966 by Toho. The Glen Glenn Sound English dub was theatrically released in the US by Maron Films as The War of the Gargantuas on July 29, 1970, as a double feature with Monster Zero, also dubbed by Glen Glenn Sound. In the UK, the film was titled Duel of the Gargantuas. The War of the Gargantuas and Monster Zero were intended to be released earlier, but distributors did not think either film had potential until 1970, when Saperstein made a deal with Maron Films.

=== Home media ===
In 2008, Classic Media released a two-disc DVD of the film as a double feature with Rodan. Both films include their original Japanese versions and American dubbed versions with Rodan presented in its native fullscreen scope and The War of the Gargantuas in its original widescreen ratio. This release also features the documentary Bringing Godzilla Down to Size, detailing the genre's history and tokusatsu techniques. In 2010, Toho released the film on Blu-ray, which includes special features such as an audio commentary by Kumi Mizuno, outtakes, trailers, and behind-the-scenes photo galleries. In 2017, Janus Films and The Criterion Collection acquired the international dub of the film, as well as Rodan and several Godzilla films, to stream on Starz and FilmStruck. The international dub was made available on HBO Max upon its launch.

=== English versions ===
Toho commissioned an English dub, referred to as the "international dub", for overseas markets. The international dub is a direct translation of the Japanese version, keeping references to the monsters as Frankensteins and having Tamblyn's English dialogue dubbed over by another actor. In 1998, film historians Stuart Galbraith IV and Steve Ryfle named Frontier Enterprises, a Tokyo-based company, as the studio that dubbed the international version. The international dub remained unreleased until late 2017, when the film Rodan and several Godzilla films appeared on Starz's streaming service after Janus Films and The Criterion Collection obtained the rights to the films.

Co-producer Henry G. Saperstein commissioned a separate English dub from Glen Glenn Sound, a Los Angeles-based company, for the film's American release. This version omits all references to Frankenstein vs. Baragon, with the creatures referred to as "Gargantuas" instead of "Frankensteins" or by their names. This version also includes additional footage not featured in the Japanese version, making the American version 92 minutes. Tamblyn's original dialogue soundtrack was lost during production and he was called back to re-dub his lines. Tamblyn worked without a script and had to improvise his lines based on the footage's lip movement as he could not remember his original lines.

== Legacy ==
The War of the Gargantuas became influential and popular among some filmmakers and actors, such as Brad Pitt, Tom Cruise, Tim Burton, and some cited the film's influences on their works, such as Hideaki Anno (Neon Genesis Evangelion), Shusuke Kaneko and Kazunori Itō (Heisei Gamera trilogy), and so on.

In 2011, manga artist Hajime Isayama cited the film's titular monsters as an inspiration for the Titans in his best-selling manga series Attack on Titan, saying: "When I was in the lower grades of elementary school, I happened to watch a film called Frankenstein's Monsters: Sanda vs. Gaira on a TV at a public hall during an evacuation drill. One of the two hairy monsters uprooted a tree and hit the other monster. That scene was really scary ... It was a long time ago, so it may not be an accurate memory, but it certainly influenced the making of the [Titans]." When filmmaker Tetsuya Nakashima was attached to direct the live-action Attack on Titan film, producer Yuji Ishida suggested that Nakashima was drawing inspiration from The War of the Gargantuas.

Mexican film director Guillermo del Toro cited The War of the Gargantuas and its predecessor Frankenstein vs. Baragon as two of his top five favorite kaiju films and cited The War of the Gargantuas as an influence on the opening of his 2013 film Pacific Rim.

In August 2019, Michael Dougherty, director and co-writer of Godzilla: King of the Monsters, expressed interest in rebooting and adapting the Gargantuas for the MonsterVerse.

=== References and parodies ===
- Footage of Gaira is used in an early flashback sequence in Godzilla Against Mechagodzilla, during which it is stated that Gaira was one of the giant monsters that attacked Japan in the years after the original Godzilla was defeated, though no mention is made of Sanda.
- Sanda and Gaira appeared in the 1972 series Ike! Godman, though their costumes were in serious disrepair. A new Gaira suit was constructed in 2008 for a direct-to-DVD short film produced for the series' 35th anniversary.
- Parts of Quentin Tarantino's 2004 film Kill Bill: Volume 2 were inspired by The War of the Gargantuas, such as a miniature shot of Tokyo made specifically for the film and the fight scene between Uma Thurman and Daryl Hannah, which Tarantino dubbed the "War of the Blonde Gargantuas". Tarantino had screened the film for Hannah and Hannah's character uses the word "gargantuan" several times.
- The Scooby-Doo! Mystery Incorporated episode "Battle of the Humungonauts" parodies the film by featuring two hairy creatures resembling Sanda and Gaira, riffing on the film's title, and even featuring a cover of Kipp Hamilton's song "The Words Get Stuck In My Throat". The Red Humungonaut's vocal effects were provided by Troy Baker and the Green Humungonaut's vocal effects by Frank Welker.
- The American band Devo performed a live version of "The Words Get Stuck In My Throat" in 1978.

== See also ==
- List of films featuring Frankenstein's monster
- List of Japanese films of 1966
- List of killer octopus films
