= Bokuzen Hidari =

Japanese actor and comedian (1894–1971)

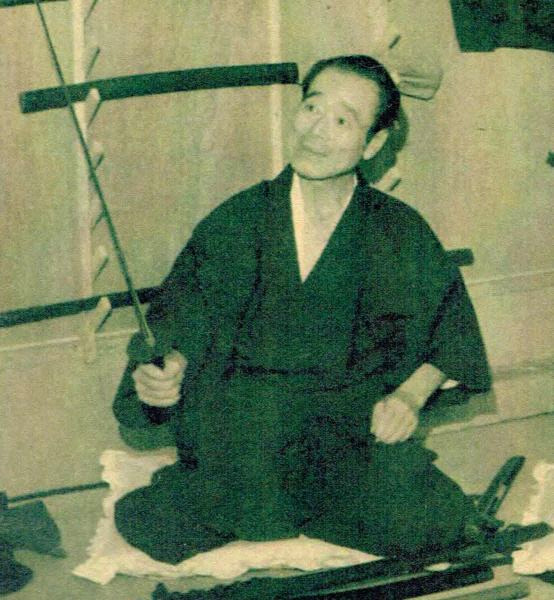
- Born: 20 February 1894; Kotesashi Village, Saitama Prefecture, Japan.
- Died: 26 May 1971 (aged 77)
- Occupation: Actor

Bokuzen Hidari (左 卜全, Hidari Bokuzen, 20 February 1894 – 26 May 1971) was a Japanese actor and comedian born in Kotesashi Village (now part of Tokorozawa), Iruma District, Saitama Prefecture, Japan. He appeared in such films as Akira Kurosawa's Seven Samurai, The Lower Depths and Ikiru. Hidari was famous among Japanese audiences for his portrayals of meek, downtrodden men, and although a teetotaller, was renowned for his convincing drunk scenes (see esp. "Ikiru").

== Filmography ==
Year	Title	Role	Notes
1950	Scandal	Drunk	
1950	Atariya Kinpachi torimonochô: senri no tora	Yasugorô alias Zuboyasu	
1950	Koshinuke nitôryû		
1950	Tenpô suiko-den: Ôtone no yogiri	Peasant	
1951	Aika		
1951	Nessa no byakuran		
1951	The Idiot	Karube	
1951	Sekirei no kyoku		
1951	Bakurô ichidai	Gosaku	
1951	Hirate Miki		
1952	Vendetta for a Samurai		
1952	Hanaogi sensei to Santa		
1952	Shino machi o nogarete	Assistant	
1952	Bijo to touzoku		
1952	Kyô wa kaisha no gekkyûbi	Section Chief	
1952	Ikiru	Ohara	
1952	Haha no nai ko to ko no nai haha to		
1952	The Man Who Came to Port	Kan-jii	
1954	Seven Samurai	Farmer Yohei	
1954	Ai to shi no tanima		
1954	Horafuki tanji	Villager Sakuji	
1955	Love Makeup	Factory owner	
1955	Tenka taihei		
1955	Keisatsu Nikki		
1955	Izumi e no michi		
1955	Mugibue		
1955	Haru no yo no dekigoto	Gen san	
1955	Wataridori itsu kaeru	Florist	
1955	Gokumonchô	Denshichi	
1955	Shônen shikeishû	Yoshizô Tarui	
1955	Wolf		
1955	Zoku Salaryman Mejiro Sampei	Sugiyama	
1955	Jibun no ana no nakade		
1955	Zoku keisatsu nikki	Komada	
1955	I Live in Fear	Landowner	
1955	The Eternal Breasts	Hide's husband	
1956	Hanayome no tameiki	Uekane	
1956	Denkô ryûsei karate uchi		
1956	Daigaku no buyuden		
1956	Gendai no yokubô	Ninagawa	
1956	The Legend of the White Serpent		
1956	Nonki fufu		
1956	Taifû sôdôki		
1956	Nemuri Kyôshirô burai hikae		
1956	Muhô monôno shima		
1957	Kingoro jyunjo niki-chinyu kyoden		
1957	Goyôkiki monogatari	Heikichi, Heikurô's father	
1957	Yagyu Secret Scrolls	Okuba	
1957	Untamed	Old man	
1957	Chieko-sho	Gohei	
1957	Daibosatsu tôge		
1957	Tôhoku no zunmu-tachi		
1957	Hatsukoi monogatari	Mr. Hashimoto	
1957	The Lower Depths	Kahei	
1957	Kunin no shikeishû	Ichitarô Nemoto	
1957	Nerawareta musume		
1957	Kaze no Matasaburô		
1958	Yagyû bugeichô: Sôryû hiken		
1958	Makeraremasen katsumadewa	Sotoyama	
1958	Kuchi kara demakase		
1958	Kajikko		
1958	The Badger Palace		
1958	Futari dake no hashi	Kawasaki	
1958	Kiuchi yasuto		
1958	Kanai anzen	Toyokichi Saeki	
1958	Daibosatsu tôge - Dai ni bu	Michihiro	
1958	Rickshaw Man		
1958	Yajikata dôchû sugoroku		
1958	Kigeki ekimae ryokan		
1958	Tsuzurikata kyodai	Nakahara	
1958	Mahiru no sangeki	Yoshida	
1958	Hana no yukyo-den		
1958	Furanki no sannin mae		
1958	Me no kabe		
1958	Kami no taisho		
1959	Gurama-to no yuwaku	Mitsumura	
1959	Kodama wa yonde iru		
1959	Daigaku no oneechan		
1959	Kotan no kuchibue		
1959	Kitsune to tanuki		
1959	Daibosatsu tôge - Kanketsu-hen	Michihiko	
1959	Sarariman shussetai koki daiyonbu		
1959	Suppadaka no nenrei	Gen-ji	
1959	Mi wa jukushitari	Sales man	
1959	Kashimanada no onna		
1959	The Three Treasures	God Amenominaka	
1959	Kôdo nanasen metoru: kyôfu no yojikan	Flight Passenger - Elderly Husband	
1960	Shin santô jûyaku: Tabi to onna to sake no maki		
1960	Salary man Mejiro Sanpei: Teishu no tameiki no maki	Travelling seller	
1960	Yurei Hanjo-ki		
1960	Taiyô no hakaba	Peddlar	
1960	Dare yori mo kimi o aisu	Monk Saikô	
1960	Shosuke buyuden aizu bandaisan		
1960	Oneechan wa tsuiteru ze		
1960	The Human Vapor	Fujichiyo's guardian	
1961	Botchan yaro seizoroi		
1961	Fûryû kokkei-tan: Sennin buraku		
1961	Shachô dôchûki		
1961	Daigaku no wakadaishô		
1961	Shingo nijuban shobu dainibu		
1961	Kawa jean blues		
1961	Kigeki: ekimae danchi		
1961	Gen to fudômyô-ô		
1961	Shindo no shacho shirizu: Jirocho shacho yosakoi dochu		
1961	Wakai yatsura no kaidan	Heisaku	
1961	Sennin Buraku	Doctor	
1962	Nippon no obaachan	Seki	
1962	Jirocho shacho to Ishimatsuhain: Ifu dodo		
1962	Ginza no wakadaishô		
1962	Akai tsubomi to shiroi hana	Dr. Fujibayashi	
1962	Ao beka monogatari		
1962	Nihon ichi no wakadaishô		
1962	Kigeki ekimae onsen		
1962	Kare raisu		
1962	Burari burabura monogatari		
1962	Yabai koto nara zeni ni naru	Sakamoto	
1963	Otoko ippiki dochuki		
1963	Sarariman monogatari: Katta kuru zoto isamashitaku		
1963	Onsen geisha	Ichisuke	
1963	Shitamachi no taiyô	Zensuke	
1963	Chintao yôsai bakugeki meirei		
1963	Kigeki ekimae chagama		
1963	Hawai no wakadaishô		
1963	Hiken		
1963	Gyangu Chûshingura		
1963	Hachigatsu umare no Onna		
1964	Shachô shinshiroku		
1964	Zûzûshii yatsu	Count Karasuma	
1964	Otoko girai	Priest	
1964	Zoku shachô shinshiroku		
1964	Geisha gakkô		
1964	Three Outlaw Samurai	Sakusan	
1964	Dojo yaburi		
1964	Zatoichi's Flashing Sword	Kyubei	
1964	Garakuta		
1964	Akai daiya		
1965	Red Beard	Patient A	
1965	Sanshiro Sugata	Priest	
1965	Chinkoro amakko	Gosaku	
1965	Kuroi tobakushi: Daisu de korose		
1965	Gamera: The Giant Monster	Old Farmer	
1965	Yoru no akujo		
1966	Black Tight Killers	Momochi	
1966	Nippon ichi no gorigan otoko		
1966	Izuko e		
1966	Otoko nante nanisa	Yoshida	
1966	Kigeki ekimae manga		
1966	Ohana han	Gosuke	part 1, 2
1966	Ahendaichi jigokubutai totsugekseyo		
1967	Zoku izuko e	Stationmaster	
1967	Kigeki ekimae gakuen		
1967	Kigeki: Kyûkô ressha		
1967	Minami taiheiyo no wakadaishô		
1967	Kureji no Kaitô Jibako	Right-wing sword maker	
1967	Kigeki: Dantai ressha		
1967	Two in the Shadow		
1967	Nureta aibiki		
1968	Rio no wakadaishô		
1968	Sukurappu shûdan		
1968	Kigeki hatsumoude resha	Boss of printing company	
1969	Go! Go! Wakadaishô	Old Man Onashi	
1969	Furesshuman wakadaishô		
1969	Maruhi sei to seikatsu		
1969	Kigeki ekimae sanbashi	Shinsaku	
1969	Shôwa zankyô-den: Karajishi jingi		
1969	Yokai Monsters: Along with Ghosts	Jinbei	
1969	Oretachi no kôya		
1969	Aru joshi kôkôi no kiroku zoku ninshin		
1969	Red Lion	Gohei	
1969	Yoru no kayô series: Onna		
1969	Konto Gojugo-go: Uchu daibôken		
1969	Namida no kisetsu		
1969	Kiki kaikai ore wa dareda?!	Dr. Ôyabu	
1970	Otoko wa tsurai yo: Fûten no Tora	Toku	
1970	Zoku shachô gaku ABC		
1970	Tokyo Pari - Seishun no joken		
1970	Ore no sora da ze! Wakadaishô		
1970	Kigeki aa gunka		
1970	Tora-san, His Tender Love	Toto-chan, Japan's richest man	
1970	Boku wa gosai		
1970	Kigeki-dai oyabun		
1970	Harenchi gakuen: Takkuru kissu no maki		
1971	Suppon onnabancho		
1971	Kigeki Kaiun ryokô		
1971	Kigeki onna wa otoko no furusatoyo		(final film role)
