= The Man Who Came to Port =

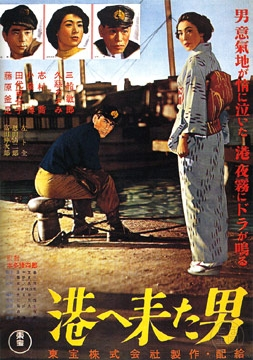
- Original Japanese movie poster
- Directed by: Ishirō Honda
- Screenplay by: Ishirō Honda; Masahige Narizawa
- Based on: Dance of the Stormy Waves by Shinzo Kajino
- Produced by: Tomoyuki Tanaka
- Starring: Toshiro Mifune; Asami Kuji; Takashi Shimura; Hiroshi Koizumi
- Cinematography: Taiichi Kankura
- Music by: Ichirō Saitō
- Production company: Toho
- Distributed by: Toho
- Release date: November 27, 1952 (Japan)
- Running time: 88 minutes
- Country: Japan

The Man Who Came to Port (港へ来た男, Minato e kita otoko) is a 1952 Japanese film directed by Ishirō Honda. It is based on the story Dance of the Stormy Waves by Shinzo Kajino. The film was both produced and distributed by Toho, and released theatrically in Japan on November 27, 1952.

== Plot ==
At a port near Mt. Kinka, the only whaling base in Japan, Okabe, the captain of the whaling ship Tianjin Maru, said that he would settle the past prodigal life and seek a stable life in old age by his daughter Sonoko, who has a reputation for the town's restaurant Kiraku. It was sent to Maru's young driver Shinuma. Okabe hit eight on Shinuma because he went out and missed a big whale, but that night Shinuma was drunk and made a big blow to Okabe. As a result, Shinuma was newly assigned as the captain of the Tokumaru, and the natural Tianjin Maru and the Tokumaru were competing for fishing. Shingo Nishizawa, who gave birth to a woman Okabe abandoned a long time ago, has longed for her father, but she was attached to Shinuma with love for her father who was fighting for a woman against Niinuma. However, when Okabe's ship ran aground in stormy weather, Shinuma and Shingo bet their lives and rescued the crew of the Tianjin Maru. There is a man-to-man relationship, and on the deck of the new ship that will soon sail to the Southern Ocean, the bright smiles of Okabe, Shinuma, and Shingo are lined up, and Sonoko and Shingo's lover Akemi are on the pier to see off.

== Cast ==
- Toshiro Mifune as Goro Niinuma
- Asami Kuji as Sonoko
- Hiroshi Koizumi as Shingo Nishizawa
- Bokuzen Hidari as Kanjī
- Yuriko Tashiro as Akemi
- Kamatari Fujiwara as Takasaki
- Ren Imaizumi as Yamashita
- Senkichi Ōmura as Harada
- Yaeko Izumo as Ohide
- Nakajiro Tomita as Katsuki
- Seijiro Onda as Miyake
- Takashi Shimura as Okabe
- Kin Sugai
- Sachio Sakai
- Shoichi Hirose

== Bibliography ==
- Galbraith IV, Stuart (2008). The Toho Studios Story: A History and Complete Filmography. Scarecrow Press. ISBN 9781461673743.
