= Wakai =

Wakai (written: 若井) is a Japanese surname. Notable people with the surname include:

- Atsuko Wakai (若井 敦子, born 1971), Japanese karateka
- Glenn Wakai (born 1967), American politician
- Kenji Wakai (若井 研治, born 1974), Japanese footballer
- Atsuko Wakai (若井 敦子, Wakai Atsuko, born 1971) Japanese practitioner
- Wakai ki (若い樹) (lit. 'A Young Tree') Japanese film directed

== See also ==
- Wakai Station, a railway station in Kōchi Prefecture, Japan
