= Be Happy, These Two Lovers =

- Film poster
- Directed by: Ishirō Honda
- Written by: Zenzo Matsuyama
- Produced by: Shirō Horie
- Starring: Hiroshi Koizumi; Yumi Shirakawa; Keiko Tsushima
- Cinematography: Hajime Koizumi
- Music by: Yoshinao Nakada
- Distributed by: Toho
- Release date: February 19, 1957 (Japan)
- Running time: 97 minutes
- Country: Japan
- Language: Japanese

Be Happy, These Two Lovers (Japanese: この二人に幸あれ, Hepburn: Kono futari ni sachi are; lit. Good Luck to These Two) is a 1957 Japanese film directed by Ishirō Honda.

== Cast ==
- Hiroshi Koizumi
- Yumi Shirakawa
- Keiko Tsushima
- Toshiro Mifune
- Kamatari Fujiwara
- Takashi Shimura
- Shizue Natsukawa
- Yuriko Hide
- Tamae Kiyokawa
- Takeo Oikawa
- Hirota Kisaragi
- Yoshifumi Tajima
- Sumiko Koizumi
- Yū Fujiki

== Bibliography ==
- Galbraith IV, Stuart (2008). The Toho Studios Story: A History and Complete Filmography. Scarecrow Press. ISBN 9781461673743.
