= Tōkyō no hito sayōnara =

1956 Japanese film directed by Ishirō Honda

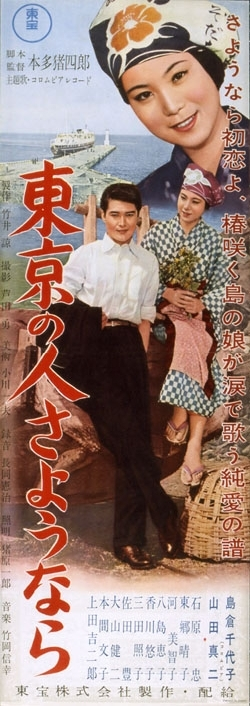
- Directed by: Ishirō Honda
- Screenplay by: Ishirō Honda
- Starring: Chiyoko Shimakura; Shinji Yamada; Kiijiro Ueda
- Cinematography: Isamu Ashida
- Music by: Nobuyuki Kateoka
- Production company: Toho
- Distributed by: Toho
- Release date: 28 June 1956
- Running time: 62 minutes
- Country: Japan

Tōkyō no hito sayōnara (東京の人さようなら transl. People of Tokyo, Goodbye) is a 1956 Japanese film directed by Ishirō Honda. The film is about young lovers trying to listen to their heart despite their parent's interjecting.

== Production ==
The film is the first of three short feature films starring the enka singer Chiyoko Shimakura. These films were made in conjunction with Ryo Takei's company Sogei Pro. According to Honda, the film was made at a time when Toho was "trying everything out" which led to building a film around Chiyoko Shimakura. Honda commented later on the era saying he "tried [his] best at whatever kind of thing would come my way instead of rejecting something that might not have been for me."

== Release ==
Tōkyō no hito sayōnara was distributed theatrically by Toho on 28 June 1956.

== Bibliography ==
- Galbraith IV, Stuart (2008). The Toho Studios Story: A History and Complete Filmography. Scarecrow Press. ISBN 9781461673743.
- Ryfle, Steve; Godziszewski, Ed (2017). Ishiro Honda: A Life in Film, from Godzilla to Kurosawa. Wesleyan University Press. ISBN 9780819570871.
