= A Teapicker's Song of Goodbye =

- Original Japanese movie poster
- Directed by: Ishirō Honda
- Distributed by: Toho
- Release date: 1957 (Japan)
- Country: Japan
- Language: Japanese

A Teapicker's Song of Goodbye (Japanese: 別れの茶摘歌, Hepburn: Wakare no chatsumi-uta) is a 1957 Japanese film directed by Ishirō Honda.

The film's production company, Toho, distributed another Honda film, titled A Farewell to the Woman Called My Sister, at the same time as A Teapicker's Song of Goodbye. Both films were in black and white.
