= Oen-san =

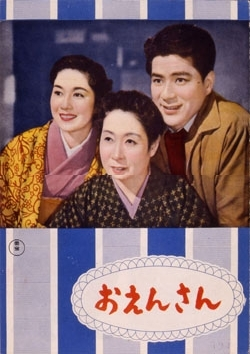
- Original Japanese movie poster
- Directed by: Ishirō Honda
- Produced by: Tomoyuki Tanaka
- Distributed by: Toho
- Release date: 1955 (Japan)
- Running time: 99 minutes
- Country: Japan
- Language: Japanese

Mother and Son (Japanese: 母と息子, Oen-san) is a 1955 Japanese drama film directed by Ishirō Honda and produced by Toho.

Adapted from a Shinpa stage play, the film follows Oen, a widowed fishwife whose possessiveness towards her adult son Hiroshi threatens both his engagement and her chance at rekindling a lost love.

== Plot ==
Oen, a widowed fish seller, works at Tokyo’s Tsukiji Fish Market with her adult son Hiroshi. Hiroshi is engaged to his longtime sweetheart Tamako, and the couple plans to build a new home together. Although the engagement is welcomed by those around them, Oen becomes increasingly troubled by the prospect of losing her son and begins meddling in their wedding plans.

Oen’s involvement escalates as she questions Hiroshi’s decisions and disrupts his efforts to establish an independent household. When Tani, an old acquaintance who once hoped to marry Oen, returns from Brazil and expresses renewed interest, she ignores him, remaining focused on keeping Hiroshi close.

Hiroshi grows conflicted as he tries to balance his loyalty to his mother with his commitment to Tamako. After Oen scuttles the wedding arrangements, Tamako reluctantly agrees to marry another man. Hiroshi falls into despair, and when he gets into a drunken streetfight with Tamako’s new fiancé and his friends, he is badly beaten.

During Hiroshi’s recovery, he and Tamako reconcile. As the couple prepares to move forward with their lives, Oen watches Tani depart by plane, left to face the changes in her family alone.

== Cast ==
- Yaeko Mizutani as Oen
- Hiroshi Koizumi as Hiroshi
- Yoko Tsukasa as Tamako
- Masao Shimizu as Tani

== Production ==
Director Ishiro Honda was originally scheduled to shoot Half Human (1955), but as special effects director Eiji Tsuburaya was busy on Godzilla Raids Again (1955), filming was halted and Honda proceeded with directing Mother and Son.

Toho Producer Iwao Mori encouraged Honda to make a film targeted at women, taking inspiration from Shinpa. Screenwriter Dai Nishijima adapted the story from a Shinpa stage play. Yaeko Mizutani (Oen) had begun acting in the 1920s in Shinpa theater and silent films.

== Release ==
Mother and Son was released in Japan by Toho on June 7th, 1955.
