= Song for a Bride =

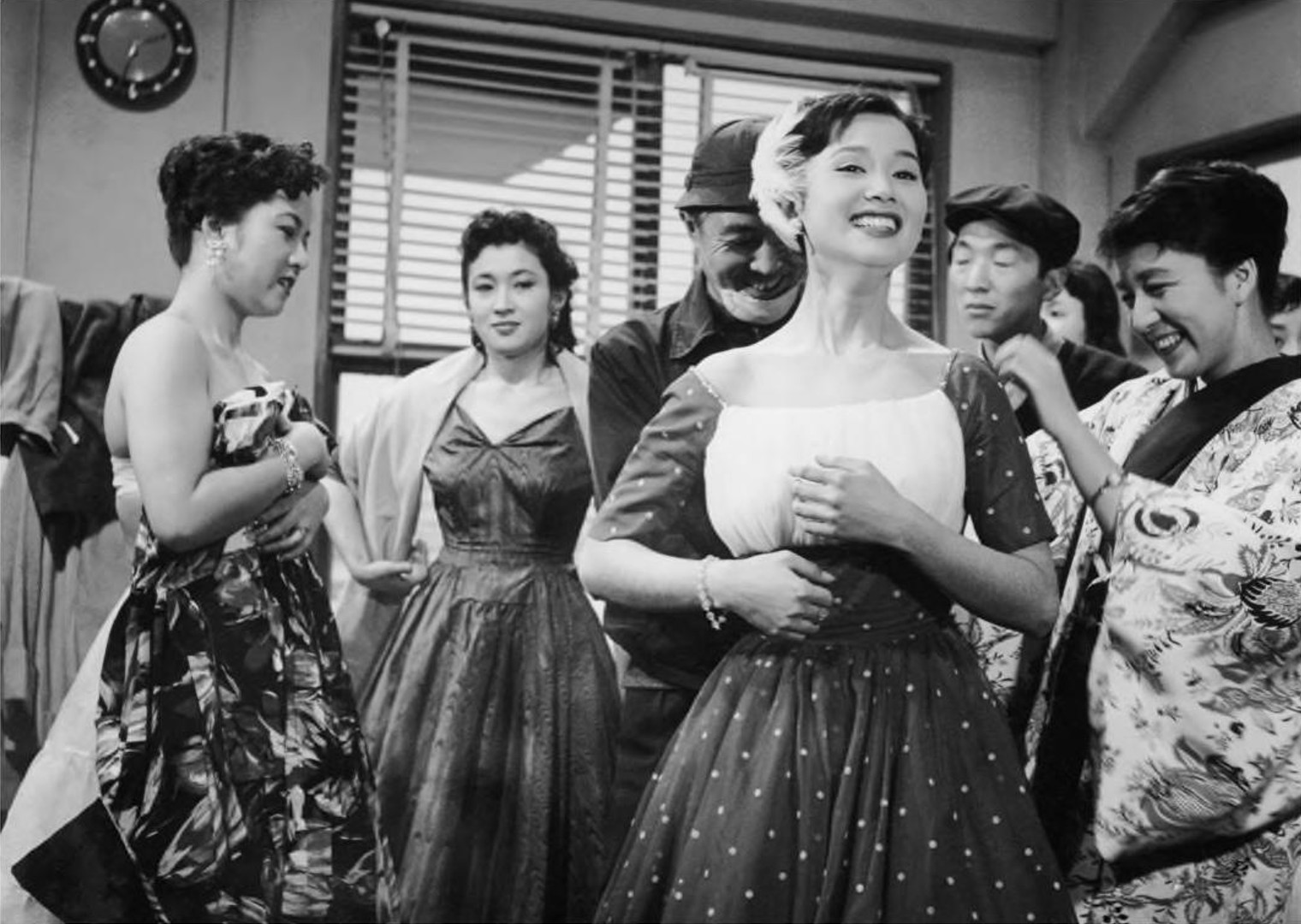
- Director Ishirō Honda attending to details on Reiko Dan's fashion show costume during production.
- Directed by: Ishirō Honda
- Written by: Tokuhei Wakao
- Produced by: Toho; Sanezumi Fujimoto
- Starring: Mitsuko Kusabue; Akemi Negishi; Reiko Dan; Hiroshi Koizumi
- Cinematography: Hajime Koizumi
- Music by: Masaru Sato
- Distributed by: Toho
- Release date: February 11, 1958
- Country: Japan
- Language: Japanese

Song for a Bride (花嫁三重奏, Hanayome sanjuso) is a 1958 black-and-white Japanese film directed by Ishirō Honda.

== Cast ==
- Hiroshi Koizumi as Okamoto
- Mitsuko Kusabue
- Akemi Negishi
- Reiko Dan
- Kenji Sahara
- Yoshio Tsuchiya
- Sachio Sakai as Kurokawa
- Fumiko Okamura
- Daijirō Natsukawa
- Toshiko Nakano
- Yutaka Nakayama
- Keiko Muramatsu
- Akiko Wakabayashi
- Daisuke Inoue
- Kingoro Yanagiya

== Release ==
Song for a Bride was released on February 11, 1958.

== Reception ==
In a retrospective review, Steve Ryfle and Ed Godziszewski declared the film "one of Honda's most thoroughly entertaining film" that "showcases Honda's flair for comedy in ways similar to Mothra and King Kong vs. Godzilla" had."

== Bibliography ==
- Ryfle, Steve; Godziszewski, Ed (2017). Ishiro Honda: A Life in Film, from Godzilla to Kurosawa. Wesleyan University Press. ISBN 9780819570871.
