= Farewell Rabaul =

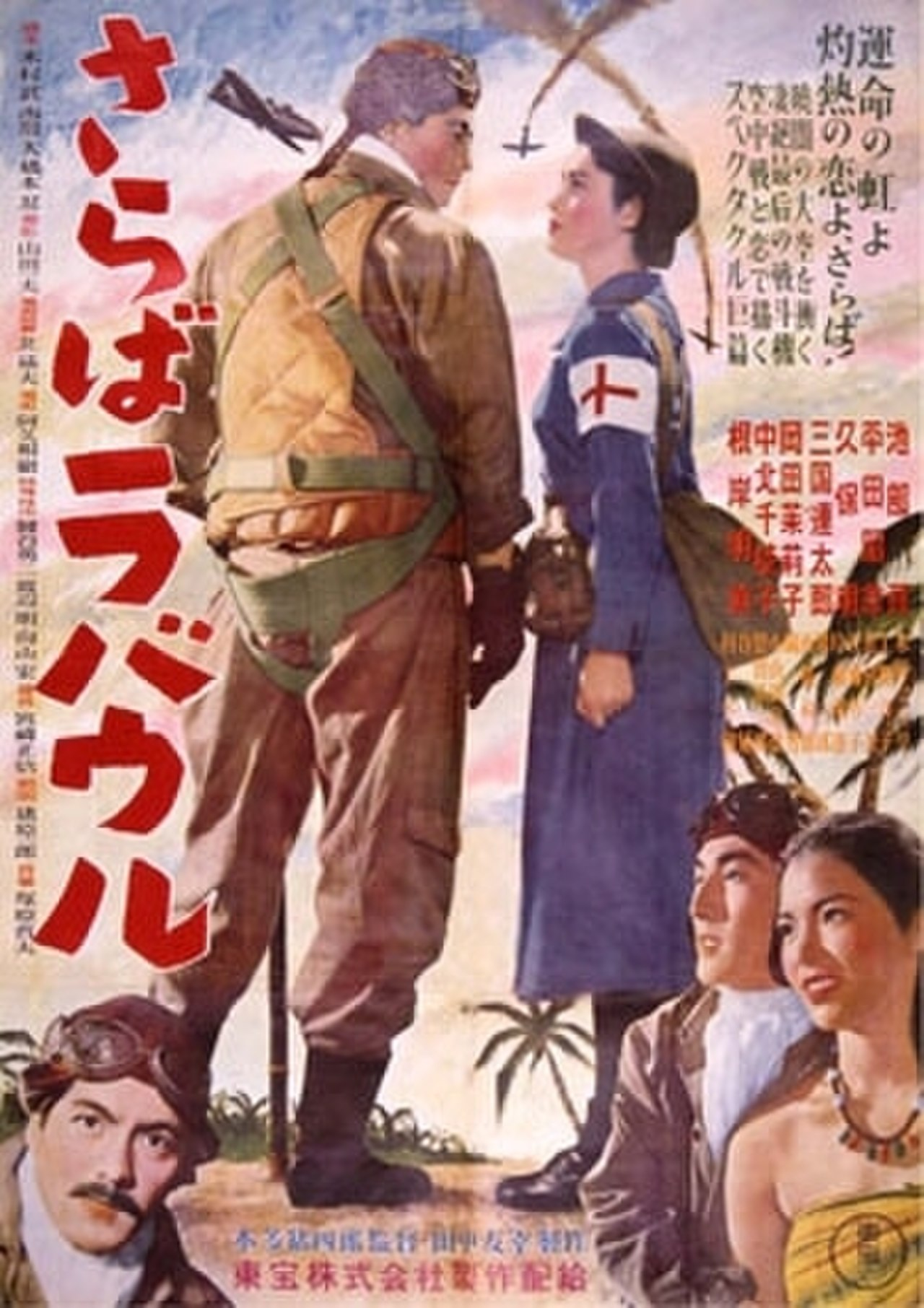
- Theatrical release poster
- Directed by: Ishirō Honda
- Written by: Takeo Murata
- Produced by: Tomoyuki Tanaka
- Distributed by: Toho
- Release date: 10 February 1954 (Japan)
- Country: Japan
- Language: Japanese

Farewell Rabaul (さらばラバウル, Saraba Rabauru) is a 1954 Japanese war film directed by Ishirō Honda, with special effects by Eiji Tsuburaya

== Cast ==
- Ryō Ikebe
- Rentaro Mikuni
- Akihiko Hirata
- Mariko Okada
