= Half Human =

1955 Japanese film

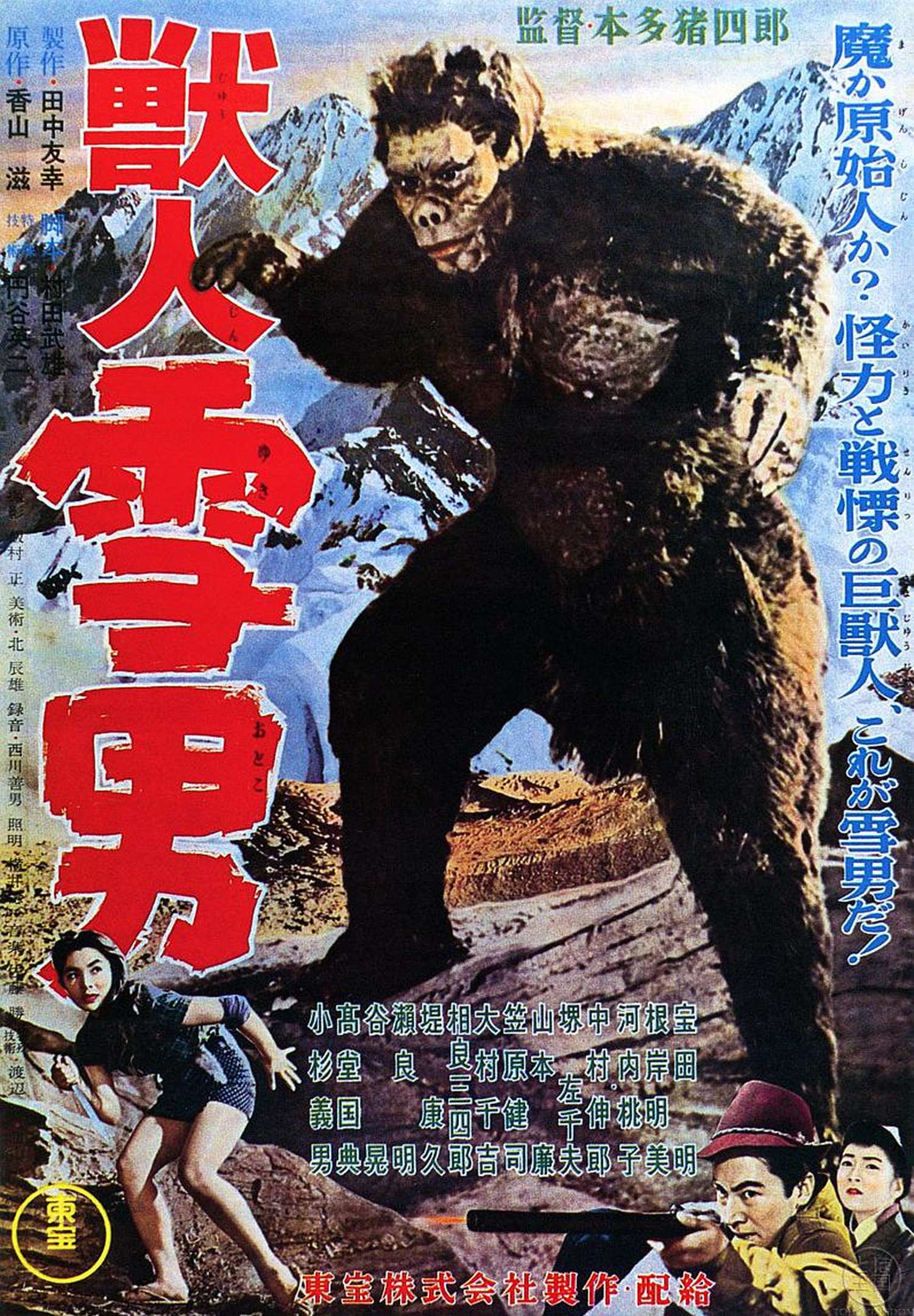
- Theatrical release poster

Japanese name
- Kanji: 獣人雪男
Transcriptions
- Revised Hepburn: Jūjin Yuki Otoko
- Directed by: Ishirō Honda
- Screenplay by: Takeo Murata
- Story by: Shigeru Kayama
- Produced by: Tomoyuki Tanaka
- Starring: Akira Takarada; Momoko Kochi; Akemi Negishi; Sachio Sakai; Nobuo Nakamura
- Cinematography: Tadashi Iimura
- Music by: Masaru Sato
- Production company: Toho
- Distributed by: Toho
- Release date: 14 August 1955 (Japan)
- Running time: 95 minutes
- Country: Japan
- Language: Japanese

Half Human (獣人雪男, Jūjin Yuki Otoko; lit. 'Beastman Snowman') is a 1955 Japanese science fiction horror film directed by Ishirō Honda, with special effects by Eiji Tsuburaya. The film stars Akira Takarada, Momoko Kōchi, Akemi Negishi, Sachio Sakai, and Nobuo Nakamura, with Sanshiro Sagara as the Abominable Snowman. The film was released in Japan in 1955, and in the US (cut to 70 minutes) on May 22, 1957 (retitled Half Human), on a double feature with Monster from Green Hell (1957).

== Plot ==
The Japanese version is told in flashbacks framed by scenes of a reporter questioning the survivors.

During New Year's, Five young university students come to the Japanese Alps in Nagano for a skiing vacation. They are Takashi Iijima, his girlfriend Machiko Takeno, her older brother Kiyoshi Takeno, and their friends Nakada and Kaji. When they arrive, Kiyoshi and Kaji split off and visit their mutual friend, Gen, promising to meet the others later at the lodge. Takashi, Michiko, and Nakada arrive at the lodge, whose caretaker informs them of an approaching blizzard.

The caretaker telephones Gen's cabin, but nobody answers, worrying the group. While Takashi takes over the phone, a fur-coat-clad young woman named Chika, who lives in a village deep in the mountains, enters. Growing up in a village that shuns contact with outsiders, Chika is none too pleased to see so many visitors but reluctantly takes shelter from the storm nonetheless.

The sound of an avalanche thundering down a nearby slope terrifies the group. The lodge telephone rings. Michiko picks up the phone but drops it in horror. Through the earpiece comes the sound of screams, followed by a single gunshot. When Takashi picks up the receiver, he hears another agonized scream and the line goes dead. Chika puts her coat back on and slips away.

The next day, as soon as the weather clears, a rescue party goes off to find Gen and Kaji. Kiyoshi is nowhere to be found. Gen is dead on the cabin floor while Kaji's body has been dragged out into the snow. Their injuries suggest they were attacked by something far stronger than a man.

Takashi and Nakata find strange tufts of hair around the cabin, as though whatever had left them was absurdly large. Most disturbing of all are the enormous bare footprints leading off into the snow. The team splits up, one group brings the bodies back to the lodge and the other continues searching for Kiyoshi. By nightfall, there is still no sign of Kiyoshi and the rescue team leader announces that they will have to return to Tōkyo until the snow thaws.

Six months later, when the snow has thawed enough for a proper search, Takashi and Machiko join an expedition to the Japanese Alps led by anthropologist Professor Shigeki Koizumi. The two have come to terms with the possibility of Kiyoshi's death, but are determined to find out what happened. Koizumi's goal, also the expedition's main focus, is to verify the existence of an unknown bipedal primate lurking in the area.

As the group arrives, it is revealed they are not the only one interested Koizumi is not the only one interested in the unknown creature. Ōba, an unscrupulous animal broker, is also in the area to search for a rumored special animal. He intends to trail the expedition and use them to search for his target. The expedition gets further into the mountains, observed by a third party - an old man and his companion.

One night, as Koizumi's group rests in their camp, an ape-like creature reaches into Machiko's tent and touches her face, causing her to wake up and scream. The Snowman runs into the forest, pursued by Takashi, who loses his way and takes a bad fall. As he hobbles back to what he thought was the expedition's camp, he stumbles upon Ōba's camp. Ōba's men beat him up and casually toss him into a deep ravine.

Takashi is alive and found by Chika, who brings him to her village. The place has been isolated from the outside world for generations, resulting in the population becoming inbred and disfigured. Seeing an outsider, the villagers become agitated. The village chief calms them down and sends Chika away to bring an offering to the Snowman, whom the villagers worship as a deity. After she is gone, the villagers hang Takashi off a cliff to be eaten by the vultures. Upon returning and finding Takashi gone, Chika confronts her grandfather, only to get reprimanded and viciously beaten up.

Going off to nurse her wound, Chika runs into Ōba's group. Mistaking them for Koizumi's party out looking for Takashi, she agrees to share the Snowman's location. Ōba gifts her a ring, and in return, she shows him the direction by throwing a stone across the valley. Approaching the creature's lair, Ōba discovers a juvenile Snowman playing by the cave entrance. They promptly capture it to use as bait.

Meanwhile, the Snowman is on his way back to its cave with a fresh kill, when it spots Takashi hanging off a cliff by a rope. The beast pulls him up, unties him, and walks away. When the Snowman comes back to its cave, Ōba's group successfully traps and tranquilizes the creature.

Back in the village, Chika is punished once again. She admits to telling outsiders about the Snowman's lair. The villagers arrive at the cave when Ōba's group prepares the beast for transport. When the village chief tries to intervene, Ōba shoots him. As they drag the Snowman away, its child slips out of his bonds. It catches up with the truck and undoes the rope tying the adult Snowman. Soon, the adult Snowman wakes up and begins to break his way out of the cage. In the ensuing chaos, all of Ōba's henchmen are dead, and Ōba fatally shoots the juvenile Snowman. The adult grabs Ōba and throws him to a gruesome death. With its offspring dead, the Snowman, enraged and full of grief, runs back to the village and destroys it.

Takashi survives and manages to get back to the camp, but the Snowman takes Machiko. Following smoke in the distance, the expedition finds smoldering remnants of the village. Chika tells them about what happened and leads them to the Snowman's cave. There, they find Kiyoshi's remains and fragments of his journal. Kiyoshi had been tracking the creature when he was caught in an avalanche. The Snowman had saved his life and sheltered him. Further into the cave, the party finds a large pile of bones of other Snowmen. Finding poisonous mushrooms, Koizumi speculates that these caused their deaths.

The creature storms in with Machiko over his shoulder. They chase the beast further into the cave, until it stops by a pit of boiling sulfur. Chika comes to the rescue, attacking the Snowman with her knife; she distracts the creature enough that Takashi is able to get a clear shot at it. The mortally wounded Snowman grabs Chika and drags her down with him as he plunges into the sulfur pit to certain death.

== Cast ==
=== Japanese version ===
- Akira Takarada as Takeshi Iijima
- Momoko Kochi as Machiko Takeno
- Akemi Negishi as Chika
- Nobuo Nakamura as Professor Tanaka
- Sachio Sakai as Nakata
- Kokuten Kodo as the old man
- Yoshio Kosugi as Oba
- Kenji Kasahara as Kodama
- Ren Yamamoto as Shinagawa
- Koji Suzuki as Kurihara
- Akira Sera as Matsui
- Tadashi Okabe as Machiko's brother
- Ichiro Chiba as Police chief
- Kamayuki Tsubono as mountain guide
- Senkichi Omura as a villager
- Kihachi Okamoto as member of the mountain search party
- Haruo Nakajima as member of the mountain search party
- Shoichi Hirose as member of the mountain search party
- Sanshiro Sagara as the Snowman
- Takashi Ito as the Snowman's offspring

The cast from the Japanese version of the film are taken from the official Ishirō Honda website.

=== American version ===
- John Carradine as Dr. John Rayburn
- Russell Thorson as Prof. Philip Osborne
- Robert Karnes as Prof. Alan Templeton
- Morris Ankrum as Dr. Carl Jordan

The cast from the American version of the film are taken from The Japanese Filmography: 1900 through 1994.

== Production ==
=== Crew ===
- Ishirō Honda (Note: Credited as "Inoshiro Honda" in the American version of the film.) – director
- Eiji Tsuburaya (Note: Credited as "Eigi Tsuburaya" in the American version of the film.) – special effects director
- Kihachi Okamoto – assistant director
- Minoru Sakamoto – associate producer
- Shoichi Yokoi – lighting
- Tatsuo Kita – art director
- Akira Watanabe – special effects art director
- Masao Shirota – special effects lighting
- Hiroshi Mukoyama – optical effects
- Yoshio Nishikawa – sound recording

Personnel taken the official Ishirō Honda website.

=== Development ===
Before Godzilla had been released, Toho had already planned its next monster movie with Honda attached to direct it. Half Human was part of a mini-cycle of topical films influenced by Eric Shipton's photographs of large footprints found in the snow at Mount Everest in 1951. These included the 1954 American film The Snow Creature and the 1957 British film The Abominable Snowman.

Writer Shigeru Kayama was hired to write the original script and completed his treatment on October 16, 1954. The film began under the working title of S-Project (S for Snowman) with the production being officially announced in November with the title Snowman of the Alps. Screenwriter Takeo Murata began working on the project at the same time as Godzilla Raids Again.

=== Filming ===
Honda went to Tokyo to shoot Half Human's scenes with snow and on returning found that special effects director Eiji Tsuburaya was busy working on Godzilla Raids Again, which put Half Human on hold while Honda began filming Mother and Son. Half Human resumed filming in June and July and was released on August 14.

== Release ==
Half Human was released in Japan by Toho on August 14, 1955, as a double feature with Three Brides for Three Sons. Toho has not acknowledged the matter of the film's release. Honda biographers Steve Ryfle and Ed Godziszewski suggested the film was not released to avoid backlash from burakumin's rights groups such as the Buraku Liberation League, the film being removed from distribution for decades as a result. Some sources indicate it was aired on Japanese television in either the 1960s or early 1970s and the film received a screening at a film retrospective in Kyoto in 2001. As of 2017, a complete version of the film has never been released by Toho in any home video format.

=== American version ===
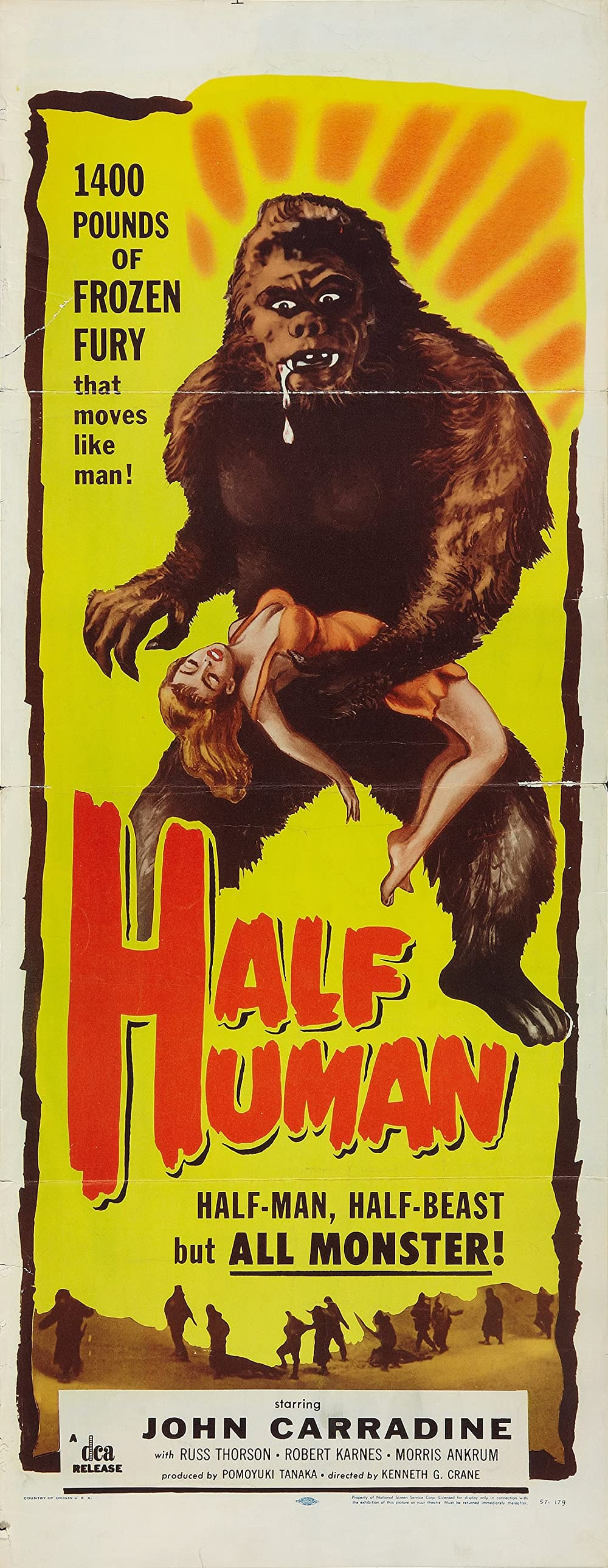
American poster

For the American version of the film, the American company Distributors Corporation of America (DCA) added English-language scenes and narration. The American version of the film contains the original Japanese footage with scenes of John Carradine as John Rayburn explaining the Snowman to his colleagues. The new footage was directed by Kenneth G. Crane on two different sets over the course of two days.

Crane also directed Monster from Green Hell, which was released by DCA on May 23, 1957 as a double feature with Half Human (1957) for its US release. This version also removes Sato's film score.

The American version features a scene where Carradine reveals the corpse of the Snowman's son on a morgue slab, and the corpse was portrayed by the costume used for the Snowman's son in the original Japanese film, which Toho shipped to the U.S. for filming.

== Reception ==
Honda biographers Ryfle and Godziszewski noted that, though the film was "not Honda's best work", the original Japanese version is far superior to the more widely seen American version of the film. They declared the film to suffer from "weak plotting, thin characters, and distracting humor" Online film database AllMovie described the American version of the film as "Another example of a fairly interesting Japanese monster film rendered nearly incomprehensible by ham-fisted editing and substandard English dubbing" and that Honda's original edit "was marginally more interesting, though Honda would soon fare better with monsters of the scaly, radioactive variety." The movie inspired Loren Coleman to begin his pursuit of cryptozoology.

== See also ==
- Prophecies of Nostradamus
- "From Another Planet with Love"
