= Aoi Shinju =

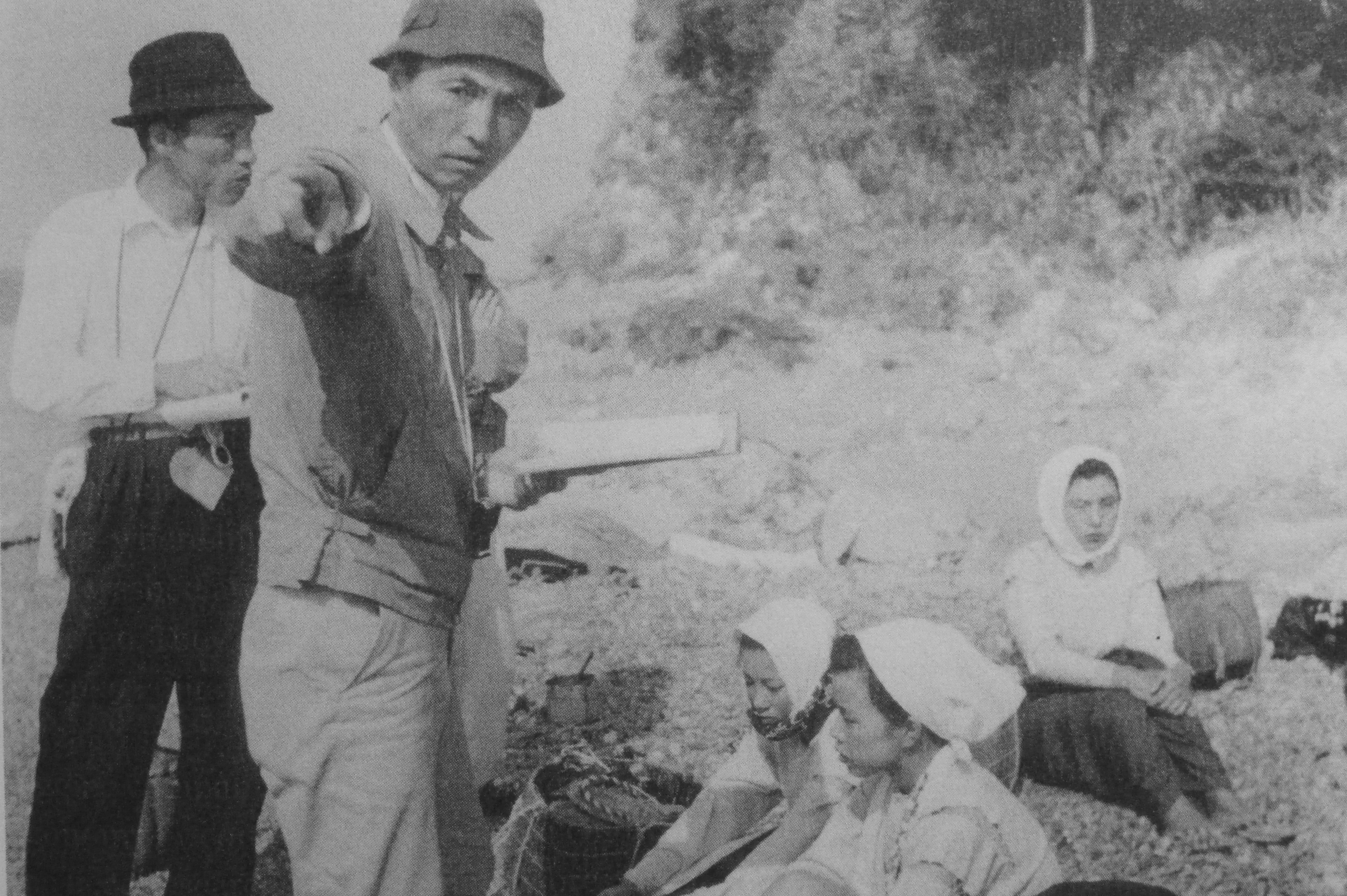
- Ishirō Honda directing native ama divers as extras during production.
- Directed by: Ishirō Honda
- Screenplay by: Ishirō Honda
- Based on: Umi no haien by Katsuro Yamada
- Produced by: Sojiro Motoki
- Starring: Ryō Ikebe; Yukiko Shimazki; Yuriko Hamada; Takashi Shimura
- Cinematography: Tadashi Iimura
- Music by: Tadashi Hattori
- Production company: Toho Co., Ltd
- Distributed by: Toho
- Release date: 3 August 1951 (Japan)
- Running time: 97 minutes
- Country: Japan

Aoi Shinju (Japanese: 青い真珠; lit. 'The Blue Pearl') is a 1951 Japanese film directed by Ishirō Honda, his first feature film. The story is based on Umi no haien (lit. 'The Decedent Paradise of the Sea''). It is about a pearl divers and is filmed in a semi-documentary style. The film was produced and distributed by Toho Co., Ltd in Japan on August 3, 1951.

== Plot ==
Young ama diver Noe (Yukiko Shimazki) falls in love with the town's new lighthouse attendant/school teacher Nishida (Ryō Ikebe), who recently moved in from Tokyo. Nishida's outsider ways inspire Noe to abandon her unwanted arranged marriage and hard life of diving. The couple's love is scorn by the locals and the two are split apart by Riu (Yuriko Hamada), a former ama diver, who returns from Tokyo after 2 years. Noe's parents forbid her from seeing Nishida and Riu seduces Nishida in her absence, spreading rumors that Noe is pregnant with his bastard child. The two women try to settle their score by diving to retrieve the legendary Dai nichi ido pearl, said to bring about true love, however, the locals fear it is cursed and should be left undisturbed. Riu finds the pearl but her hand gets stuck between rocks and drowns. Noe nearly drowns trying to save Riu. Believing her responsible for Riu's death, the villagers demonize Noe, who is guilt-ridden and haunted by the voice of Riu calling from the sea. The film ends with Noe advancing the sea, following Riu's haunting cries.

== Cast ==
- Yukiko Shimazaki as Noe
- Ryō Ikebe as Nishida
- Yuriko Hamada as Riu
- Sachio Sakai as Yanagiya
- Takashi Shimura as lighthouse keeper

== Themes ==
In their biography of Honda, film historians Steve Ryfle and Ed Godziszewski note that the film features characters that challenge the status quo, noting that Nishida's arrival triggers conflicts paralleling "Japan's universal post-war identity crisis", stating, "old traditions versus modern thinking; doubts about arranged marriage and feudalistic customs; a generational gulf between conservative adults and liberated youths; the emergence of assertive, independent-minded women; pastoral virtue versus urban decay." They also note that Noe and Riu, who dream of being liberated, end up paying with their lives.

== Production ==
The project was inspired by Honda's experiences filming Ise-Shima and was suggested by Honda's friend Sojiro Motoki, one of Japan's leading film producers at the time. Honda left with Akira Kurosawa to an inn at Atami for a writing retreat. Honda and Motoki chose to adapt Katsuro Yamada's prize winning novella Ruins of the Sea as the basis for the film.

Toho gave Honda three months to scout locations and conduct research on the Ise-Shima area due to the post-strike slowdown. Honda became a familiar face with the locals and was granted access not usually given to tourists.

The film is notable for being the first Japanese feature film to feature underwater photography. Cinematographer Tadashi Iimura placed a portable camera onto a metallic body that acted as a special waterproof device. With it under his arms, he dove into the water from a pontoon. Iimura also had two professional divers to assist with the camera. Honda and his assistant director would watch from the boat using glass scopes and Honda would direct Iimura by writing on Kent paper and having a diver send the message to Iimura.

== Release & Reception ==
The film was released on August 3, 1951 and received favorable reviews. Many praising its underwater scenes, technical aspects, and Honda's promising directing.

== Bibliography ==
- Galbraith IV, Stuart (2008). The Toho Studios Story: A History and Complete Filmography. Scarecrow Press. ISBN 9781461673743.
- Ryfle, Steve; Godziszewski, Ed (2017). Ishiro Honda: A Life in Film, from Godzilla to Kurosawa. Wesleyan University Press. ISBN 9780819570871.
