= Mirrorman =

1972 Japanese television series and film

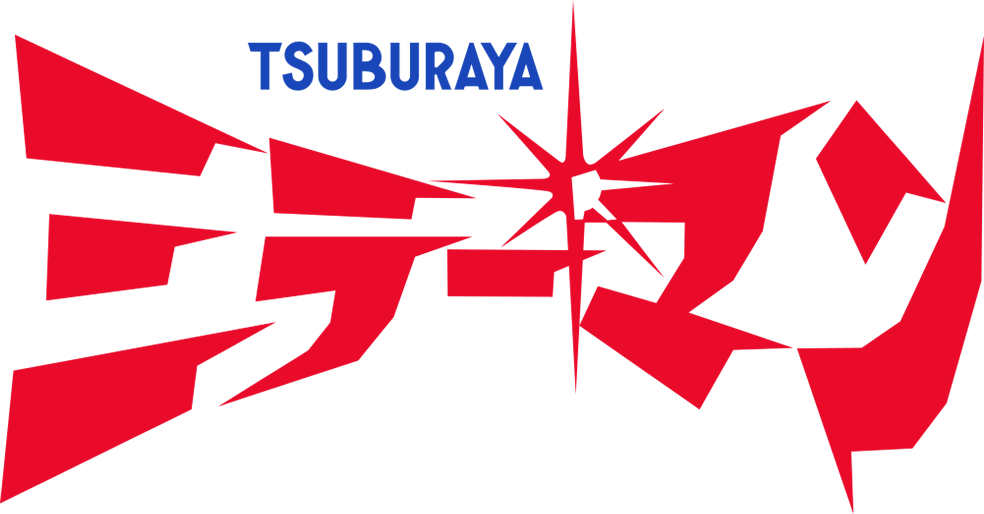
- Genre: Superhero; Science fiction Kaiju; Kyodai Hero
- Created by: Tsuburaya Productions
- Based on: Mirrorman by Fumio Hisamatsu
- Developed by: Bunzo Wakatsuki; Hiroyasu Yamaura
- Directed by: Ishiro Honda
- Starring: Nobuyuki Ishida, Junya Usami, Takako Asai
- Country of origin: Japan
- No. of episodes: 51

Production
- Running time: 24 minutes (per episode)

Original release
- Network: Fuji Television
- Release: December 5, 1971 – November 26, 1972

Mirrorman (ミラーマン, Mirāman) is a Japanese tokusatsu science fiction television series produced by Tsuburaya Productions, the series aired on Fuji TV from December 5, 1971 to November 26, 1972, with a total of 51 episodes. This was Tsuburaya Productions' first non-Ultra superhero (even though there were concepts that were similar to Ultraman, which became Tsuburaya trademarks). Like Ultraseven, Mirrorman was more of a dark and brooding science fiction drama than most other shows of its ilk, but by Episode 26, after major changes were forced upon the series by the network (making the action lighter and the hero more like Ultraman), it became a typical action-oriented superhero adventure of its era.

A short spinoff series titled Mirror Fight was broadcast on TV Tokyo from April 1, 1974 to September 27, 1974, with a total of 65 short episodes. It was similar in concept to the earlier Ultra Fight.

After years of sequel series rumors, the 2005 straight-to-DVD series Mirrorman REFLEX was released and later compiled into a film. Featuring no characters or connection to the old series, REFLEX has a darker tone on par with the first half of the original television series.

In July 2018, the series was released in the United States, after 47 years, on the television channel Toku. A month later, the series was added to its streaming platform.

On June 7, 2021, Tsuburaya announced a manga reboot, Mirrorman 2D, written and drawn by Nobunagun's Masato Hisa, to celebrate Mirrorman's 50th anniversary. The series was made available on Tsuburaya's subscription service Tsuburaya Imagination and the Japanese online manga site Comiplex. Tsuburaya also made English subbed episodes of the original series available weekly on Mondays on the official Ultraman YouTube channel.

== Plot ==
In the 1980s, an evil alien race known simply as the Invaders are about to take over the Earth, using assorted daikaiju (giant monsters) and other fiendish plots. Assigned to investigate this threat is an organization called the Science Guard Members (SGM). But another hope comes from someone, unbeknownst even to himself, possessing otherworldly power. Professor Mitarai, the leader of SGM, finally shares a secret with his foster son, a young photojournalist named Kyôtarô Kagami ("kagami" = Japanese for "mirror"), a secret only he himself knows: Kyôtarô is a half-caste of an alien father and a human mother (both of whom are missing — captives of the Invaders). Kyôtarô discovers that he is actually the son of Mirrorman, a superhero from the 2nd Dimension.

However, the original Mirrorman was defeated by the Invaders' toughest monster King Zyger (explained in Episode 14), but his son Kyôtarô survived, and shares the same powers as his namesake. Naturally, the young man had difficulty accepting his destiny, but he soon realizes that he is the only one who can save the Earth from the Invaders, when they try to assassinate him. In order to transform into Mirrorman, Kyôtarô must stand in front of any reflective surface (mirrors, water, etc.), and flash his Mirror-Pendant, and utter the words "Mirror Spark".

When the network demanded changes to the series by episode #26 to make it more Ultraman-like. Mirrorman is captured by Invaders after narrowing escaping a head on collison with a truck (driven by an invader agent) The hero undegoes an operation which the Invaders plant an energy bomb near his heart. If Mirrorman fights too long or uses any of his weapons, he will explode. When fighting the "Kaiju" (Monster) Snake King, Mirrorman receives his energy timer that is on his belt to warn him that his energy is getting unstable and he could explode unless he either kills the monster quickly or return into the Mirror deminsion. Also the group team SGM is outfitted with new weaponry and gadgets after surviving an assassination attempt.

Powers and Abilities Mirrorman has a vast array of Powers and weapons

Techniques

Special

Silver Cross (シルバークロス, Shirubā Kurosu): Mirrorman's finisher, he gathers energy then places his hands at the stars on his forehead and waist, bringing them together to shoot two large arrow shaped bursts of energy, can destroy a monster in one shot. It is a risky move for Mirrorman as it uses all of his energy. 

After being implanted with the bomb, Mirrorman also had to be careful of when he uses it to avoid igniting the bomb.

   Mirror Knife (ミラーナイフ, Mirā Naifu): Mirrorman can fire an arrow-shaped burst of energy to kill his opponents. In the earlier episodes this was the commonly used final technique, until the Silver Cross started to be used.

       Mirror Shot (ミラーシュート, Mirā Shūto): Mirrorman can fire small energy beams from his fingers all at once, it is a version of the Mirror Knife used while in mid-air. It can be fired from one or both hands.

   Mirror Slicer (ミラースライサー, Mirā Suraisā): V-shaped bursts of energy used to cut apart the enemy. There are two types.
       Slicer V (スライサーV, Suraisā V): A vertical slice.
           Mirror Rolling Slice (ミラーローリングスライス, Mirā Rōringu Suraisu): The Slicer V strengthened 5 times by rotating it.
       Slicer H (スライサーH, Suraisā H): A horizontal slice

Mirror Eye Beam (ミラー・アイビーム, Mirā Ai Bīmu): Destructive rays emitted from the eyes. Beam (ビーム, Bīmu): A beam of light fired from the cross on his forehead.

Mirror Fire (ミラーファイヤー, Mirā Faiyā): Used in episode 49, rays emitted from cross hands.

Finisher Horizontal Cut (必殺水平斬り, Hissatsu Suihei-kiri): A red cutter ray that shaped like a windmill. It was used against Mogura King, Zangani, and Iezu.

Physical

   Mirror Kick (ミラーキック, Mirā Kikku): Jumping into the air, Mirrorman can charge his legs with yellow energy to deliver a powerful kick.

       Miracle Kick (ミラクル・キック, Mirakuru Kikku): Similar to the Mirror Kick. Mirrorman concentrates red energy to both his feet and kicks the enemy in the head, decapitating them. Can hit multiple targets at once, which was how Gorgosaurus β and Pair-Mons King β were destroyed at the same time. First used against Arigeida.

       Cross Jump (クロスジャンプ, Kurosu Janpu): A kick to the opponent while both are high in the air.

   Straight Flush (ストレートフラッシュ, Sutorēto Furasshu): A series of high speed punches.

   Mirror Spin (ミラースピン, Mirā Supin): Mirrorman spins as he jumps into the air, kicking the opponent.

   Mirror Attack (ミラーアタック, Mirā Atakku): Mirrorman creates a clone that turns into light and rushes at the enemy, exploding on contact.

Other

   Defense Mirror (ディフェンスミラー, Difensu Mirā): Mirrorman can conjure a mirror-like barrier that reflect the enemy's energy attacks back at them. He used various types of the ability such as used a stick type to prevent Zailas' energy sword in episode 11, deflects the opponents' energy bullet one by one with hands, used a wall-shaped barrier in episode 33, and used a handheld type in episode 40. In episodes 1, 14, and 22, there are some tactics that can reflect the opponents' attack and turned them into counterattack.

   Mirror Grackle (ミラーグラックル, Mirā Gurakkuru): A vortex of energy that seals away the opponent.

   Mirror Halation (ミラーハレーション, Mirā Harēshon): When no mirror or reflective surface is present, Mirrorman can gather light to create an artificial one to transport himself. Because of the emission of bright light, it was also used to confuse Gold Satan in episode 7.

   Mirror Eyes (ミラーアイ, Mirā Ai): Blue rays emitted from the eyes to discover invisible objects or see across dimensions.

   Flight: Mirrorman unfortunately cannot fly, but with his ability to travel in an instant for one place to another by going into the mirror demension, he doesn't need it.

Source Ultraman Wiki

== Production Crew ==
- Supervisor: Hajime Tsuburaya
- Producers: Toyoaki Tan, Kazuho Mitsuda, Koji Bessho, Tsutomu Yatai
- Script: Bunzo Wakatsuki, Keisuke Fujikawa, Hiroyasu Yamaura, Shigemitsu Taguchi, Toyohiro Ando, Showa Ohta
- Music: Toru Fuyuki
- Directors of Photography: Takeshi Goto, Toshiyuki Machida, Senkichi Nagai
- Lighting: Kazuo Kobayashi
- Production Designer: Akira Kikuchi
- Assistant Directors: Hiroshi Shimura, Takeshi Kitamura
- Props: Moriaki Uematsu
- Progress: Une Honkou, Yu Iwatsubo, Terukichi Kokubo

=== Special Effects Unit ===
- Director of Photography: Katsutsugu Furuichi
- VFX Unit Cameraman Kunihiko Kimizuka
- Lighting: Yasuo Takakura
- Production Designer: Tetsuzo Osawa
- Assistant Director: Yoshiyuki Yoshimura
- Synthesis Technology: Minoru Nakano, Sadao Iizuka
- Practical Effects: Shoji Ogawa, Sadashige Tsukamoto, Fumio Nakadai, Kame Ogasawara, Eiji Shirakuma
- Mechanical Effects: Shigeo Kurakata
- Optical Photography: Kaneo Kimura, Michihisa Miyashige, Bunzo Hyodo, Kazuo Matsumoto
- Production Manager: Kazuo Ohashi
- Scripter Girls: Mihoko Kuroiwa, Keiko Suzuki, Haruyo Matsumaru, Kunie Nakanishi, Chieko Sawada, Masako Hisamatsu, Yoshie Yaguchi, Fumie Fuji, Settsu Kamiya
- Editing by: Yoshihiro Yanagawa
- Effect: Kiyasu Hara
- Production Managers: Masahiro Tsukahara, Masayuki Shitara
- In Charge of Production: Masahiro Tsukahara
- Recorded at: Central Recording
- Film Processing: Tokyo Lab

=== Live Action Unit ===
- Toshihiko Nakajima, Nobuo Ishiyama, Noriaki Yoshino, Shoichi Shinokawa, Tsuneko Ozeki, Takako Sekizawa, Kumiko Takagi

=== VFX Staff ===
- Kiyotaka Matsumoto, Masao Sekiguchi, Kenichi Amano, Kazuo Takano, Yukitsu Kanno, Shuichi Kishiura

=== Special Thanks to ===
- Sea Museum
- Hotel Shoto
- Yongda Boats
- Nagashima Onsen

== Film ==
Mirrorman
- Theatrical release poster
- Directed by: Ishirō Honda
- Screenplay by: Bunzō Wakatsuki
- Produced by: Toyoaki Awa
- Cinematography: Takeshi Goto
- Edited by: Yoshihiro Yanagawa
- Music by: Toru Fuyuki
- Production company: Tsuburaya Productions
- Distributed by: Toho
- Release date: March 12, 1972 (Japan)
- Running time: 25 minutes
- Country: Japan
- Language: Japanese

Mirrorman (ミラーマン, Mirāman) is a 1972 Japanese tokusatsu superhero kaiju short film directed by Ishirō Honda. The film consists of re-edited material from the first episode of the original television series Mirrorman.

A tornado sucked the city into the sky, and mysterious events occurred one after another in various parts of the world, and people's lives were filled with anxiety. Journalist Kyotaro saw an enigmatic man standing in green liquid and a spaceship. The Invaders were about to invade the earth. Dr. Mitarai, who has advised Kyotaro for a long time on the earth's crisis, revealed a surprising fact to him. Kyotaro discovers that he is actually the son of Mirrorman, a superhero from the 2nd Dimension. Kyotaro was shocked. The city of Tokyo was about to be destroyed by another dimension monster, the Iron, a few days later. As Kyotaro listened to it, the voice of his dying father was heard. A few hours later, Iron and Mirrorman engaged in a fierce battle, but Iron collapsed before Mirrorman's Mirror Knife.

=== Cast ===
- Nobuyuki Ishida as Kyoutarou Kagami
- Yōko Ichiji as Yuki Nomura
- Jun Usami as Dr. Mitarai
- Takako Sawai as Asami Mitari
- Hajime Sugiyama as Hidehiko Yasuda
- Shunya Wazaki as Hiroshi Murakami
- Kentaro Kudo as Takeshi Fujimoto
- Tadayoshi Kura as Ichiro Okawa

=== Release ===
Mirrorman was released in Japan on March 12, 1972, where it was distributed by Toho, as part of the Spring 1972 Toho Champion Festival. It was accompanied by Godzilla vs. Gigan, Pinocchio: The Series, Hutch the Honeybee: Hold Me, Momma, and The Genius Bakabon: Night Duty is Scary.

== Cameos and other appearances ==
- The characters of Chief Murakami, Yasuda and Nomura would later return in Jumborg Ace. A bank of Mirrorman can also be seen in one episode.
- The monster Gorgosaurus also appears in Ultraman Taro.
- The monster Dustpan would appear again in the Thai/Japanese co-production The 6 Ultra Brothers vs. the Monster Army.
- Mirror Knight, an homage to Mirrorman, appears in the film Ultraman Zero The Movie: Super Deciding Fight! The Belial Galactic Empire.
