= Come Marry Me =

- Film poster
- Directed by: Ishirō Honda
- Written by: Zenzô Matsuyama
- Produced by: Sanezumi Fujimoto
- Starring: Yūzō Kayama; Yôko Naitô; Keiko Sawai; Ichirô Arishima
- Cinematography: Shinsaku Uno
- Music by: Kenjirô Hirose
- Distributed by: Toho
- Release date: October 20, 1966 (Japan)
- Running time: 84 minutes
- Country: Japan
- Language: Japanese

Come Marry Me (Japanese: お嫁においで, Hepburn: Oyome ni oide) is a 1966 Japanese film directed by Ishirō Honda.

== Cast ==
- Yūzō Kayama as Tamotsu Suyama
- Yōko Naitō
- Keiko Sawai as Masako
- Ichirô Arishima as Hotel Boss
- Yukiko Kobayashi
- Toshio Kurosawa
- Yutaka Nakayama
- Kenzô Tabu
- Kazuo Suzuki
- Senkichi Ômura
- Chishû Ryû
