= Lovetide =

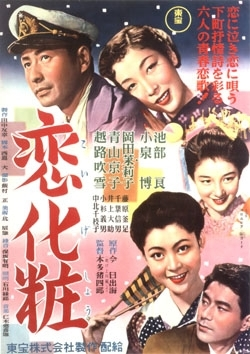
- Film poster
- Directed by: Ishirō Honda
- Screenplay by: Dai Nishijima
- Based on: Fukeyo kawakaze by Hidemi Kon
- Produced by: Tomoyuki Tanaka
- Starring: Ryō Ikebe; Hiroshi Koizumi; Fubuki Koshiji
- Cinematography: Tadashi Iimura
- Music by: Yoshio Nikita
- Production company: Toho
- Distributed by: Toho
- Release date: 9 January 1955 (Japan)
- Running time: 81 minutes
- Country: Japan

Lovetide (Japanese: 恋化粧, Hepburn: Koi-gesho; transl. Love Makeup) is a 1955 Japanese film directed by Ishirō Honda based on the story Fukeyo kawakaze by Hidemi Kon. The film is set in a post-War Tokyo where two of its citizens are lovers who reunite after being separated by the war.

== Production ==
Lovetide was director Ishirō Honda's follow-up to his film Godzilla and was his first film specifically made for female audiences. The film was made with the studio promoting it as "a gorgeous love melodrama with Toho's best cast, meant for all the women-fans."

The film is based on the story Fukeyo kawakaze by Hidemi Kon. The film's story and cast (specifically Mariko Okada and Chieko Nakakita, the wife of producer Tomoyuki Tanaka) have been described Honda authors Steve Rylfe and Ed Godziszewski as being similar to the film Floating Clouds that was directed by Mikio Naruse and released a few weeks after Lovetide. Tanaka had mentioned that if he had not steered Honda towards predominantly making science fiction films, Honda would have become "a director like Mikio Naruse."

== Release ==
Lovetide was distributed theatrically by Toho on 9 January 1955.

== See also ==
- List of Japanese films of 1955
