= Wakai ki =

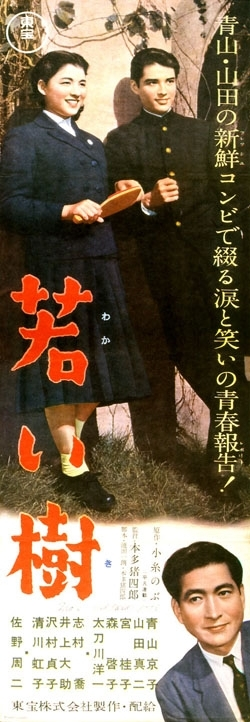
- Japanese Movie poster
- Directed by: Ishirō Honda
- Screenplay by: Ichirō Ikeda; Ishirō Honda
- Story by: Nobu Koito
- Produced by: Jin Usami
- Starring: Kyoko Aoyama; Shinji Yamada; Shuji Sano; Yoichi Tachikawa
- Cinematography: Kazuo Yamazaki
- Music by: Nobuo Iida
- Production company: Toho
- Distributed by: Toho
- Release date: January 22, 1956 (Japan)
- Running time: 90 minutes
- Country: Japan

Wakai ki (若い樹) (lit. 'A Young Tree') is a 1956 Japanese film directed by Ishirō Honda. Wakai ki is about a young girl who moves to Tokyo and endures the rivalries between other high school girls of varying cultural and economic backgrounds.

== Release ==
Wakai ki was released in Japan on January 22, 1956. Any release in the United States is undetermined.
