= A Farewell to the Woman Called My Sister =

1957 film by Ishirō Honda

- Original Japanese movie poster
- Directed by: Ishirō Honda
- Written by: Ishirō Honda; Hirosuke Takenaka
- Produced by: Ryo Takei
- Starring: Chikage Oogi; Hiroshi Koizumi; Chiyoko Shimakura; Akihiko Hirata; Machiko Kitagawa
- Cinematography: Minoru Kuribayashi
- Music by: Nobuyuki Takeoka
- Production company: Toho
- Distributed by: Toho
- Release date: August 25, 1957 (Japan)
- Country: Japan
- Language: Japanese

A Farewell to the Woman Called My Sister (Japanese: 別れの茶摘歌 姉妹篇 お姉さんと呼んだ人, Hepburn: Wakare no chatsumi-uta shimai-hen: Oneesan to yonda hito) is a 1957 black and white Japanese film directed by Ishirō Honda.

The film's production designer was Iwao Akune, while its lighting technician was Yoshio Tanaka and the sound technician was Sanya Yamamoto.

== Cast ==
- Chikage Oogi
- Hiroshi Koizumi
- Chiyoko Shimakura
- Akihiko Hirata
- Machiko Kitagawa
- Fuyuki Murakami
- Minosuke Yamada
- Rikie Sanjo
- Soji Ubukata
- Toshiko Nakano
- Tadao Nakamura
