= Chiyoko Shimakura =

Japanese singer and TV presenter

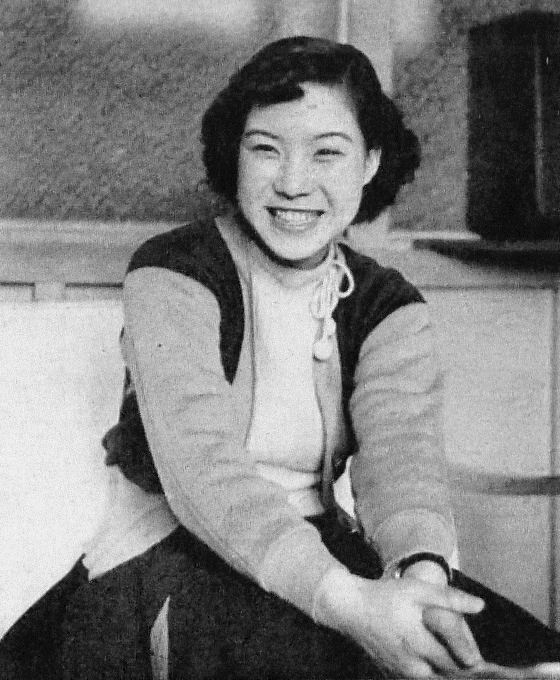

Background information
- Born: 30 March 1938
- Origin: Tokyo, Japan
- Died: 8 November 2013 (aged 75)
- Genre: Enka
- Occupations: Singer, lyricist
- Years active: 1954–2013 (her death)
- Label: Columbia Music Entertainment

Chiyoko Shimakura (島倉 千代子, Shimakura Chiyoko) (30 March 1938 – 8 November 2013) was an Enka singer and TV presenter in Japan. She was considered "the Goddess of Enka".

== Career ==
Chiyoko was born in Shinagawa Ward, Tokyo, Japan. In 1954, Chiyoko won the 1st prize of the Columbia Music Entertainment singers competition. In 1955, she made her recording début with the single "Konoyo no Hana". She was an Enka singer who appeared in NHK Kōhaku Uta Gassen, starring 35 times, including 30 consecutive years straight. However, she forgot her song lyrics in 1996. She participated again in the Kōhaku in 2004.

== Death ==
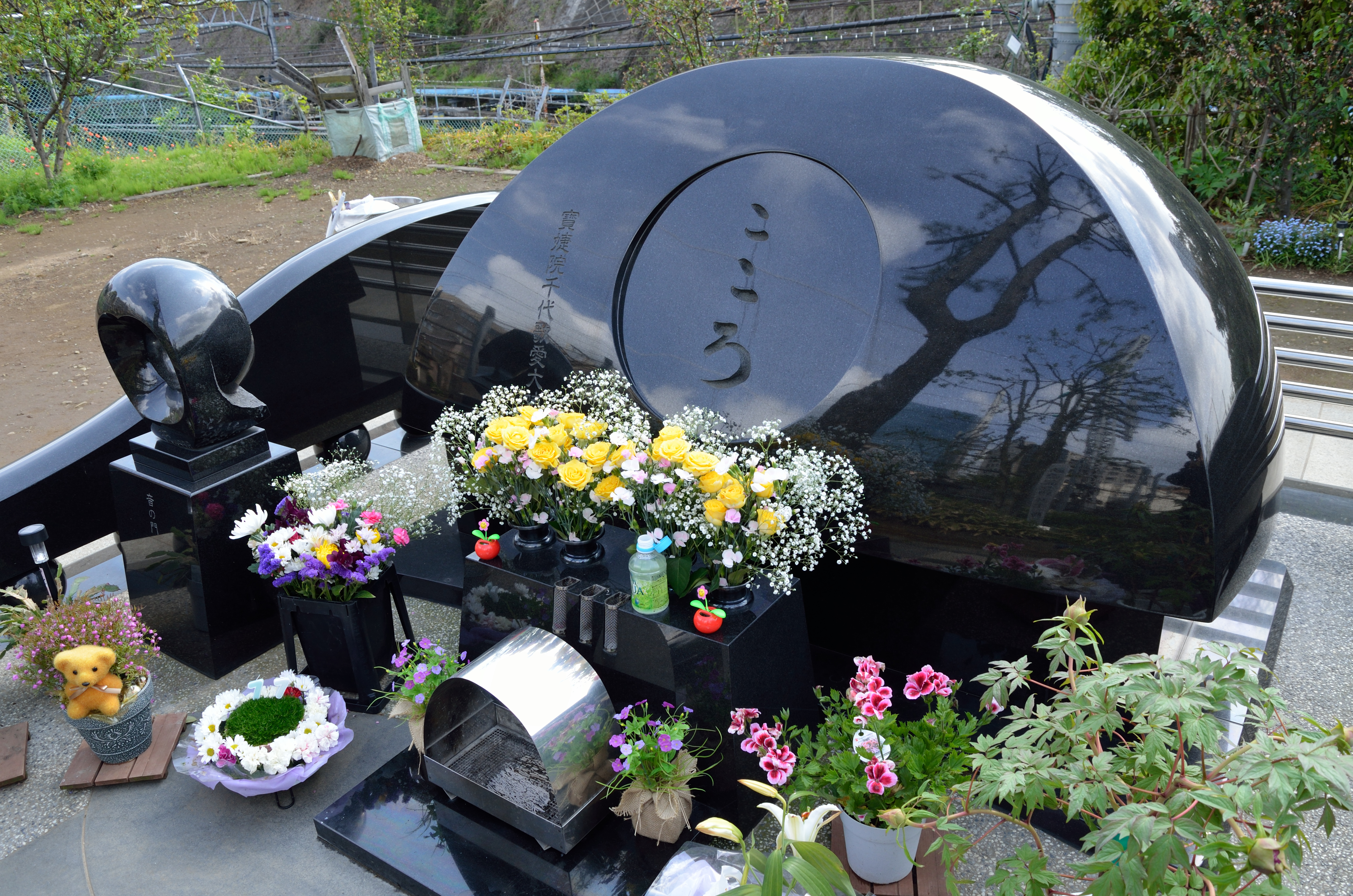
Shimakura's grave at her hometown Shinagawa

After a long battle with liver cancer, she died, at age 75, on 8 November 2013.

== Discography ==
- Konoyo no Hana (この世の花) (1955) (The Fruit and Bloom in the world) - Chiyoko herself is featured in the movie of the same name.
- Tōkyō Dayo Okkasan (東京だョお母さん) (1957) (Mummy, here we are in Tōkyō), which sold more than 1 million copies.
- Jinsei Iroiro (人生いろいろ) (1987)
  - Best selling single of hers, selling over 1.3 million copies, won Japan Record Award for Best Singer and peaking at No.16 on weekly Oricon chart for 86 weeks.

== Chart ==
Weekly

Year	Chart	Song	Peak position	Appearances (Weeks)
1987	Japanese Singles Chart	Jinsei Iroiro (人生いろいろ)	16	86

== Award ==
Year	Award	Category	Song	Result
1987	Japan Record Awards (日本レコード大賞)	Best Singer	Jinsei Iroiro (人生いろいろ)	Won

== State honors, awards and decorations ==
- Japan: Medal of Honor with Purple Ribbon (1999)

== Filmography ==
- A Farewell to the Woman Called My Sister (別れの茶摘歌 姉妹篇 お姉さんと呼んだ人 Wakare no chatsumi-uta shimai-hen: Oneesan to yonda hito) (1957)
