= Hiroshi Koizumi =

Japanese actor and TV presenter (1926–2015)

- 小泉博
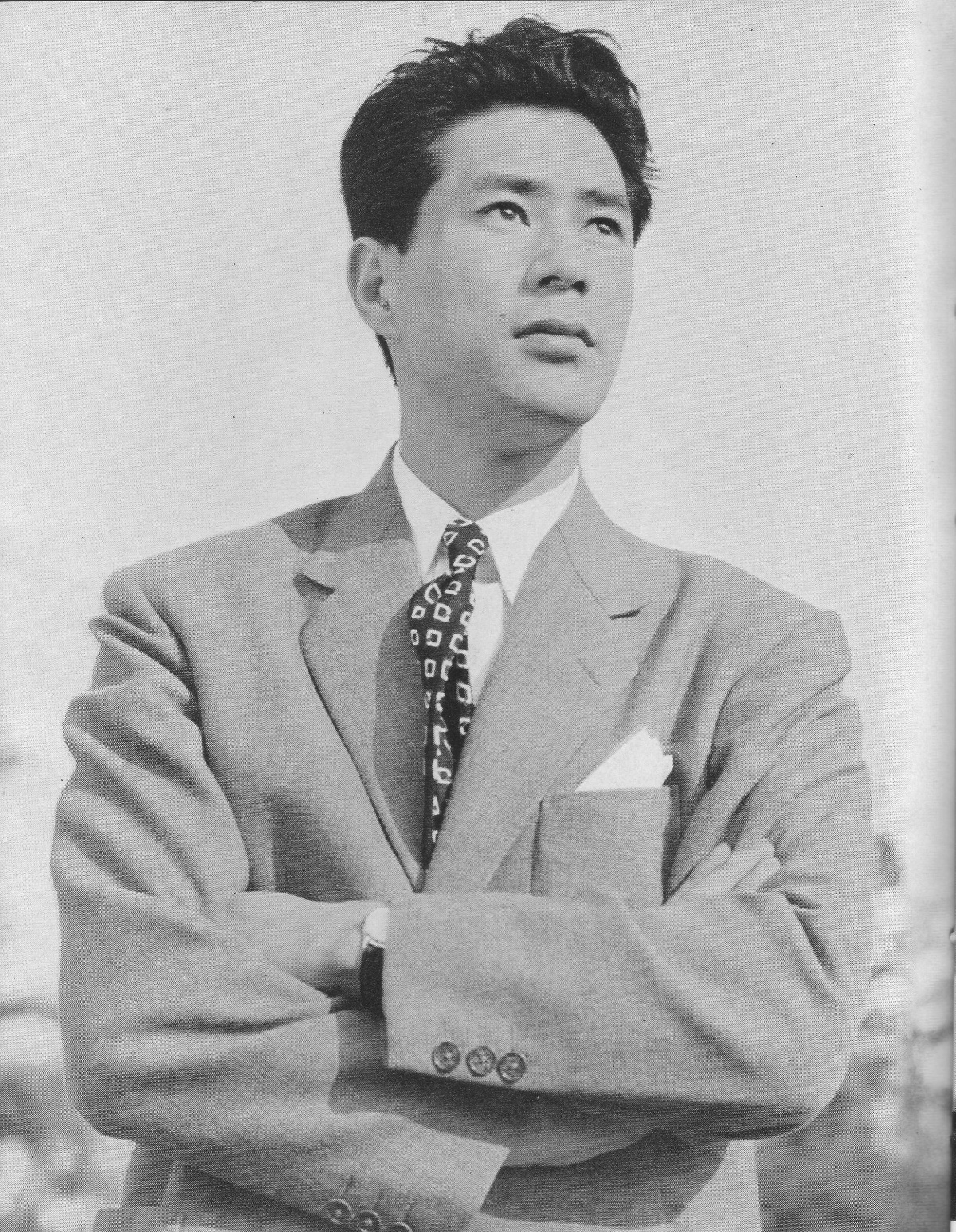
- Hiroshi Koizumi. taken in 1955.
- Born: 小泉 汪 August 12, 1926; Kamakura, Kanagawa, Japan
- Died: May 31, 2015 (aged 88); Tokyo, Japan
- Occupation: Actor
- Notable credit(s): Shoichi Tsukioka in Godzilla Raids Again, Dr. Shinichi Chujo in Mothra and Godzilla: Tokyo S.O.S.

Hiroshi Koizumi (小泉博, Koizumi Hiroshi; birth name written as 小泉 汪) (12 August 1926 – 31 May 2015) was a Japanese actor, best known for his starring role in the 1955 film Godzilla Raids Again as well as other Toho Studios monster movies. He was born in Japan. He is a graduate of Keio University in Tokyo.

In a 1999 interview with Steve Ryfle, Koizumi laments that while he stated he has easy parts to play, he felt he could have done more in his performances. Despite his roles where he usually plays a scientist, he plays a powerful role in Late Chrysanthemums, playing a young man that married an older wealthy woman to escape from the slums. On 31 May 2015, Koizumi died at a hospital in Tokyo from pneumonia at the age of 88.

== Filmography ==
=== Film ===
- Seishun kaigi (1952) - Shôgo Murase
- Rakki-san (1952)
- Kin no tamago: Golden girl (1952)
- Wakai hito (1952)
- Tôkyô no koibito (1952) - Shôtarô
- Kekkon annai (1952)
- Minato e kita otoko (1952) - Shingo Nishizawa
- Itou shain-santô jyûyaku kyodaihen (1953)
- Fukeyo haru kaze (1953) - The young man
- Hoyo (1953) - Yoshikawa, alias Sampei
- Pu-san (1953)
- Aijô ni tsuite (1953) - Akira Murase
- Jirochô sangokushi: Jirochô to Ishimatsu (1953)
- Jirochô sangokushi: seizoroi Shimizu Minato (1953)
- Tokai no yokogao (1953)
- Shirauo (1953) - Sumida
- Kofuku-san (1953)
- Hana no naka no musumetachi (1953) - Jun'ichi Mimura
- Jirochô sangokushi: hatsu iwai Shimizu Minato (1954)
- Mama no nikki (1954)
- Jirochô sangokushi: kaitô-ichi no abarenbô (1954)
- Late Chrysanthemums (1954) - Kiyoshi
- Haha no hatsukoi (1954)
- Josei ni kansuru jûni shô (1954) - Koheita Kure
- Koi-gesho (1955) - Ishjina
- Ashita no kôfuku (1955) - Toshio Matsuzaki
- Mekura neko (1955)
- Tsuki ni tobu kari (1955) - Amemiya
- Godzilla Raids Again (1955) - Shoichi Tsukioka
- Oen-san (1955) - Hiroshi Matsuyama
- Ryanko no Yatarô (1955) - Ryanko no Yatarô
- Kuchizuke (1955) - Eikichi Uemura- The Girl in Mist (segment 2)
- Sugata naki mokugekisha (1955) - Detective Funaki
- Aoi hate (1955) - Jiro Tamura
- Ankokugai (1955) - Yumiko's fiancé
- Migotona musume (1956) - Shirô Yukimra
- Nyôbô zoku wa uttaeru (1956) - Junji Komiya
- Kon'yaku sanbagarasu (1956) - Taniyama
- Ôabare Cha-Cha musume (1956)
- Shujinsen (1956)
- Hesokuri shacho to wanman shacho: Hesokuri shacho kanto su (1956)
- Sazae-san (1956) - Masuo Fuguta
- Bôkyaku no hanabira (1957)
- Yama to kawa no aru machi (1957)
- Kono futari ni sachi are (1957)
- Zoku Sazae-san (1957) - Fuguta
- Sanjûrokunin no jôkyaku (1957) - Ichirô Watanabe - Detective
- Nikui mono (1957) - Mr Kurata
- Bôkyaku no hanabira: Kanketsuhen (1957)
- A Farewell to the Woman Called My Sister (1957)
- Wakare no chatsumi-uta shimai-hen: Oneesan to yonda hito (1957)
- Hanayome ha mateirû (1957)
- Sazae-san no seishun (1957) - Fuguta
- Aijô no miyako (1958) - Yamane, Murata's friend
- Jazu musume ni eiko are (1958) - Masao
- Song for a Bride (1958)
- A Holiday in Tokyo (1958) - Jiro
- Doji o numana (1958)
- Romansu matsuri (1958)
- Jirochô gaiden: Haikagura kiso no himatsuri (1958)
- Gigantis, the Fire Monster (1959) - Shoichi Tsukioka
- Yajû shisubeshi (1959) - Detective Masugi
- Ginza no onêchan (1959)
- Yari hitosuji nihon bare (1959) - Shinsuke
- Sazae-san no dâssen okusamâ (1959)
- Sazae-san no akachan tanjo (1960)
- Ginza taikutsu musume (1960) - Takashi Koshiba
- Hawai Middowei daikaikûsen: Taiheiyô no arashi (1960)
- Daughters, Wives and a Mother (1960) - Hidetaka Tani
- Gambare! Bangaku (1960)
- Chikûho no kodomotachi (1960)
- Sazae-san to epuron obasan (1960)
- Ginza no koibitotachi (1961)
- Fuku no kami: Sazae-san ikka (1961)
- Honkon no yoru (1960)
- Mothra (1961) - Dr. Shinichi Chujo
- Futari no musuko (1961)
- Honkon No Hoshi (1962) - Haruyama
- Sôtome ke no musume tachi (1962) - Tatsurô Yoshimura
- 47 Samurai (1962) - Gengo Ôtaka
- Kôkôsei to onna kyôshi: hijô no seishun (1962)
- Attack Squadron! (1963)
- Tsuma toiuna no onnatachi (1963)
- Matango (1963) - Naoyuki Sakuda
- Atragon (1963) - Detective Ito, Tokyo Metropolitan Police
- Kon'nichiwa akachan (1964) - Toshio Mikami
- Mothra vs. Godzilla (1964) - Professor Miura
- Dogara, the Space Monster (1964) - Kirino
- Ghidorah, the Three-Headed Monster (1964) - Professor Miura
- Kokkura suzumaru (1965)
- Honkon no shiroibara (1965)
- Bangkok no yoru (1966) - Kitajima
- Jinchoge (1966) - Maekawa
- Japan's Longest Day (1967) - Nobukata Wada - NHK Broadcaster
- Go! Go! Wakadaishô (1969) - Okamoto
- Furesshuman wakadaishô (1969)
- Battle of the Japan Sea (1969) - Kurino
- Sotsugyô ryokô (1973) - Kazuhiko Saito
- Godzilla vs. Mechagodzilla (1974) - Professor Wagura
- Prophecies of Nostradamus (1974) - Environmental Scientist 2
- Zoku ningen kakumei (1976)
- Boryoku senshi (1979)
- The Return of Godzilla (1984) - Professor Minami
- Godzilla 1985 (1985) - Professor Minami
- Godzilla: Tokyo S.O.S. (2003) - Dr. Shinichi Chujo
- Zero Focus (2009)

=== Television ===
- Ultra Q (1966) - Chief Airport Traffic Controller Kaneko
- Onihei Hankachō (1975)
- Chouseishin Gransazer (2003) - Shinichi Nakajo
