= Eiji Tsuburaya filmography =

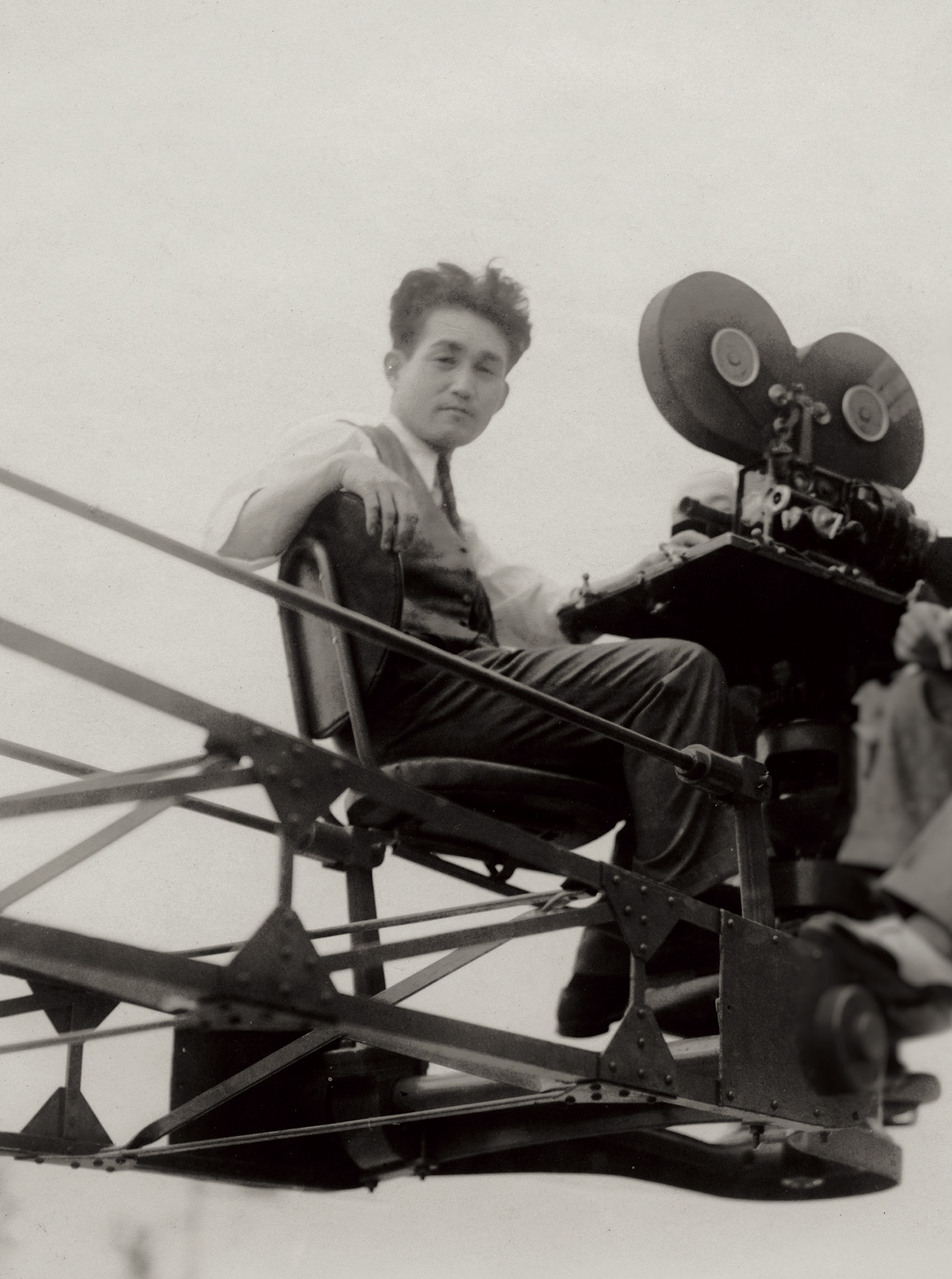
Tsuburaya on his shooting crane in 1934

Eiji Tsuburaya (1901–1970) was a Japanese special effects director and filmmaker who worked on roughly 250 films throughout his five-decade career. Having pioneered and popularized the special effects sector of the Japanese film industry, he is popularly known as the "Father of Tokusatsu". (Note: 特撮の父, Tokusatsu no Chichi; lit. 'Father of special effects'.) Tsuburaya started his career in the Japanese film industry as a cinematographer for several successful dramas and jidaigeki (Japanese historical drama) films in the early 1920s. His directorial debut was the propaganda documentary film Three Thousand Miles Across the Equator, which he filmed in the Pacific Ocean on the Asama for most of 1935. Following the completion of photography on this film, he worked as the cinematographer and had his debut as special effects director on Princess Kaguya (1935). It was one of Japan's first major productions to feature special effects. The next year, Tsuburaya made his dramatic directorial debut with the release of Folk Song Collection: Oichi of Torioi Village and had substantial success staging the special effects for Arnold Fanck's The Daughter of the Samurai (released in 1937).

Tsuburaya left his job in Kyoto and moved to Tokyo in order to form the newly established company Toho's special effects division in late 1937. The following year, he was assigned to create effects for The Abe Clan and directed and filmed the unreleased propaganda musical The Song of Major Nanjo; two years later, he directed and shot the documentary motion picture entitled The Imperial Way of Japan and shot the war film Navy Bomber Squadron. In 1942, Tsuburaya supervised the effects for the Kajirō Yamamoto-directed war epic The War at Sea from Hawaii to Malaya, which became the highest-grossing Japanese film in history. His efforts were regarded as a significant factor in its major critical and commercial success and earned him the Technical Research Award from the Japan Motion Picture Cinematographers Association. Tsuburaya was purged from employment at Toho by the Supreme Commander for the Allied Powers in 1948. He created his own independent effects company and worked on films by other major film companies, including Daiei Film's The Invisible Man Appears (1949), which was Japan's first science fiction film. Tsuburaya returned to Toho in 1950, and subsequently worked on their films Escape at Dawn (1950), The Lady of Musashino (1951), The Skin of the South, and The Man Who Came to Port (both 1952), Eagle of the Pacific (1953), and Farewell Rabaul (1954), with the latter four being his first collaborations with director Ishirō Honda.

In 1954, Tsuburaya directed the special effects for Hiroshi Inagaki's jidaigeki epic Samurai I: Musashi Miyamoto and Honda's kaiju film Godzilla. For the latter major critically and commercially successful film, he achieved his first Japan Technical Award for Special Skill and attained international recognition. Two years later, he directed the effects for Shirō Toyoda's The Legend of the White Serpent and Honda's Rodan, with Rodan winning him his second Japan Technical Award. In response to recent popular alien invasion science fiction films, Toho assigned Tsuburaya to direct the effects for Honda's big-budget epic The Mysterians (1956) and he won another Japan Technical Award for his work. Three years later, Tsuburaya earned another Japan Technical Award for his effects on Inagaki's $1 million epic The Three Treasures. Later, he worked on the tremendously successful tokusatsu films: Mothra, The Last War (both 1961), King Kong vs. Godzilla, and Chūshingura: Hana no Maki, Yuki no Maki (both 1962). In 1963, he earned the Japan Technical Award for his special effects work on The Lost World of Sinbad; the following year he made the effects for Honda's Mothra vs. Godzilla, often regarded as his best kaiju film. Also that year, he began preproduction on his recently founded company's first series that aired on Japanese television in 1966, under the title Ultra Q, and created the special effects for Frank Sinatra's war epic None but the Brave. His efforts on the 1965 war film Retreat from Kiska won him another Japan Technical Award for Special Skill and he gained the same award the following year for the same position in Honda's Invasion of Astro-Monster (also 1965).

Because Ultra Q was a tremendous success during its release, Tsuburaya moved on to develop and supervise a follow-up titled Ultraman. Ultraman was broadcast from 1966 to 1967 and was even more successful than its predecessor. These programs spanned a franchise that is still majorly popular and ongoing today. After working on Honda's influential kaiju film The War of the Gargantuas (1966), he began being credited as the "special effects supervisor" on the Godzilla films and continued receiving this credit until Destroy All Monsters (1968). His final official theatrical film credit, the Seiji Maruyama-directed war epic Battle of the Japan Sea, was released in August 1969 and became the second-highest-grossing Japanese film of 1969; he received a ceremonial title as effects director on Honda's All Monsters Attack later that year. In December of the same year, he completed work on Birth of the Japanese Islands, an audiovisual exhibit for the Expo '70. Tsuburaya planned to work on Space Amoeba, Japan Airplane Guy, and Princess Kaguya, but died in Itō, Shizuoka on January 25, 1970, a day before his scheduled return to Tokyo to begin work on the projects.

== Film ==
Film work by Eiji Tsuburaya
Year	Title	Credited as				Notes	Ref(s)
Year	Title	Special effects director	Cinematographer	Director	Special effects supervisor	Notes	Ref(s)
1919	A Tune of Pity (Note: 哀の曲, Awaremi no Kyoku)	No	Assistant	No	No		
1920	Tombs of the Island (Note: 島の塚, Shima no Tsuka)	No	Assistant	No	No		
1925	The Hunchback of Enmei'in Temple (Note: 延命院の傴僂男, Enmei'in no Semushi Otoko)	No	Yes	No	No		
1926	A Page of Madness (Note: 狂った一頁, Kurutta Ichipēji)	No	Assistant	No	No		
1927	Children's Swordplay (Note: 稚児の剱法, Chingo no Kenpō)	No	Yes	No	No		
1927	The Bat Copybook (Note: 蝙蝠草紙, Komori Zoshi)	No	Yes	No	No		
1927	Mad Blade Under the Moon (Note: 月下の狂刃, Gekka no Kyōba)	No	Yes	No	No		
1927	Record of the Tragic Swords of the Tenpo Era (Note: 天保悲剣録, Tenpo Hiken-roku)	No	Yes	No	No		
1928	Sayamaro the Thief (Note: 怪盗沙弥麿, Kaitou Sayamaro)	No	Yes	No	No		
1929	Light and Shadow (Note: 明暗, Meian)	No	Yes	No	No		
1929	A Tale of the Occult (Note: 妖魔綺譚, Youma Kitan)	No	Yes	No	No		
1930	Sanji, the Wild Fox (Note: 野狐三次, Nogitsune Sanji)	No	Yes	No	No		
1931	A Wolf Howls in the Blizzard (Note: 吹雪に叫ぶ狼, Fubuki-ni Sakebu Okami)	No	Yes	No	No		
1932	Fierce Attack at Takadanobaba (Note: 猛襲高田の馬場, Mōshū Takada nobaba)	No	Yes	No	No		
1932	Ghost Story: The Book of Evening Calm (Note: 怪談 ゆうなぎ草紙, Kaidan Yuunagi Zoshi)	No	Yes	No	No		
1933	Drizzle in Gion (Note: 祇園しぐれ, Gion Shigure)	No	Yes	No	No		
1934	Astaro Descends Mt. Akagi (Note: 浅太郎赤城颪, Asataro Akagi Oroshi)	No	Yes	No	No		
1934	Fusaemon Araki: Lord of Iga (Note: 荒木又右衛門 天下の伊賀越, Araki Fusaemon Tenka no Iga Goe)	No	Yes	No	No		
1935	The Chorus of a Million (Note: 百万人の合唱, Hakku-Man'nin no Gassho)	No	Yes	No	No		
1935	Princess Kaguya (Note: かぐや姫, Kaguya-hime)	Yes	Yes	No	No		
1936	Three Thousand Miles Across the Equator (Note: 赤道越えて, Sekidō Koete lit. 'Across the Equator')	No	Yes	Yes	No	Documentary	
1936	Folk Song Collection: Oichi of Torioi Village (Note: 小唄磯鳥追お市, Koutareki Torioi Oichi)	No	No	Yes	No		
1937	The Daughter of the Samurai (Note: 新しき土, Atarashiki Tsuchi lit. 'The New Earth'. German: Die Tochter des Samurai)	Yes	No	No	No		
1938	The Abe Clan (Note: 阿部一族, Abe Ichizoku)	Yes	No	No	No		
1938	The Song of Major Nangō (Note: 嗚呼南郷少佐, Aa Nangō Shōsa lit. 'Ah, Major Nangō')	No	Yes	Yes	No	Unreleased	
1940	The Imperial Way of Japan (Note: 皇道日本, Kodo Nippon)	No	Yes	Yes	No		
1940	Navy Bomber Squadron (Note: 海軍爆撃隊, Kaigun Bakugeki-tai)	Yes	No	No	No		
1940	The Burning Sky (Note: 燃ゆる大空, Moyuru ōzora)	Yes	No	No	No		
1940	Son Gokū (Note: 孫悟空 lit. 'Son Wukong')	No	Special effects	No	No	Two-part film; with Bunshiro Okuno	
1941	Moon Over Shanghai (Note: 上海の月, Shanghai no tsuki)	Yes	No	No	No		
1942	Bouquet for the South Pacific (Note: 南海の花束, Nankai no Hanabata)	Yes	No	No	No		
1942	Koharu's Play (Note: 小春狂言, Koharu kyōgen)	Yes	No	No	No		
1942	War Song of the Wings (Note: 翼の凱歌, Tsubasa no Gaika)	Yes	No	No	No		
1942	The War at Sea from Hawaii to Malaya (Note: ハワイ・マレー沖海戦, Hawai Marē Oki Kaisen)	Yes	No	No	No		
1942	Ramayana (Note: ラーマーヤナ, Rāmāyana)	No	No	No	No	Scripting supervisor	
1943	The Opium War (Note: 阿片戦争, Ahen sensō)	Yes	No	No	No		
1943	World of Love: The Story of Windcat Tomi (Note: 愛の世界 山猫とみの話, Ai no Sekai Yamaneko Tomi no Hanashi)	Yes	No	No	No		
1943	Marching Music Force (Note: 音楽大進軍, Ongaku Daishingun)	Yes	No	No	No		
1943	The Story of Heiroku's Dream (Note: 兵六夢物語, Heiroku Yume Monogatari)	Yes	No	No	No		
1943	Watchtower Suicide Squad (Note: 望楼の決死隊, Bōrō no Kesshi-tai)	Yes	No	No	No		
1943	Military Song of the Morning Mist (Note: あさぎり軍歌, Asagiri gunka)	Yes	No	No	No		
1943	Man (Note: 男, Otoko)	Yes	No	No	No		
1943	Toward the Decisive Battle in the Sky (Note: 決戦の大空へ, Kessen no ōzora he)	Yes	No	No	No		
1943	Diary of a Drifting Boy (Note: 少年漂流記, Shōnen hyōryū-ki)	Yes	No	No	No		
1943	Hot Wind (Note: 熱風, Nepū)	Yes	No	No	No		
1943	Forward with the Flag of Independence (Note: 進め独立旗, Susume dokuritsu hata)	Yes	No	No	No		
1943	Naniwabushi Recitation Chushingura (Note: 浪曲忠臣蔵, Rōkyoku Chūshingura)	Yes	No	No	No		
1944	Fire on that Flag! (Note: あの旗を撃て, Ano hata o ute)	Yes	No	No	No		
1944	Kato's Falcon Fighters Squadron (Note: 加藤隼戦闘隊, Katō Hayabusa sentōtai)	Yes	No	No	No		
1944	Four Weddings (Note: 四つの結婚, Yottsu no kekkon)	Yes	No	No	No		
1944	Bomber Squadron, Move Out (Note: 雷撃隊出動, Raigeki-tai Shutsudō)	Yes	No	No	No		
1945	Until the Day of Victory (Note: 勝利の日まで, Shōri no Himade)	Yes	No	No	No		
1945	Three People of the North (Note: 北の三人, Kita no San'nin)	Yes	No	No	No		
1945	Five Men from Tokyo (Note: 東京五人男, Tōkyō go-ri Otoko)	Yes	No	No	No		
1946	The Descendants of Taro Urashima (Note: 浦島太郎の後裔, Urashima Tarō no kōei)	Yes	No	No	No		
1946	An Enemy of the People (Note: 民衆の敵, Minshū no teki)	Yes	No	No	No		
1946	Lord for a Night (Note: 或る夜の殿様, Aru yoru no Tonosama)	Yes	No	No	No		
1947	A Thousand and One Nights with Toho (Note: 東宝千一夜, Toho senichi-ya)	Yes	No	No	No		
1948	A Moonflower in Heaven (Note: 天の夕顔, Ten no yūgao)	Yes	No	No	No		
1948	Gate of Flesh (Note: 肉体の門, Nikutai no mon)	Yes	No	No	No		
1948	A Woman in a Typhoon Area (Note: 颱風圏の女, Taifuunken no Onna)	Yes	No	No	No		
1948	The Bandit of Moonlight Castle (Note: 月光城の盗賊, Gekkō-jō no Tōzoku)	Yes	No	No	No		
1949
1949	The White-Haired Fiend (Note: 白髪鬼, Shiraga oni)	Yes	No	No	No		
1949	Flowers of Raccoon Palace (Note: 花くらべ狸御殿, Hana Kurabe Tanuki Goten)	Yes	No	No	No		
1949	The Rainbow Man (Note: 虹男, Niji Otoko)	Yes	No	No	No	Uncredited; with Tatsuyuki Yokota	
1949	The Ghost Train (Note: 幽霊列車, Yūrei Ressha)	Yes	No	No	No		
1949	My Name is Mistress (Note: わたしの名は情婦, Watashi no Na wa Jōfu)	Yes	No	No	No		
1949	The Invisible Man Appears (Note: 透明人間現わる, Tōmei Ningen Arawaru)	Yes	No	No	No		
1950	Escape at Dawn (Note: 暁の脱走, Akatsuki no Dassō)	Yes	No	No	No		
1950	Listen to the Voices of the Sea (Note: 日本戦歿学生の手記 きけ、わだつみの声, Nippon senbotsu gakusei no shuki: Kike wadatsumi no koe lit. 'Notes from Fallen Japanese Student Soldiers: Listen to the Voices from the Sea')	Yes	No	No	No		
1950	Kojirō Sasaki: Part One (Note: 佐々木小次郎(第一部), Sasaki Kojirō (Dai'ichibu))	Yes	No	No	No		
1951	Beyond Love and Hate (Note: 愛と憎しみの彼方へ, Ai to Nikushimi no Kanata-e)	Yes	No	No	No		
1951	Pirate Ship (Note: 海賊船, Kaizoku-sen)	Yes	No	No	No		
1951	The Lady of Musashino (Note: 武蔵野夫人, Musashino fujin)	Yes	No	No	No		
1952	The Skin of the South (Note: 南国の肌, Nangoku no hada)	Yes	No	No	No		
1952	Hakone Fuunroku (Note: 箱根風雲録, Hakone Fūunroku)	No	Special effects	No	No		
1952	The Man Who Came to Port (Note: 港へ来た男, Minato e Kita Otoko)	Yes	No	No	No		
1953	The Tower of Lilies (Note: ひめゆりの塔, Himeyuri no Tō)	Yes	No	No	No		
1953	The Sunday That Jumped Out (Note: 飛び出した日曜日, Tobidashita Nichiyōbi)	No	Yes	No	No	With Jun Yasumoto	
1953	Beyond the Clouds (Note: 雲ながるる果てに, Kumo nagaruru hate-ni)	Yes	No	No	No		
1953	Anatahan (Note: アナタハン)	Yes	No	No	No		
1953	What Is Your Name? (Note: 君の名は, Kimi no na wa)	Yes	No	No	No		
1953	Eagle of the Pacific (Note: 太平洋の鷲, Taiheiyo no washi)	Yes	No	No	No		
1953	What Is Your Name? Part II (Note: 君の名は 第二部, Kimi no na wa Dainibu)	Yes	No	No	No		
1954	Farewell Rabaul (Note: さらばラバウル, Saraba Rabauru)	Yes	No	No	No		
1954	What Is Your Name? Part III (Note: 君の名は 第三部, Kimi no na wa Daisanbu)	Yes	No	No	No		
1954	And Thus the Liberty Bell Rang (Note: かくて自由の鐘は鳴る, Kakute jiyū no kane wa naru)	Yes	No	No	No		
1954	Samurai I: Musashi Miyamoto (Note: 宮本武蔵, Miyamoto Musashi)	Yes	No	No	No		
1954	Godzilla (Note: ゴジラ, Gojira)	Yes	No	No	No		
1954	The Invisible Avenger (Note: 透明人間, Tomei Ningen lit. 'The Invisible Man')	Yes	Yes	No	No		
1955	Godzilla Raids Again (Note: ゴジラの逆襲, Gojira no Gyakushū lit. 'Godzilla's Counterattack')	Yes	No	No	No		
1955	Half Human (Note: 獣人雪男, Jūjin Yuki Otoko lit. 'Beast-Man Snow-Man')	Yes	No	No	No		
1955	Ginrin (Note: 銀輪 lit. 'Silver Ring')	Yes	No	No	No		
1956	The Maiden Courtesan (Note: 乱菊物語, Rangiku Monogatari lit. 'A Tale of Rangiku')	Yes	No	No	No		
1956	The Legend of the White Serpent (Note: 白夫人の妖恋, Byaku fujin no yōren lit. 'The Love of Madame White')	Yes	No	No	No		
1956	Jun'ai (Note: 殉愛, Jun'ai)	Yes	No	No	No		
1956	Rodan (Note: 空の大怪獣 ラドン, Sora no Daikaijū Radon lit. 'Giant Monster of the Sky: Radon')	Yes	No	No	No		
1957	Throne of Blood (Note: 蜘蛛巣城, Kumonosu-jō lit. 'The Castle of Spider's Web')	Yes	No	No	No	Uncredited	
1957	The Paradise Island Story (Note: 極楽島物語, Gokuraku-tō Monogatari)	Yes	No	No	No		
1957	The Mysterians (Note: 地球防衛軍, Chikyū Bōeigun lit. 'Earth Defense Force')	Yes	No	No	No		
1958	The H-Man (Note: 美女と液体人間, Bijo to Ekitai-ningen lit. 'Beauty and the Liquid People')	Yes	No	No	No		
1958	Varan the Unbelievable (Note: 大怪獣バラン, Daikaijū Baran lit. 'Giant Monster Varan')	Yes	No	No	No		
1958	The Hidden Fortress (Note: 隠し砦の三悪人, Kakushi Toride no San Akunin lit. 'The Three Villains of the Hidden Fortress')	Yes	No	No	No	Uncredited	
1959	Inao: Story of an Iron Arm (Note: 鉄腕投手 稲尾物語, Tetsuwan Tōshu Inao Monogatari)	Yes	No	No	No		
1959	Monkey Sun (Note: 孫悟空, Son Gokū lit. 'Sun Wukong')	Yes	No	No	No	Remake of Son Gokū (1940)	
1959	Submarine I-57 Will Not Surrender (Note: 潜水艦イ-57降伏せず, Sensuikan I-57 kofuku sezu)	Yes	No	No	No		
1959	The Three Treasures (Note: 日本誕生, Nippon Tanjō lit. 'The Birth of Japan')	Yes	No	No	No		
1959	Battle in Outer Space (Note: 宇宙大戦争, Uchū Daisensō lit. 'The Great Space War')	Yes	No	No	No		
1960	The Secret of the Telegian (Note: 電送人間, Densō Ningen lit. 'The Electrically Transmitted Man')	Yes	No	No	No		
1960	Storm Over the Pacific (Note: ハワイ・ミッドウェイ大海空戦 太平洋の嵐, Hawai Middouei daikaikusen: Taiheiyo no arashi lit. 'Hawaii-Midway Battle of the Sea and Sky: Storm in the Pacific Ocean')	Yes	No	No	No		
1960	The Human Vapor (Note: ガス人間第1号, Gasu Ningen Daiichigō lit. 'Gas Man No. 1')	Yes	No	No	No		
1961	The Story of Osaka Castle (Note: 大坂城物語, Ōsaka-jō Monogatari)	Yes	No	No	No		
1961	Mothra (Note: モスラ, Mosura)	Yes	No	No	No		
1961	Blood on the Sea (Note: 紅の海, Kurenai no umi lit. 'The Crimson Sea')	Yes	No	No	No		
1961	The Youth and His Amulet (Note: ゲンと不動明王, Gen to Fudōmyōh lit. 'Gen and Fudōmyōh')	Yes	No	No	No		
1961	The Last War (Note: 世界大戦争, Sekai Daisensō; lit. 'The Great World War')	Yes	No	No	No		
1962	The Crimson Sky (Note: 紅の空, Kurenai no Sora)	Yes	No	No	No		
1962	Gorath (Note: 妖星ゴラス, Yōsei Gorasu lit. 'Ominous Star Gorath')	Yes	No	No	No		
1962	The Big Wave (Note: 大津波, Daitsunami lit. 'The Giant Tsunami')	Yes	No	No	No	Completed in 1961	
1962	King Kong vs. Godzilla (Note: キングコング対ゴジラ, Kingu Kongu tai Gojira)	Yes	No	No	No		
1962	The Story of Shim Cheong (Note: 대심청전, Dae Sim Cheong-jeon)	Yes	No	No	No		
1962	Chūshingura: Hana no Maki, Yuki no Maki (Note: 忠臣蔵 花の巻 雪の巻 lit. 'Chushingura: Story of Flower, Story of Snow')	Yes	No	No	No	Uncredited	
1963	Attack Squadron! (Note: 太平洋の翼, Taiheiyō no Tsubasa lit. 'Wings of the Pacific')	Yes	No	No	No		
1963	The Love Eterne (Note: 梁山伯與祝英台, lit. 'Liang Shanbo and Zhu Yingtai')	Yes	No	No	No		
1963	Legacy of the 500,000 (Note: 五十万人の遺産, Gojuman-nin no Isan)	Yes	No	No	No		
1963	The Siege of Fort Bismarck (Note: 青島要塞爆撃命令, Chintao yōsai bakugeki meirei)	Yes	No	No	No		
1963	Matango (Note: マタンゴ)	Yes	No	No	No		
1963	The Lost World of Sinbad (Note: 大盗賊, Daitōzoku lit. 'The Great Thief')	Yes	No	No	No		
1963	Atragon (Note: 海底軍艦, Kaitei Gunkan lit. 'The Undersea Warship')	Yes	No	No	No		
1964	Whirlwind (Note: 士魂魔道 大竜巻, Shikonmado Daitatsumaki)	Yes	No	No	No		
1964	Mothra vs. Godzilla (Note: モスラ対ゴジラ, Mosura tai Gojira)	Yes	No	No	No		
1964	The Rabble (Note: がらくた, Garakuta)	Yes	No	No	No		
1964	Dogora (Note: 宇宙大怪獣ドゴラ, Uchū Daikaijū Dogora lit. 'Giant Space Monster Dogora')	Yes	No	No	No		
1964	Ghidorah, the Three-Headed Monster (Note: 三大怪獣 地球最大の決戦, San Daikaijū: Chikyū Saidai no Kessen lit. 'Three Giant Monsters: Earth's Greatest Battle')	Yes	No	No	No		
1965	None but the Brave (Note: 勇者のみ, Yūsha Nomi lit. 'Only the Brave')	Yes	No	No	No		
1965	Retreat from Kiska (Note: 太平洋奇跡の作戦 キスカ, Taiheiyō kiseki no sakusen Kisuka lit. 'Miraculous Pacific Operation: Kisuka')	Yes	No	No	No		
1965	Frankenstein vs. Baragon (Note: フランケンシュタイン対地底怪獣(バラゴン), Furankenshutain tai Chitei Kaijū Baragon; lit. 'Frankenstein vs. Subterranean Monster Baragon')	Yes	No	No	No		
1965	The Crazy Adventure (Note: 大冒険, Daibōken lit. 'Great Adventure')	Yes	No	No	No		
1965	Invasion of Astro-Monster (Note: 怪獣大戦争, Kaijū Dai-sensō lit. 'The Giant Monster War')	Yes	No	No	No		
1966	The Adventure in Taklamakan (Note: 奇巌城の冒険, Kiganjō no bōken lit. 'Strange Rock Castle Adventure')	Yes	No	No	No	Uncredited	
1966	Zero Fighter (Note: ゼロ・ファイター 大空, Zero faita dai kūsen lit. 'Zero Fighter Great Air Battle')	Yes	No	No	No		
1966	The War of the Gargantuas (Note: フランケンシュタインの怪獣 サンダ対ガイラ, Furankenshutain no Kaijū: Sanda tai Gaira lit. 'Frankenstein's Monsters: Sanda vs. Gaira')	Yes	No	No	No		
1966	Ebirah, Horror of the Deep (Note: ゴジラ・エビラ・モスラ 南海の大決闘, Gojira Ebira Mosura Nankai no Dai-kettō lit. 'Godzilla, Ebirah, Mothra: Big Duel in the South Seas')	Yes	No	No	No		
1967	King Kong Escapes (Note: キングコングの逆襲, Kingu Kongu no Gyakushū lit. 'King Kong's Counterattack')	Yes	No	No	No		
1967	Ultraman: Monster Movie Feature (Note: 長篇怪獣映画 ウルトラマン, Chōhen Kaijū Eiga Urutoraman)	No	No	No	No	Supervisor	
1967	Son of Godzilla (Note: 怪獣島の決戦 ゴジラの息子, Kaijū-tō no Kessen: Gojira no Musuko lit. 'Monster Island's Decisive Battle: Godzilla's Son')	No	No	No	Yes		
1968	Destroy All Monsters (Note: 怪獣総進撃, Kaijū Sō-shingeki lit. 'Monster All-out Attack')	No	No	No	Yes		
1968	Admiral Yamamoto (Note: 連合艦隊司令長官 山本五十六, Rengō Kantai Shirei Chōkan Yamamoto Isoroku; lit. 'Isoroku Yamamoto: Commander-in-Chief of the Combined Fleet')	Yes	No	No	No		
1969	The Crazy Cats' Big Explosion (Note: クレージーの大爆発, Kureji no daibakuhatsu)	No	No	No	Yes	Uncredited	
1969	Latitude Zero (Note: 緯度0大作戦, Ido Zero Daisakusen; lit. 'The Great Latitude 0 Operation')	Yes	No	No	No		
1969	Battle of the Japan Sea (Note: 日本海大海戦, Nihonkai Daikaisen lit. 'The Great Battle in the Japan Sea')	Yes	No	No	No		
1969	All Monsters Attack (Note: ゴジラ・ミニラ・ガバラ オール怪獣大進撃, Gojira Minira Gabara Ōru Kaijū Dai-shingeki lit. 'Godzilla, Minilla, and Gabara: All Monsters Attack')	No	No	No	Yes	Also participated in editing	
1970	Birth of the Japanese Islands (Note: 日本の自然と日本人の夢, Nihon no Shizen to Nihonjin no Yume lit. 'The Nature of Japan and the Dreams of Japanese')	Yes	No	No	No	Produced in 1969	

== Television ==
Television work by Eiji Tsuburaya
Year	Title	Credited as	Notes	Ref(s)
Year	Title	Supervisor	Notes	Ref(s)
1957	Ninja Arts of Sanada Castle (Note: 忍術真田城, Ninjutsu Sanada-jō)	Special effects		
1959–1960	Mighty Atom (Note: 鉄腕アトム, Tetsuwan Atomu)	Special effects	Uncredited	
1960	Everyone's Occupation (Note: みんなの職業, Min na no Shokugyō)	No	Himself; episode "Video Magician: Special Skills Director" (Note: 映像の魔術師 特技監督, Eizō no Majutsu-shi Tokugi Kantoku)	
1962	Japanese Standards (Note: 日本の水準, Nihon no suijun)	No	Himself; May 15 episode	
1966	Ultra Q (Note: ウルトラQ, Urutora Kyū)	Yes	Also producer	
1966	Modern Leaders (Note: 現代の主役, Gendai no shuyaku)	No	Himself; episode, "The Father of Ultra Q" (Note: ウルトラQのおやじ, Urutora Kyū no Oyaji)	
1966–1967	Ultraman (Note: ウルトラマン, Urutoraman)	Yes	Also developer	
1967–1968	Ultraseven (Note: ウルトラセブン, Urutora Sebun)	Yes		
1968	Mighty Jack (Note: マイティジャック, Maiti Jakku)	Yes		
1968	Fight! Mighty Jack (Note: 戦え！マイティジャック, Tatakae! Maiti Jakku)	Yes		
1968	Operation: Mystery! (Note: 怪奇大作戦, Kaiki Daisakusen lit. 'Mysterious Strategy')	Yes		
1973	Horror Theater Unbalance (Note: 恐怖劇場アンバランス, Kyōfu Gekijō Anbaransu)	Yes	Produced in 1969	
