= Ichirō Arishima =

Japanese actor

- 有島 一郎
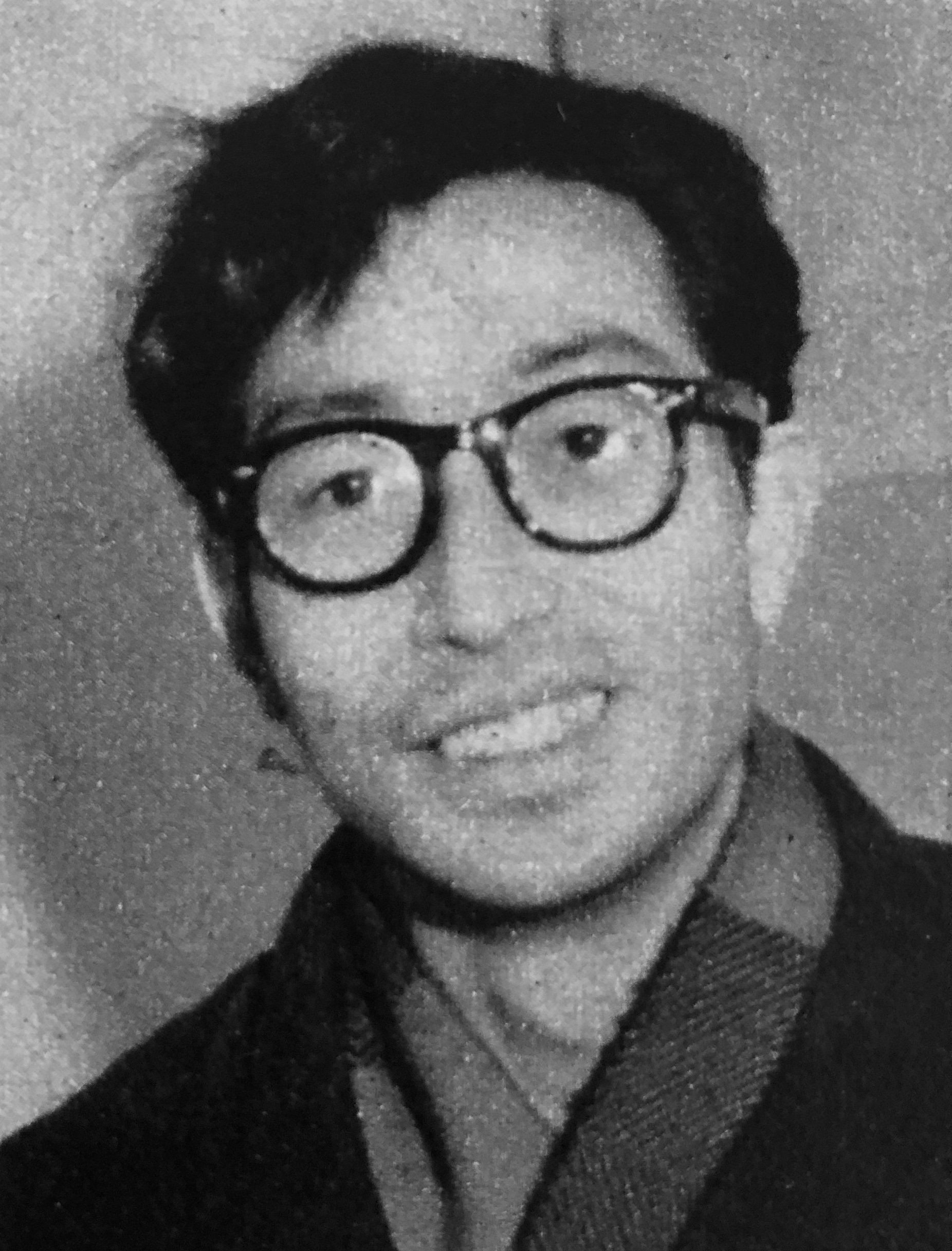
- Arishima in 1955
- Born: Tadao Oshima; March 1, 1916; Nagoya, Aichi, Japan
- Died: July 20, 1987 (aged 71); Uchisaiwaichō, Chiyoda, Tokyo, Japan
- Occupation: Actor
- Years active: 1933–1987

Ichirō Arishima (有島 一郎, Arishima Ichirō; March 1, 1916 – July 20, 1987) was a Japanese comedian and actor. Nicknamed "The Japanese Chaplin", he is best known outside Japan for his appearance as Tako, the promoter of King Kong in King Kong vs. Godzilla (1962).

== Biography ==
Arishima's real name was Tadao Oshima. He was born in Nagoya and both of his parents died when he was a teenager. His love of the theater began in childhood, and he moved to Tokyo in 1936 to pursue that interest. He spent the next decade working with various theatrical troupes until he made his film debut in 1947, with Shochiku Studios. He became a household name in Japan after his move to Toho in 1955. At Toho he was featured in two very popular series, the "Wakadaishō series" ("Young Guy") movies starring Yūzō Kayama, and the "Shacho" ("Company President") movies featuring the Crazy Cats (クレージーキャッツ) comedy team. In addition to Ishirō Honda's King Kong vs. Godzilla, Arishima appeared in two Toho fantasy films directed by Senkichi Taniguchi: The Lost World of Sinbad (Daitozoku) (1963) and The Adventure of Taklamakan (Kiganjō no bōken) (1966). In 1972, he left Toho and a freelance actor.

Arishima's slight physical build contrasted well with the portly comedian Frankie Sakai, leading to their teaming in several comedies. He was also popular on several television shows, one of his last roles being "Kanō Gorōzaemon," the elderly advisor to the shogun in Abarenbō Shōgun.

== Filmography ==
=== Film ===
Film
Year	Title	Role	Notes
1953	Ojōsan shachō	Tetsutaro Kaitani	
1954	Shichihenge tanuki goten	Yamizaemon	
1955	Midori haruka ni		
1958	The Badger Palace		
1958	Tōkyō no kyūjitsu	Photographer	
1959	The Birth of Japan	Gods of Yaoyorozu	
1961	Daigaku no Wakadaishō	Tanuma Hisataro	
1962	King Kong vs. Godzilla	Mr. Tako	
1962	Chūshingura: Hana no Maki, Yuki no Maki	Denpachirô Okado	
1963	The Lost World of Sinbad	Sennin	
1964	You Can Succeed, Too	Ômori	
1965	Ironfinger	Detective Tezuka	
1967	Kyu-chan no Dekkai Yume		
1970	Machibuse	Tokubei	
1979	Nihon no Fixer	Heikichi Shibuya	
1987	Maison Ikkoku	Otonashi's Father	

=== Television ===
- Taikoki (1965) as Sorori Shinzaemon
- Daichūshingura (1971) as Yahei Horibe
- Unmeitōge (1974) as Takuan Sōhō
- Taiyō ni Hoero! (1974 ep.85) (1977 ep.240)
- Naruto Hichō (1977–78)
- Hissatsu Shigotonin V (1985 ep.11)
