= Ereki no Wakadaishō =

Eleki no Wakadaishō
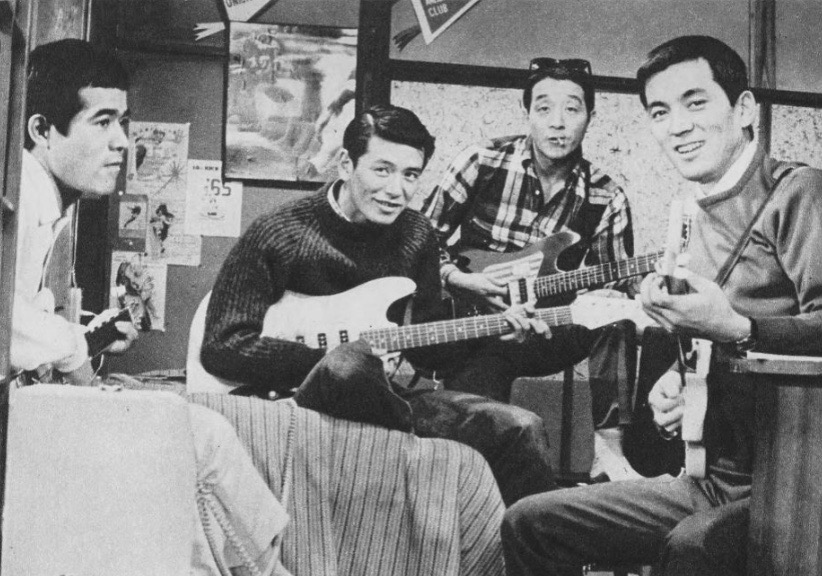
- Directed by: Katsumi Iwauchi
- Written by: Yasuo Tanami
- Starring: Yūzō Kayama; Ichirō Arishima; Takeshi Terauchi
- Music by: Kenjiro Hirose
- Distributed by: Toho
- Release date: December 19, 1965
- Running time: 94 minutes
- Country: Japan
- Language: Japanese

Campus A-Go-Go (エレキの若大将; "The young electric guitar wizard") is a 1965 Japanese film starring Yūzō Kayama. It is the sixth in the Wakadaishō series of films.

The film was inspired by the mid-sixties electric guitar boom created by the popularity of groups such as The Beatles and The Ventures. The sport featured in this film is American football.

== Cast ==
- Yūzō Kayama as Yuichi Tanuma ("Wakadaishō")
- Ichirō Arishima as Kyūtarō, Yuichi's father
- Machiko Naka as Teruko Tanuma, Yuichi's sister
- Choko Iida as Riki, Yuichi's grandmother
- Kunie Tanaka as Shinjiro Ishiyama ("Aodaishō")
- Minoru Takada
- Toshio Kurosawa as Izawa
- Tatsuyoshi Ehara as Eguchi
- Yuriko Hoshi as Sumiko Hoshida
- Ken Uehara
- Takeshi Terauchi as Takashi
