= Kumi Mizuno =

Japanese actress (born 1937)

- 水野久美
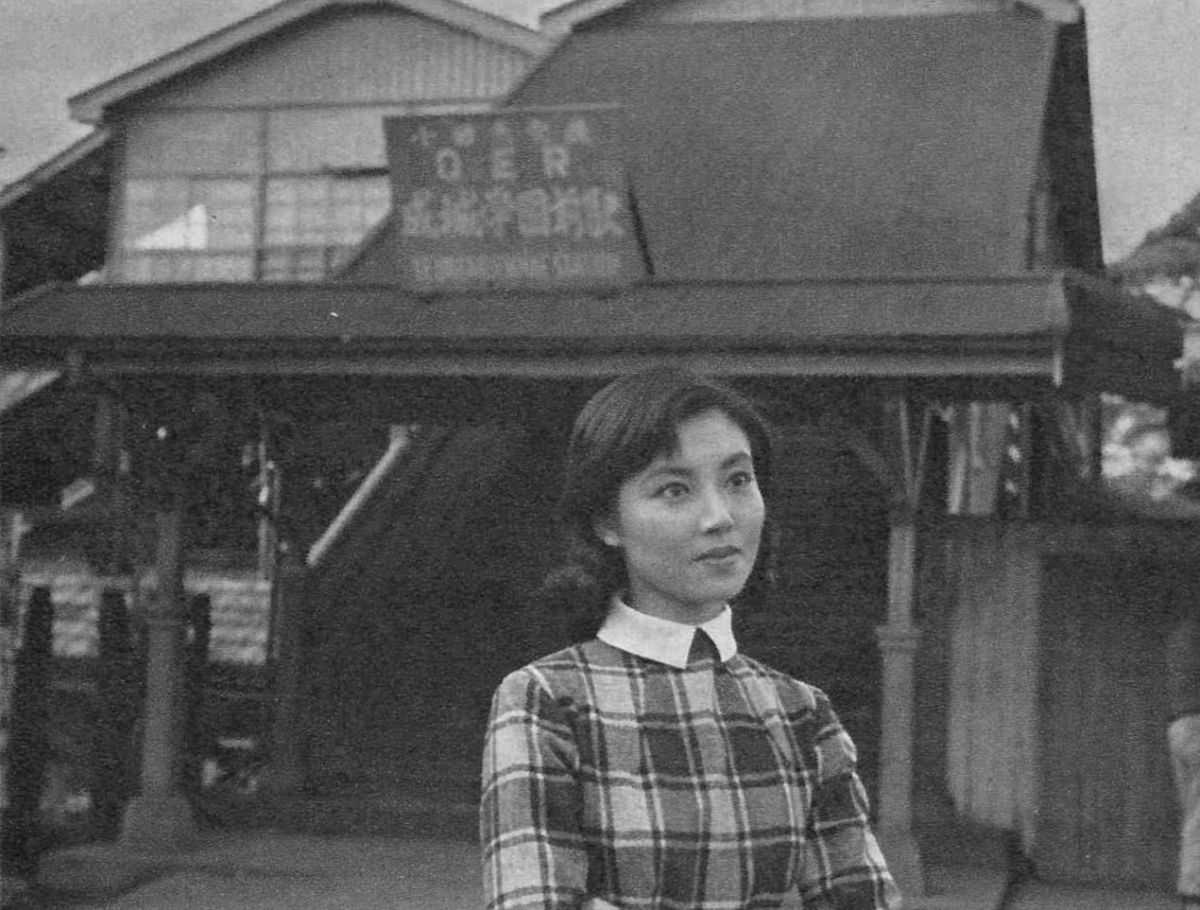
- Mizuno in 1958
- Born: Maya Igarashi (五十嵐 麻耶); January 1, 1937 (age 89); Niigata, Japan
- Occupation: Actress
- Years active: 1950-present
- Notable credit(s): Invasion of Astro-Monster as Miss Namikawa, Frankenstein vs. Baragon as Dr. Sueko Togami, The War of the Gargantuas as Dr. Akemi Togawa; Godzilla vs. the Sea Monster as Dayo
- Spouse: Gaku Yamamoto (1964-1969) (divorced)

Kumi Mizuno (水野久美, Mizuno Kumi; born 1 January 1937) is a Japanese actress best known for appearing in several Toho kaiju films of the 1960s and early 1970s.

== Early life ==
Mizuno was born Maya Igarashi on 1 January 1937 in Sanjō Niigata prefecture, Japan. She was acquainted with Giant Baba, her junior by one year, who is also from Sanjō. She enrolled and eventually graduated from the acting school of Haiyuza Theater company with Mari Shimizu and began a professional career in film in 1957 in Crazy Society (Shochiku). In 1958 she appeared in Nemuri Kyōshirō: Record of an Outlaw : Demon-blade Hell (Toho).

== Career ==
Her most famous roles include Miss Namikawa in Invasion of Astro-Monster, Dr. Sueko Togami in Frankenstein Conquers the World, and the island girl Dayo in Godzilla vs. the Sea Monster. She is also known for her role as Azami in the 1959 epic The Birth of Japan. By the time she started working on A Bridge for Us Alone (1958), her second movie, her name had changed to Kumi Mizuno. Mizuno first worked with director Ishirō Honda in Seniors, Juniors, Co-Workers in 1959. She would later work with Honda in Matango, Frankenstein Conquers the World, Ebirah, Horror of the Deep, Gorath, Invasion of Astro-Monster and The War of the Gargantuas.

In 1991, she played Kanako Yanagawa in Kihachi Okamoto's Rainbow Kids.

Mizuno returned to the kaiju genre for 2002's Godzilla Against Mechagodzilla, and again for 2004's Godzilla: Final Wars.

== Filmography ==
=== Films ===
- Crazy Society (1957)
- A Bridge for Us Alone (1958), Chie Kimura
- A Holiday in Tokyo (1958)
- The Spell of the Hidden Gold (1958)
- Herringbone Clouds (1958)
- The Three Treasures (1959), Azami
- One Day I... (1959), Hideko Kawamura
- Seniors, Juniors, Co-Workers (1959)
- Lips Forbidden to Talk (1959)
- Fox and Tanuki (1959), Sagawa Kayoko
- Whistle in My Heart (1959)
- Westward Desperado (1960), Hashima
- The Gambling Samurai (1960), Kiku
- Wanton Journey (1960)
- Challenge to Live (1961)
- The Merciless Trap (1961)
- The Crimson Sea (1961)
- Witness Killed (1961)
- Counterstroke (1961)
- Big Shots Die at Dawn (1961)
- The Underworld Bullet Marks (1961)
- Kill the Killer! (1961)
- Gorath (1962), Takiko Nomura
- Chushingura (1962), Saho
- The Crimson Sky (1962)
- Operation X (1962)
- Operation Enemy Fort (1962)
- Weed of Crime (1962)
- Matango (1963), Mami Sekiguchi
- Samurai Pirate (1963), Miwa, Rebel Leader
- Interpol Code 8 (1963), Saeko Kinomiya
- Sink or Swim (1963), Tomie Tazawa
- Warring Clans (1963)
- Trap of Suicide Kilometer (1964)
- Blood and Diamonds (1964)
- Whirlwind (1964), Witch
- Keg of Gunpowder (1964), Rumi, #6
- Invasion of Astro-Monster (1965), Miss Namikawa
- White Rose of Hong Kong (1965)
- Frankenstein vs. Baragon (1965), Dr. Sueko Togami
- Ebirah, Horror of the Deep (1966), Daiyo, Infant Islander
- The War of the Gargantuas (1966), Akemi, Stewart's Assistant
- The Killing Bottle (1967)
- Love is in the Green Wind (1974), Mother
- Mysterious Robber Ruby (1988)
- Rainbow Kids (1991), Kanako Yanagawa, 1st Daughter
- Florence My Love (1991)
- Graduation Journey: I Came from Japan (1993)
- Godzilla Against Mechagodzilla (2002), Machiko Tsuge, Prime Minister
- Godzilla: Final Wars (2004), Akiko Namikawa, E.D.F. Commander
- Amanogawa (2019)

=== Television ===
- Segodon (2018), Saigō Takamori's grandmother

== Honours ==
- Kinuyo Tanaka Award (2017)
