= Scattered Clouds =

1967 Japanese film

- Theatrical release poster

Japanese name
- Kanji: 乱れ雲
- Directed by: Mikio Naruse
- Written by: Nobuo Yamada
- Produced by: Sanezumi Fujimoto; Masakatsu Kaneko
- Starring: Yōko Tsukasa; Yūzō Kayama
- Cinematography: Yuzuru Aizawa
- Edited by: Eiji Ooi
- Music by: Tōru Takemitsu
- Production company: Toho
- Distributed by: Toho
- Release date: 18 November 1967 (Japan)
- Running time: 108 minutes
- Country: Japan
- Language: Japanese

Scattered Clouds aka Two in the Shadow (Japanese: 乱れ雲, Hepburn: Midaregumo) is a 1967 Japanese drama film directed by Mikio Naruse starring Yōko Tsukasa and Yūzō Kayama. It was Naruse's final film after a long lasting career which started in 1930.

== Plot ==
Shortly before Yumiko's and her husband Hiroshi's (an employee of the Ministry of Economy) departure for the United States, he is killed in a car accident. The car's driver, Shiro, although acquitted in the following hearing, feels guilty and offers Yumiko to pay a monthly instalment. Yumiko first rejects, but when her husband's family disowns her, leaving her without an inheritance, she finally accepts the money. Due to her precarious financial situation, she decides to return to her hometown and work in the inn run by her sister near Lake Towada. By coincidence, Shiro is reassigned by his employers to the same area. Although Yumiko and Shiro slowly develop a mutual affection, finally leading to a love affair, Yumiko can't leave her past behind, which returns with all its power when she witnesses an accident that reminds her of Hiroshi's death. In the end, Shiro is transferred again, to a far away office in Lahore, Pakistan.

== Cast ==
- Yōko Tsukasa as Yumiko
- Yūzō Kayama as Shiro Mishima
- Mitsuko Kusabue as Ayako, Yumiko's sister
- Mitsuko Mori as Katsuko, Yumiko's sister-in-law
- Mie Hama as Teruko
- Daisuke Katō as Hayashida
- Yoshio Tsuchiya as Hiroshi, Yumiko's husband
- Yū Fujiki as Ishikawa, Ayako's husband
- Tadao Nakamaru as Fujiwara
- Kumeko Urabe as Nui, Shiro's mother

== Legacy ==
Scattered Clouds was presented at the Berkeley Art Museum and Pacific Film Archive in 1981 and at the Museum of Modern Art in 1985 and 1987, the second time with an introduction by historian Donald Richie. In 2015, it was shown at the 39th Hong Kong International Film Festival as part of a retrospective on the director.

== Bibliography ==
- Russell, Catherine (2008). The Cinema of Naruse Mikio: Women and Japanese Modernity. Durham and London: Duke University Press. ISBN 978-0-8223-4290-8.
