= Sanjuro =

1962 Japanese jidaigeki film by Akira Kurosawa

- Theatrical release poster

Japanese name
- Kanji: 椿三十郎
Transcriptions
- Revised Hepburn: Tsubaki Sanjūrō
- Directed by: Akira Kurosawa
- Screenplay by: Ryūzō Kikushima; Hideo Oguni; Akira Kurosawa
- Based on: Hibi Heian by Shugoro Yamamoto
- Produced by: Tomoyuki Tanaka; Ryūzō Kikushima
- Starring: Toshiro Mifune; Tatsuya Nakadai; Keiju Kobayashi; Yūzō Kayama
- Cinematography: Fukuzo Koizumi; Takao Saito
- Edited by: Akira Kurosawa
- Music by: Masaru Sato
- Production companies: Toho; Kurosawa Production
- Distributed by: Toho
- Release date: January 1, 1962 (Japan)
- Running time: 95 minutes
- Country: Japan
- Language: Japanese
- Box office: ¥450.1 million (Japan rentals)

Sanjuro (Japanese: 椿三十郎, Hepburn: Tsubaki Sanjūrō) is a 1962 Japanese jidaigeki film directed, co-written and edited by Akira Kurosawa, starring Toshiro Mifune. It is a sequel to Kurosawa's 1961 Yojimbo.

Originally an adaptation of the Shūgorō Yamamoto novel Hibi Heian, the script was altered following the success of the previous year's Yojimbo to incorporate the lead character of that film.

== Plot ==
Nine young samurai believe that the lord chamberlain, Mutsuta, is corrupt after he tore up their petition against fraud at court. One of them tells the superintendent Kikui of this and he agrees to intervene. As the nine meet secretly to discuss this at a shrine, a rōnin overhears and cautions them against trusting the superintendent. While at first they do not believe him, he saves them from an ambush. But as their rescuer is about to leave, he realises that Mutsuta and his family must now be in danger and decides to stay and help.

By the time the samurai get to Mutsuta's house, the chamberlain has been abducted and his wife and daughter are held prisoner there. Following the rōnin's suggestion, a servant from the house gets the guards drunk, allowing the samurai to free the women. The group then hides in a house next door to the superintendent's compound. When Mutsuta's wife asks the rōnin his name, he looks out of the window at the surrounding camellia trees and says it is Tsubaki Sanjūrō (椿三十郎), literally "thirty-year-old camellia." The lady then criticises "Sanjuro" for killing too frequently and insists that "the best sword is kept in its sheath."

Sanjuro decides to get closer to the corrupt officials and joins their henchman Hanbei, who had previously offered him a job after the ambush at the shrine. Although the samurai distrustfully decide to keep watch on him, Sanjuro realises he is being followed as he walks along with Hanbei, and their shadows are easily captured and bound. Made to believe that a much larger group may be involved, Hanbei leaves to request reinforcements. Sanjuro then frees the four captured samurai, although having to kill all their guards. He tells the four to leave him tied up, then explains to Hanbei on his return that he did not wish to die in a cause in which he had no stake.

The chamberlain's whereabouts are not discovered until the next day, when Mutsuta's wife and daughter find a piece of the torn petition in the small stream that flows from the superintendent's compound past their hideout. Since an attack on the officials is impossible with the compound full of armed men, Sanjuro hatches a plan to get the army away by reporting to Hanbei that he saw the rebels at a temple where he was sleeping. Meanwhile he has told his group of samurai that he will send the signal to attack by floating large numbers of camellias down the stream.

The first part of the plan works, with the superintendent's forces rushing off to the temple; however, Hanbei becomes suspicious after catching Sanjuro trying to drop the camellias into the stream and ties him up. Just as Hanbei is preparing to kill him, the remaining corrupt officials realise that Sanjuro has tricked them—his description of the temple was incorrect. They convince Hanbei not to waste any further time and instead catch up with the superintendent's forces and have them return as soon as possible. However, Sanjuro tricks the officials into giving the signal for the samurai to come to the rescue. Hanbei returns to find he has been made a fool of once again.

Mutsuta is restored to his position and the superintendent commits hara-kiri, much to the chamberlain's regret, as he wished to avoid a public scandal. As his family and the loyal samurai are celebrating, they discover that Sanjuro has slipped away. The samurai race off to find Sanjuro and Hanbei about to duel.

Sanjuro is reluctant to fight and tries to dissuade Hanbei, but Hanbei is furious at his loss of dignity and declares he can only find peace by killing Sanjuro. Hanbei draws his sword, but the faster Sanjuro kills him. When the young samurai cheer his victory, Sanjuro becomes angry, stating that Hanbei was just like him: "a sword unsheathed." He also warns them that he will kill them if they follow him. His admirers can only kneel and bow as he walks away.

== Cast ==
Actor	Role
Toshiro Mifune	Sanjuro Tsubaki
Tatsuya Nakadai	Hanbei Muroto, Kikui's henchman
Keiju Kobayashi	Captured sentry
Yūzō Kayama	Iori Izaka, leader of the samurai
Kunie Tanaka	Yasukawa, a samurai
Yoshio Tsuchiya	Hirose, a samurai
Akihiko Hirata	Terada, a samurai
Reiko Dan	Chidori, Mutsuta's daughter
Takako Irie	Mutsuta's wife
Takashi Shimura	Kurofuji, Head of the Guard
Kamatari Fujiwara	Takebayashi, the steward
Sachio Sakai	Ashigaru, foot soldier
Masao Shimizu	Kikui, the superintendent
Yūnosuke Itō	Mutsuta, the chamberlain
Toshiko Higuchi	Koiso, the chambermaid

== Production ==
The story is primarily based on Shūgorō Yamamoto's short story Hibi Heian (日日平安; lit. "Peaceful Days"). Originally Sanjuro was to be a straight adaptation of the story. After the success of Yojimbo the studio decided to resurrect its popular antihero, and Kurosawa reimagined the script accordingly. But despite a certain element of continuity, the eventual film turned out to be more than just a sequel to Yojimbo for the hero goes on to develop in character from the swashbuckling original.

He is, as before, a masterless samurai who preserves his anonymity by the same means. When asked his name in Yojimbo he looks outside and names himself mulberry (Kuwabatake); in Sanjuro he chooses a camellia (Tsubaki). In both cases he gives Sanjūrō (thirty-year-old) as his given name, although in both films he admits to being closer to forty. Having the ronin take the name of a local plant rather than a great house or clan reflects a populist turn in contemporary samurai movies. A crucial difference between Yojimbo and Sanjuro, however, is that there is little connection to the Western genre in the sequel. The original was set in an out-of-the-way border town where the hero deals ruthlessly with local thugs, while in Sanjuro the action centres on a Japanese feudal power struggle in a clan fortress town. There the hero realises that Hanbei, his main opponent, is a man much like himself: a social outsider (an "unsheathed sword" in the words of the chamberlain’s wife) free to pick his own side in a conflict. The difference between them is only in the motives behind their choice.

There is also a greater element of social comedy, with the seasoned fighter constantly hampered by the failure of the young men whom he chooses to help to grasp the reality of the situation. But while he is their superior in tactics, the lady he has just rescued confounds him by insisting that he restrain himself, since killing people is a bad habit. Although there has to be some killing, largely as result of the inept actions of his young allies, the only truly violent moment comes at the very end in the duel between Sanjuro and Hanbei. From this he walks away in a fury because his young admirers are still unable to read human nature and understand the significance of what has just happened.

The final duel between Sanjuro and Hanbei ends with Sanjuro striking Hanbei with his sword, causing Hanbei's body to issue a dramatic spray of blood in a show of extreme graphic violence, unusual for the time the film was made. Despite contradicting claims about this being the result of a mechanical failure, Kurosawa claimed in a 1980 interview that the effect was intentional, done as an "experiment". He derided later filmmakers who replicated the blood spray effect in their own films, which he felt detracted from the exploration of Sanjuro's character in the scene. Some publications, such as Far Out, have noted the moment's influence on subsequent action films, splatter films, and video games.

== Release ==
Sanjuro was released on January 1, 1962 in Japan, where it was distributed by Toho. The film was also released in the same year in the United States.

=== Box office ===
Sanjuro was Toho's highest-grossing film in 1962, coming second place for the highest grossing Japanese productions in 1962. It earned ¥450.1 million in distributor rentals at the Japanese box office in 1962, exceeding King Kong vs. Godzilla, which had sold 11.2 million tickets in Japan that year.

=== Reception ===
The film has been positively received by critics. It holds a 100% rating on the review aggregator Rotten Tomatoes based on 27 reviews, with a weighted average of 8.6/10. The site's consensus reads: "Technically impressive and superbly acted, Sanjuro is a funny, action-packed samurai adventure featuring outstanding cinematography and a charismatic performance from Toshiro Mifune". In 2009, the film was voted at No. 59 on the list of The Greatest Japanese Films of All Time by Japanese film magazine Kinema Junpo.

== Legacy ==
Mifune's sword fighting in the film was used in an extensive illustrated example of "samurai virtuosity with his sword" in This Is Kendo, a 1989 kendo manual published in English.

== Remake ==
The film was remade as Tsubaki Sanjuro in 2007 by Yoshimitsu Morita and starring Yūji Oda in the title role.
