= The Cinema of Naruse Mikio =

Nonfiction book

The Cinema of Naruse Mikio: Women and Japanese Modernity
- Cover of the 2008 Duke University Press edition
- Author: Catherine Russell
- Language: English
- Publisher: Duke University Press
- Publication date: 2008
- Dewey Decimal: 791.430233092
- LC Class: PN1998.3.N37 R87

The Cinema of Naruse Mikio: Women and Japanese Modernity is a nonfiction book by Catherine Russell, published in 2008 by Duke University Press. It is about the films of Mikio Naruse.

It was the first English-language full length book to explore the director's works. The book focuses on the director's interactions with female actresses, including Setsuko Hara, Hideko Takamine, Kinuyo Tanaka, and Yoko Tsukasa. Rachael Hutchinson of the University of Delaware stated that the fact that Russell did not come from a Japanese speaking background gives the work an "external viewpoint".

== Backgrounds ==
As Russell did not speak Japanese, she used assistants to perform key tasks. She taskes some to do research on the topic, and also had other people read texts and translate for her.

== Contents ==
The book compares Naruse to other directors, and discusses the body of films that was then-released, which numbered 67. The work classifies the films into six categories based on time period, and examines them chronologically. The book explores what "modernity" meant in Naruse's world.

Films adapted from magazines that were intended for popular consumption are explored in the fifth chapter, "The Japanese Woman’s Film of the 1950s."

== Reception ==
William Beard described it as "impressive and valuable".

Jeffrey A. Dym of California State University, Sacramento stated that the research process was able to cover all of the body of existing film work since it was done in a "diligent" manner.

Hutchinson described the work as "groundbreaking", Hutchinson stated that the use of assistants successfully compensated for Russell's lack of ability to speak Japanese.

Reviewer Alastair Phillips described the book as "extensive and engaging".
