= Makoto Satō (actor) =

Japanese actor (1934–2012)

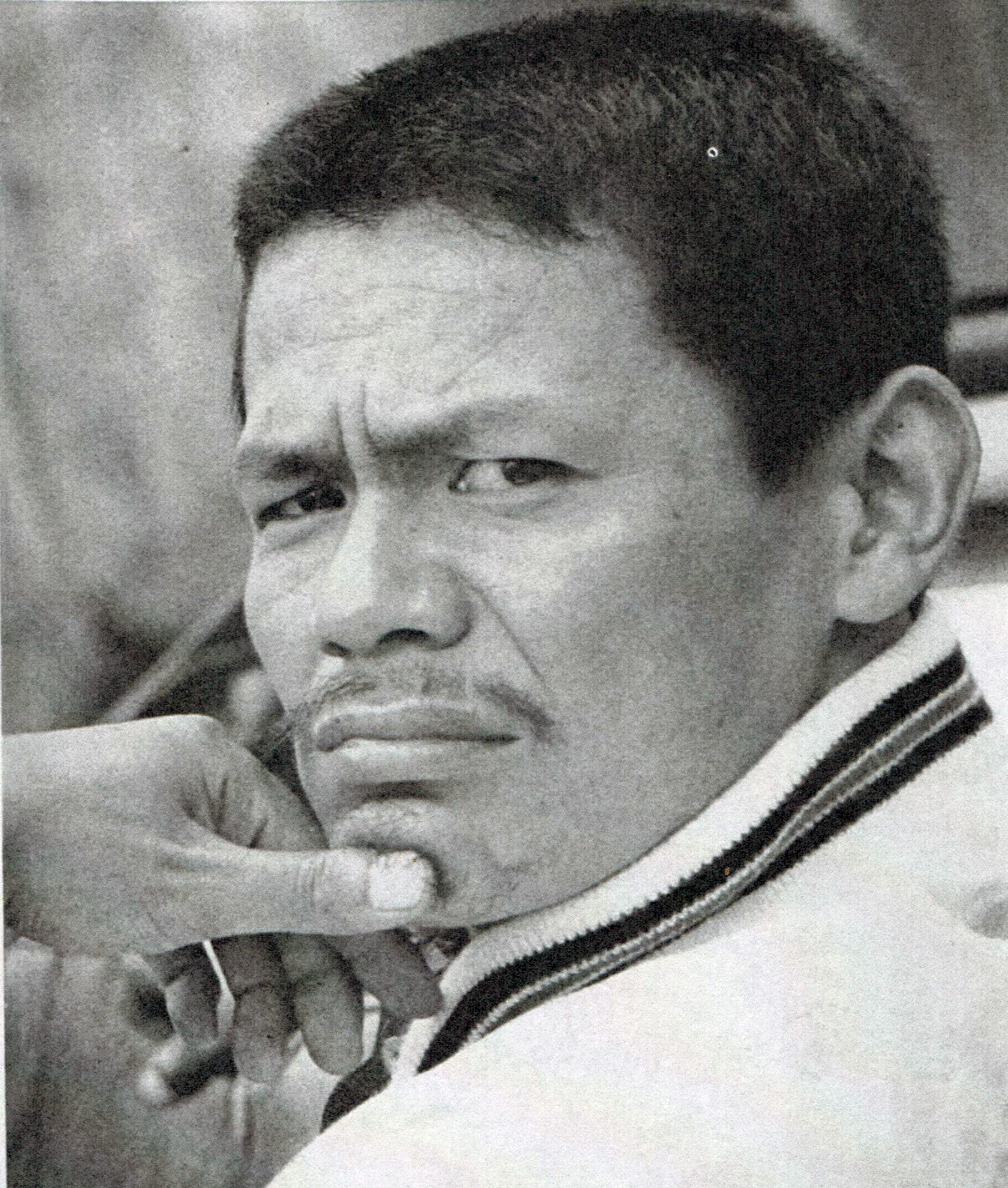
- Satō in 1962
- Born: 18 March 1934; Kanzaki, Saga, Japan
- Died: 6 December 2012 (aged 78)
- Occupation: Actor
- Years active: 1953-2008
- Height: 1.73 m (5 ft 8 in)

Makoto Satō (佐藤允, Satō Makoto; 18 March 1934 – 6 December 2012) was a Japanese film actor. He appeared in more than one hundred films from 1953 to 2008.

== Filmography ==
Film
Year	Title	Role
1953	Botchan	Student
1957	Sanjûrokunin no jôkyaku	Kondô - Robbery and Murder
1957	Saigo no dasso	Soldier Attacking Tomiko
1957	Tsuki to seppun	actor A
1957	Tôhoku no zunmu-tachi	
1957	Datsugokushû	
1958	Kekkon no subete	
1958	Ryu ni makasero	
1958	The H-Man	Uchida
1958	Wakai kemono	
1958	Yatsu ga satsujinsha da	
1958	Otona niwa wakaranai: Seishun hakusho	
1958	Mikkokusha wa dare ka	
1958	The Hidden Fortress	Yamada foot soldier
1959	Ankokugai no kaoyaku	
1959	Tegami o kakeru	
1959	Yajû shisubeshi	
1959	Daigaku no nijuhachin	
1959	Ori no naka no yarôtachi	
1959	Dokuritsu gurentai	Sergeant Okubo, alias Araki
1959	Bakushô Mito Kômon man'yûki	Sukesaburô Sasaki
1960	The Last Gunfight	Yata
1960	Samurai to oneechan	Kiyoshi Kaô
1960	Gendai Salaryman - Ren'ai bushidô	Shigeo Kawashima
1960	Boku wa dokushin shain	Yûichirô Seki
1960	Storm Over the Pacific	Lt. Matsuura
1960	Oneechan ni makashitoki	Toshiya Hatta
1960	Daigaku no sanzôkutachi	Ibukuro (Stomach)
1960	Ôzora no yarôdomo	
1960	Dokuritsu gurentai nishi-e	
1961	Ankokugai no dankon	Ken Sudô
1961	Nasake muyo no wana	Saburô Ninomiya
1961	Higashi kara kita otoko	
1961	Nakito gozansu	
1961	Arigataya sandogasa	
1961	Kurenai no umi	
1961	Shinku no otoko	
1961	Yato kaze no naka o hashiru	Gale
1961	Ankokugai gekimetsu meirei	
1961	Hoero datsugokushu	
1962	Kurenai no sora	
1962	Dobunezumi sakusen	
1962	Yama-neko sakusen	
1962	Chūshingura: Hana no Maki, Yuki no Maki	Fuwa Kazuemon
1962	Ankokugai no kiba	
1963	Attack Squadron!	Teppei Yano
1963	Sengoku Yaro	Kinoshita Tōkichirō
1963	Chintao yôsai bakugeki meirei	
1963	Dokuritsu kikanjûtai imada shagekichu	
1963	Kokusai himitsu keisatsu: shirei dai hachigo	
1963	Horainu sakusen	
1963	The Lost World of Sinbad	The Black Pirate
1964	Whirlwind	
1967	Japan's Longest Day	Major Hidemasa Koga
1968	Rengô kantai shirei chôkan: Yamamoto Isoroku	Minoru Genda
1968	Samaritan Zatoichi	Yasaburo Kashiwazaki
1968	I, the Executioner	Kawashima
1970	Blind Woman's Curse	Tani
1970	Fuji sanchō	
1974	Executioner	Takeshi Hayato
1975	Torakku yarô: Goiken muyô	Okyô's Brother
1978	Message from Space	Urocco
1980	The Battle of Port Arthur	Toratarō Ushiwaka
1981	Sailor Suit and Machine Gun	Sekine
1982	Tenkōsei	Akio Saitoh
1985	Lonely Heart	Okamoto
1985	Typhoon Club	Hideo
1997	The Eel	Jukichi Takada
1999	Shikoku	Sendo
2000	First Love	
2002	Vengeance for Sale	

== Awards ==
Year	Award	Category	Work(s)	Result
1958	3rd Elan d'or Awards	Newcomer of the Year	Himself	Won
