= Burari Bura-bura Monogatari =

1962 film

- Film poster
- Directed by: Zenzo Matsuyama
- Screenplay by: Zenzo Matsuyama
- Produced by: Sanezumi Fujimoto; Hideyuki Shiino
- Starring: Keiju Kobayashi; Hideko Takamine; Reiko Dan; Norihei Miki; Ko Nishimura
- Cinematography: Hiroshi Murai
- Edited by: Chizuru Hirose
- Music by: Hikaru Hayashi
- Production company: Tokyo Eiga
- Release date: 23 November 1962 (Japan)
- Running time: 98 minutes
- Country: Japan
- Language: Japanese

Burari Bura-bura Monogatari (Japanese: ぶらりぶらぶら物語), also known as My Hobo, is a 1962 Japanese comedy film directed by Zenzo Matsuyama. It was Matsuyama's second film as a director.

== Plot ==
Komako (Hideko Takamine) is a confidence trickster who pretends to be an atom-bomb victim with keloids who is collecting money for charity but actually just has a burn scar. Junpei is a confidence trickster who is beaten up after falsely claiming there is a fly in his udon. They meet in a police station. Komako tells Junpei to get a proper job, then steals his money, food and clothes.

Two children are abandoned by their aunt at Shimonoseki Station, and go with Junpei to Tokyo to find her, visiting many sites along the way, including the Kintai bridge, Himeji Castle and the Kurama Fire Festival. Junpei pretends to be a war victim, a blind man and a cripple to beg money but his begging often ends in failures. When Mariko gets a fever, no-one will treat her because of Junpei's appearance, until Komako helps. Eventually the children and Junpei get to Tokyo and find the aunt, but they decide to run away to find Junpei and Komako, who become a mother and father to the children.

== Cast ==
- Keiju Kobayashi : Junpei
- Hideko Takamine : Komako Kuwata
- Reiko Dan : Aunt
- Norihei Miki : Jirokichi
- Ko Nishimura : Doctor
- Tatsuo Matsumura : Detective
- Bokuzen Hidari
- Kin Sugai
- Etsuko Ichihara
- Asao Sano
