= Takeshi Terauchi =

Japanese rock guitarist (1939–2021)

- Also known as: Terry
- Born: Takeshi Terauchi; 17 January 1939
- Origin: Tsuchiura, Ibaraki Prefecture, Japan
- Died: 18 June 2021 (aged 82)
- Genres: Folk rock; instrumental rock; surf rock
- Occupation: Guitarist
- Years active: 1960–2021
- Label: King Records
- Website: Archived 16 July 2018 at the Wayback Machine

Takeshi Terauchi (寺内タケシ, Terauchi Takeshi; 17 January 1939 – 18 June 2021), also known as Terry, was a Japanese instrumental rock guitarist. His preferred guitar was a black Mosrite with a white pickguard. His guitar sound was characterized by frenetic picking, heavy use of tremolo picking and frequent use of his guitar's vibrato arm.

Terauchi started his career playing rhythm guitar at American military bases with ensembles like the Honshu Cowboys, and the country and Western act "Jimmie Tokita & His Mountain Playboys", which had bassist Chosuke Ikariya. In 1962 he formed his first group, The Blue Jeans, which released a debut album "Surfing" in 1963. In 1966 he left the group, citing exhaustion, and missed opening for the Beatles during their tour. In December 1966 he formed a new band, "The Bunnys", and released "Lets Go Terry!".

In May 1967, he also established his own company named "Teraon". He won the "arrangement award" with the song "Let's Go Unmei" at the 9th Japan Record Awards in 1967. He left the Bunnys in 1968. He reformed the Blue Jeans in 1969 and the band was active until 2021.

On November 26, 2008, Takeshi Terauchi and the Blue Jeans released the album Mr. Legend from King Records.

== Discography ==
(not in chronological order)

- Takeshi Terauchi "Nippon Guitars" (1966-1974)
- Takeshi Terauchi And The Bunnys - Lets Go Terry! (1966)
- Takeshi Terauchi And The Bunnys - Let's Go Classics! (1967)
- Takeshi Terauchi - The World Is Waiting For Terry (1967)
- Takeshi Terauchi - Electric Guitar No Subete (All of the Electric Guitar) (1969)
- Takeshi Terauchi And The Bunnys - Seichô Terauchi Bushi
- Takeshi Terauchi & Blue Jeans - Tsugaru Jongara (1974)
- Takeshi Terauchi & The Blue Jeans - Rashomon

== Filmography ==
- Ereki no Wakadaishō (エレキの若大将) (1965)
