= Shōji Ren =

Japanese politician (1887–1960)

- 庄司 廉
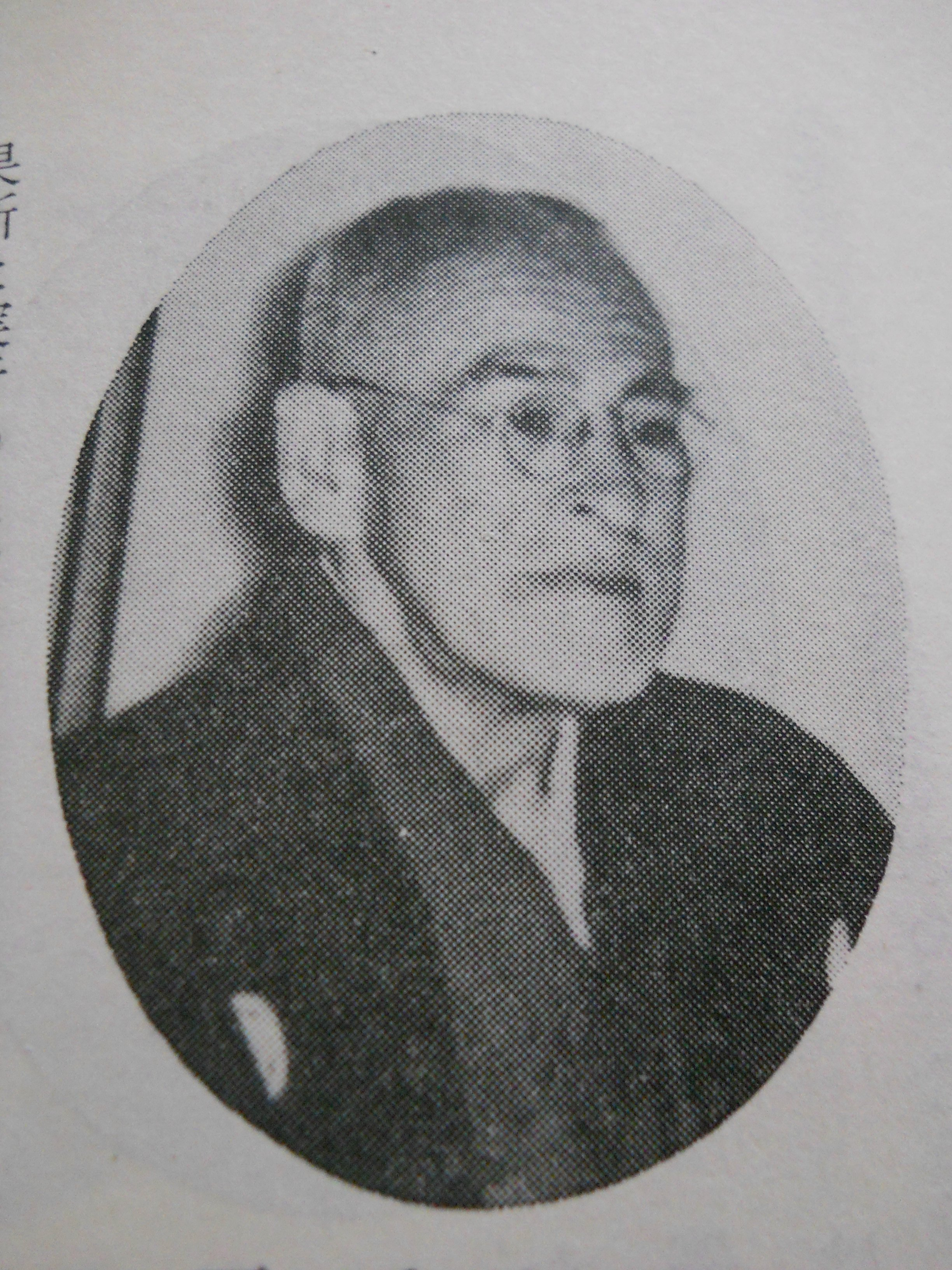

5th Mayor of Watari
- In office October 1915 – December 1918
- Monarch: Taishō

Personal details
- Born: 17 April 1887; Watari, Saihaku, Tottori Prefecture, Japan
- Died: 10 August 1960 (aged 73)

Shōji Ren (庄司 廉, April 17, 1887 - August 10, 1960) was a Japanese businessman, politician, landed magnate and gōnō (wealthy farmer). He served as the 5th Mayor of Watari and director of Yonago Bank. He was commonly known as "Shōji no Tono-sama" ("Lord Shōji"). Actress Yoko Tsukasa is his niece.

== Life ==
Shōji was born on April 17, 1887, in Watari, Saihaku, Tottori Prefecture (present-day Watari, Sakaiminato), the eldest son of gōnō Shōji Shōzō and his wife Yoshi. His mother Yoshi was the eldest daughter of Uyama Seizaemon and the aunt of Governor of Shimane Prefecture Tanabe Chōemon XXIII. He had a younger brother, Hanjirō, who married Yamamoto Ichino, the elder sister of politician Yamamoto Ryō.

When Shōji was eight years old, his father died, and he succeeded his father as the head of the Shōji family. After his father's death, Shōji was raised by Sugiyama Eishin (later Chairman of Saihaku District Council) as his fosterer.

From October 1915 to December 1918, he served as the 5th Mayor of Watari. He was also a member in the Watari Village Council and the Watari Board of Education.

He served as director of Sanin Nichinichi Shimbun, Yonago Bank and Yonago Hakuai Hospital. He was also a landed magnate, and Tanabe Chōemon XXIII, a landed magnate of Okuizumo, was his cousin.

The Tottori Prefecture Hōki Province Detailed List of Land Values and Income Taxes records the total land value of Shōji Ren to have been ¥19,946 (¥400 million = $3.52 million in 2020, adjusted for inflation) in February 1902. Shōji was listed as one of the highest taxpayers in Shimane Prefecture by the Japanese government.

Shōji married Kimura Kiyo, the younger sister of politician Kozaemon Kimura (former Minister of Home Affairs and Minister of Agriculture and Forestry), and the two had six children.

== Episodes ==
In Sakaiminato City History, Shōji, attending the funeral of Emperor Meiji, is described in the following way:

The anecdote that best describes Shōji is that when he attended the funeral of Emperor Meiji as the chairman of the reservists, he was guided to the seats of the kazoku [peerage]. In addition to his clear-cut face and dignified attitude, he wore a haori and walked calmly with a walking stick in his hand, which made him bear the characteristics worthy of being called a lord. The officials of the town office called their visits to the Shōji residence "gotōjō" [attendance at a castle] and they visited the residence in a dignified manner.

Yasuda Mitsuaki (former superintendent of Yonago) wrote about Shōji and his reaction to Yoko Tsukasa's career decision that:

Yōko [Tsukasa] was born to a branch of the Shōji family, the landed magnate of Watari, but the great lord [Shōji Ren] of the main family, a man with the dignity of an old samurai, responded to Mr. Ikebe Ryō's scouting, and to Yōko, who was trying to make the decision to enter the entertainment world, and the branch family that, "I could not show my face to [our] honorable ancestors if the Shōji clan would produce a riverbank beggar [lowly actor]. If you would do this, you will be cut out from the family for a kalpa [forever]," a voice descended from above. Mr. Ikebe Ryō asked to do something about this voice. The grand master of the main Shōji family is called Mr. Shōji Ren, who served several terms on the prefectural board of education and is the father of Mr. Shōji Yasuchika, the current president of Yonago Hakuai Hospital. He was a man of high status and had an appearance just like Marshal-Admiral Tōgō. Mayor Nosaka and him had a mutually respectful relationship, and through this relationship, I also gained a great deal of his trust and patronage.

== Family ==
As for the origins of the Shōji clan, there is a place called Shōji in the center of Watari, and it is presumed that it is related to a medieval manor, however there is not enough evidence to support this. There is also a theory that the clan was originally from Yasugi in Izumo Province, and that the Shōji clan in Watari is a branch of the clan in Yasugi. A branch family of cotton merchants had commuted to the seashore, and finally settled near the seashore in Yumihama, and this is the family that Yasugiya Kōsuke, Shōji Giemon and Yoko Tsukasa came from.

The Shōji family residence retains the typical style of a late Edo period gōnō mansion, and is a valuable building in the architectural history of the region. The main house was destroyed by a large fire in 1832, but was rebuilt the following year, and the main house and tea room are designated as cultural properties of Sakaiminato City. The garden was designated as a place of scenic beauty by the Shimane Prefecture.

Shōji's first son Yasuchika was born in March 1912, and married Kisa Shōko, the eldest daughter of businessman and politician Kisa Tokunosuke (former Mayor of Hirata). Their first daughter Reiko was born in November 1915, and married bureaucrat Wakatsuki Katsuhiko. Their second daughter Kazuko was born in March 1919, their third son Ken was born in January 1921, and their fourth son was named Kuninori. Shōji's uncle Kyūjirō established a branch family with his wife Sonoko.

== See also ==
- Gōnō
- Yoko Tsukasa
- Sakaiminato, Tottori
