= Kunie Tanaka =

Japanese actor (1932–2021)

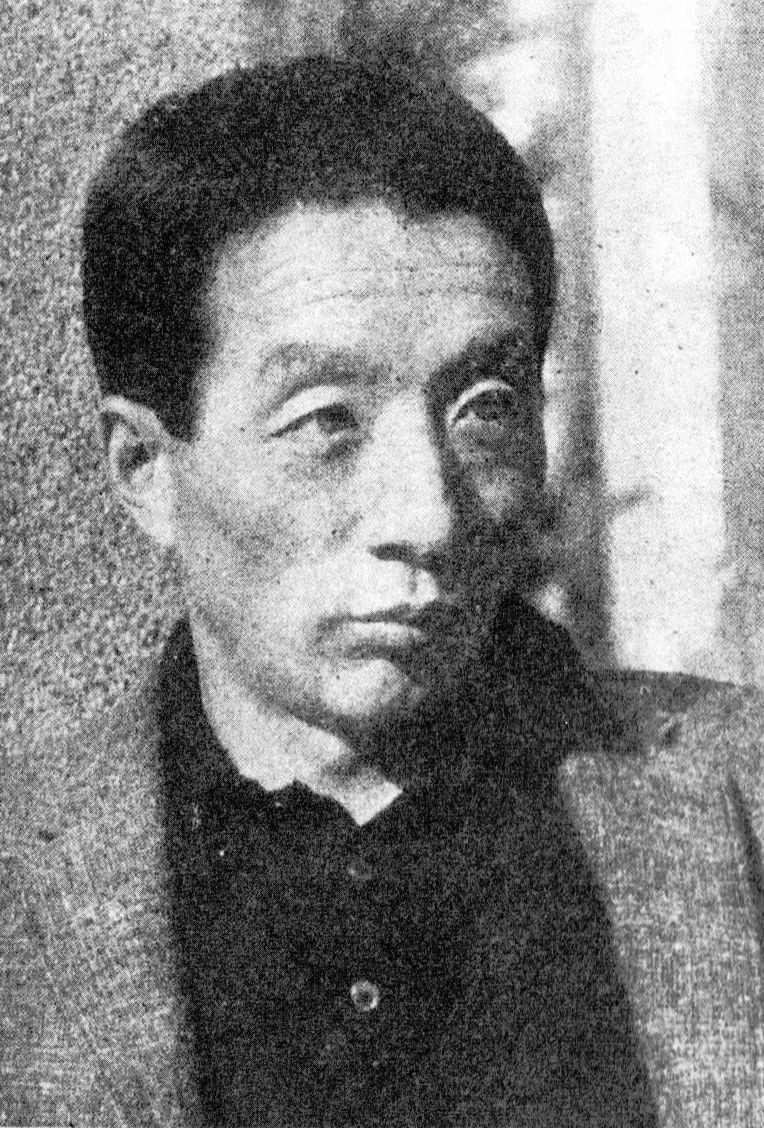
- Born: November 23, 1932; Toki District, Gifu, Empire of Japan
- Died: March 24, 2021 (aged 88); Japan
- Occupation: Actor
- Years active: 1955–2021

Kunie Tanaka (Japanese: 田中 邦衛, Hepburn: Tanaka Kunie; November 23, 1932 – March 24, 2021) was a Japanese actor. Tanaka first made a name for himself as the lecherous antagonist of the Wakadaishō series (1961–1981) of films. He is also well-known for his roles in Kinji Fukasaku's yakuza films, namely the Battles Without Honor and Humanity series (1973–1974), and for starring in the Kita no Kuni Kara (1981–2002) television series.

Tanaka was nominated for five Japanese Academy Awards, winning Best Supporting Actor for Gakko in 1993. He also won the Blue Ribbon Award for Best Supporting Actor for Nogare no Machi and Izakaya Chōji in 1983, and the Blue Ribbon Award for Best Actor for Uhohho Tankentai in 1986. For his contributions to the arts, the Japanese government decorated Tanaka with the Medal with Purple Ribbon in 1999 and the Order of the Rising Sun in 2006.

== Life and career ==
Tanaka was born on November 23, 1932, in Toki District, Gifu to a family of Mino ware potters. After graduating from Reitaku Junior College, he became a substitute teacher in Gifu. However, he gave up the job to become an actor for the Haiyuza Theatre Company.

In 1957, Tanaka had his first film role in Tadashi Imai's Jun'ai Monogatari. His first notable role was as a thug in Akira Kurosawa's The Bad Sleep Well (1960), and he would later work with the director again on Sanjuro (1962) and Dodes'ka-den (1970). He established himself as an actor with the role of lecherous antagonist Shinjiro Ishiyama, nicknamed "Aodaishō", in 1961's Daigaku no Wakadaishō. It spawned the 17-film Wakadaishō series (1961–1981), and he reprised the role for each installment. Tanaka also appeared in Masaki Kobayashi's Kwaidan (1964), and portrayed Daisuke Jigen in Lupin III: Strange Psychokinetic Strategy (1974). He is also known for playing Masakichi Makihara in Kinji Fukasaku's Battles Without Honor and Humanity series (1973–1974) of yakuza films.

Tanaka is well-known for starring as Goro Kuroita in the Kita no Kuni Kara television series, which had various installments between 1981 and 2002. His last film role was in 2010's Saigo no Chushingura.

The character Kizaru, from Eiichiro Oda's manga series One Piece, is modeled after Tanaka.

== Selected filmography ==
- Jun'ai Monogatari (1957)
- The Bad Sleep Well (1960)
- Daigaku no Wakadaishō (1961) as Shinjiro Ishiyama
- Sanjuro (1962)
- Pitfall (1962)
- Brave Records of the Sanada Clan (1963) as Sakazaki Naomori
- Kwaidan (1964)
- Ninpō-chūshingura (1965) as Fuwa Kazuemon
- Abashiri Prison (1965)
- Ereki no Wakadaishō (1965) as Shinjiro Ishiyama
- The Sword of Doom (1966) as Senkichi
- The Threat (1966) as a police officer
- The Human Bullet (1968)
- Fuji Sanchō (1970)
- Dodes'ka-den (1970) as Hatsutaro
- Summer Soldiers (1972)
- Outlaw Killers: Three Mad Dog Brothers (1972)
- Battles Without Honor and Humanity (1973) as Masakichi Makihara
- Battles Without Honor and Humanity: Proxy War (1973) as Masakichi Makihara
- Battles Without Honor and Humanity: Police Tactics (1974) as Masakichi Makihara
- Battles Without Honor and Humanity: Final Episode (1974) as Masakichi Makihara
- Evil of Dracula (1974)
- Lupin III: Strange Psychokinetic Strategy (1974) as Daisuke Jigen
- New Battles Without Honor and Humanity (1974) as Gen Sakagami
- Graveyard of Honor (1975) as Katsuji Ozaki
- Cops vs. Thugs (1975) as Kinpachi Komiya
- Manhunt (1976)
- Dynamite Dondon (1978)
- Pink Lady no Katsudō Daishashin (1978)
- Nihon no Fixer (1979)
- Nichiren (1979)
- Izakaya Choji (1983)
- Okinawan Boys (1983)
- Soushun Monogatari (1985)
- Tokei – Adieu l'hiver (1986)
- Uhohho Tankentai (1986)
- Yojo no Jidai (1988)
- Tasmania Story (1990)
- Luminous Moss (1992)
- Gakko (1993)
- Kozure Ōkami: Sono Chiisaki Te ni (1993)
- Tora-san to the Rescue (1995)
- Minna no Ie (2001)
- Saigo no Chushingura (2010)

== Honors ==
- Mainichi Film Award for Best Actor (1967)
- Blue Ribbon Award for Best Supporting Actor (1983)
- Blue Ribbon Award for Best Actor (1986)
- Japan Academy Film Prize for Outstanding Performance by an Actor in a Supporting Role (1993)
- Medal with Purple Ribbon (1999)
- Order of the Rising Sun, 4th Class, Gold Rays with Rosette (2006)
