= Yuriko Hoshi =

Japanese actress (1943–2018)

- 星 由里子
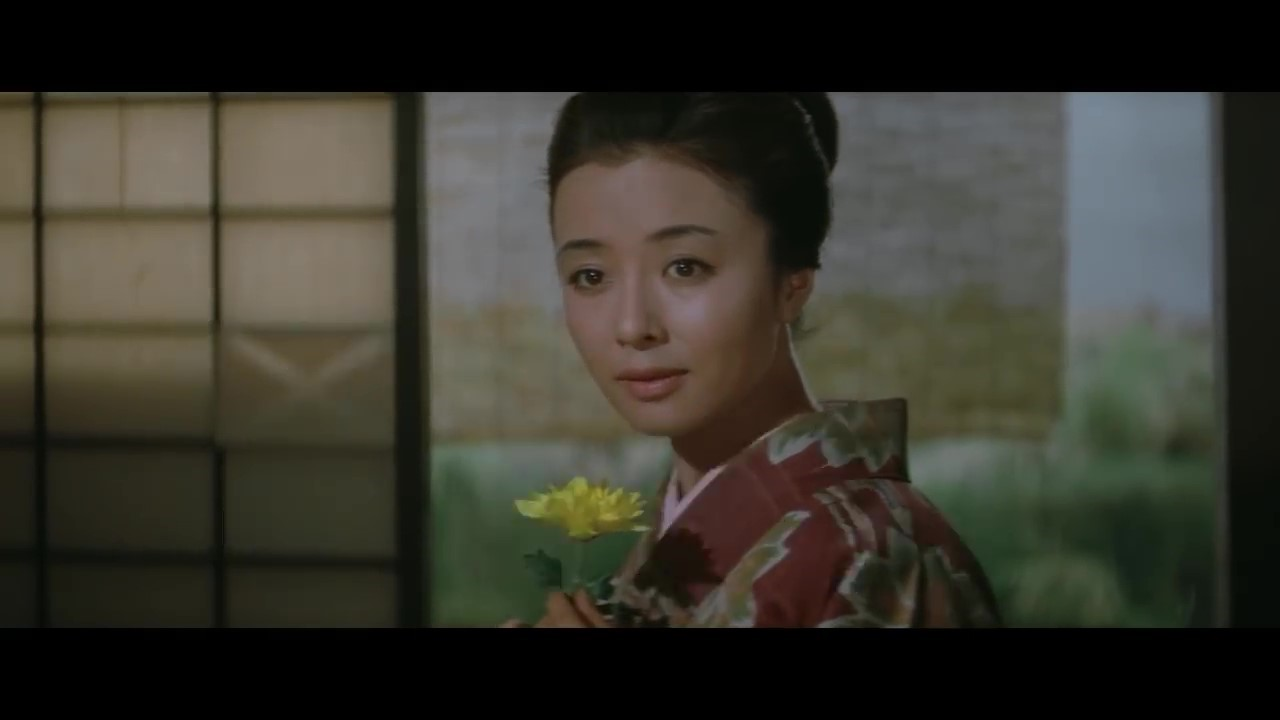
- Born: Yuriko Shimizu (清水 由里子); 6 December 1943; Tokyo, Japan
- Died: 16 May 2018 (aged 74); Kyoto, Japan
- Occupation: Actress
- Years active: 1959–2018

Yuriko Hoshi (星 由里子, Hoshi Yuriko; 6 December 1943 – 16 May 2018), born Yuriko Shimizu (清水 由里子), was a Japanese actress. She appeared in more than 90 films beginning in 1959.

== Career ==
Born in Tokyo but raised in Kobe, Hoshi made her film debut in 1958 at Toho.

Hoshi died in Kyoto, Japan, at age 74.

== Selected filmography ==
=== Film ===
Year	Title	Role	Notes	Ref.
1961	The Last War	Saeko Tamura		
1961	Daigaku no Wakadaishō			
1961	As a Wife, As a Woman			
1962	Chūshingura: Hana no Maki, Yuki no Maki			
1963	Sengoku Yaro			
1964	Mothra vs. Godzilla	Junko Nakanishi		
1964	Ghidorah, the Three-Headed Monster	Naoko Shindo		
1965	Ereki no Wakadaishō			
1968	Kill!			
1970	Fuji sanchō			
1986	Young Girls in Love			
2000	Godzilla vs. Megaguirus	Prof. Yoshino Yoshizawa		
2007	Tsuribaka Nisshi 18: Hama-chan Su-san Seto no Yakusoku			
2018	Wish You Were Here		Chinese film	

=== Television ===
Year	Title	Role	Network	Notes	Ref.
1976	Kaze to Kumo to Niji to	Senko	NHK	Taiga drama	
1997	Aguri	Mitsuyo Mochizuki	NHK	Asadora	
2000–01	Honmamon	Yōko Matsuoka	NHK	Asadora	
2007	AIBOU: Tokyo Detective Duo	Kayoko Shima	TV Asahi	Episode 19, season 5	
2008	Atsuhime	Muraoka	NHK	Taiga drama	
