= Daigaku no Wakadaishō =

- Film poster
- Directed by: Toshio Sugie
- Written by: Ryōzō Kasahara; Yasuo Tanami
- Produced by: Sanezumi Fujimoto
- Starring: Yūzō Kayama; Ichirō Arishima
- Cinematography: Takashi Suzuki
- Music by: Kenjiro Hirose
- Distributed by: Toho
- Release date: July 8, 1961 (Japan)
- Running time: 82 minutes
- Country: Japan
- Language: Japanese

Daigaku no Wakadaishō (Japanese: 大学の若大将), aka Sir Galahad in Campus, is a 1961 Japanese musical comedy romance film starring Yūzō Kayama and directed by Toshio Sugie. It was the first in a series of films about the "Wakadaishō". Yuzo Kayama plays Yuichi Tanuma, ace of the swimming club of Kyonan university, against the rivalry of the lecherous Shinjiro Ishiyama, played by Kunie Tanaka, nicknamed Aodaishō (青大将), the Japanese name of the Japanese rat snake.

== Cast ==
- Yūzō Kayama as Yuichi Tanuma, "Wakadaishō"
- Ichirō Arishima
- Chōko Iida as Grandmother
- Machiko Naka
- Yuriko Hoshi
- Reiko Dan as Kyoko Danno
- Akemi Kita
- Tatsuyoshi Ehara
- Kunie Tanaka as Shinjiro Ishiyama, "Aodaishō"

== Release ==
The film was released on 8 July 1961 in Japan.
