= Warring Clans =

- Film poster
- Directed by: Kihachi Okamoto
- Screenplay by: Kihachi Okamoto; Takeshi Sano; Shinichi Sekizawa
- Produced by: Tomoyuki Tanaka
- Starring: Yūzō Kayama; Makoto Satō; Yuriko Hoshi; Kumi Mizuno
- Cinematography: Yuzuru Aizawa
- Edited by: Yoshitami Kuroiwa
- Music by: Masaru Sato
- Production company: Toho
- Distributed by: Toho
- Release date: 24 March 1963 (Japan)
- Running time: 97 minutes
- Country: Japan

Warring Clans (Japanese: 戦国野郎, Hepburn: Sengoku Yarō) is a 1963 Japanese samurai film directed by Kihachi Okamoto with a screenplay by Okamoto, Takeshi Sano and Shinichi Sekizawa. The film is about a disenchanted samurai who resorts to smuggling weapons for a rival army.

Japanese cinema specialist David Desser called the film "eccentric".

== Plot ==
A lone masterless warrior with some new friends helps ship 300 rifles to a Japanese warlord during the Sengoku period.

== Cast ==
- Yūzō Kayama as Ochi
- Makoto Satō as Kinoshita Tokichiro
- Yuriko Hoshi as Sagiri
- Kumi Mizuno as Lady Taki
- Hiroshi Hasegawa as Hachisuka Koroku
- Jun Tazaki as Ariyoshi Sosuke
- Ichirō Nakatani as Doshi Harima

== Release ==
Warring Clans was distributed by Toho in Japan on March 24, 1963. It was distributed with English-language subtitles by Toho International in the United States on July 19, 1963. An English-dubbed version was also produced.
