= Yoko Tsukasa =

Japanese actress (born 1934)

Yōko Tsukasa
- 司葉子
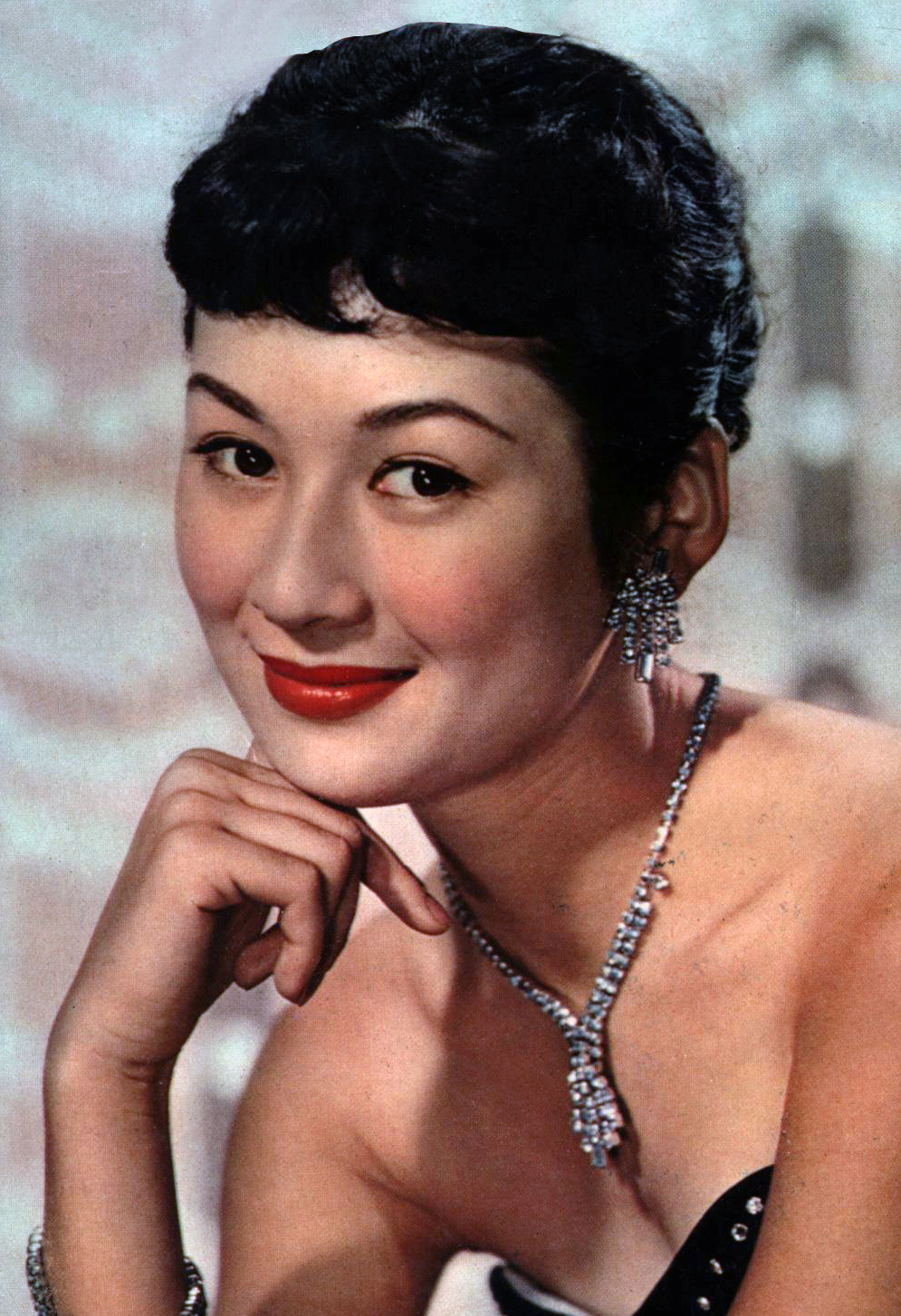
- Tsukasa in 1955
- Born: Yōko Shōji; 20 August 1934 (age 91); Watari-cho, Sakaiminato, Tottori Prefecture, Japan
- Other name: Yōko Aizawa
- Occupation: Actress
- Years active: 1954–present
- Spouse: Hideyuki Aizawa (m. 1969; died 2019)
- Children: 1

Yōko Tsukasa (司葉子, Tsukasa Yōko; born 20 August 1934) is a Japanese actress. During her sixty-year career, she worked with directors such as Yasujirō Ozu, Mikio Naruse and Akira Kurosawa. For her role in The Kii River (1966) she was awarded the Blue Ribbon Award, Mainichi Film Award and Kinema Junpo Award for Best Actress.

== Life ==
Yōko Tsukasa was born Yōko Shōji (庄司 葉子) in Watari-cho, Sakaiminato, Tottori Prefecture. She is the niece of businessman and politician Shōji Ren.

Tsukasa attended Tottori Prefectural Sakai High School and graduated from Kyoritsu Women's Junior College in 1954. In the same year, she was scouted after appearing on the cover of Katei Yomiuri and signed with the Toho Studios. She had her film debut in Kimi shinitamo koto nakare, replacing Ineko Arima due to illness. She was given her stage name by her co-star Ryō Ikebe, and eventually decided to become an actress against her family's initial opposition. Her most important films include Yasujirō Ozu's Late Autumn (1960) and The End of Summer (1961), Akira Kurosawa's Yojimbo (1961), Noboru Nakamura's The Kii River (1966) and Mikio Naruse's Scattered Clouds (1967).

She married politician and attorney Hideyuki Aizawa (1919–2019) in 1969 and reduced her acting activities after 1971 to care for her family. Their son Hiromitsu married singer and actress Shōko Aida.

Tsukasa was head of the "Nihon Taishō Mura" (Japan Taisho Village) open air museum in Ena, Gifu Prefecture, from 1999 to 2015. In 2021, she was honoured with a memorial hall in Nihon Taishō Mura.

== Selected filmography ==
=== Films ===
- Marital Relations (1955)
- A Holiday in Tokyo (1958)
- Life of an Expert Swordsman (1959)
- The Birth of Japan (1959)
- Late Autumn (1960)
- Yojimbo (1961)
- The End of Summer (1961)
- Chūshingura: Hana no Maki, Yuki no Maki (1962)
- The Kii River (1966)
- Samurai Rebellion (1967)
- Scattered Clouds (1967)
- Admiral Yamamoto (1968)
- Goyokin (1969)
- Shinsengumi: Assassins of Honor (1969)
- Prophecies of Nostradamus (1974)
- Queen Bee (1978)
- Mifune: The Last Samurai (2015)

=== Television ===
- Daichūshingura (1971)
- Haru no Sakamichi (1971), Lady Kasuga
- Ōoku (1983)
- The Women of Osaka Castle (1983), Oichi
- Ohisama (2011)

== Honours ==
- Medal with Purple Ribbon (2003)
- Order of the Rising Sun, 4th Class, Gold Rays with Rosette (2010)
- Japan Academy Chairman's Achievement Award (2020)
