= The Lady of Musashino =

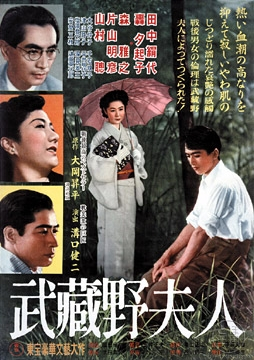
- Original Japanese poster
- Directed by: Kenji Mizoguchi
- Written by: Yoshikata Yoda
- Produced by: Hideo Koi
- Starring: Kinuyo Tanaka
- Cinematography: Masao Tamai
- Edited by: Ryoji Sakato
- Music by: Fumio Hayasaka
- Production company: Toho
- Distributed by: Toho
- Release date: 14 September 1951 (Japan)
- Running time: 92 minutes
- Country: Japan
- Language: Japanese

The Lady of Musashino (武蔵野夫人, Musashino fujin) is a 1951 Japanese drama film directed by Kenji Mizoguchi. It is based on the novel by Shōhei Ōoka.

== Plot ==
Michiko Akiyama is married to Tadao Akiyama, a college professor but a vulgar man with a lower-class background. Towards the end of World War II, they flee the bombing of Tokyo for her parents' estate in the suburban Musashino. Her cousin Eiji Ono, a wartime profiteer with loose morals, and his wife Tomiko live near-by. When her parents die, Michiko inherits the estate. After the end of the war, the extended family is joined by the young and handsome Tsutomu Miyaji, another cousin of hers and former prisoner of war.

Tadao comes home drunk every night, has sexual relationships with students, and also propositions Tomiko. Tomiko, unhappy in her marriage, craves for Tsutomu, as does Michiko. Yet Michiko resists Tsutomu's advances because she is married and does not want him to fall prey to permissiveness. However, when she learns of her husband's plans to swindle her out of her inheritance and run off with Tomiko, she decides to commit suicide to frustrate Tadao's theft, leaving most of her estate to Tsutomu.

== Cast ==
- Kinuyo Tanaka as Michiko Akiyama
- Yukiko Todoroki as Tomiko Ono
- Masayuki Mori as Tadao Akiyama
- Akihito Katayama as Tsutomu Miyaji
- Sō Yamamura as Eiji Ono
- Eitarō Shindō as Shinzaburo Miyaji
- Kiyoko Hirai as Tamiko Miyaji
- Minako Nakamura as Yukiko Ono
- Noriko Sengoku as Maid in the Ono house

== Home media ==
A DVD of the film was released in the UK by Artificial Eye in 2004.
