= Wakadaishō series =

Series of Japanese sports films

The Wakadaishō series is a series of films starring Yūzō Kayama and Kunie Tanaka. The first film in the series was Daigaku no Wakadaishō from 1961.

Masao Kusakari portrayed the role of Wakadaishō in two other films.

All of the films star Kayama as Yuichi Tanuma, nicknamed the Wakadaishō (若大将) meaning "young ace" or "whizz kid" for his prowess in various sports. His perpetual antagonist is the lecherous Shinjiro Ishiyama, played by Kunie Tanaka, who is nicknamed "Aodaishō" (青大将), the Japanese name of the Japanese rat snake.

== Yuzo Kayama as Wakadaishō ==
Title	Title translation	Date of release (Japan)	Featured sports
Daigaku no Wakadaishō	The young ace at university	July 8, 1961	Swimming
Ginza no Wakadaishō	The young ace in Ginza	February 10, 1962	Martial arts
Nihon-ichi no Wakadaishō	Japan's number one young ace	July 14, 1962	Running, water skiing
Hawai no Wakadaishō	The young ace in Hawaii	August 11, 1963	Yacht racing
Umi no Wakadaishō	The young ace at the sea	August 8, 1965	Swimming
Ereki no Wakadaishō	The young electric guitar master	December 19, 1965	American football, horse riding
Arupusu no Wakadaishō	The young ace in the Alps	May 28, 1966	Skiing
Rettsu Go! Wakadaishō	Let's go! Young ace	September 10, 1966	Soccer
Minami Taiheiyō no Wakadaishō	The young ace in the South Pacific	January 1, 1967	Judo, water skiing, scuba diving
Gō! Gō! Wakadaishō	Go! Go! Young ace	December 31, 1967	Rally driving, Ekiden
Rio no Wakadaishō	The young ace in Rio	July 13, 1968	Surfing, fencing
Freshman Wakadaishō	The young ace is a new employee	January 1, 1969	Ice skating
New Zealand no Wakadaishō	The young ace in New Zealand	July 12, 1969	Skiing
Bravo! Wakadaishō	Bravo, young ace!	January 1, 1970	Tennis
Ore no Sora da ze! Wakadaishō	Young ace: the sky's all mine!	August 14, 1970	Skydiving
Wakadaishō Tai Aodaishō	The young ace versus the snake	January 9, 1971	Motorcycling
Kaette Kita Wakadaishō	The return of the young ace	February 11, 1981	New York City Marathon

== Masao Kusakari as Wakadaishō ==
Title	Title translation	Date of release (Japan)	Featured sports
Gambare Wakadaishō		July 12, 1975	
Gekitotsu Wakadaishō		May 29, 1976	
