= Frankie Sakai =

Japanese comedian, actor and musician (1929–1996)

- フランキー堺
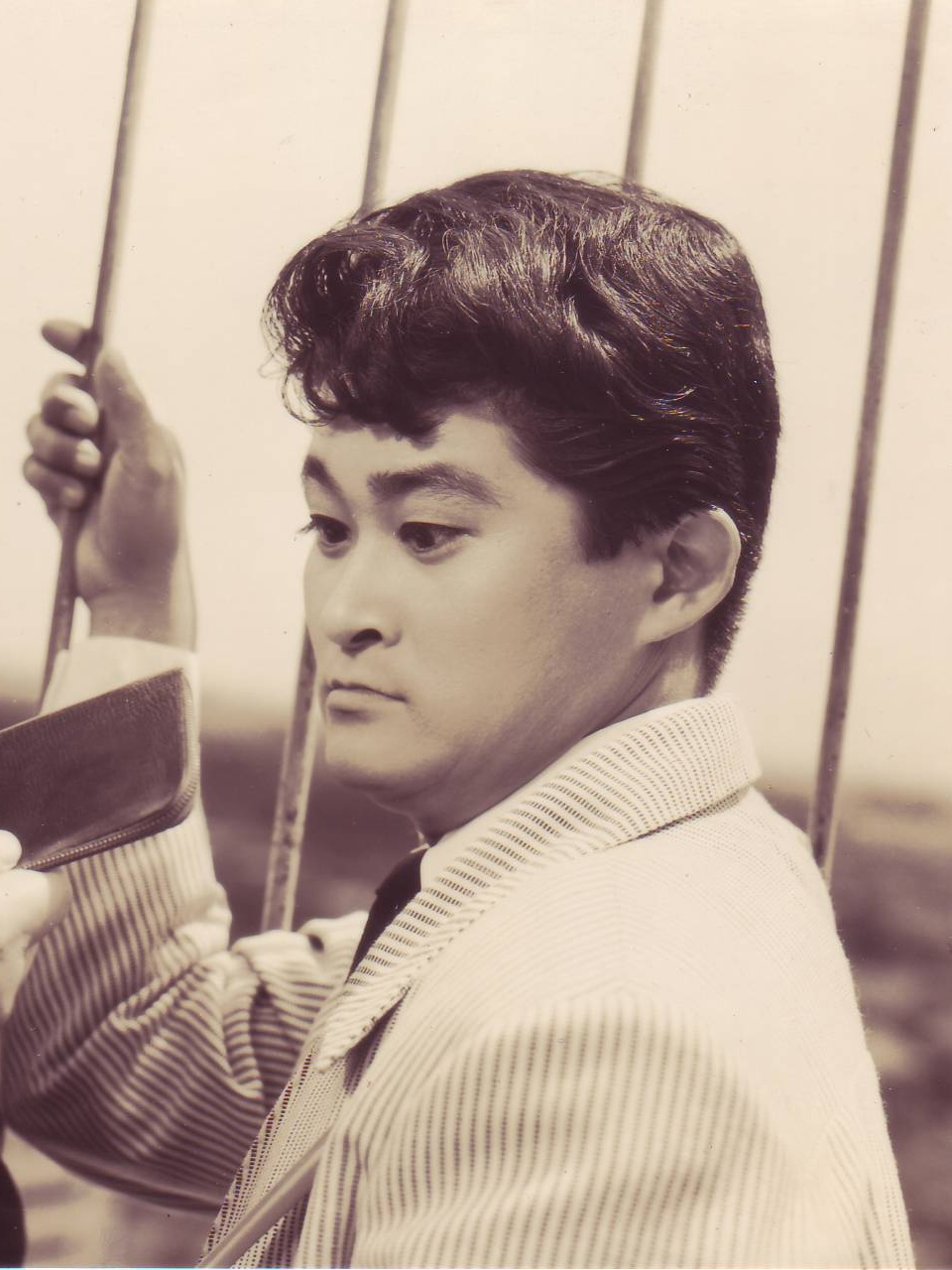
- Frankie Sakai in 1956
- Born: Masatoshi Sakai (堺 正俊, Sakai Masatoshi); 13 February 1929; Kagoshima, Kagoshima, Japan
- Died: 10 June 1996 (aged 67); Japan
- Occupations: Film actor, comedian, musician
- Years active: 1953–1996

Frankie Sakai (フランキー堺, Furankī Sakai) (13 February 1929 – 10 June 1996) was a Japanese comedian, actor, and musician.

== Career ==
From his days at Keio University, Sakai worked as a jazz drummer at American Army camps during the Occupation of Japan, often doing comic routines with his music. Becoming a professional comedian, he appeared in many famous film comedies such as Sun in the Last Days of the Shogunate and the Shachō and Ekimae series at the Toho Studios. He was named best actor at the Blue Ribbon Awards for his work in Sun in the Last Days of the Shogunate and Shiawase wa orera no negai.

He also appeared in musicals such as Kimi mo shusse ga dekiru, serious dramas such as I Want to Be a Shellfish, and kaiju eiga like Mothra. He was also known for his personal study of the ukiyo-e artist Sharaku and helped produce the film Sharaku directed by Masahiro Shinoda. He is best known to American audiences for his dramatic role in the 1980s television production of Shōgun in which he played the part of Lord Yabu.

He died of liver failure on 10 June 1996 at the age of 67.

== Selected filmography ==
=== Films ===
- Seishun jazu musume (1953)
- Musume jûroku jazz matsuri (1954)
- Jazz on Parade 1954 nen: Tokyo Cinderella musume (1954)
- Hatsukoi kanariya musume (1955) - Furakichi
- Ai no onimotsu (1955)
- Jazz on Parade: Jazz musume kampai! (1955) - Fura-san
- Midori haruka ni (緑はるかに; lit. "Beyond the Green") (1955) - Pierrot
- Tokyo baka odori (1956)
- Chika kara kita otoko (1956) - Shimpei Takiguchi
- Zoku ueru tamashii (1956)
- Gyûnyû ya Furankî (1956) - Rukuheita Sakai / Kogorô Sakai
- Tange Sazen: Kenun no maki (1956)
- Otemba san'nin shimai: Odoru taiyô (1957) - Kunio Yamato
- Frankie Bûchan no Aa gunkanki (1957)
- Shiawase wa orera no negai (倖せは俺等のねがい; lit. "Happiness Is Our Wish") (1957) - Gorô Sudô
- Sun in the Last Days of the Shogunate (幕末太陽伝, Bakumatsu Taiyōden; lit. "Records of the Sun in the Last Days of the Shogunate") (1957) - Inokori Saheiji, the stayer
- Sun in the Last Days of the Shogunate (1957) - Inokori Saheiji, the stayer
- Frankie Bûchan no zoku aa gunkaki: Nyogo ga-shima funsenki (1957)
- Man Who Causes a Storm (1957) - Man in jail (uncredited)
- A Boy and Three Mothers (1958) - Seiji, the Farher
- Buttsuke homban (1958) - Tetsuo Matsumoto
- Kigeki ekimae ryokan (1958) - Kinichi Koyama
- Furanki no sannin mae (1958)
- Gurama-to no yuwaku (1959) - Tamenaga
- Aisaiki (1959)
- Moro no Ichimatsu yûrei dochu (1959)
- Abarenbo miri ni Ishimatsu (1959)
- The Bride from Japan (花嫁さんは世界一, Hanayome-san wa Sekaiichi; lit. "Mrs. Bride Is the Number One in the World") (1959)
- I Want to Be a Shellfish (私は貝になりたい, Watashi wa Kai ni Naritai) (1959)
- Kashima ari (1959)
- Shiranami gonin otoko: tenka no ô-dorobô (1960)
- Hito mo arukeba (1960) - Keima Sunagawa
- Yurei Hanjo-ki (1960) - Hachigogo
- Dokuritsu gurentai nishi-e (1960)
- 'Akasaka no shimai' yori: yoru no hada (1960) - Junpei Tanabe
- Â jonan (1960)
- Shima no sehiro no oyabun-shû (1961)
- Tokkyu Nippon (1961) - Kiichi
- Tôkyô yawa (1961) - Ken-chan
- Onna wa nido umareru (1961) - Nozaki
- Mothra (モスラ, Mosura) (1961) - Senichiro 'Sen-chan' Fukuda
- Kigeki: ekimae danchi (1961)
- Minami no shima ni yuki ga furu (1961)
- The Last War (世界大戦争, Sekai Daisensō) lit. "Great World War" (1961) - Mokichi Tamura
- Kigeki ekimae bentô (1961)
- Salary man Shimizu minato (1962) - Kyû Rokkan
- Hagure kigeki mandara (1962)
- Shachô yôkôki (1962)
- Zoku shachô yôkôki (1962)
- Heso no taisho (1962)
- Ao beka monogatari (1962) - Goro
- Kigeki ekimae onsen (1962) - Jirô Sakai
- Shin kitsune to tanuki (1962)
- Chikata nikki (1962)
- Chūshingura: Hana no Maki, Yuki no Maki (1962) - Heigorô
- Kigeki ekimae hanten (1962)
- Kigeki: Detatoko shôbu - 'Chinjarara monogatari' yori (1962) - Nadare no Sabu
- Shachô manyûki (1963)
- Onna ni tsuyoku naru kufû no kazukazu (1963) - Nobuo Koyama
- Zoku shachô manyûki (1963)
- Shachô gaiyûki (1963) - Willie Tanaka
- Kigeki: Tonkatsu ichidai (1963) - Shinichi Tamaki
- Kawachi udoki-Oiroke hanjoki (1963)
- Zoku shachô gaiyûki (1963)
- Charan boran monogatari (1963)
- Daidokoro taiheiki (1963)
- Kigeki ekimae chagama (1963)
- Todan Goro ichiza (1963)
- Wanpaku tenshi (1963)
- Shachô shinshiroku (1964)
- Kigeki ekimae okami (1964) - Jirô Ban'no
- Misuta jaiantsu (1964)
- Zoku shachô shinshiroku (1964)
- Kigeki: Yôki-na mibôjin (1964) - Ghost / Shunji Ogata / Assistant Professor Kida / Junji Shimamichi / an acupressure therapist / Haruo Taniyama / Middle-aged Man
- Kimi mo shusse ga dekiru (君も出世ができる; lit. "You Can Succeed, Too") (1964) - Zenta Yamakawa
- Kigeki ekimae kaidan (1964)
- Kigeki ekimae ondo (1964)
- Kigeki ekimae tenjin (1964)
- Shachô ninpôchô (1965)
- Kigeki ekimae iin (1965)
- Zoku shachô ninpôchô (1965) - Tsuyoshi Kebanai
- Kigeki ekimae kinyû (1965)
- Rokunin no onna o koroshita otoko (1965)
- Hana no o-Edo no hôkaibô (1965) - Hokaibo
- Kigeki ekimae daigaku (1965)
- Anma taiheiki (1965)
- Shachô gyôjôki (1966)
- Kigeki ekimae benten (1966)
- Zoku shachô gyôjôki (1966) - Tsuyoshi Kebanai
- Kigeki ekimae manga (1966) - Jiro Sakai
- Kigeki ekimae bantô (1966)
- Dark the Mountain Snow (1966) - Jiro
- Kigeki ekimae keiba (1966)
- Shachô senichiya (1967)
- Kigeki ekimae mangan (1967) - Jiro Sakai
- Râmen taishi (1967)
- Kigeki ekimae gakuen (1967)
- Zoku shachô senichiya (1967)
- Kigeki ekimae tanken (1967)
- Kigeki ekimae hyakku-nen (1967)
- Kigeki ekimae kaiun (1968)
- Kigeki ekimae kazan (1968) - Jiro Sakai
- Kawachi fûten zoku (1968) - Fûkichi
- Hakuchû dôdô (1968) - Lawyer Sakashita
- Kigeki: Otto urimasu (1968)
- Dorifutazu desu yo! Totte totte torimakure (1968)
- Kigeki ekimae sanbashi (1969) - Jiro Sakai
- Yotarô senki (1969) - Yotarô Akimoto
- Yosakoi ryoko (1969) - Goichi Hasegawa
- Gyakuten ryoko (1969) - Goichi Hasegawa
- Mastermind (1969) - Captain Yamada
- Shin Yotarô senki (1969) - Yotarô Akimoto
- Gokudô petenshi (1969)
- Chibikko Remi to meiken Capi (1970) - Kapi (voice)
- Kigeki aa gunka (1970)
- Onna kumichô (1970)
- Kigeki Kaiun ryokô (1971)
- Kigeki: Inochi no nedan (1971)
- Kawaii akujo: Koroshi no mae nikuchidzukeo (1972) - Deputy head
- Kigeki kaidan ryokô (1972)
- Love of a Bad Woman-Kiss Before the Killing (1972)
- Kigeki otoko no komoriuta (1972)
- Miyamoto Musashi (1973) - Honiden Matahachi
- Machi no hi (1973) - Cosmetic surgery
- Orenochi wa Taninnochi (1974) - Rokosuke Sawamura
- Miyamoto Musashi II (1974)
- Miyamoto Musashi (1974)
- Kigeki-otoko no ude dameshi (1974)
- Ganbare! Wakadaishô (1975)
- Hana no kô-ni trio: Hatsukoi jidai (1975) - Ippei Yazawa
- Gekitotsu! Wakadaishô (1976)
- Kigeki hyakkuten manten (1976)
- Nihon no jingi (1977)
- Dainamaito don don (1978) - Tokuemon
- Tsubasa wa kokoro ni tsukete (1978) - Nobuo Suzuki
- Hawaian rabu: Kikenna hanemûn (1978) - Frank Ômori
- Vengeance Is Mine (1979) - Inspector Kawai
- Hokusai manga (1981) - Nakajima Ise
- Arashi o yobu otoko (1983) - Raymond
- Kokushi muso (1986) - Isenokami
- Shinran: Path to Purity (親鸞 白い道, Shinran: Shiroi Michi) (1987) - Yorishige Inada
- Ore wa otokoda! kanketsu-hen (1987)
- Aitsu (1991) - Tadashi Ono
- Sono kido o tootte (1993) - Gonemon Tahara
- Kowagaru hitobito (1994) - Man of iron pot, man of water-bus
- Chounouryoku-sha - Michi eno tabibito (1994)
- Sharaku (写楽, Sharaku) (1995) - Tsutaya Jūzaburō
- Shakuhachi (1995)
- Setouchi munraito serenade (1997) - (final film role)

=== Television ===
- Taikōki (1965)
- Shōgun (1980) - Lord Kashigi Yabu, Daimyo of Izu
- Onna Taikōki (1981) - Tokugawa Ieyasu
- Taiheiki (1991) - Nagasaki Enki

== Honours ==
- Medal with Purple Ribbon (1994)
