= Yūzō Kayama =

Japanese musician and actor (born 1937)

- 加山 雄三
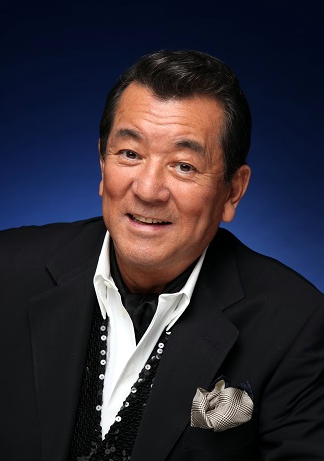
- Kayama in 2021
- Born: April 11, 1937 (age 89); Yokohama, Kanagawa, Japan
- Occupations: Musician, singer-songwriter, actor
- Years active: 1960–2022
- Website: www.kayamayuzo.com

Yūzō Kayama (加山 雄三, Kayama Yūzō; born April 11, 1937) is a Japanese musician, singer-songwriter and actor.

== Life and career ==
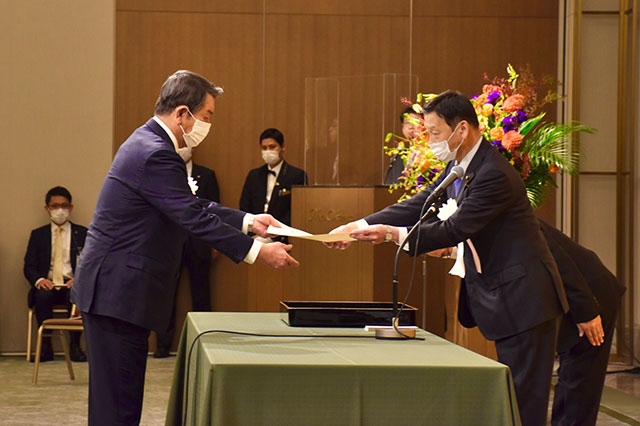
With Shinsuke Suematsu (Award Ceremony for the Persons of Cultural Merit, November 4, 2021)

Son of mid-twentieth century film star Ken Uehara, and actress Yoko Kozakura, (ja) Kayama graduated from Keio University. Yuzo Kayama signed with Toho and made his film debut with Otoko tai Otoko directed by Senkichi Taniguchi in 1960. He was cast in the leading role in the 1960 film Dokuritsu Gurentai Nishie directed by Kihachi Okamoto. Kayama rose to stardom in the 1960s in the Wakadaishō ("Young Guy") film series.

He showed his ability for drama when Akira Kurosawa cast him for his films Sanjuro and Red Beard. In the 1970s, he starred such television dramas as Edo no Kaze and Daitsuiseki.

As a guitarist, he took inspiration from the American instrumental group The Ventures, and performed a form of psychedelic surf music in the 1960s with his Mosrite guitar. One of his best-known instrumentals is "Black Sand Beach". "Kimi to Itsumademo" ("Love Forever"), another of his compositions, sold over two million copies, and was awarded a gold disc in 1965. At that point it was the biggest selling disc in the Japanese recording industry's history.

In March 2016, Kayama made a special art piece to commemorate 2,500,000 million downloads for the mobile game Terra Battle, that is featured as the background for the game's title screen.

In 2017, he sang the 2020 Summer Olympic Games theme "Tokyo Gorin Ondo 2020", a modern adaptation of the 1964 Summer Olympic Games song "Tokyo Gorin Ondo" along enka singer Sayuri Ishikawa and rock singer Takehara Pistol (ja).

He announced that, by the end of 2022, he would be retiring from concert activities. One of the last activities involves the song "Sarai" (ja), which he had written together with singer-songwriter Shinji Tanimura. The song was made as theme for the NTV charity program 24-Hr TV, and Kayama announced that 2022's edition of the program would be his last live performance of the song. Following retirement however, Kayama made a surprise appearance at a tribute concert dedicated to him in September 2025, where he reunited with The Yanchers for an encore.

== Filmography ==
=== Films ===
Year	Title	Role	Ref
1960	Otoko tai Otoko	Toshio Masue	
1961	Daigaku no Wakadaishō	Yuichi Tanuma	
1962	Chushingura: Hana no Maki, Yuki no Maki	Asano Naganori	
1962	Ginza no Wakadaishō	Yuichi Tanuma	
1962	Nihon-ichi no Wakadaishō	Yuichi Tanuma	
1962	Sanjuro	Iori Izaka	
1963	Sengoku Yaro	Kittan	
1963	Attack Squadron!	Taki	
1964	Yearning	Koji Morita	
1965	Eleki no Wakadaishō	Yuichi Tanuma	
1965	Red Beard	Dr. Noboru Yasumoto	
1966	The Sword of Doom	Hyoma Utsuki	
1967	Scattered Clouds	Shiro Mishima	
1967	Japan's Longest Day	Morio Tateno	
1968	Admiral Yamamoto	First Lieutenant Ijuin	
1969	Battle of the Japan Sea	Takeo Hirose	
1971	Battle of Okinawa	Higa	
1974	ESPY	Hōjō	
1977	Mount Hakkoda	Captain Kurata	
1995	Thunderbolt	Coach Murakami	

=== Television ===
Year	Title	Role	Ref.
1974–1975	Karei-naru Ichizoku	Teppei Manpyo	
1975–1981	Edo no Kaze	Chiaki Joenosuke	
1978	Daitsuiseki	Eiichi Nitta	
1990	Tobu ga Gotoku	Shimazu Nariakira	
2009	KochiKame: Tokyo Beat Cops	Himself	

== Family tree ==
Iwakura Tomomi
Iwakura Tomosada
Iwakura Tomoaki
Yōko Kozakura	Ken Uehara
Yūzō Kayama	Megumi Matsumoto
Nobuhiro Ikehata	Tetsuo Yamashita	Mayuko Azusa	Emi Ikehata

== Honours ==
- Order of the Rising Sun, 4th Class, Gold Rays with Rosette (2014)
- Person of Cultural Merit (2021)
