= Reiko Dan =

Japanese actress

- Born: March 26, 1935
- Died: November 24, 2003 (aged 68)
- Other names: Reiko Hamada (浜田 令子, Hamada Reiko)
- Occupation: Actress

Reiko Dan (団 令子, Dan Reiko), real name Reiko Hamada (浜田 令子, Hamada Reiko; March 26, 1935 – November 24, 2003), was a Japanese actress. She appeared in multiple films between 1957 and 1974, such as Sanjuro and Red Beard. She retired in 1974, coming back briefly from the late 1980s to 1990 to support her son, Yuta Dan (1967–2006), who was also an actor.

== Early life ==
Reiko Dan was born on 26 March 1935 in Kyoto City, Japan. She would begin acting in 1957 when she was 22. From 1957 and 1974, she would appear in several films such as When a Woman Ascends the Stairs (1960), Yasujirô Ozu's The End of Summer (1961), and Akira Kurosawa's Sanjuro (1962) and Red Beard (1965).

== Partial filmography ==
Beginning from 1957 and 1973, she would appear in 109 films. She is best well known for her roles in When a Woman Ascends the Stairs (1960), Sanjuro (1962), Red Beard (1965), The Age of Assassins (1967), and The Little Adventurer (1973). In 1957, she’d win the Newcomer of the Year award for being one of the many promising newcomers in Japanese film.

Date	Title	Role
1957	Daigaku no Samurai-tachi	Michiko Nakajima
1958	A Holiday in Tokyo	
1958	Song for a Bride	
1958	All About Marriage	Mariko Mutō
1958	Hadaka no Taishō	Female Conductor
1959	Daigaku no Oneechan	Toshiko Sonoe
1959	Monkey Sun	Pon
1959	Three Dolls in Ginza (Ginza no Oneechan)	Ryōko Awa (Punch)
1959	Three Dolls from Hong Kong (Oneechan Makaritōru)	Toshiko Sonoe
1960	When a Woman Ascends the Stairs	Junko Ichihashi
1960	3 Dolls and 3 Guys (Samurai to Oneechan)	Yuriko Dan (Punch)
1960	Haori no Taishō	Harue
1960	Daughters, Wives and a Mother	Haruko Sakanishi
1960	The Dangerous Kiss (Seppun Dorobō)	Mieko Yuki
1960	Oneechan ni Makashi to Ki!	Toshiko Sonoe (Punch)
1960	Gametsui Musume	Kinu Oyamada
1960	Ganbare! Bangaku	Ōji
1960	Oneechan wa Tsui Teru ze	Ryoko Tan
1961	Daigaku no Wakadaishō	Kyoko Danno
1961	The End of Summer	Yuriko
1962	Burari Bura-bura Monogatari	Aunt
1962	Sanjuro	Daughter
1965	Red Beard	O-Sugi
1965	Fort Graveyard	Oharu aka Kin Sun Ho
1965	The Crazy Adventure	Etsuko
1967	The Age of Assassins	Keiko Tsurumaki
1973	Sotsugyô ryokô (The Little Adventurer)	Kiyoko Saito
