= Chūshingura: Hana no Maki, Yuki no Maki =

1962 film

- Japanese film poster
- Directed by: Hiroshi Inagaki
- Screenplay by: Toshio Yasumi
- Based on: Kanadehon Chūshingura by: Izumo Takeda; Senryu Namki; Shoraku Miyoshi
- Produced by: Sanezumi Fujimoto; Tomoyuki Tanaka
- Starring: Matsumoto Kōshirō; Yūzō Kayama; Setsuko Hara; Tatsuya Mihashi; Yoko Tsukasa; Akira Takarada; Reiko Dan; Michiyo Aratama; Keiju Kobayashi; Ryō Ikebe; Frankie Sakai; Toshiro Mifune
- Cinematography: Kazuo Yamada
- Edited by: Hirokazu Iwashita
- Music by: Akira Ifukube
- Production company: Toho
- Distributed by: Toho
- Release date: 3 November 1962 (Japan)
- Running time: 208 minutes
- Country: Japan

Chūshingura: Hana no Maki, Yuki no Maki (忠臣蔵 花の巻 雪の巻, Chushingura: Story of Flower, Story of Snow) is a 1962 Japanese jidaigeki epic film directed by Hiroshi Inagaki, with special effects by Eiji Tsuburaya. Produced and distributed by Toho Studios, it is based on the story of the forty-seven rōnin. The film stars Toshiro Mifune as Genba Tawaraboshi, along with Matsumoto Hakuō I, Yūzō Kayama, Tatsuya Mihashi, Akira Takarada, Yosuke Natsuki, Makoto Satō, Tadao Takashima, and Setsuko Hara in her final film role.

Chūshingura: Hana no Maki, Yuki no Maki was released theatrically in Japan on 3 November 1962. It was released under the title 47 Samurai in the United States.

== Plot ==
The ruling shōgun, Tokugawa Tsunayoshi, appoints Asano Takumi-no-kami Naganori, the daimyō of Akō, as his representative to host envoys from the Imperial Court. He also appoints the protocol official (kōke) Kira Kōzuke-no-suke Yoshinaka to instruct Asano in the intricate ceremonies required of his new position. Asano is young and idealistic and does not understand Kira's expectation that he should be given bribes as compensation for the time spent on their lessons; in his idealistic perspective, such things are a corruption of government and its just operation. When Kira becomes aware of his defiance, he decides to teach his student a lesson in manners and customs by withholding commonly expected courtesies to rebuke him.

The intentional withdrawal of courtesies from him by court officials make Asano emotionally agitated and unstable, yet he cannot bring himself to betray his principles. On the day of the reception, at Edo Castle, Asano finally snaps and draws his short sword when he sees Kira, managing only to scar his head. His reasoning appears to lack all decorum of court, but many purport that an insult may have provoked him. For this act, he is sentenced to commit seppuku. The shogunate confiscates Asano's lands (the Akō Domain) and dismisses the samurai who had served him, making them rōnin. It is also declared that any attempt of revenge against Kira in defense of Asano's honor, as required by bushido, is forbidden.

Kira has spies sent to monitor the former samurai, in particular Asano's faithful chamberlain Ōishi Kuranosuke; he fears that the cunning Ōishi intends to exact revenge regardless of the shogun's orders. However, the spies report that Ōishi, far from planning his vengeance, is now a shadow of his former self: he has divorced his wife, spent all of his money on women and drink, and is regarded by many in Akō as a shameful embarrassment to the samurai. The other rōnin have largely abandoned their fighting ways, taking up work as farmers, merchants, and lowly craftsmen. Kira recalls his spies, believing that he is safe. Once he is sure that no one is watching, Ōishi secretly gathers the former retainers and tasks them with ensuring Kira's death so that Asano's clan may have their honor restored.

The rōnin gather detailed information on the layout of Kira's estate, the number of guards, and the comings and goings of their target. Finally, when Kira and his family are spending the night at home, the plan goes into effect. After making sure that Kira's neighbors know of their intentions and that no one will alert the authorities, Ōishi leads his men to overpower the guards and search the estate until they find Kira. Despite being offered the chance to preserve his honor through suicide, Kira reveals his cowardice by refusing to do so. Ōishi then beheads him, and the rōnin depart. They take the head to a nearby temple and provide gifts to the monks so that they will watch over it until funeral arrangements can be made.

The shogun, learning that both commoners and nobles alike support the rōnin's actions, decides not to have them hanged as criminals. Instead, he allows Ōishi and his followers to die through the act of seppuku. He then declares that Asano's clan has regained their honor, and the surviving members of his family will be allowed to return to their former lands.

== Cast ==
Actor	Role
Matsumoto Hakuō I	Chamberlain Ōishi Kuranosuke
Yūzō Kayama	Lord Asano Naganori
Tatsuya Mihashi	Horibe Yasubei
Akira Takarada	Takada Gunbee
Yosuke Natsuki	Okano Kin'emon
Makoto Satō	Fuwa Kazuemon
Tadao Takashima	Jūjirō Hazama
Toshiro Mifune	Genba Tawaraboshi
Chūsha Ichikawa	Lord Kira Yoshinaka
Akira Kubo	Lord Date
Takashi Shimura	Hyōbu Chisaka
Daisuke Katō	Kichiemon Terasaka
Keiju Kobayashi	Awajinokami Wakisaka
Ryō Ikebe	Chikara Tsuchiya
Minoru Ōki	Tozawa Shimotuke no Kami
Setsuko Hara	Riku
Yoko Tsukasa	Yōzen'in
Reiko Dan	Okaru
Yuriko Hoshi	Otsuya

== Production ==
Film critic and historian Stuart Galbraith IV wrote that the film featured "complex billing" which featured "virtually everyone under contract to [Toho] at this time.". The film was shot in Eastmancolor.

== Release ==
Chushingura was distributed by Toho in Japan on November 3, 1962. The film was Toho's fourth highest-grossing film of 1962 and was the 10th highest-grossing film in Japan that year.

The film was released by Toho International with English subtitles and an English narration by Michael Higgins with a 108-minute running time on October 10, 1963. This version was later cut to 100 minutes for its release in New York. In 1965, the Berkeley Cinema Guild acquired the distribution rights to the film and showed the full version (in two parts), under the title 47 Ronin, at the Cinema Theatre in Berkeley, California for 41 weeks before distributing the film in New York. It was reissued in 1966 with a 207-minute running time in the United States. It was later re-issued by East-West Classics with subtitles at a 208-minute running time.

== See also ==
- List of Japanese films of 1962
- Historical period drama films set in Asia
