= The Last War (film) =

1961 film directed by Shūe Matsubayashi

- Theatrical release poster

Japanese name
- Kanji: 世界大戦争
- Hiragana: せかいだいせんそう
- Katakana: セカイダイセンソウ
Transcriptions
- Revised Hepburn: Sekai Daisensō
- Directed by: Shūe Matsubayashi
- Screenplay by: Takeshi Kimura; Toshio Yasumi
- Produced by: Tomoyuki Tanaka; Sanezumi Fujimoto
- Starring: Frankie Sakai; Akira Takarada; Yuriko Hoshi; Nobuko Otowa; Chishū Ryū; Yumi Shirakawa
- Cinematography: Rokuro Nishigaki
- Edited by: Koichi Iwashita
- Music by: Ikuma Dan
- Production company: Toho
- Distributed by: Toho
- Release date: October 8, 1961 (Japan)
- Running time: 109 minutes
- Country: Japan
- Language: Japanese
- Box office: ¥284.99 million

The Last War (Japanese: 世界大戦争, Hepburn: Sekai Daisensō; lit. 'The Great World War') is a 1961 Japanese epic tokusatsu war disaster film directed by Shūe Matsubayashi, with special effects by Eiji Tsuburaya. It stars Frankie Sakai, Akira Takarada, Yuriko Hoshi, Nobuko Otowa, Chishū Ryū and Yumi Shirakawa. The film portrays a fictional thermonuclear World War III. Produced and distributed by Toho, it was the studio's second highest-grossing film in Japan that year.

== Plot ==
Mokichi Tamura works as a driver for a Tokyo press center, hoping for happiness for his family. His daughter, Saeko, is in love with a merchant, Takano, who has been at sea for a long time. When he returns, the young couple agrees to get married with the consent of Saeko's father.

Meanwhile, tensions between the Federation and the Alliance (fictional stand-ins for the United States/NATO and the USSR/Warsaw Pact, respectively) build, especially after an intelligence-gathering vessel is captured. A new Korean War breaks out across the 38th parallel, with the Federation and Alliance drawn into the war. Tensions reach a critical level; dogfights between Federation and Alliance fighters over the Arctic Ocean (with both sides using nuclear-tipped air-to-air missiles) are just the beginning of a renewed conflict. Two Federation and Alliance ICBMs are nearly launched, though both are halted. Although Japan calls on both sides to seek peace, government officials think that the country could be ripe for Alliance retaliation in light of its open support for the Federation. Soon after an armistice agreement is concluded between North and South Korea, tensions erupt again because of the fighting between the two nations. The efforts of the military to overcome the new war are fruitless.

Five ICBMs are eventually launched from both sides, with targets being major cities around the world; Tokyo, London, Paris, New York and Moscow. The Tamura family stays behind amid the city's panic and holds a final dinner, where an anguished Tamura sobs that he will never see Sakeo marry Takano, or his younger children grow to adulthood. That night, Tokyo is struck by the first of the five ICBMs, which detonates miles above the National Diet Building. Due to the force of the detonation, the city is blown to pieces, producing a mushroom cloud visible from as far away as Mount Fuji. The ground itself is torn open by the blast and magma erupts out of the resultant fissure, incinerating much of what little wreckage is left. Tamura and his family are killed by the detonation over Tokyo as their house is blown away by the detonation's fireball and shockwave. Shortly after Tokyo is destroyed, the remaining four missiles impact Moscow, New York, London and Paris in turn, obliterating each of them. Additional launches (from submarines at sea and/or under the Arctic) are shown, suggesting that either that the destruction of the five cities escalated into a global nuclear war.

The following morning, Takano and his crew change the course of their ship to travel towards Tokyo's ruins, prepared to die en route from their own exposure to the intense radioactive fallout. The vessel's maitre de wonders whether they are the only survivors of humanity. The maitre de and Takano break down as Takano realises that Sakeo is dead and that there is no hope of their own survival. The last shot shows Tokyo, now an immense crater, with the remains of the Diet Building situated near the centre, surrounded by cooled lava flows. Just before the credits, a warning is overlaid on-screen, asking that the events shown never occur in reality.

== Cast ==
- Frankie Sakai as Mokichi Tamura, Tokyo Press Club limousine driver
- Akira Takarada as Takano, sailor on the Kasagi-Maru
- Yuriko Hoshi as Saeko Tamura, Mokichi's daughter
- Nobuko Otowa as Oyoshi Tamura, Mokichi's wife
- Yumi Shirakawa as Sanae, Ebara's daughter
- Chishu Ryu as Ebara, cook on the Kasagi-Maru
- Jerry Ito as Watkins, reporter
- Eijiro Tono as Umehara, Captain of the Kasagi-Maru
- So Yamamura as Prime Minister Masaki
- Ken Uehara as Minister of Foreign Affairs
- Seizaburo Kawazu as Minister of Defense Suitani
- Nobuo Nakamura as Chief Cabinet Secretary Fujikawa
- Chieko Nakakita as Oharu
- Shigeki Ishida as Arimura
- Naoko Sakabe as Suzue, Oharu's daughter
- Kozo Nomura as Ishizaki
- Masao Oda as Mr. Mochiya
- Teruko Mita as Izawa, teacher at daycare
- Wataru Omae as Kasagi-Maru officer
- Koji Abe as Ichiro Tamura, Mochiki's son
- Yuko Tominaga as Haru Tamura, Mochiki's daughter
- Harold Conway as Federation Missile Commander
- Howard Larson and Leonard Stanford as Federation Staff Officers
- Ed Keene as Alliance Commander
- Bernard Barre as Alliance Maintenance Officer
- Hank Brown as Federation First Lieutenant
- Hans Horneff as Alliance Missile Base Commander
- Osman Yusuf as Alliance Correspondent
- Haruo Nakajima as Policeman guiding evacuation (uncredited)

== Production ==
The film had been a goal of Toho producer Tomoyuki Tanaka's for some time, using a script by screenwriter Shinobu Hashimoto, featuring the Cold War escalating to World War III from the perspective of an every-man and his family. As work progressed, it was discovered that Toei had produced a similar film, World War III Breaks Out: 41 Hours of Fear (1960) (第三次世界大戦 四十一時間の恐怖, Dai-sanji sekai taisen: Yonju-ichi jikan no kyofu), dealing with identical subject matter. The two companies created their films as a form of competition, with Toho selecting Shue Matsubayashi as director of their film.

City destruction scenes were created using a variety of techniques. Nuclear attacks on Tokyo, New York, Paris, Moscow and London were done by blowing compressed air upwards at an upside-down miniature. These scenes were reused in films such as Prophecies of Nostradamus. Miniature structures such as the Kremlin and Tower Bridge were made of wafers. Tokyo's destruction sequence used molten iron and flammable charcoal to represent the lava flows and burning wreckage.

== Release ==
The Last War was released in Japan on October 8, 1961, where it was distributed by Toho. The film was Toho's second highest-grossing film of 1961 and the ninth highest grossing Japanese film in 1961. The film earned ¥284.9 million domestically.

The English version/dubbing of The Last War has only been released on VHS and is currently the only home video release of the film in the United States. Germany has seen a DVD release in 2008, under the title of Todesstrahlen aus dem Weltraum (Death Rays from Outer Space).
