= The Three Treasures =

- Theatrical release poster
- Directed by: Hiroshi Inagaki
- Screenplay by: Toshio Yasumi; Ryūzō Kikushima
- Based on: Kojiki and Nihon Shoki
- Produced by: Sanezumi Fujimoto; Tomoyuki Tanaka
- Starring: Toshiro Mifune; Yoko Tsukasa; Kōji Tsuruta; Takashi Shimura; Nakamura Ganjirō II; Akira Takarada; Kinuyo Tanaka; Ichiro Arishima; Kyōko Kagawa; Setsuko Hara
- Cinematography: Kazuo Yamada
- Edited by: Kazuji Taira
- Music by: Akira Ifukube
- Production company: Toho
- Distributed by: Toho
- Release date: November 1, 1959 (Japan)
- Running time: 182 minutes
- Country: Japan
- Language: Japanese
- Budget: ¥250 million ($1 million)
- Box office: ¥600 million

The Three Treasures (日本誕生, Nippon Tanjō; lit. 'The Birth of Japan') is a 1959 Japanese epic religious fantasy film directed by Hiroshi Inagaki, with special effects by Eiji Tsuburaya. Produced by Toho as their celebratory thousandth film, it was the most expensive Japanese film produced at the time and is based on the legends Kojiki and Nihon Shoki and the origins of Shinto. The film was the highest-grossing film of 1959 for Toho and the second highest grossing domestic production in Japan for the year.

The film was shown in Japan on November 1, 1959, becoming the highest-grossing Japanese film of 1959 with ¥344.32 million in rentals. It was later released in the United States in December 1960 as The Three Treasures, edited from its original 1982-minute runtime down to only 112 minutes. It was also shown internationally under the title Age of the Gods.

== Plot ==
The Three Treasures retells the story of the Yamato Takeru legend, and features a recounting of the great battle between Susanoo and the legendary dragon Orochi.

== Cast ==
- Toshiro Mifune as Prince Yamato Takeru and Susanoo
- Takashi Shimura as Elder Kumaso
- Kōji Tsuruta as Younger Kumaso
- Nakamura Ganjirō II as Emperor Keikō
- Akira Takarada as Prince Wakatarashi
- Kinuyo Tanaka as Princess Yamato
- Ichiro Arishima as Gods of Yaoyorozu
- Yoko Tsukasa as Princess Oto Tachibana
- Kyōko Kagawa as Princess Miyazu
- Setsuko Hara as Amaterasu
- Misa Uehara as Princess Kushinada

== Production ==
Stuart Galbraith IV described the film as a religious epic in the style of director Cecil B. DeMille that featured "virtually every star and bit player on the Toho lot".

== Release ==
The Three Treasures was distributed theatrically in Japan by Toho on November 1, 1959. The film was Toho's most profitable film of the year and second highest grossing domestic film of 1959. The film was released in the United States by Toho International Company with English-language subtitles on December 20, 1960. This version of the film was cut to 112 minutes.

The film received a Blu-Ray release in Japan on August 20, 2025.
