= Kuninori Kōdō =

Japanese actor (1887-1960)

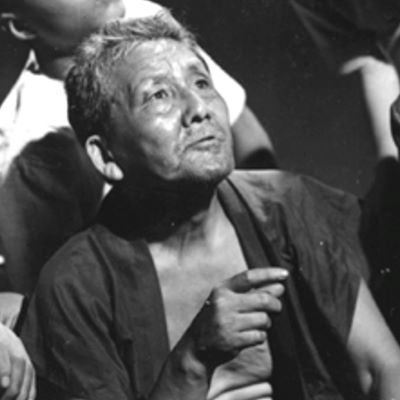
- Kōdō on the set of Godzilla (1954)
- Born: Saichiro Tanigawa; 29 January 1887; Takasago, Hyōgo, Japan
- Died: 22 January 1960 (aged 72)
- Other names: Kokuten Kōdō (高堂 黒天, Kōdō Kokuten)
- Occupation: Actor
- Years active: 1901–1959

Kuninori Kōdō (高堂 国典, Kōdō Kuninori; 29 January 1887 – 22 January 1960), born Saichirō Tanigawa (谷川 佐市郎, Tanigawa Saichirō), was a Japanese film actor. He appeared in more than eighty films from 1923 to 1959.

== Career ==
Kōdō first began acting on the stage in 1901 in shinpa dramas. He joined the Teikine studio in 1923, and after the war, the Toho Studio. He appeared in numerous films by Akira Kurosawa, most notably in Seven Samurai as the village elder.

== Filmography ==
Film
Year	Title	Role	Notes
1923	Itami no yûgure		
1923	Kami wa yurusu ka		
1923	Noroi no fune		
1923	Makiba no kyôdai		
1923	Kyôjo wa utau		
1924	Ashiato		
1924	Kyûteki no ie		
1924	Nikudan		
1924	Shuchû nikki	Rokubei	
1924	Kanojo no unmei		
1924	Hirose chûsa		
1924	Komakine nitôsotsu		
1924	Yama		
1924	Minzoku no chi		
1924	Nekketsu wo hisomete		
1924	Machi no hitobito		
1924	Jogashimâ		
1924	Itsukushi no ame		
1924	Hoshi wa midare tobu		
1924	Fukushûki		
1924	Daitoden		
1925	Komoriuta		
1925	Otomegokoro		
1925	Horaijima		
1925	Yama no ikka		
1925	Shiranui		
1925	Shi no kaibashâ		
1925	Seinen banzai		
1925	Saigo no ippei made		
1925	Koryu yokotawaru		
1925	Kôfuku		
1925	Jusei		
1925	Ingâ no sake		
1925	Daishizen no sakebî		
1925	Biwauta		
1925	Akatsuki		
1925	Aisuru hitobito		
1925	Ai no zouô		
1926	Natsukashi no oka		
1926	Osoroshiki kaikou		
1926	Nichirin: Zenpen		
1926	Jigokukyo yurai		
1927	Dokuro		
1928	Senkan mikasa		
1928	Sanshita yarô		
1928	Sakai tadasuke		
1928	Kizuna		
1928	Ketsurui		
1928	Kagerô		
1929	Issatsu tashôken	Gemba Saburi	
1929	Reigan		
1929	Reigan		
1929	Norainu		
1929	Nikkô no enzô		
1929	Matatabi waraji		
1929	Kokusei dâinchirên		
1929	Koganei Kojirô		
1929	Kami		
1929	Gûen jodo		
1929	Edô jochi banashi		
1929	Ashigaru kenpô		
1930	Hakaranno uta (go)		
1930	Kyoe agattâ taikutsu otoko		
1930	Gorô Masamûne		
1930	Gankubi juryô		
1930	Dâiseisatsû		
1931	Maboroshi-tôge - Edo-hen	Hachirô Amano	
1931	Shimizu Jirochô matatabîhen		
1931	Sendaî ni arâwaretâ taikutsou otoko		
1931	Sandogasa		
1931	Sakata shigêemôn		
1931	Matsuba kanzashi		
1931	Kobo senri wo iku		
1931	Kenkyô tatsumaki		
1931	Jûsanbanmê no doshi		
1931	Haruna no umegako yasûnaka kûsazo		
1931	Edojo shinjû		
1931	Asakusa kuzurê		
1931	Akoroshî ichiban yarî		
1932	Yûreitô		
1932	Sanmangokû		
1933	Yurei gyôretsu		
1933	Teki eno michi		
1933	Tâishigiri no yasâ		
1933	Shunshû amigasabushî		
1933	Mushukû satarô		
1933	Îzayoi cho: zenpen		
1933	Bakuso suru taikutsu otoko		
1933	Akiba no shozo		
1934	Sengoku uzura		
1934	Onshû mitose nikki		
1934	Ôedo shishirokû		
1934	Adauchi tsuchi ningyô		
1935	Tôkai no kaoyaku	Bunzô Nambu	
1935	Haji wo shiru mono		
1935	Goyôuta Nezumi kozô	Shichibei	
1935	Yukinojô henge: Daiippen dainihen		
1935	Ronin taiheiki		
1935	Nakasendo wo yuku taikutsu otoko		
1935	Nakagawa, Nobuo		
1936	Akutarô shishi		
1936	Yukinojô henge, Kanketsu-hen		
1937	Tsukigata Hanpeita	Kunishige Ichimonji	
1937	Yoru no hato	Old man	
1937	Nangoku taiheiki: zenpen	Shôzaemon Chôsho	
1937	Gonza to Sukejû	Rokubei Ôya	
1939	Rônin fubuki	Ikkan Oyamada	
1939	Mukashi no uta	Kôhei	
1939	Byakuran no uta: zenpen: kôhen		
1940	Niizuma kagami	Umeko's uncle	part 1, 2
1940	Tôrazo no kôujinzan		
1940	Zoku Hebihimesama	Jûzô Ichikawa	
1940	Nessa no chikai (Zenpen; Kôhen)	Li Gaofu	
1941	Kawanakajima kassen	Hiryûji Murakami	
1941	Awa no odoriko		
1942	Musashibo Benkei	Kiyomori Tairano	
1942	Midori no daichi	In	
1942	Yâmamâtsurî bôtenkâ		
1943	Sanshiro Sugata	Buddhist Priest	
1945	Sanshiro Sugata Part II	Buddhist Priest Saiduchi	
1945	Tokyo gonin otoko		
1946	No Regrets for Our Youth	Mr. Noge	
1947	Snow Trail	Haruko's Grandfather	
1949	Stray Dog	Old Landlord	
1950	Satsujinsha no kao	Elderly gentleman	
1950	Scandal	Old Man A	
1950	Yoru no hibotan		
1950	Sasaki Kojiro		
1951	Matashirô gyôjôki: Onihime shigure	Shige'emon Otobe	
1951	Waga ya wa tanoshi	Mr. Kanazawa	
1951	Carmen Comes Home	Old man	
1951	The Idiot	Jumpei	
1951	Oriental Evil		
1951	Nanatsu no seiza		
1951	Aoi shinju	Uncle	
1951	Early Summer	Old Uncle	
1952	Sword for Hire		
1952	Sengoku burai		
1952	Yonjû-hachinin me no otoko		
1952	Ringo-en no shōjo		
1953	Fûfu		
1953	Aoiro kakumei		
1953	Akasen kichi	Jusaku Kawanabe	
1954	Seven Samurai	Old Man Gisaku	
1954	Asakusa no yoru	Gosuke	
1954	Godzilla	The Old Fisherman	
1955	Samurai II: Duel at Ichijoji Temple	Old Priest Nikkan	
1955	Half Human	Tribal Chief	
1955	Sugata naki mokugekisha		
1955	Kaki no ki no aru ie		
1955	I Live in Fear	Workers' Older Family Member	
1956	Samurai III: Duel at Ganryu Island	Old Priest Nikkan	
1956	Shin, Heike monogatari: Yoshinaka o meguru sannin no onna		
1956	Niji ikutabi		
1956	Street of Shame	Keisaku Kadowaki	
1956	Godzilla, King of the Monsters!	Old Man on Hill on Oto Island	Uncredited
1956	Gyakushu gokumon toride		
1957	Hadashi no seishun	Suketa Wada	
1957	Throne of Blood	First General	
1957	Godzilla, King of the Monsters!	The Old Fisherman	Uncredited
1957	Untamed		
1957	Dotanba		
1958	Rickshaw Man	Old man	
1958	Kami no taisho		
1958	Hadaka no taishô		
1958	The Hidden Fortress	Old man in front of sign	
1958	Half Human: The Story of the Abominable Snowman	Old Tribe Leader	Uncredited
1959	Ankokugai no kaoyaku		(final film role)
