= Takuan Sōhō =

Japanese Buddhist prelate

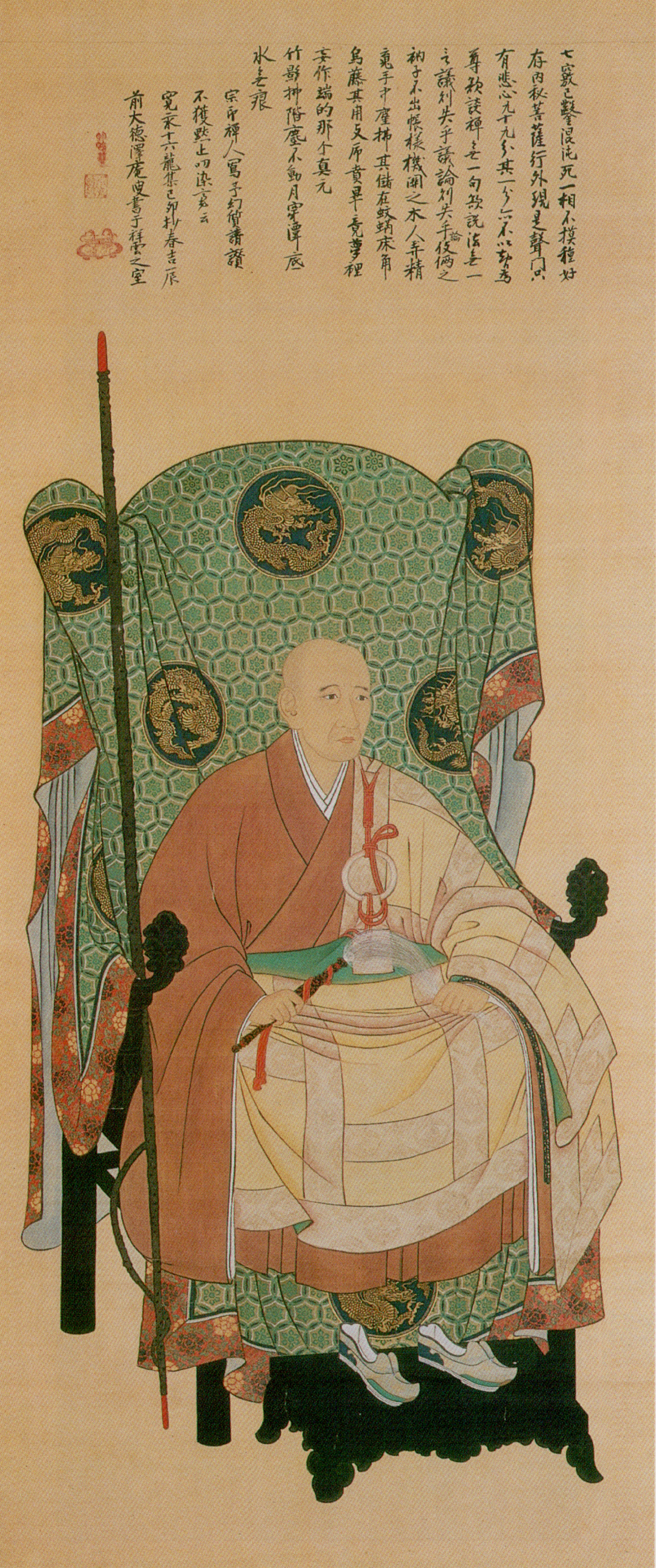
- Portrait of Takuan Sōhō, by Kimura Tokuō, 17th century
- Title: Rōshi

Personal life
- Born: 24 December 1573 Izushi, Tajima Province, Japan
- Died: 27 January 1645 (aged 71) Edo, Japan

Religious life
- Religion: Buddhism
- School: Rinzai

Takuan Sōhō (沢庵 宗彭; December 24, 1573 – January 27, 1645) was a Japanese Buddhist prelate during the Sengoku and early Edo Periods of Japanese history. He was a major figure in the Rinzai school of Zen Buddhism. Noted for his calligraphy, poetry, and tea ceremony, he is also popularly credited with the invention of the takuan pickled radish.

== Biography ==
Takuan Sōhō was born as the second son of Akiba Tsunanori, a samurai and senior retainer of the Yamana clan in the town of Izushi, in Tajima Province (present-day Toyooka, Hyōgo). When he was eight years old, the Yamana clan were defeated by the forces of Oda Nobunaga led by Hashiba Hideyoshi, making his father a ronin. In 1582 Takuan entered the temple of Shōen-ji in Izushi as an acolyte, and in 1586 he was sent to the temple of Sōkyō-ji, also in Izushi, to further studies. In 1591, Maeno Nagayasu, the lord of Izushi Castle during this period, invited Kaoru Sotada a disciple of Daitoku-ji's Shunoku Sōen to administer Sōkyō-ji and Takuan became his disciple. When Kaoru was transferred back to Daitoku-ji in 1594, Takuan accompanied him to Kyoto. There, he studied also directly under Shunoku Sōen at the temple of Sangen-in. In 1599, when Ishida Mitsunari built a memorial temple for his mother in Sawayama Castle, Shunoku and Takuan relocated to Sawayama and remained into the following year. However, after the fall of the castle subsequent to the Battle of Sekigahara and the death of Ishida Mitsunari, Takuan escaped. He was able to recover the body of the executed Ishida Mitsunari and assisted in his funeral services at Sangen-in in Kyoto. After his mentor, Kaoru Sotada died, Takuan relocated to Sakai in Izumi Province. He took the name of "Takuan" in 1604, having used a number of names up until this point as assigned by various of his teachers.

In 1607, Takuan returned to Daitoku-ji and in 1609 was appointed its 154th head abbot. However, he left after only a few days for a prolonged period of traveling, claiming that he neither sought nor wanted the responsibility. Throughout his journeys, Takuan raised and collected funds for the renovation of Daitoku-ji and other Zen temples. In 1620, he returned to his home town of Izushi where the temple of Sukyo-ji had recently been restored by the new daimyo of Izushi Domain, Koide Yoshihide.

Under the Tokugawa shogunate, the government imposed strict regulations on Buddhist temples, and in the case of influential temples such as Daitoku-ji, sought to weaken or break their relationship with the Imperial Court. In the case of Daitoku-ji in particular, it had been tradition that the priesthood was appointed by imperial decree, but now the shogunate declared that such appointments would need to be approved first by the Shogun in Edo. In what later came to be called the "Purple Robe Incident" (紫衣事件, Shie Jiken), in 1627, Emperor Go-Mizunoo awarded the purple robes of priesthood to senior monks at Daitoku-ji. The shogunate promptly declared this action to be illegal and ordered the Kyoto Shoshidai to confiscate the robes. Takuan, together with the senior priesthood of Daitoku-ji and Myōshin-ji protested this action, and were arrested. They were tried for sedition at Edo Castle in front of Shogun Tokugawa Hidetada and Takuan was banished to Kaminoyama in Dewa Province. In 1632, after the death of Hidetada, a general amnesty was proclaimed. Takuan returned to Daitoku-ji and was received in an audience arranged by Yagyū Munenori and Tenkai in Kyoto by Tokugawa Iemitsu, who was very much impressed by Takuan's intelligence and insights. At Iemitsu's invitation, he returned to Edo, where he gave many lectures to Iemitsu, who eventually rescinded the "Purple Robes decree" in 1641, restoring Daitoku-ji to its original honors. In the meantime, Iemitsu had the temple of Tōkai-ji constructed in Shinagawa at the outskirts of Edo in 1639 especially for Takuan, so that he could draw on Takuan's counsel at any time.

Takuan refused to give Dharma transmission, preferring instead to cut off his line. He felt the Dharma was not something which could be passed on, and thus, did not depend on an unbroken transmission from teacher to disciple. His final instructions were, “I have no disciple who has succeeded to my Dharma [i.e., teaching]. After I am dead, if anyone says he is my heir, that person is a Dharma thief. Report him to the authorities and see that he is punished severely!” According to Haskel, Takuan's view was that "Zen mind exists any time a dedicated practitioner experiences realization, with or without a teacher's sanction and support."

Takuan died in Edo in 1645. In the moments before his death, he wrote the kanji for "dream" (夢, yume), and laid down his brush. He also left behind a will stating that a "tombstone must not be built" and that he should be buried without any ceremony in an unmarked grave. His disciples promptly erected gravestones at the temple of Tōkai-ji (東海寺) and also at the temple of Sukyō-ji (宗鏡寺) in Izushi. His grave at Tōkai-ji was proclaimed a National Historic Site in 1926.

== Teachings ==
Takuan taught that the Right Mind, which he also called the Mind of No-Mind, is not placed anywhere, but rather moves about freely in all directions, and "neither congeals nor fixes itself in one place." For Takuan, for the mind to have some place of abiding and stopping is the mind of delusion and the affliction of abiding in ignorance. According to Takuan, the mind that fixes itself in one place is not able to function freely. For instance, Takuan points out that if the mind is placed in just one direction, it will be lacking in nine others. But if the mind is not placed in any one direction, it will be in all ten simultaneously, or as Takuan says, "Put nowhere, it will be everywhere." (Note: Compare with Sengzhao's teaching that the sage is able to know all by not taking individual things as objects of knowledge.)

To illustrate this point, Takuan gives the example of gazing upon a tree. He says if, when looking on a tree, the eye is fixed upon a single leaf, then all the other leaves will be as though they were not present at all. But if the eye is not detained by any one leaf, the entire tree with all its leaves will be taken in simultaneously. He likens this ability to that of Avalokiteśvara's with a thousand arms, for whom all thousand arms are simultaneously useful because Avalokiteśvara's mind is not detained by any one of them.

Takuan appeals to this principle to also critique such practices as placing the mind below the navel in concentration. He says, "...viewed from the highest standpoint of Buddhism, putting the mind just below the navel and not allowing it to wander is a low level of understanding, not a high one. [...] If you consider putting your mind below your navel and not letting it wander, your mind will be taken by the mind that thinks of this plan. You will have no ability to move ahead and will be exceptionally unfree."

Takuan taught that one's mind should not be detained by thoughts, for in that case, though one listens, one will not hear; and though one looks, one will not see. On the other hand, Takuan pointed out that to try to remove one's thoughts is to become preoccupied with the thought of removing them. Instead, he says that if one does not think about it, the mind will remove these thoughts on its own and come to the condition of No-Mind by itself.

== Legacy ==
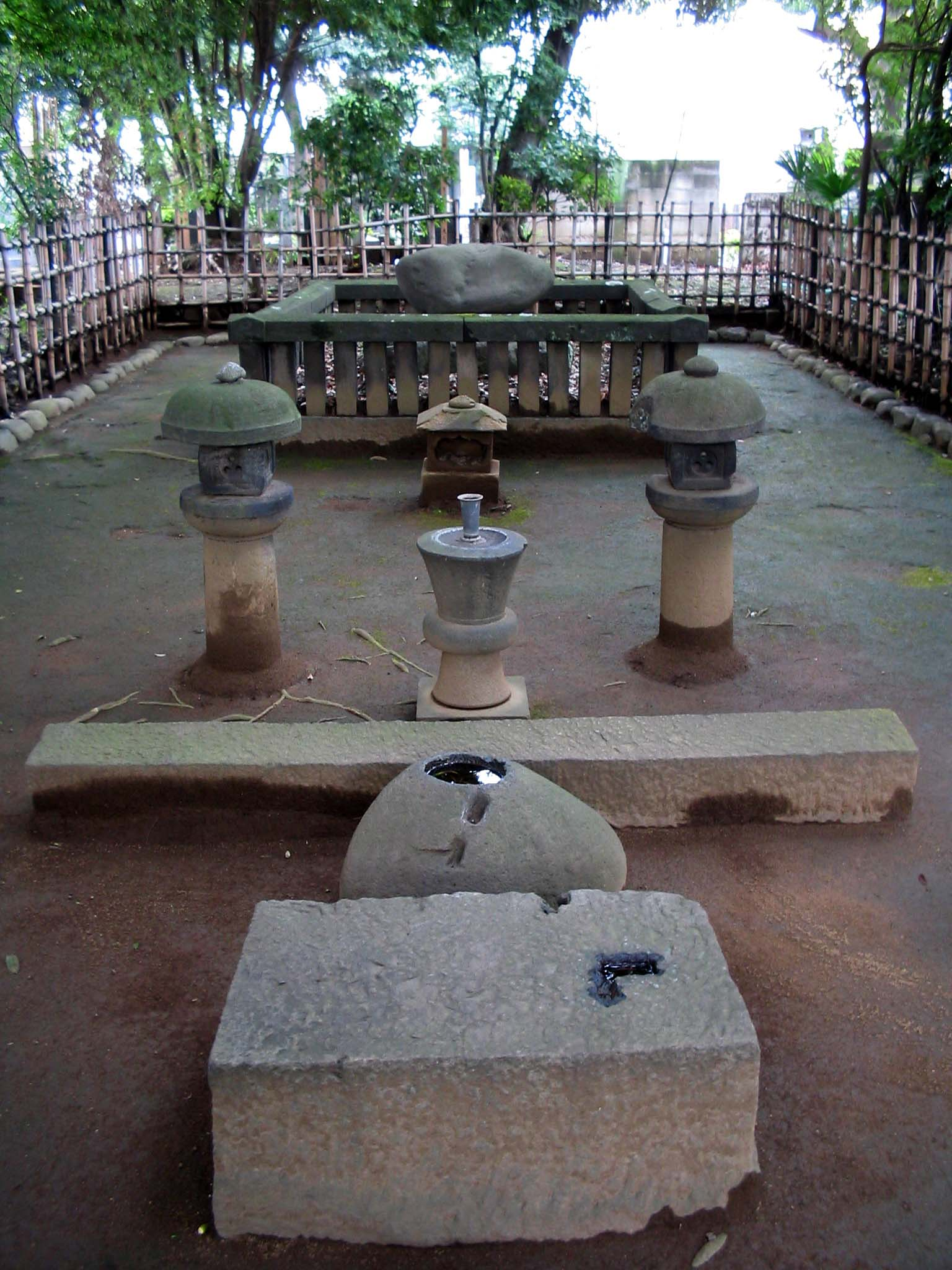
Grave of Takuan at Tōkai-ji

Takuan advised and befriended many people, from all social strata. Some of these included:

- Itō Ittōsai (Kenjutsu master, founder of the Ittō-ryū)
- Mikogami Tenzen (Kenjutsu master, successor of Itō Ittōsai)
- Yagyū Munenori (daimyō and kenjutsu master, head of Yagyū Shinkage-ryū style of swordsmanship) Takuan's writings to Lord Yagyū Munenori and Mikogami Tenzen are commonly studied by contemporary martial artists.
- Ishida Mitsunari (daimyō)
- Kuroda Nagamasa (Christian daimyō)
- Go-Mizunoo (abdicated Japanese Emperor)
- Tokugawa Iemitsu (shōgun)

Takuan remained largely unaffected by his popularity and famed reputation. Known for his acerbic wit and integrity of character, Takuan exerted himself to bring the spirit of Zen Buddhism to many and diverse aspects of Japanese culture, such as Japanese swordsmanship, gardening, sumi-e, shodo, and sado.

His collected writings total six volumes and over 100 published poems, including his best known treatise, The Unfettered Mind. His influence permeates the work of many present-day exponents of Zen Buddhism and martial arts. He has been credited with the invention of the yellow pickled daikon radish that carries the name "takuan".

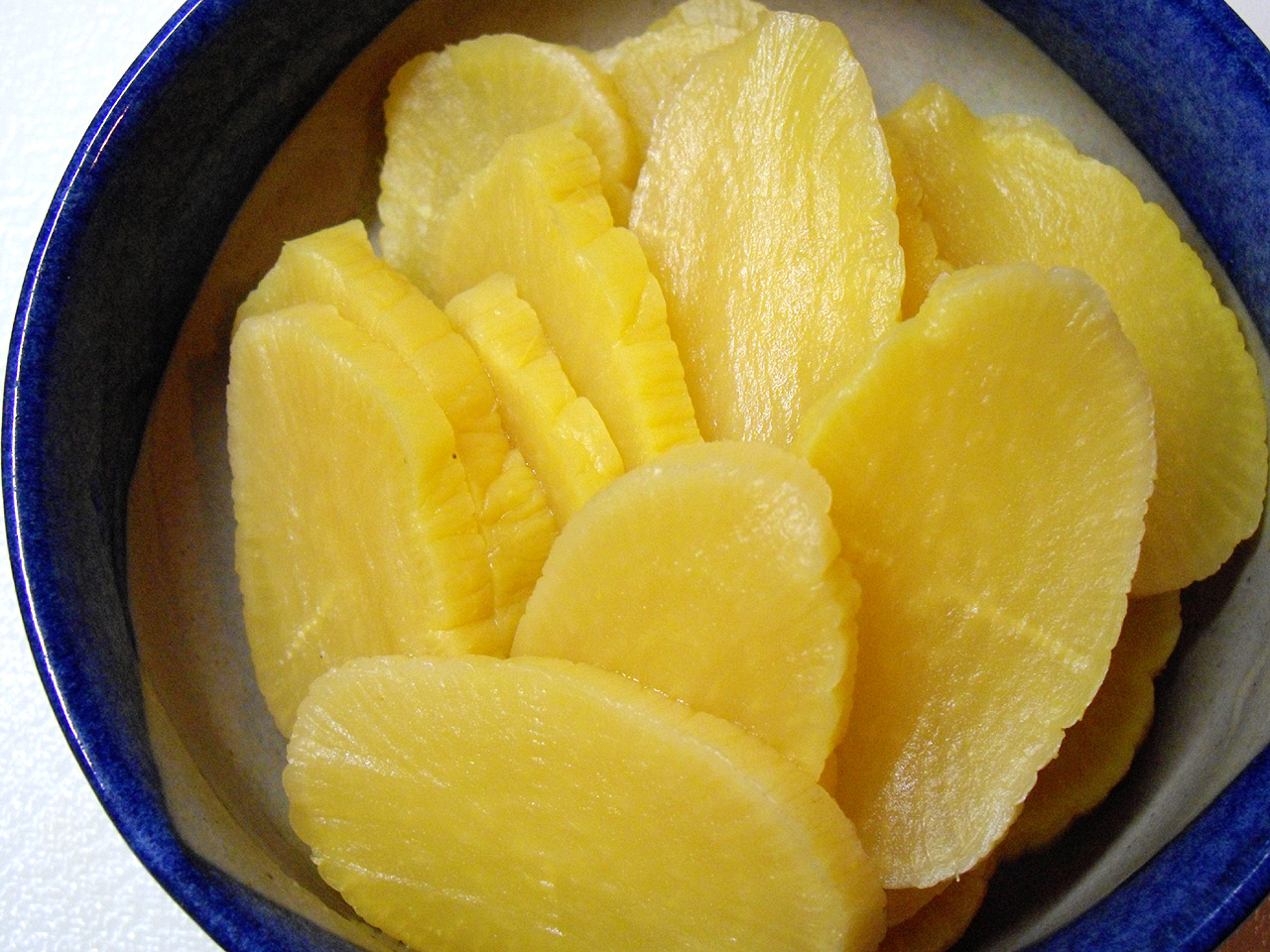
Takuan, a pickled daikon radish dish is named after Takuan

Of the three essays included in The Unfettered Mind, two were letters

- Fudochishinmyoroku, "The Mysterious Record of Immovable Wisdom", written to Yagyū Munenori, head of the Yagyū Shinkage school of swordsmanship and teacher to two generations of shoguns.
- Taiaki, "Annals of the Sword Taia", written perhaps to Munenori or possibly to Ono Tadaaki, head of the Itto school of swordsmanship and an official instructor to the shogun's family and close retainers.

Takuan's morality has become the object of scathing criticism. Brian D. Victoria in "Zen at War" argues that Takuan is among the chief culprits of Zen Buddhism that created a religion unrecognizable as Buddhist. It is because Takuan repeatedly makes reference to the emptiness of opponents who may be murdered without consequence. Victoria understands Takuan to have transgressed the first grave Buddhist precept of 'Do not kill.' This revisionist view is controversial.

== Fictional appearances ==
He is featured as a character in Vagabond, a manga series, which is largely based on Eiji Yoshikawa's equally successful book, Musashi.

Director/writer Yoshiaki Kawajiri in his popular animated film Ninja Scroll created one of main characters Dakuan as a homage to Takuan Soho.

In director Hiroshi Inagaki's Samurai trilogy (Samurai I: Musashi Miyamoto, Samurai II: Duel at Ichijoji Temple and Samurai III: Duel at Ganryu Island), Takuan is played by Kuroemon Onoe and is portrayed as the mentor of Miyamoto Musashi.
