= Life of an Expert Swordsman =

- Directed by: Hiroshi Inagaki
- Written by: Hiroshi Inagaki; Edmond Rostand (play)
- Based on: Cyrano de Bergerac by Edmond Rostand
- Produced by: Tomoyuki Tanaka
- Starring: Toshiro Mifune
- Music by: Akira Ifukube
- Release date: 1959
- Country: Japan
- Language: Japanese

Life of an Expert Swordsman (Japanese: 或る剣豪の生涯, Hepburn: Aru kengo no shōgai) is a 1959 samurai film directed by Hiroshi Inagaki and starring Toshiro Mifune. Its story is an adaptation of the 1897 Edmond Rostand play Cyrano de Bergerac, and its basic plot faithfully follows that of the play. The film was released in the English-speaking world with the title Samurai Saga.

In the film, Mifune plays a samurai named Heihachiro Komaki, who is analogous to the Cyrano character. Yoko Tsukasa plays Komaki's love interest, Princess Chiyo, who is analogous to Cyrano's love interest, Roxane.

At the end of the film, when the mortally wounded Komaki visits Princess Chiyo at her convent to bring her the latest news of the outside world, he mentions the defeat of Kojirō Sasaki in a duel by the famed samurai Musashi Miyamoto. Prior to filming Life of an Expert Swordsman, Mifune had played Miyamoto in Samurai Trilogy, also directed by Inagaki, which chronicled Miyamoto's life, culminating in his legendary duel with Sasaki.

== Cast ==
- Toshiro Mifune as Komaki Heihachiro
- Yoko Tsukasa as Lady Chiyo
- Akira Takarada as Karibe Jurota
- Keiko Awaji as Nanae
- Kamatari Fujiwara as Rakuzo
- Sachio Sakai as Hayashida
- Akihiko Hirata as Akahishi Sakon
- Yoshio Inaba as Shiraishi Genpachi
