= Yosuke Natsuki =

Japanese actor (1936–2018)

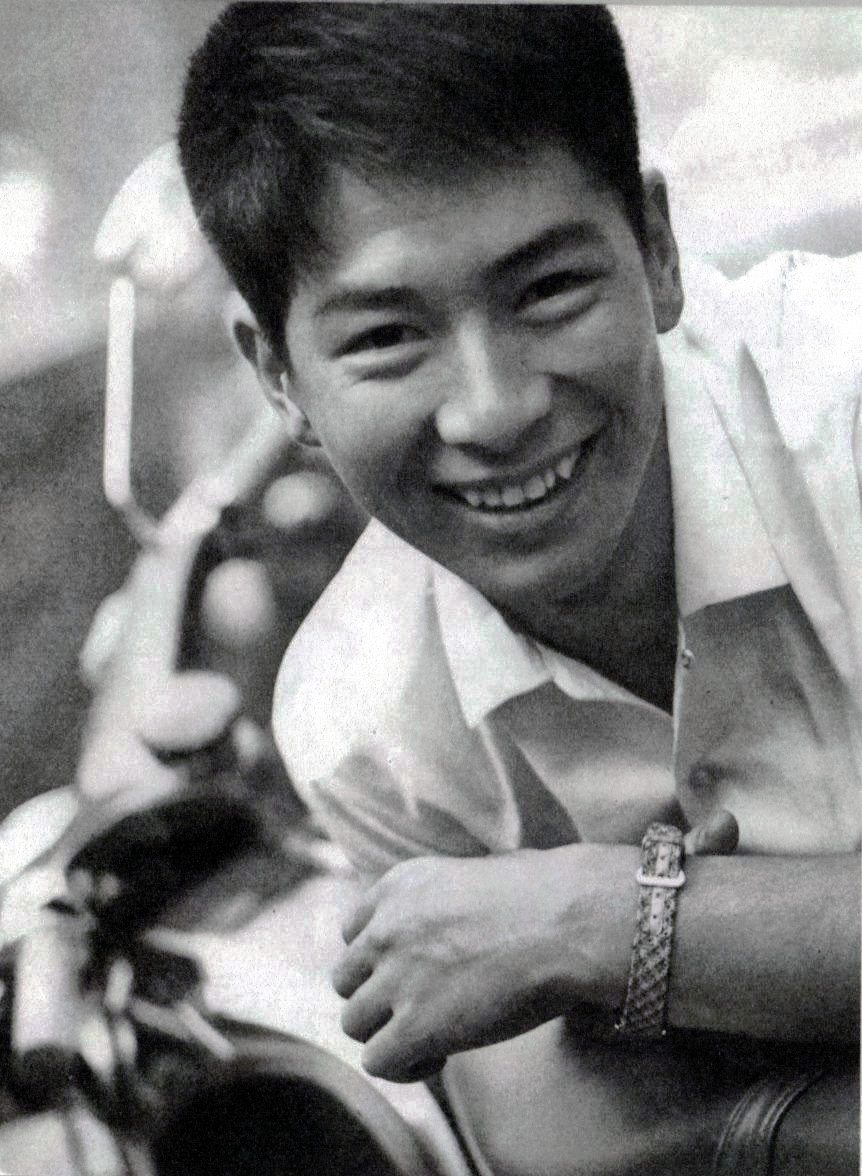
- Yosuke Natsuki in 1958
- Born: February 27, 1936; Tokyo, Japan
- Died: January 14, 2018 (aged 81); Tokyo, Japan
- Occupation: Actor
- Years active: 1958–2018

Yosuke Natsuki (Japanese: 夏木陽介, Hepburn: Natsuki Yōsuke; February 27, 1936 – January 14, 2018) was a Japanese actor. He participated twice in the Dakar Rally as a racing driver.

He did a lot of work for the Toho Company and made his debut in the film The H-Man. He appeared in Akira Kurosawa's Yojimbo in 1961. In the same year, he received the Elan d'or Award for Newcomer of the Year. In the 1970s, he left Toho and joined Toshiro Mifune's production company. He was famous for his role in the police TV drama G-Men '75 as well as Toho Studios monster movies.

== Selected filmography ==
=== Films ===
- The H-Man (1958) - Man, witness on rainy day
- Otona niwa wakaranai: Seishun hakusho (1958)
- Mikkokusha wa dare ka (1958) - Keiichi Sudô
- Ankokugai no kaoyaku (1959) - Kashimura's assistant
- Daigaku no oneechan (1959) - Lucky Nakaki
- Kitsune to tanuki (1959)
- Daigaku no nijuhachin (1959)
- Seishun o kakero (1959) - Hurry Ken
- Wakai koibitotachi (1959) - Tôru Akimoto
- Dokuritsu gurentai (1959)
- Osorubeki hiasobi (1959)
- Bakushô Mito Kômon man'yûki (1959) - Kakunoshin Atsumi
- The Last Gunfight (1960) - Officer Miake
- Samurai to oneechan (1960) - Shôsuke Fuyuki
- Yama no kanata ni - Dai ichi-bu: Ringo no hoo: Dai ni-bu: Sakana no seppun (1960) - Kôichi Shimura
- Kunisada Chûji (1960) - Sentaro Itabashi
- Storm Over the Pacific (1960) - Lt. Koji Kitami
- Fundoshi isha (1960) - Hangoro
- Ôzora no yarôdomo (1960)
- Shin jôdaigaku (1960)
- Autumn Has Already Started (1960) - Shotaro Yamada
- Sararîman Chûshingura (1960) - Riki Oishi
- The Story of Osaka Castle (1961) - Chomonshu Kimura
- Wakai ôkami (1961) - Nobuo Kawamoto
- Minami no kaze to nami (1961) - Junpei Hara
- Zoku sararîman Chûshingura (1961) - Chikara
- Yojimbo (1961) - Kohei's Son
- Dangai no ketto (1961)
- Kurenai no umi (1961)
- Onna bakari no yoru (1961) - Hayakawa
- Gen to fudômyô-ô (1961)
- Yato kaze no naka o hashiru (1961) - Taro
- Hoero datsugokushu (1961)
- Salary man Shimizu minato (1962) - Shingo Oiwake
- Onna no za (1962) - Aoyama Yutaka
- Zoku sararîman shimizu minato (1962)
- Kurenai no sora (1962)
- Dobunezumi sakusen (1962)
- Kigeki ekimae onsen (1962) - Kôtarô Takami
- Chikata nikki (1962)
- Yama-neko sakusen (1962)
- Chūshingura: Hana no Maki, Yuki no Maki (1962) - Kin'emon Okano
- Ankokugai no kiba (1962)
- Attack Squadron! (1963) - Captain Nobuo Ataka
- Chintao yôsai bakugeki meirei (1963)
- Dokuritsu kikanjûtai imada shagekichu (1963)
- Interpol Code 8 (1963) - Akimoto
- Norainu sakusen (1963)
- Warera sarariman (1963)
- Whirlwind (1964) - Kiyonosuke
- Kyô mo ware ôzora ni ari (1964)
- Jigoku sakusen (1964)
- Chi to daiyamondo (1964)
- Dogora (1964) - Inspector Kommei
- Ghidorah, the Three-Headed Monster (1964) - Detective Shindo
- Kokkura suzumaru (1965)
- Kokusai himitsu keisatsu: Kagi no kagi (1965)
- Jinchoge (1966) - Nomura
- Kore ga seishun da! (1966) - Shinsuke Yuki
- Take-chan shacho (1967, part 1, 2)
- Dekkai taiyô (1967)
- Natsukashiki fue ya taiko (1967)
- Moero! Taiyô (1967)
- Moero! Seishun (1968) - Kensuke Sunaga
- Musume zakari (1969) - Takashi Watanabe
- Oiroke komikku (1970)
- Batsugun joshikôsei (1970, part 1, 2) - Shunsuke Takimura
- Circuit no ohkami (1977)
- Bokusâ (1977)
- Kochira Katsushika-ku Kameari kôen mae hashutsujo (1977)
- Jerashî gêmu (1982) - Shinichi Suruga
- Keiji monogatari 3 - Shiosai no uta (1984)
- The Return of Godzilla (1984) - Professor Makoto Hayashida
- Seito shokun! (1984) - Seishi Hokujo
- Godzilla 1985 (1985) - Dr. Hayashida
- Ore wa otokoda! kanketsu-hen (1987)
- Ai wa kurosuoba (1987)
- Umi e, See You (1988)
- Private Lessons II (1993)
- Round 1 (2003)
- Shinario raitâ (star) Matsumoto Mariko no kadai (2005)
- The Passenger (2005) - Naoki Sando
- Sô kamo shirenai (2005)
- Maze (2006)
- Seducing Mr. Perfect (2006) - Mi Jeu-yo-si
- Black Belt (2007) - Eiken Shibahara
- Half Blood Samurai (2008)
- The Monster X Strikes Back/Attack the G8 Summit (2008)
- Sakura Sakura (2010)
- Sayonara natsu yasumi (2010)
- Kirin (2012) - (final film role)
- Mifune: The Last Samurai (2015, Documentary) - Himself

=== Television ===
- G-Men '75 (1975-1979) - Odagiri
- Edo no Gekitou (1979)
- Doberman Deka (1980) - Masamichi Nishiya
- Shōgun (1980) - Zataki
- Tokugawa Ieyasu (1983) - Yagyū Munenori
