= Samurai II: Duel at Ichijoji Temple =

1955 film by Hiroshi Inagaki, Jun Fukuda

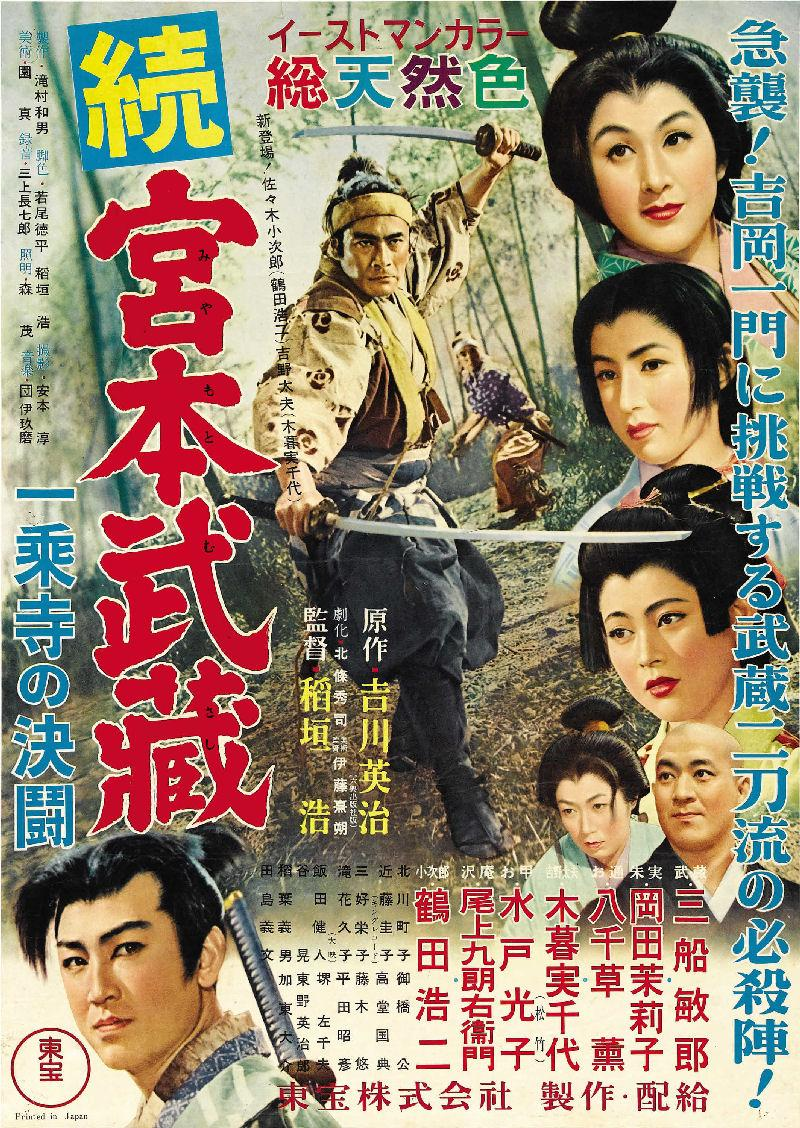
- Theatrical release poster
- Directed by: Hiroshi Inagaki; Jun Fukuda (assistant director)
- Written by: Hiroshi Inagaki; Tokuhei Wakao
- Based on: a novel by Eiji Yoshikawa and a play by Hideji Hōjō.
- Produced by: Toho; Kazuo Takimura (producer); Boku Morimoto (production manager)
- Starring: Toshiro Mifune; Kōji Tsuruta
- Cinematography: Jun Yasumoto
- Edited by: Hideshi Ohi
- Music by: Ikuma Dan
- Production company: Toho Studios
- Distributed by: Toho Studios
- Release dates: 12 July 1955 (Japan); 20 October 1967 (United States)
- Running time: 103 minutes
- Country: Japan
- Language: Japanese

Duel at Ichijoji Temple (Japanese: 続宮本武蔵 一乗寺の決闘, Hepburn: Zoku Miyamoto Musashi: Ichijōji no Kettō) is a 1955 Japanese film directed by Hiroshi Inagaki starring Toshiro Mifune. Shot in Eastmancolor, it is the second film of Inagaki's Samurai Trilogy.

The film is adapted from Eiji Yoshikawa's novel Musashi, originally released as a serial in the Japanese newspaper Asahi Shimbun, between 1935 and 1939. The novel is loosely based on the life of the famous Japanese swordsman, Miyamoto Musashi.

The first part of the trilogy is Samurai I: Musashi Miyamoto (1954) and the third is Samurai III: Duel at Ganryu Island (1956).

The film's production designer was Kisaku Itō, the set decoration was made by Makoto Sono, the consultant of art department was Kisaku Itō, the sound technician was Chōshichirō Mikami, the lighting technician was Shigeru Mori, and the choreographers were Tokuho Azuma and Yoshio Sugino.

== Plot ==
Musashi is walking alone "in search of knowledge and to complete his character as a respectable samurai". He stops by a hut and prepares a bandana on his forehead. There is a boy, Jotaro, waiting nearby. Musashi tells him to go, but he refuses, saying that he lives there and knows Musashi is about to have a duel. Shisido Baiken arrives with two aides. The two men face off, Musashi with his katana, Baiken with rapidly swinging ball and chain and scythe (kusarigama). After a tense battle Musashi delivers a killing thrust. An old man passing by chastises Musashi, commenting that although he is a skilled fencer, he lacks chivalry and is not mentally relaxed, thus is not a true samurai. The boy, Jotaro is an orphan, and follows Musashi on his journey.

In Kyoto, a woman named Otsu is selling fans by the bridge. Another woman, Akemi comes by and notices her sadness, they talk. A warrior, Toji, comes and grabs Akemi to take her back to entertain Seijuro Yoshioka, a wealthy Martial Arts School owner. Toji and Akemi's mother, Oko, discuss how rich they will be after pimping out Akemi.

Meanwhile, at the Yoshioka school, Musashi duels the students, beating them one by one. After, he demands a match with Seijuro, the school master. Later Seijuro arrives to see his wounded students, defeated by someone they consider a back country fencer. Seijuro prepares for a duel but is stopped by Toji, who says Musashi is not good enough for the master. The men whisper and plan. They attack his room en masse but Musashi is gone. He left a note saying Seijuro is to post his time and place for a duel by Sanjo Bridge the next day.

Back at the house, Oko and Toji try to cheer up a pensive Seijuro. Akemi delivers tea. Toji tells him to have his brother Denschichiro fight instead. Akemi sees Musashi's note and his signature, realizing it must be the man she knew as Takezo. She goes to tell a stunned Matahachi, who sets out to find his old friend.

In a shop Musashi is trying to get his sword sharpened, the smithy calls Musashi a murderer and refuses to polish the weapon. The samurai leaves in anger, then pauses, returns and asks humbly, the smithy now agrees but says only the Master Koetsu Honami can polish the sword. At Honami's shop the master polisher is friendly and shows a recent job, a long sword nicknamed "the Clothes Pole". Musashi is interested in the owner, who is Kojiro Sasaki.

In a park Matahachi walks nervously. He sees a group of men attack a samurai, they cry out they made a mistake. The dying man gives Matahachi a package to deliver to Kojiro Sasaki.

At the house Seijuro punishes Akemi for loving his enemy, then he rapes her. Oko and Toji leave them alone. Afterwards, Akemi glares at her mother with hate.

At dusk Musashi waits by the bridge. Otsu arrives by coincidence and the two meet once again - Musashi being the man she was pining for. Suddenly a large group of men approach Musashi. Vastly outnumbered, Musashi fights and retreats, demanding a fair duel. While he escapes by the riverbank, Sasaki crosses the bridge and says that Toji will lose against Musashi. Toji acts bossy until Sasaki suddenly takes his sword and slices off Toji's topknot with the "Swallow Turn" move. Sasaki then strides away back across the bridge.

Otsu runs along the river calling for Takezo. Akemi is there also and hears her. The two women meet and Akemi realizes they both long for the same man. She lies to Otsu, telling her that Takezo had proposed to her. Sadly Akemi says she was going to kill herself but now will live for Takezo. Otsu weeps, not believing it.

Back at the temple she seeks guidance from Takuan the Buddhist priest, and wants to be a nun. Takuan tells her she doesn't have to and introduces her to Jotaro.

Akemi wakens at Sasaki's house. Startled, he tells her she is free to go but asks her to stay awhile. He grills her about Musashi. Toji and his men from Yoshioka school arrives to take Akemi back, but Sasaki threatens them with his long sword. In the resulting clash he strikes two students down. Seijuro stops the fight, saying that he recognizes Sasaki by his fighting style.

At the school Denschichiro comes to see his older brother, berating him for his cowardice in not fighting the previous evening.

All over town the men are looking for Musashi. Finally two men discover where he is and deliver a summons from Denschichiro to duel at nine that night at Rengein Temple.

Denschichiro waits at the temple as Musashi arrives, and they start a swordfight. As a geisha sings, Musashi returns none the worse for wear.

Seijuro sees his dead brother laid out and tells him he shouldn't have been so rash. He tells Sasaki he must now fight Musashi.

Toji has 200 gold pieces and prepares to leave town with Oko, leaving Akemi behind. As the two run out they bump into Matahachi and scurry off. As Matahachi gets up his mother Osugi arrives. He shows his mother the scroll he took from the dying samurai, it is a diploma from the Chujo School and he claims it as his, and he has changed his name to Kojiro Sasaki.

Musashi relaxes by painting at Yoshino's place, but he hears the word on the streets that he's a coward, so he prepares to leave. Leaving the nightclub area, he is quickly surrounded by the people from Yoshioka school. Sasaki intervenes and introduces himself to Musashi. They agree to a duel with Seijuro at five the next morning at Ichijoji Temple, 19 February. The duel is posted for all to read.

Musashi cleanses himself by a well. In the dawn a large group of men confront Sasaki, who claims to be a witness of the duel but is rejected as he is not requested to do so by anybody. Sasaki realizes that they are to ambush Musashi, and leaves after commenting that the house of Yoshioka has no honour.

Osugi has convinced Matahachi to kill Otsu, they intercept her in the woods. Matahachi instead wants to elope, Otsu explains she loves Takezo. Enraged, Matahachi chases her with the long sword. Sasaki happens to come by. Boldly, Matahachi proclaims himself as Sasaki. The real Sasaki is amused and introduces himself.

Musashi stops briefly at a well and ponders the inscription. Akemi arrives and hugs him. Otsu also shows up and sees the two in a close embrace. Akemi tells him there are 80 men waiting for him, she tells him not to go. Otsu watches as Musashi pushes Akemi down and continues towards the duel.

He strides confidently through the bush and arrives behind the ambushers. He decides to go in as promised, demanding to see Seijuro. He draws his blade and starts taking them down. Otsu arrives as more reinforcements also appear, while Sasaki and Akemi watch from a hillside nearby. Since archers land their arrows at Musashi`s feet, he retreats slowly across a rice paddy, the thick mud and water hampers the mob. He gets to dry land first and makes an escape.

As day breaks Takuan appears. Otsu announces she will not be a nun after all.

Somewhere in the woods a tired Musashi meets Seijuro, who claims that he is not a coward but his men stopped him earlier. As they start the duel, Musashi's first strike hurts Seijuro's left arm, causing him falls to the ground and at Musashi's mercy. Recalling the words from the people he encountered previously, Musashi relents and leaves Seijuro alive.

On the run, Musashi is exhausted and collapses at a stream. Jotaro sees him and calls for Otsu. Later, by a mountain stream Musashi awakens. Otsu is happily washing clothes by the water. The two are living their dreams. Overcome with emotion and thinking that Otsu feels the same way for him, Musashi attempts to make love right there, but Otsu tells him she is not ready to go all the way. Confused, Musashi quickly packs his swords and leaves. He then renounces his love of women and promise to never fall for a woman again as they are never clear on their intentions. High above, Sasaki sees him walking alone and wishes him luck in his next grand adventure.

== Cast ==
- Toshiro Mifune as Miyamoto Musashi
- Kōji Tsuruta as Sasaki Kojirō
- Mariko Okada as Akemi
- Kaoru Yachigusa as Otsu
- Michiyo Kogure as Dayū Yoshino
- Mitsuko Mito as Okō, Akemi's mother
- Akihiko Hirata as Seijūrō Yoshioka
- Daisuke Katō as Tōji Gion
- Kurōemon Onoe as priest Takuan (Takuan Sōhō)
- Sachio Sakai as Matahachi Honiden
- Yū Fujiki as Denshichirō Yoshioka
- Machiko Kitagawa as Kogure
- Eiko Miyoshi as Osugi, Matahachi's mother
- Eijirō Tōno as Shishido Baiken
- Kenjin Iida as Jōtarō
- Akira Tani as Kawara-no-Gonroku
- Kō Mihashi as Honami Kōetsu
- Kokuten Kōdō as old priest Nikkan
- Yoshifumi Tajima as Yoshioka samurai
- Keiko Kondō
- Hisako Takihana
- Ren Yamamoto
- Ryū Kuze
- Torahiko Hamada
- Yoshio Inaba
- Fumito Matsuo
- Minoru Itō
- Yasuhisa Tsutsumi
- Ren Imaizumi
- Rinsaku Ogata
- Kenzō Tabu

== See also ==
- Fuju-fuse#The persecution - about the priest Nikkan
