= Samurai I: Musashi Miyamoto =

1954 Japanese film by Hiroshi Inagaki

Musashi Miyamoto
- Theatrical release poster
- Directed by: Hiroshi Inagaki
- Screenplay by: Tokuhei Wakao; Hiroshi Inagaki
- Based on: Musashi, by Eiji Yoshikawa
- Produced by: Kazuo Takimura
- Starring: Toshiro Mifune; Rentarō Mikuni; Kuroemon Onoe
- Cinematography: Jun Yasumoto
- Music by: Ikuma Dan
- Production company: Toho
- Distributed by: Toho
- Release date: 26 September 1954 (Japan)
- Running time: 93 minutes
- Country: Japan
- Language: Japanese

Musashi Miyamoto (Japanese: 宮本武蔵, Hepburn: Miyamoto Musashi) is a 1954 Japanese film directed and co-written by Hiroshi Inagaki and starring Toshiro Mifune. The film is the first film of Inagaki's Samurai Trilogy of historical adventures.

The film is adapted from Eiji Yoshikawa's novel Musashi, originally released as a serial in the Japanese newspaper Asahi Shimbun, between 1935 and 1939. The novel is loosely based on the life of the famous Japanese swordsman Miyamoto Musashi.

The film was followed by Samurai II: Duel at Ichijoji Temple (1955) and Samurai III: Duel at Ganryu Island (1956).

The film won a Special/Honorary Award at the 1955 Academy Awards for outstanding foreign language film.

== Plot ==
Following the battle of Sekigahara, Takezo (Toshiro Mifune) and his friend Matahachi (Rentarō Mikuni) find themselves on the losing side. Instead of the grand victory and glory Takezo had anticipated, he finds himself a hunted fugitive, having to assist a severely injured Matahachi. The pair seek shelter with a widow and her daughter who unknown to them are connected to local brigands. The brigands soon show up and ask for tribute from what the women have stripped off dead samurai, and Takezo has to fight them off. Both women attempt to seduce Takezo but are rejected. The widow then tells Matahachi that Takezo tried to assault her and convinces him to escort her and her daughter to Kyoto. Matahachi agrees even though he loves (and is betrothed to) Otsu (Kaoru Yachigusa), a woman from his village.

Takezo thinks his friend Matahachi has deserted him, and he makes his way home - on the way breaking through a roadblock, injuring several of the local lord's men manning it - and returns to his village. He tells Matahachi's family that he is still alive but will not reveal why Matahachi has not returned. Matahachi's mother does not believe him, and sets a trap for his capture, but he escapes. There is a village-wide search for Takezo, organized by the lord. Even after arresting his relatives to use them as bait, the villagers cannot catch Takezo.

Otsu, meanwhile, gets a letter signed by the widow Oko saying that Matahachi has gone off with her and to forget him, which leaves her devastated. Matahachi's mother, however, continues to insist that Otsu is her daughter-in-law and must live with her.

Takezo is finally captured by the Buddhist priest Takuan Sōhō, who tells the lord that he must be allowed to use his own methods to control him. The priest believes that he can straighten Takezo out, but Takezo again escapes with Otsu's help. Otsu now understands that Takezo was trying to shield her from the knowledge that Matahachi had abandoned her, and begs him to let her travel with him. They flee together but are soon tracked down. Otsu is captured, but Takezo fights his way out. Takezo learns that Otsu has been taken to Himeji Castle and breaks in to rescue her, but is once more tracked down by the priest Takuan. He is tricked and locked in a room in the castle for three years, told to study the ways of the samurai to earn his release while Otsu safely waits for him in a hiding place chosen by Takuan.

The end of the film shows Takezo being released and granted his samurai name 'Musashi Miyamoto'. He then leaves to search for enlightenment, leaving two messages for Otsu: "Soon I will be back" and "Forgive me".

== Historical background ==
The film begins in the year 1600 with Tokugawa Ieyasu's victory in the battle of Sekigahara, which cleared the path to the Shōgunate for Tokugawa Ieyasu; however, it took three more years to consolidate the position of power over the other clans. The historical Miyamoto Musashi is believed to have fought in this battle.

== Cast ==
- Toshiro Mifune as Miyamoto Musashi a.k.a. Takezo
- Rentarō Mikuni as Honiden Matahachi
- Kurōemon Onoe as priest Takuan (Takuan Sōhō)
- Kaoru Yachigusa as Otsu
- Mariko Okada as Akemi
- Mitsuko Mito as Oko
- Eiko Miyoshi as Osugi, Matahachi's mother
- Akihiko Hirata as Seijuro Yoshioka
- Kusuo Abe as Temma Tsujikaze
- Eitaro Ozawa as Terumasa Ikeda
- Akira Tani as Kawarano-Gonroku
- Seijiro Onda as chief official
- Fumito Matsuo as petty official 1
- Masanobu Ôkubo as petty official 2
- Jiro Kumagai as villager 1
- Akira Sera as villager 2
- Yasuhisa Tsutsumi as villager 1
- Yutaka Sada as soldier 1
- Shigeo Kato as soldier 2
- Junichirō Mukai as soldier 3
- Kiyoshi Kamoda as roving warrior 1
- Michio Sakurai as roving warrior 2
- Kyoro Sakurai as roving warrior 3
- Masao Masuda as woodcutter
- Daisuke Katō
- Kanta Kisaragi
- Yoshio Kosugi
- Sōjin Kamiyama
- William Holden as narrator in the original U.S. version (uncredited)

== Production ==
Director Hiroshi Inagaki had done a serial on Musashi Miyamoto in 1941 but prints of it were apparently destroyed due to its feudalistic theme. He also directed Kanketsu Sasaki Kojirô: Ganryû-jima ketto (1951), which had Mifune as Miyamoto. Samurai I: Musashi Miyamoto was the second Toho film production in color and the first in the Eastman Color process.

== Release ==
Samurai I: Musashi Miyamoto was released in Japan on 26 September 1954 where it was distributed by Toho. Championed by William Holden, it was edited and distributed theatrically in the United States as Samurai (The Legend of Musashi) by Fine Art Films with English-subtitles and English narration by Holden on 19 November 1955.

The film was released to home video in Australia and New Zealand by Madman Entertainment as Samurai Musashi Miyamoto.

All three instalments of Samurai Trilogy have been released in a single set by The Criterion Collection.
