= Whirlwind (1964 film) =

- Theatrical release poster
- Directed by: Hiroshi Inagaki
- Screenplay by: Hiroshi Inagaki; Takeshi Kimura
- Produced by: Tomoyuki Tanaka
- Starring: Ichikawa Somegorō VI; Yosuke Natsuki; Makoto Satō; Yuriko Hoshi; Kumi Mizuno; Mitsuko Kusabue; Yoshiko Kuga; Toshiro Mifune
- Cinematography: Kazuo Yamada
- Edited by: Koichi Iwashita
- Music by: Akira Ifukube; Kan Ishii
- Production company: Toho
- Release date: 1964
- Running time: 108 minutes
- Country: Japan
- Language: Japanese

Whirlwind (Japanese: 士魂魔道 大竜巻, Hepburn: Shikonmado Daitatsumaki) is a 1964 Japanese historical drama film directed by Hiroshi Inagaki, with special effects by Eiji Tsuburaya. The film is set during the seventeenth century and is about the aftermath of the Siege of Osaka.

== Plot ==
In the 17th century, after the fall of Osaka to the forces of Shogun Tokugawa Ieyasu, several survivors of the Toyotomi clan try to deliver a young prince to safety. They are betrayed by other survivors who want to enrich themselves under the pretext of re-establishing their clan.

== Cast ==
- Ichikawa Somegorō VI as Jubei
- Yosuke Natsuki as Kyunosuke
- Yuriko Hoshi as Princess Kozato
- Toshiro Mifune as Lord Akashi
- Makoto Satō as the cook
- Akihiko Hirata Ryutaro Inoue
- Kumi Mizuno
- Mitsuko Kusabue
- Yoshiko Kuga
- Yoshio Inaba
- Ryosuke Kagawa
- Sachio Sakai
- Akira Kubo

== Production ==
Director Hiroshi Inagaki and special effects director Eiji Tsuburaya, were both busy with other projects, so they did not discuss from which direction the tornado would appear on the screen, but their directions were the same.
