= Mifune: The Last Samurai =

- Promotional release poster
- Directed by: Steven Okazaki
- Screenplay by: Steven Okazaki; Stuart Galbraith IV
- Produced by: Toshiaki Nakazawa
- Starring: Toshiro Mifune (archival footage); Akira Kurosawa (archival footage); Keanu Reeves (as narrator); Steven Spielberg; Martin Scorsese
- Cinematography: Tohru Hina; Yasuyuki Ishikawa
- Edited by: Steven Okazaki
- Music by: Jeffrey Wood
- Production companies: Creative Associates Limited; Farallon Films
- Distributed by: Strand Releasing
- Release dates: September 7, 2015 (Venice); November 25, 2016
- Running time: 80 minutes
- Country: United States

Mifune: The Last Samurai, also known as Mifune, is a 2015 biographical documentary directed and co-written by Steven Okazaki. It chronicles the life of Toshiro Mifune, a Japanese actor and international star most noted for playing samurai characters in films by Akira Kurosawa.

== Cast ==
- Toshiro Mifune (archival footage) as himself
- Akira Kurosawa (archival footage) as himself
- Kyōko Kagawa as herself
- Yoko Tsukasa as herself
- Yoshio Tsuchiya as himself
- Takeshi Kato as himself
- Kaoru Yachigusa as herself
- Yosuke Natsuki as himself
- Terumi Niki as herself
- Steven Spielberg as himself
- Martin Scorsese as himself
- Shiro Mifune as himself
- Hisao Kurosawa as himself
- Teruyo Nogami as herself
- Tadao Sato as himself
- Sadao Nakajima as himself
- Haruo Nakajima as himself
- Kanzo Uni as himself
- Wataru Akashi as himself
- Kōji Yakusho as himself
- Keanu Reeves as narrator

== Production ==
Mifune was produced by Toshiaki Nakazawa, known for producing 13 Assassins and Sukiyaki Western Django.

=== Writing ===
Mifune is inspired by the book Samurai: Hyōden Mifune Toshirō (Samurai: A Biography of Mifune Toshirō) by Matsuda Michiko.

== Release ==
Mifune officially opened on November 25, 2016 at the IFC Center in New York City, over a year after its premiere at the Venice Film Festival in September 2015.

Its opening coincided with Toshiro Mifune being honored with a posthumous star on the Hollywood Walk of Fame—the ceremony also featured a screening of the film.

=== Home media ===
On April 25, 2017, Netflix began streaming Mifune in the United States on the same day as its DVD release.

== Reception ==
On the review aggregator website Rotten Tomatoes, the film holds an approval rating of 82% based on 34 reviews, with an average rating of 6.5/10.

On Metacritic, the film has a score of 64 out of 100, based on 14 critics, indicating "generally favorable reviews".

== Awards and nominations ==
Venice Film Festival (2015)

- Nominated – Best Documentary on Cinema – Steven Okazaki

Hawaii International Film Festival (2016)

- Nominated – Documentary Feature – Steven Okazaki

Denver International Film Festival (2016)

- Nominated – Best Documentary – Steven Okazaki
