= Yagyu Secret Scrolls =

Yagyu Secret Scrolls Part I 柳生武芸帳 Yagyu Bugeicho
- Japanese movie poster
- Directed by: Hiroshi Inagaki
- Written by: Hiroshi Inagaki; Takeshi Kimura; Kôsuke Gomi (novel)
- Produced by: Tomoyuki Tanaka
- Production company: Toho
- Release date: 14 April 1957 (Japan)
- Running time: 106 minutes
- Country: Japan
- Language: Japanese

Yagyu Secret Scrolls (Japanese: 柳生武芸帳, Hepburn: Yagyu Bugeicho) is a 1957 color Japanese action film, directed by Hiroshi Inagaki. Other English titles include: Yagyu Bugeicho – Ninjitsu part 1, Secret Scrolls, Yagyu Secret Scrolls Part I.

It was followed by a sequel in 1958, Yagyu Secret Scrolls Part II (Japanese: 柳生武芸帳 双龍秘剣, Hepburn: Yagyu Bugeicho – Ninjitsu Part 2).

== Cast ==
- Toshirō Mifune as Tasaburo
- Kōji Tsuruta as Senshiro
- Yoshiko Kuga as Yuhime
- Mariko Okada as Rika
- Denjiro Okochi as Lord Yagyu
- Kyōko Kagawa as Oki
- Senjaku Nakamura as Matajuro
- Hanshiro Iwai as Iyemitsu
- Akihiko Hirata as Tomonori
- Eijirō Tōno as Fugetsusai
- Jotaro Togami as Jubei
- Akio Kobori
- Nobuko Otowa
- Shin Otomo
- Koshiro Matsumoto

Yagyu Secret Scrolls Part II 柳生武芸帳 双龍秘剣 Yagyu Bugeicho – Ninjitsu
- Japanese movie poster
- Directed by: Hiroshi Inagaki
- Written by: Hiroshi Inagaki; Takeshi Kimura; Kôsuke Gomi (novel)
- Produced by: Tomoyuki Tanaka
- Production company: Toho
- Release date: 3 January 1958 (Japan)
- Running time: 105 minutes
- Country: Japan
- Language: Japanese
