= Kaoru Yachigusa =

Japanese actress (1931–2019)

- 八千草 薫
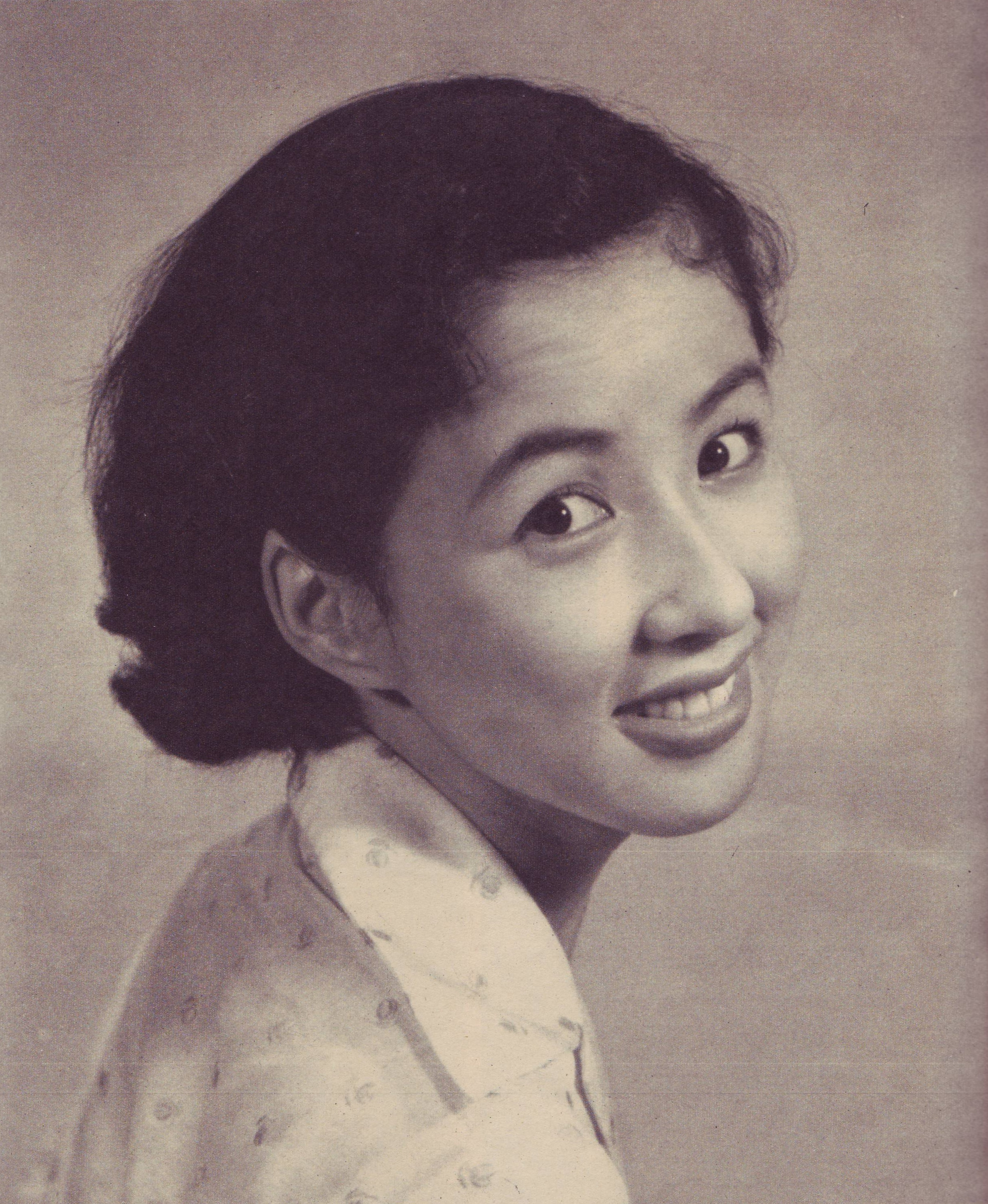
- Yachigusa in 1955
- Born: 6 January 1931; Osaka Prefecture, Japan
- Died: 24 October 2019 (aged 88); Tokyo, Japan
- Occupation: Actress
- Years active: 1947–2019

Kaoru Yachigusa (八千草 薫, Yachigusa Kaoru; 6 January 1931 – 24 October 2019) was a Japanese actress from Osaka Prefecture. From 1947 to 1957, she was a member of the Takarazuka Revue. After leaving the revue, she was active in film, television, and narration.

In 1975, She famously quit part way through the filming of the television series Akai Giwaku, outraged at being forced to work at times dictated by idol Momoe Yamaguchi's schedule.

Her husband, director Senkichi Taniguchi, died on October 29, 2007, in Tokyo, Japan. The couple had been married since 1957.

Yachigusa died on October 24, 2019, at a Tokyo hospital from pancreatic cancer, aged 88.

== Awards and honours ==
- Medal with Purple Ribbon (1997)
- Order of the Rising Sun, 4th Class, Gold Rays with Rosette (2003)
- Mainichi Film Awards: Tanaka Kinuyo Prize (2004)
- Japanese Academy Awards: Best Supporting Actress for her role in Ashura no Gotoku (2004)
- Honorary citizen of Tokyo (2015)

== Filmography ==
=== Film ===
- Madame Butterfly as Cio Cio San (1954), dubbed by an Italian soprano
- Samurai Trilogy as Otsu (1954–1956)
  - Samurai I: Musashi Miyamoto (1954)
  - Samurai II: Duel at Ichijoji Temple (1955)
  - Samurai III: Duel at Ganryu Island (1956)
- Rangiku monogatari (乱菊物語) (1956)
- Ikiteiru Koheiji (1957)
- Snow Country (1957)
- Nuregami kenpo (1958)
- The Human Vapor (Toho, 1960)
- With Beauty and Sorrow (1965)
- Dai Satsujin Orochi - The Betrayal (1966)
- Otoko wa tsurai yo: Torajirō no Yumemakura as the "Madonna" (1972)
- Pastoral: To Die in the Country (1974)
- Blue Christmas (film) (1978)
- Hachiko Monogatari (1987)
- Calling You (2007)
- Dear Doctor (2009)
- The Great Passage (2013)
- Giovanni's Island (2014)
- Mifune: The Last Samurai (2015)

=== Television ===
- Hana no Shōgai (1963) (Taiga drama)
- Zenigata Heiji (Fuji Television, 1966), Oshizu
- Akai Giwaku (episodes 1–6, 1975)
- Ashura no Gotoku (1979,1980)
- The Tale of Genji (TBS, 1980), both Kiritsubo and Fujitsubo
- Dokuganryū Masamune (Taiga drama, NHK, 1987), Nene
- Yanchakure (morning drama, NHK, 1998)
- Tokyo Story (Fuji Television, 2002)
- Arifureta Kiseki (Fuji Television, 2009)
- Kidnap Tour (NHK, 2016)
- Itsuka Kono Koi o Omoidashite Kitto Naite Shimau (Fuji Television, 2016), Shizue Sendō
- Yasuragi no Sato (TV Asahi, 2017), Setsuko
- Honjitsu wa, Ohigara mo Yoku (WOWOW, 2017)
- Yasuragi no Toki Michi (TV Asahi, 2019), Setuko (Her final work)

=== Anime ===
- Agatha Christie's Great Detectives Poirot and Marple as Miss Marple (NHK 2004)
