= Rickshaw Man =

- Japanese movie poster
- Directed by: Hiroshi Inagaki
- Screenplay by: Hiroshi Inagaki; Mansaku Itami
- Story by: Shunsaku Iwashita
- Produced by: Tomoyuki Tanaka
- Starring: Toshiro Mifune; Hideko Takamine
- Cinematography: Kazuo Yamada
- Edited by: Yoshitami Kuroiwa
- Music by: Ikuma Dan
- Release dates: 22 April 1958 (Japan); 3 May 1960 (U.S.)
- Running time: 103 minutes
- Country: Japan
- Language: Japanese

Rickshaw Man (無法松の一生, Muhōmatsu no isshō; "The Life of Wild Matsu"), also released as Muhomatsu, the Rickshaw Man or The Rikisha-Man, is a 1958 color Japanese film directed by Hiroshi Inagaki. It is a remake of his own 1943 film. In the 1943 version Tsumasaburo Bando played the role of Muhōmatsu. In October 2020, a digitally re-mastered 83 minute long version of the original black-and-white film in 4K quality was released in Tokyo at the Tokyo International Film Festival, with a Blu-ray disc going on sale on 26 March 2021.

Set in Japan during the late 19th century up to the early 20th century, it tells the story of Matsugoro, a rickshaw man played by Toshiro Mifune, who becomes a surrogate father to the child of a recently widowed woman played by Hideko Takamine.

== Plot ==
In Kokura, Kyushu, during the early 20th century, Matsugoro (Toshiro Mifune), a poor and illiterate rickshaw puller nicknamed "Wild Matsu" for his hot-tempered nature, returns after a year of banishment. He nurses a head injury from brawling with a passenger revealed as the police kendo master. A policeman visits Matsu at his inn, but the innkeeper hides him; Matsu later recounts the fight humorously. Denied free entry to a kabuki theater—a rickshaw perk—Matsu returns with a friend, buys tickets, and cooks a smelly stew of onions and garlic in the audience, sparking chaos and a fight. An elder mediator explains Matsu's wrong but notes the inconvenience to others; Matsu apologizes deeply to patrons and staff, showing his fairness.

Pulling his rickshaw, Matsu sees boys bullying young Toshio Yoshioka (Kaoru Matsumoto) into climbing a tree. Returning, he finds Toshio injured with a broken leg, abandoned by the others. Matsu carries him home to parents Yoshiko Yoshioka (Hideko Takamine), a gentle educated woman, and Captain Kotaro Yoshioka (Hiroshi Akutagawa), an army officer. Yoshiko asks Matsu to take Toshio to the doctor; he refuses payment, calling it humane. Impressed, Kotaro invites Matsu to dinner. The evening is lively with Matsu singing, but Kotaro falls ill with fever. Matsu fetches the doctor, yet Kotaro dies of pneumonia.

At the funeral, grieving Yoshiko tells Matsu her fear that sensitive, timid Toshio won't grow strong without a father. She asks Matsu to guide him; hesitant, Matsu agrees, becoming a surrogate father. Over years, amid Japan's Russo-Japanese War victory and Siege of Qingdao, Matsu teaches Toshio swimming, fighting bullies, and confidence-building. Once, Matsu halts his rickshaw mid-ride to fix Toshio's tangled kite, ignoring an angry passenger. Matsu quits drinking for a good example but secretly loves Yoshiko. Aware of class barriers—a rickshaw man versus an officer's widow—he hides his feelings, engaging only via Toshio's school events or festivals.

As Toshio matures into a young adult (Kenji Kasahara), he embarrasses at Matsu's "kid" nickname before friends and asks Yoshiko to make Matsu use "Mr. Yoshioka." Hurt, Matsu complies, accepting his outsider role. When Toshio returns as a marriage-eligible bachelor, Matsu visits Yoshiko alone and accidentally confesses his "impure thoughts" for her. Ashamed, he flees, vowing no more contact, resumes drinking, and isolates himself.

At a carnival for Toshio's homecoming, Matsu replaces a weary drummer on a huge taiko drum, beating it with vigor and skill, delighting Toshio and the crowd. The effort causes a heart attack; Matsu collapses. Later, in a snowstorm, elderly drunken Matsu wanders the countryside, recalling Yoshioka memories. He collapses in the snow and freezes to death. Yoshiko discovers Matsu treasured family gifts and saved money for them, highlighting his devotion. His end is undignified, shown by his rickshaw wheel stopping.

== Cast ==
- Toshiro Mifune - Matsugoro (Muhōmatsu, "Wild Matsu")
- Hideko Takamine - Yoshiko Yoshioka
- Hiroshi Akutagawa - Capt. Kotaro Yoshioka
- Chishū Ryū - Shigezo Yuki
- Choko Iida - Otora (innkeeper)
- Haruo Tanaka - Kumakichi
- Jun Tatara - Theatre employee
- Kenji Kasahara - Toshio Yoshioka
- Kaoru Matsumoto - Young Toshio
- Nobuo Nakamura - Yoshiko's brother
- Ichirō Arishima - Medicine peddler
- Chieko Nakakita - Yoshiko's sister-in-law
- Seiji Miyaguchi - Fencing master
- Bokuzen Hidari

== Reception ==
The Rickshaw Man won the Golden Lion at the 19th Venice International Film Festival in 1958, becoming the second Japanese film after Akira Kurosawa's Rashōmon (1950) to receive the award. The film was praised for its emotional depth, exploration of social themes, and strong performances, particularly by Toshiro Mifune, while also drawing criticism for its narrative pacing and stylistic choices.

Researcher Karthick Ram Manoharan described it as an unusual departure for director Hiroshi Inagaki, highlighting its social realism and class commentary. He wrote, "Rickshaw Man is a compelling family drama with elements of social critique that is usually absent in Inagaki’s staple fare. Without chanbara and without any racy action sequences, Rickshaw Man is still an engrossing film from the first shot onwards." Manoharan further noted Mifune's portrayal of Matsugoro as an "affable rowdyish character" embodying bushidō values like loyalty and self-denial, despite his humble status, and analyzed the rickshaw wheels as a leitmotif symbolizing the cycle of life and fatalism.

Hayley Scanlon commended Mifune's performance in capturing Matsugoro's transformation from an impulsive troublemaker to a devoted surrogate father, but critiqued the film's endorsement of hypermasculine ideals amid Japan's militaristic context. She observed, "Matsugoro is a big hearted man despite his intense masculinity, always acting with selfless kindness but also meekly accepting the fate his cards have dealt him rather than railing against the systems which have caged him all his life from his poverty to the perceived class differences which demand he keep his distance from the beautiful Yoshiko." Scanlon also compared it to Inagaki's 1943 original, suggesting the remake retains pre-war ideologies despite post-war freedoms, and questioned its resignation to outdated social codes.

Film scholar Andrea Grunert appreciated the 1958 version's deeper psychological focus compared to the wartime-constrained 1943 film, emphasizing Mifune's sensitive acting in conveying Matsugoro's unrequited love. Grunert praised the film's blend of sentimentalism, comedy, realism, and theatricality, as well as experimental elements like camera pans and montages, while viewing Matsugoro as an idealized model of manhood rooted in samurai-like purity, with the remake addressing class-divided desire more explicitly.

Patrick Galvan offered a more mixed assessment, praising the early comedic sequences and Mifune's warm performance but criticizing the film's later tedium and lack of emotional depth in relationships. He described it as "bloated, gimmicky, and monotonous by and large," with a script in "desperate need" of improvement, and considered the 1943 original likely superior.

== Awards ==
Director Hiroshi Inagaki won the Golden Lion award at the Venice Film Festival in 1958.

== Manga ==
A manga based on Rickshaw Man was published by Shueisha and serialized in the Weekly Shōnen Jump.
