= Samurai Trilogy =

The Samurai Trilogy
- Directed by: Hiroshi Inagaki
- Written by: Hideji Hōjō (play); Hiroshi Inagaki; Tokuhei Wakao; Eiji Yoshikawa (novel)
- Produced by: Kazuo Takimura
- Starring: Toshiro Mifune; Kaoru Yachigusa; Rentarō Mikuni
- Music by: Ikuma Dan
- Production company: Toho Studios
- Distributed by: Toho Studios
- Release dates: 1954 (1); 1955 (2); 1956 (3)
- Running time: 303 minutes
- Country: Japan
- Language: Japanese

The Samurai Trilogy is a film trilogy directed by Hiroshi Inagaki and starring Toshiro Mifune as Musashi Miyamoto and Kōji Tsuruta as Kojirō Sasaki. The films are based on Musashi, a novel by Eiji Yoshikawa about the famous duelist and author of The Book of Five Rings.

The three films are:

- Samurai I: Musashi Miyamoto (1954)
- Samurai II: Duel at Ichijoji Temple (1955)
- Samurai III: Duel at Ganryu Island (1956)

Together, they form a trilogy that follows the development of Musashi from a young soldier to a more reflective samurai.

The choreography for the films was by Yoshio Sugino of the Tenshin Shōden Katori Shintō-ryū.

== Reception and influence ==
Samurai I won the 1955 Academy Award for Best Foreign Language Film.

In a review almost 60 years after the release of the trilogy, the late academic and film critic Stephen Prince noted "the absence of gore" in the films: "Severed limbs and spurting arteries hadn't yet arrived as a movie convention, and the fights in The Samurai Trilogy are relatively chaste, not showing the carnage that such duels would have actually resulted in".

The trilogy became an influence for future films.
