= Hiroshi Inagaki =

Japanese filmmaker (1905–1980)

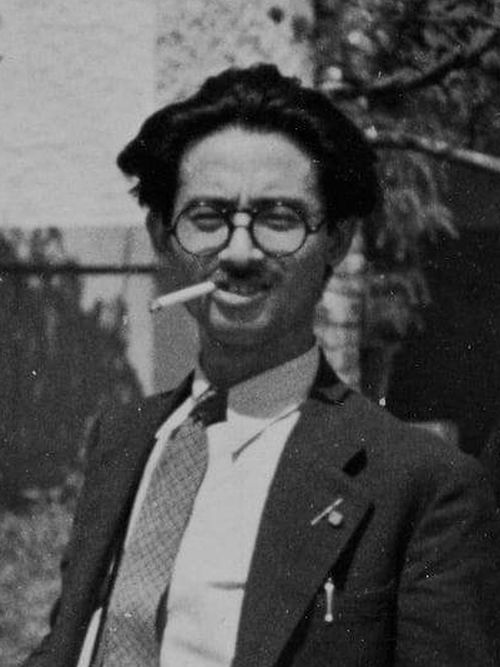
- Inagaki c. 1930s
- Born: 30 December 1905; Tokyo, Japan
- Died: 21 May 1980 (aged 74); Tokyo, Japan
- Occupations: director, screenwriter, producer, actor
- Years active: 1923–1979
- Awards: Academy Honorary Award; 1956 Miyamoto Musashi; Golden Lion; 1958 Rickshaw Man

Hiroshi Inagaki (Japanese: 稲垣 浩, Hepburn: Inagaki Hiroshi; 30 December 1905 – 1 May 1980) was a Japanese filmmaker who worked on over 100 films in a career spanning over five decades. He is one of the most successful and critically acclaimed filmmakers in the history of Japanese cinema, having directed several jidaigeki epics such as the 1954 Academy Award-winning film Samurai I: Musashi Miyamoto, and its two sequels Samurai II: Duel at Ichijoji Temple (1955) and Samurai III: Duel at Ganryu Island (1956).

== Career ==
Born in Tokyo as the son of a shinpa actor, Inagaki appeared on stage in his childhood before joining the Nikkatsu studio as an actor in 1922. Wishing to become a director, he joined Chiezō Kataoka's Chiezō Productions and made his directorial debut with Tenka taiheiki (1928). Returning to Nikkatsu, he continued making jidaigeki and participated in the Naritaki Group of young filmmakers such as Sadao Yamanaka and Fuji Yahiro who collaboratively wrote screenplays under the made up name "Kinpachi Kajiwara". Like others in the group, Inagaki was known for his cheerful and intelligent samurai films. Inagaki later moved to Daiei and then Toho, where he made big budget color spectacles as well as delicate works depicting the feelings of children. He also produced many films and wrote the scripts for dozens of others. He directed Toshiro Mifune in twenty films.

== Recognition ==
His film Muhōmatsu no isshō (Rickshaw Man, 1943) was selected as the 8th best Japanese film of all time in a 1989 poll of Japanese critics and filmmakers. The color remake, Rickshaw Man (1958), won the Golden Lion award at that year's Venice Film Festival. His film Samurai I: Musashi Miyamoto (1954) won the honorary Academy Award for Best Foreign Language Film.

== Selected filmography ==
=== Director ===
- Tenka taiheiki (天下太平記) (1928)
- Hōrō zanmai (放浪三昧) (1928)
- Muhōmatsu no isshō (無法松の一生) (Rickshaw Man) (1943)
- Noroshi wa Shanghai ni agaru (狼火は上海に揚る 春江遺恨 literally: Signal Fires of Shanghai) (1944)
- Sword for Hire (戦国無頼 Sengoku burai) (1952)
- Samurai Trilogy
  - Samurai I: Musashi Miyamoto (宮本武蔵) (1954)
  - Samurai II: Duel at Ichijoji Temple (続宮本武蔵 一乗寺の決闘 Zoku Miyamoto Musashi: Ichijōji no kettō) (1955)
  - Samurai III: Duel at Ganryu Island (決闘巌流島 Kettō Ganryūjima) (1956)
- The Lone Journey a.k.a. The Road (旅路 Tabiji) (1955)
- Arashi (嵐) (1956)
- Yagyu Secret Scrolls (柳生武芸帳 Yagyū Bugeichō) (1957)
- Rickshaw Man (無法松の一生) (1958)
- Yagyu Secret Scrolls part II (柳生武芸帳 双龍秘剣 Yagyū Bugeichō–Sōryū hiken) a.k.a. Ninjitsu (1958)
- The Birth of Japan (日本誕生, Nippon Tanjō), also called The Three Treasures (1959)
- Life of an Expert Swordsman (或る剣豪の生涯 Aru kengō no shōgai) (1959)
- The Story of Osaka Castle (大阪城物語 Ōsaka-jō monogatari) (1961)
- Chushingura: Hana no Maki, Yuki no Maki (忠臣蔵 花の巻 雪の巻) (1962)
- The Secret Sword (秘剣 Hiken) (1963)
- Whirlwind (Shikonmado - Dai tatsumaki) (1964)
- Sasaki Kojiro—Zenpen: Fuun Osaka-jo Kohen: Ketto Ganryushima (a.k.a. Kojiro) (1967)
- Samurai Banners (風林火山 Fūrin Kazan) (1969)
- Machibuse (待ち伏せ) (1970)

=== Producer ===
- Shinsengumi (新選組) (1969)

== Bibliography ==
- Inagaki, Hiroshi (1978). Nihon eiga no wakaki hibi. Tokyo: Mainichi Shinbunsha.
