= Sword for Hire =

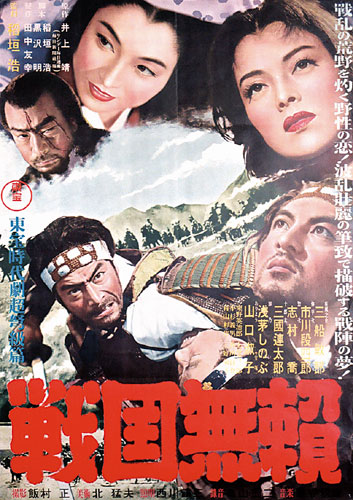
- Theatrical release poster
- Directed by: Hiroshi Inagaki
- Screenplay by: Hiroshi Inagaki; Akira Kurosawa
- Based on: The serialized novel by Yasushi Inoue
- Produced by: Tomoyuki Tanaka
- Starring: Toshiro Mifune; Rentarō Mikuni; Yoshiko Yamaguchi; Danshiro Ichikawa
- Cinematography: Tadashi Iimura
- Music by: Ikuma Dan
- Production company: Toho
- Distributed by: Toho
- Release date: 22 May 1952 (Japan)
- Running time: 134 minutes
- Country: Japan

Sword for Hire (戦国無頼, Sengoku burai) (lit. 'Vagabonds in a Country at War') is a 1952 black-and-white Japanese film directed by Hiroshi Inagaki. The film is based on a serialized novel by Yasushi Inoue published in the Sunday Mainichi.

== Cast ==
- Toshiro Mifune as Hayate
- Kenzo Tabu
- Yoshiko Yamaguchi as O'Ryo

== Release ==
Sword for Hire was released in Japan on 22 May 1952 where it was distributed by Toho.

The film was released in the United States on November 15, 1956, by Topaz Film Company with English subtitles and a narration by Bob Booth. The Topaz version was produced by Toho.
