= Toshiro Mifune =

Japanese actor (1920–1997)

- 三船 敏郎
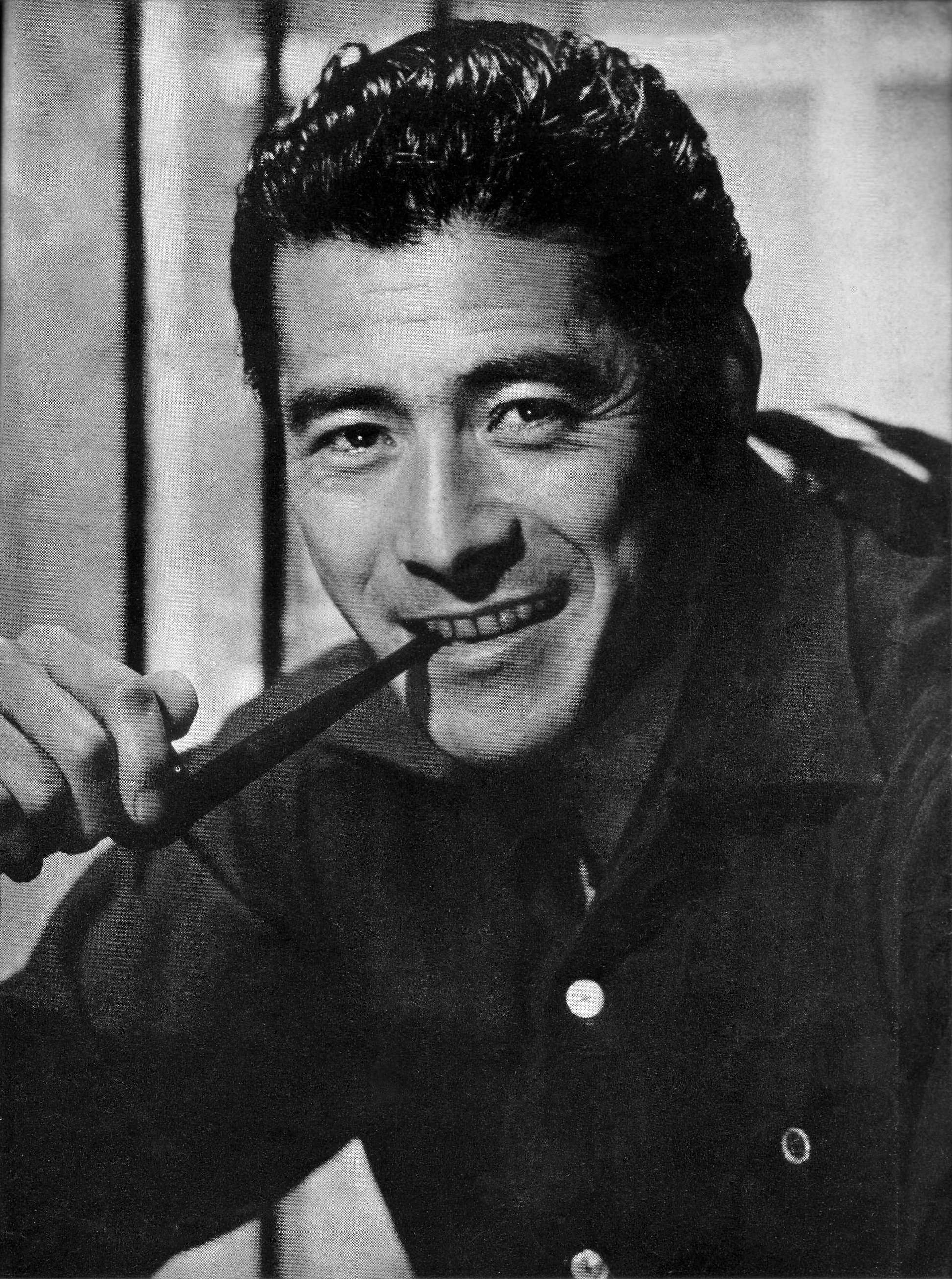
- Mifune in 1954
- Born: 1 April 1920; Qingdao, Shandong, China
- Died: 24 December 1997 (aged 77); Mitaka, Tokyo, Japan
- Resting place: Kawasaki, Kanagawa, Japan
- Occupations: Actor; film producer; film director
- Years active: 1947–1995
- Spouse: Sachiko Yoshimine (m. 1950; died 1995)
- Partner: Mika Kitagawa
- Children: 3
- Military career
- Allegiance: Empire of Japan
- Branch: Imperial Japanese Army Air Service
- Service years: 1940–1945
- Rank: Sergeant
- Unit: Aerial Photography
- Conflicts: World War II

- Website: mifuneproductions.co.jp

Toshiro Mifune (三船 敏郎, Mifune Toshirō; 1 April 1920 – 24 December 1997) was a Japanese actor and producer. The recipient of numerous awards and accolades over a lengthy career, he is widely considered one of the greatest actors of all time. Noted for his commanding screen presence in the Japanese film industry, he typically played hypermasculine or heroic characters.

Although he amassed more than 180 screen credits, Mifune is best known for his 16 collaborations with director Akira Kurosawa. These collaborations included Kurosawa's critically acclaimed jidaigeki films such as Rashomon (1950), for which Mifune won the San Marco Golden Lion at the Venice Film Festival, Seven Samurai (1954), Throne of Blood (1957), The Hidden Fortress (1958), and Yojimbo (1961), for which Mifune won the Volpi Cup for Best Actor at the Venice Film Festival and was recognised at the Blue Ribbon Awards as Best Actor. He also portrayed Miyamoto Musashi in Hiroshi Inagaki's Samurai Trilogy (1954–1956), Lord Toranaga in the NBC television miniseries Shōgun, and Admiral Isoroku Yamamoto in three different films.

In 1962, he established Mifune Productions, achieving success with large-scale works including The Sands of Kurobe (1968) and Samurai Banners (1969). He also starred in his directorial debut Legacy of the 500,000 (1963). Following his performance in the 1965 film Red Beard, which won him the Best Actor at the Venice Film Festival for a second time, Mifune turned to roles abroad. He starred in films such as Ánimas Trujano (1962), for which he won another Blue Ribbon Award for Best Actor, Grand Prix (1966), which was his Hollywood debut, Hell in the Pacific (1968), Red Sun (1971), Paper Tiger (1975), Midway (1976), and Steven Spielberg's 1941 (1979).

Mifune died of organ failure on 24 December 1997. In 1999, he was inducted into the Martial Arts History Museum Hall of Fame. He is the subject of the feature-length documentary, Mifune: The Last Samurai (2015), about his life and his films. In 2016, his name was inscribed on the Hollywood Walk of Fame.

== Early life ==
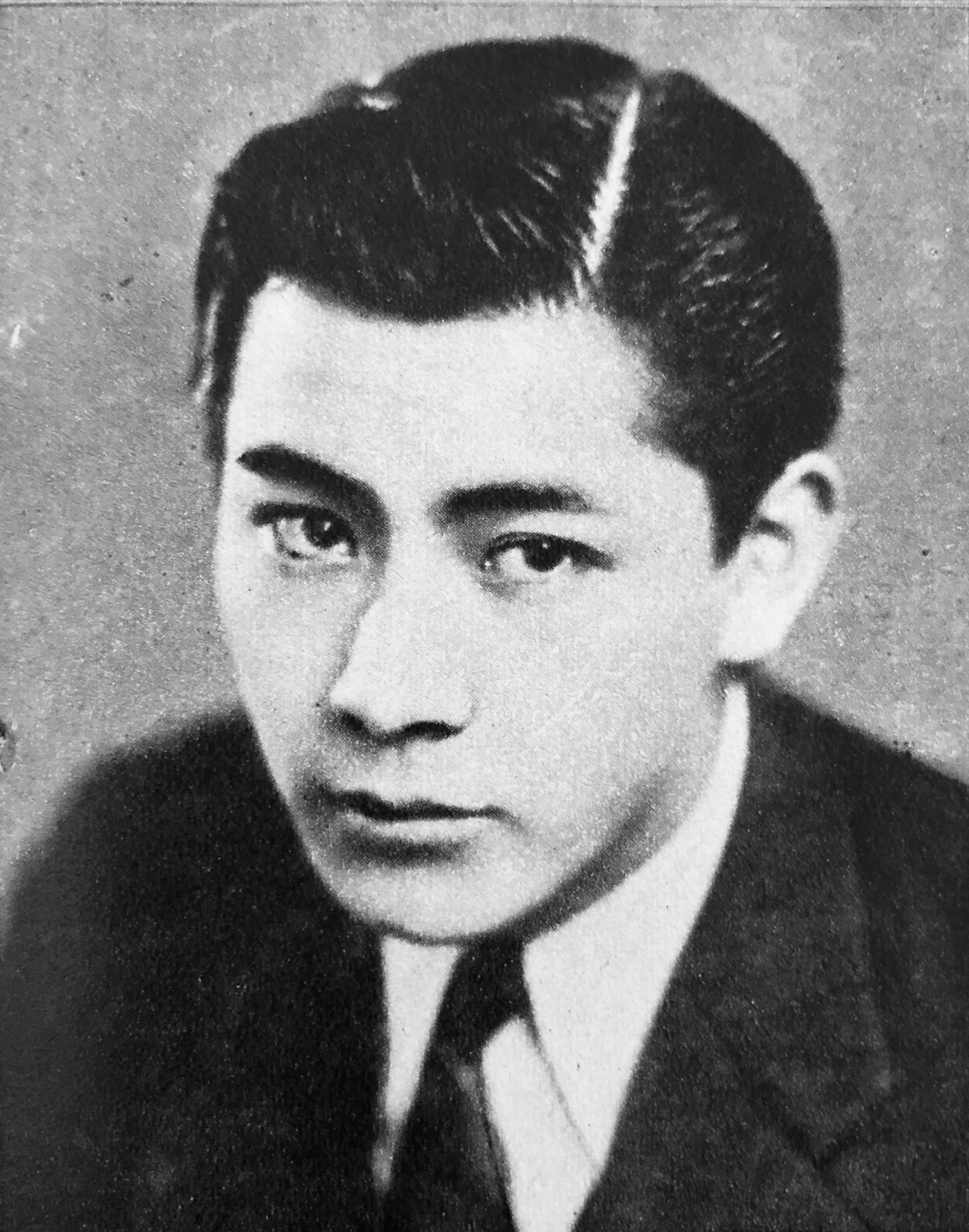
Mifune in 1939

Toshiro Mifune was born on 1 April 1920, in Seitō, Japanese-occupied Shandong (present-day Qingdao, China), the eldest son of Tokuzo and Sen Mifune. His father Tokuzo was a trade merchant and photographer who ran a photography business in Qingdao and Yingkou, and the son of a physician from Kawauchi, Akita Prefecture. His mother Sen was the daughter of a hatamoto, a high-ranking samurai official. Toshiro's parents, who were working as Methodist missionaries, were some of the Japanese citizens encouraged to live in Shandong by the Japanese government during its occupation before the Republic of China took over the city in 1922. Mifune grew up with his parents and two younger siblings in Dalian, Fengtian from the age of 4 to 19.

In his youth, Mifune worked at his father's photo studio. After spending the first 19 years of his life in China, as a Japanese citizen, he was drafted into the Imperial Japanese Army Aviation division, where he served in the Aerial Photography unit during World War II.

== Career ==
=== Early work ===
In 1947, a large number of Toho Productions actors, after a prolonged strike, had left to form their own company, Shin Toho. Toho then organized a "new faces" contest to find new talent.

Nenji Oyama, a friend of Mifune's who worked for the Photography Department of Toho, sent Mifune's resume to the New Faces audition as the Photography Department was full, telling Mifune he could later transfer to the Photography Department if he wished. He was accepted, along with 48 others (out of roughly 4,000 applicants), and allowed to take a screen test for Kajirō Yamamoto. Instructed to mime anger, he drew from his wartime experiences. Yamamoto took a liking to Mifune, recommending him to director Senkichi Taniguchi. This led to Mifune's first feature role, in Shin Baka Jidai.

Mifune first encountered director Akira Kurosawa when Toho Studios, the largest film production company in Japan, was conducting a massive talent search, during which hundreds of aspiring actors auditioned before a team of judges. Kurosawa was originally going to skip the event, but showed up when Hideko Takamine told him of one actor who seemed especially promising. Kurosawa later wrote that he entered the audition to see "a young man reeling around the room in a violent frenzy ... it was as frightening as watching a wounded beast trying to break loose. I was transfixed." When Mifune, exhausted, finished his scene, he sat down and gave the judges an ominous stare. He lost the competition but Kurosawa was impressed. "I am a person rarely impressed by actors," he later said. "But in the case of Mifune I was completely overwhelmed." Mifune immersed himself into the six-month training and diligently applied himself to studying acting, although at first he still hoped to be transferred to the camera department.

=== 1950s–1990s ===
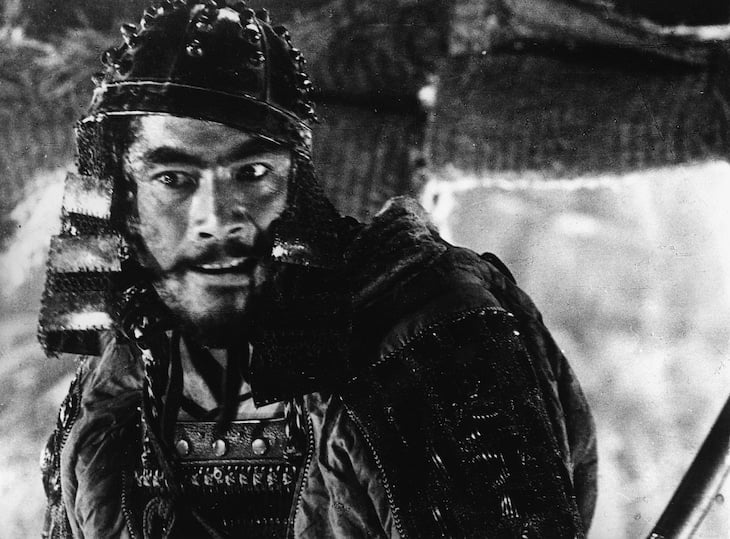
Mifune in Seven Samurai (1954)

His imposing bearing, acting range, facility with foreign languages and lengthy partnership with acclaimed director Akira Kurosawa made him the most famous Japanese actor of his time, and easily the best known to Western audiences. He often portrayed samurai or rōnin who were usually coarse and gruff (Kurosawa once explained that the only weakness he could find with Mifune and his acting ability was his "rough" voice), inverting the popular stereotype of the genteel, clean-cut samurai. In such films as Seven Samurai and Yojimbo, he played characters who were often comically lacking in manners, but replete with practical wisdom and experience, understated nobility, and, in the case of Yojimbo, unmatched fighting prowess. Sanjuro in particular contrasts this earthy warrior spirit with the useless, sheltered propriety of the court samurai. Kurosawa valued Mifune highly for his effortless portrayal of unvarnished emotion, once commenting that he could convey in only three feet of film an emotion for which the average Japanese actor would require ten feet. He starred in all three films of Hiroshi Inagaki's Samurai Trilogy (1954–1956), for which the first film in Samurai I: Musashi Miyamoto was awarded an Honorary Academy Award. Mifune and Inagaki worked together on twenty films, which outnumbered his collaborations with Kurosawa, with all but two falling into the jidaigeki genre, most notably with Rickshaw Man (1958), which won the Venice Film Festival Golden Lion.

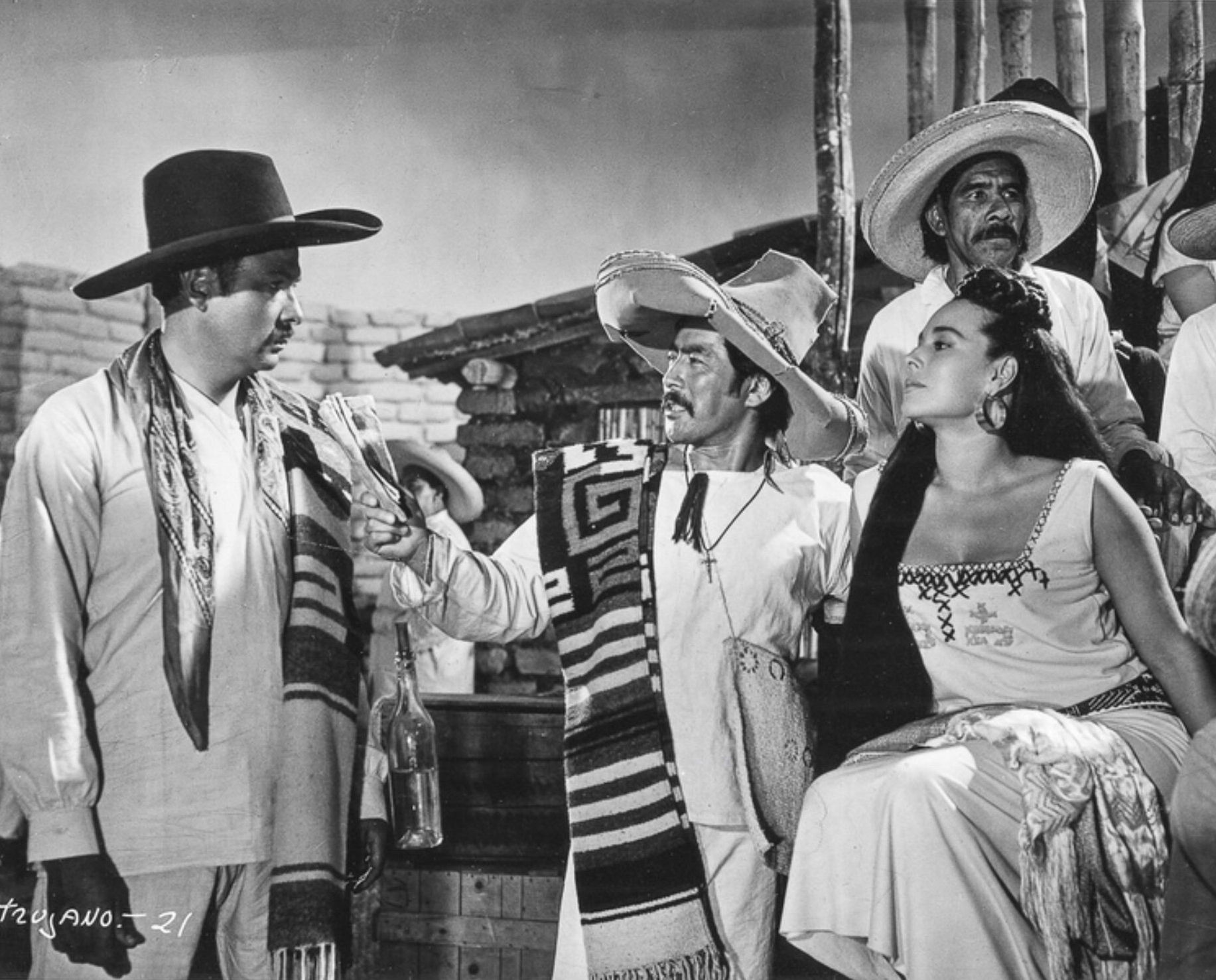
From left to right: Antonio Aguilar, Toshiro Mifune, and Flor Silvestre in Animas Trujano (1964)

He was also known for the effort he put into his performances. To prepare for Seven Samurai and Rashomon, Mifune reportedly studied footage of lions in the wild. For the Mexican film Ánimas Trujano, he studied tapes of Mexican actors speaking so that he could recite all of his lines in Spanish. Many Mexicans believed that Toshiro Mifune could have passed for a native of Oaxaca due to his critically acclaimed performance. When asked why he chose Mexico to do his next film, Mifune quoted, "Simply because, first of all, Mr. Ismael Rodríguez convinced me; secondly, because I was eager to work in beautiful Mexico, of great tradition; and thirdly, because the story and character of 'Animas Trujano' seemed very human to me". The film was nominated for both a Golden Globe and an Oscar. Mifune gave a Japanese pistol as a gift to then-Mexican president Adolfo López Mateos when they met in Oaxaca.

Mifune has been credited as originating the "roving warrior" archetype, which he perfected during his collaboration with Kurosawa. His martial arts instructor was Yoshio Sugino of the Tenshin Shōden Katori Shintō-ryū. Sugino created the fight choreography for films such as Seven Samurai and Yojimbo, and Kurosawa instructed his actors to emulate his movements and bearing.

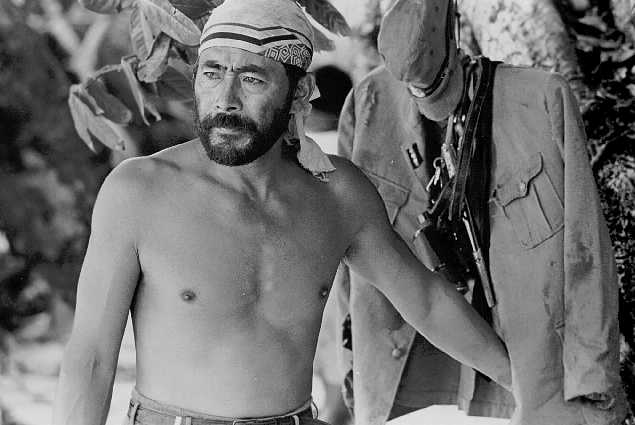
Mifune in Hell in the Pacific (1968)

Clint Eastwood was among the first of many actors to adopt this wandering ronin with no name persona for foreign films, which he used to great effect in his Western roles, especially in Spaghetti Westerns directed by Sergio Leone where he played the Man with No Name, a character similar to Mifune's seemingly-nameless rōnin in Yojimbo.

Mifune may also be credited with originating the yakuza archetype, with his performance as a mobster in Kurosawa's Drunken Angel (1948), the first yakuza film. Most of the sixteen Kurosawa–Mifune films are considered cinema classics. These include Drunken Angel, Stray Dog, Rashomon, Seven Samurai, The Hidden Fortress, High and Low, Throne of Blood (an adaptation of Shakespeare's Macbeth), Yojimbo, and Sanjuro.

Mifune and Kurosawa finally parted ways after Red Beard. Several factors contributed to the rift that ended this career-spanning collaboration. Mifune had a passion for film in his own right and had long wanted to set up a production company, working towards going freelance. Kurosawa and Taniguchi advised against it out of concern they would not be able to cast Mifune as freely. Most of Mifune's contemporaries acted in several different movies in this period. Since Red Beard required Mifune to grow a natural beard – one he had to keep for the entirety of the film's two years of shooting – he was unable to act in any other films during the production. This put Mifune and his financially strapped production company deeply into debt, creating friction between him and Kurosawa. Although Red Beard played to packed houses in Japan and Europe, which helped Mifune recoup some of his losses, the ensuing years held varying outcomes for both Mifune and Kurosawa. After the film's release, the careers of each man took different arcs: Mifune continued to enjoy success with a range of samurai and war-themed films (Rebellion, Samurai Assassin, The Emperor and a General, among others). In contrast, Kurosawa's output of films dwindled and drew mixed responses. During this time, Kurosawa attempted suicide. In 1980, Mifune experienced popularity with mainstream American audiences through his role as Lord Toranaga in the television miniseries Shogun, which Kurosawa criticised for its historical inaccuracy. Mifune spoke respectfully of Kurosawa and loyally attended the premiere of Kagemusha.

Mifune turned down an opportunity from United Artists to play the Japanese spy chief Tiger Tanaka in the James Bond film You Only Live Twice (1967). According to his daughter, he also turned down an offer from George Lucas to play either Darth Vader or Obi-Wan Kenobi in Star Wars (1977). Mifune was considered for the role of Spock's nemesis in the unproduced Star Trek film Star Trek: Planet of the Titans.

Mifune himself was always professional, memorizing all of his lines and not carrying scripts on set. He was seen as unusually humble for an international star, and was known for treating his co-stars and crew generously, throwing catered parties for them and paying for their families to go to onsen resorts. When American actor Scott Glenn was asked about his experience of filming The Challenge (1982) alongside Mifune, Glenn recalled disappointment that the original script (about "a surrogate father and son finding each other from completely different cultures") lost its "character-driven scenes" and was reduced to "a martial arts movie" but stated, "...I remember Mifune came to me, and he said, "Look, this is what's happening. I'm disappointed, and I know you are, but this is what it is. So you can either have your heart broken every day, or you can use this experience as an opportunity to be spending time in the most interesting time in Japan and let me be your tour guide." So it wound up with me learning an awful lot of stuff from Toshirô."

In 1979, Mifune joined the ensemble cast of the Steven Spielberg war comedy 1941 as the commander of a lost Imperial Japanese Navy submarine searching for Hollywood shortly after the Pearl Harbor attack. Mifune received wide acclaim in the West after playing Toranaga in the 1980 TV miniseries Shogun. However, the series' blunt portrayal of the Tokugawa Shogunate and the greatly abridged version shown in Japan meant that it was not as well received in his homeland.

The relationship between Kurosawa and Mifune remained ambivalent. Kurosawa criticized Mifune's acting in Interview magazine and also said that "All the films that I made with Mifune, without him, they would not exist". He also presented Mifune with the Kawashita award which he himself had won two years prior. They frequently encountered each other professionally and met again in 1993 at the funeral of their friend Ishirō Honda, but never collaborated again.

== Personal life ==
Among Mifune's fellow performers, one of the 32 women chosen during the new faces contest was Sachiko Yoshimine. Eight years Mifune's junior, she came from a respected Tokyo family. They fell in love and Mifune soon proposed marriage.

Director Senkichi Taniguchi, with the help of Akira Kurosawa, convinced the Yoshimine family to allow the marriage. The wedding took place in February 1950 at the Aoyama Gakuin Methodist Church.

In November of the same year, their first son, Shirō was born. In 1955, they had a second son, Takeshi. Mifune's daughter Mika was born to his mistress, actress Mika Kitagawa, in 1982.

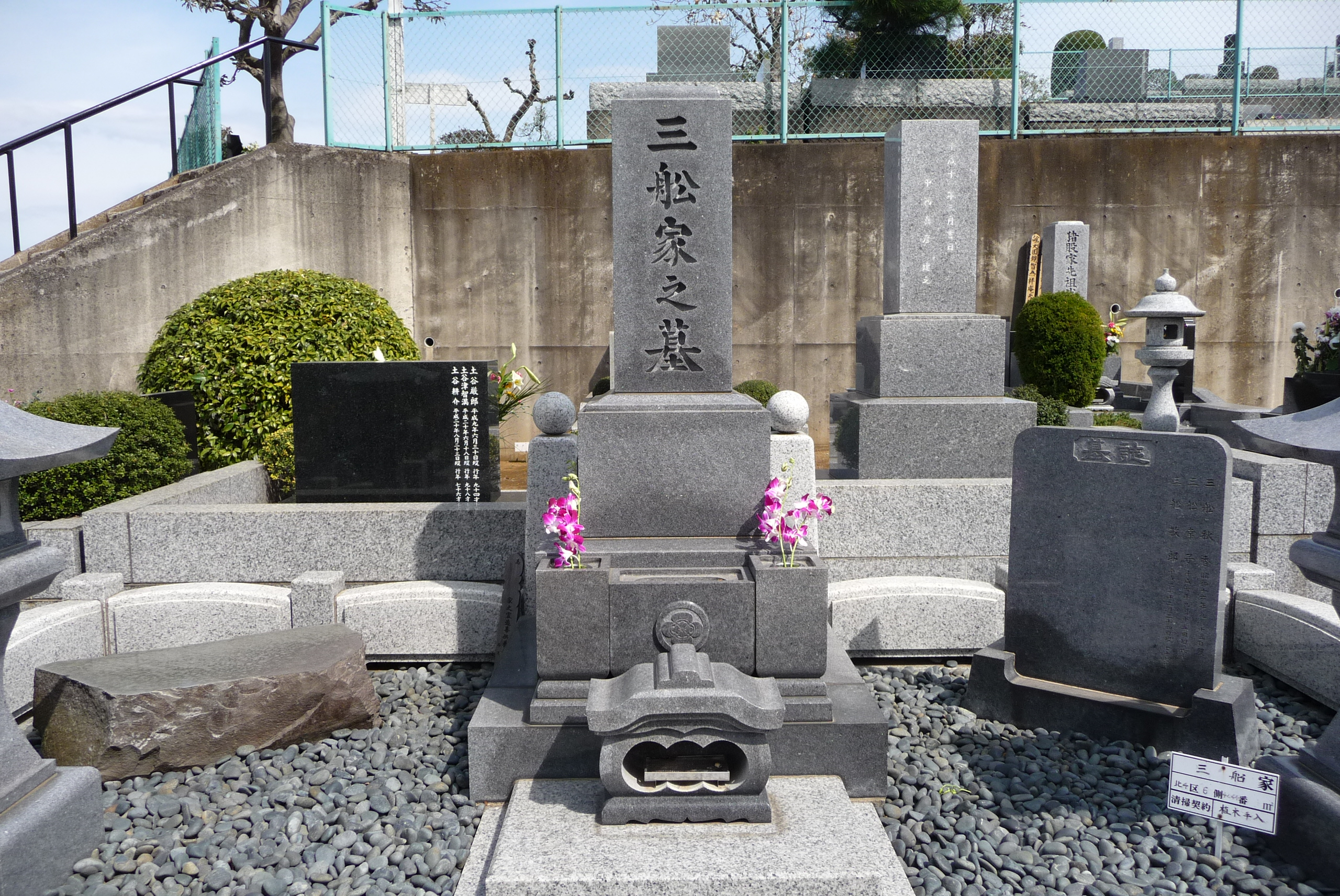
The Mifune family tomb in Kawasaki, Kanagawa

=== Death ===
On 24 December 1997, he died in Mitaka, Tokyo, of multiple organ failure at the age of 77.

=== Honors ===
Mifune won the Volpi Cup for Best Actor twice, in 1961 and 1965. He was awarded the Medal of Honor with Purple Ribbon in 1986 and the Order of the Sacred Treasure in 1993. In 1973, he was a member of the jury at the 8th Moscow International Film Festival. In 1977, he was a member of the jury at the 10th Moscow International Film Festival.

On 14 November 2016, Mifune received a star on the Hollywood Walk of Fame for his work in the motion picture industry.

== Personal quotations ==
Of Akira Kurosawa, Toshiro Mifune said, "I have never as an actor done anything that I am proud of other than with him".

Mifune had a kind of talent I had never encountered before in the Japanese film world. It was, above all, the speed with which he expressed himself that was astounding. The ordinary Japanese actor might need ten feet of film to get across an impression; Mifune needed only three. The speed of his movements was such that he said in a single action what took ordinary actors three separate movements to express. He put forth everything directly and boldly, and his sense of timing was the keenest I had ever seen in a Japanese actor. And yet with all his quickness, he also had surprisingly fine sensibilities.

— Akira Kurosawa, Something Like an Autobiography

"Since I came into the industry very inexperienced, I don't have any theory of acting. I just had to play my roles my way."

"Generally speaking, most East–West stories have been a series of cliches. I, for one, have no desire to retell Madame Butterfly."

"An actor is not a puppet with strings pulled by the director. He is a human being with seeds of all emotions, desires, and needs within himself. I attempt to find the very center of this humanity and explore and experiment."

== Legacy ==
Of Toshiro Mifune, in his 1991 book Cult Movie Stars, Danny Peary wrote,

Vastly talented, charismatic, and imposing (because of his strong voice and physique), the star of most of Akira Kurosawa's classics became the first Japanese actor since Sessue Hayakawa to have international fame. But where Hayakawa became a sex symbol because he was romantic, exotic, and suavely charming (even when playing lecherous villains), Mifune's sex appeal – and appeal to male viewers – was due to his sheer unrefined and uninhibited masculinity. He was attractive even when he was unshaven and unwashed, drunk, wide-eyed, and openly scratching himself all over his sweaty body, as if he were a flea-infested dog. He did indeed have animal magnetism – in fact, he based his wild, growling, scratching, superhyper Samurai recruit in The Seven Samurai on a lion. It shouldn't be forgotten that Mifune was terrific in Kurosawa's contemporary social dramas, as detectives or doctors, wearing suits and ties, but he will always be remembered for his violent and fearless, funny, morally ambivalent samurai heroes for Kurosawa, as well as in Hiroshi Inagaki's classic epic, The Samurai Trilogy.

Peary also wrote,

Amazingly physical, [Mifune] was a supreme action hero whose bloody, ritualistic, and, ironically, sometimes comical sword-fight sequences in Yojimbo and Sanjuro are classics, as well-choreographed as the greatest movie dances. His nameless sword-for-hire anticipated Clint Eastwood's 'Man With No Name' gunfighter. With his intelligence, eyes seemingly in back of his head, and experience evident in every thrust or slice, he has no trouble – and no pity – dispatching twenty opponents at a time (Bruce Lee must have been watching!). It is a testament to his skills as an actor that watching the incredible swordplay does not thrill us any more than watching his face during the battle or just the way he moves, without a trace of panic, across the screen – for no one walks or races with more authority, arrogance, or grace than Mifune's barefoot warriors. For a 20-year period, there was no greater actor – dynamic or action – than Toshiro Mifune. Just look at his credits.

In an article published in 2020 by The Criterion Collection in commemoration of the centenary of Mifune's birth, Moeko Fujii wrote,

For most of the past century, when people thought of a Japanese man, they saw Toshiro Mifune. A samurai, in the world's eyes, has Mifune's fast wrists, his scruff, his sidelong squint... He may have played warriors, but they weren't typical heroes: they threw tantrums and fits, accidentally slipped off mangy horses, yawned, scratched, chortled, and lazed. But when he extended his right arm, quick and low with a blade, he somehow summoned the tone of epics.

There's a tendency to make Mifune sound mythical. The leading man of Kurosawa-gumi, the Emperor's coterie, he would cement his superstar status in over 150 films in his lifetime, acting for other famed directors – Hiroshi Inagaki, Kajiro Yamamoto, Kihachi Okamoto – in roles ranging from a caped lover to a Mexican bandit.

Mifune's life on-screen centers solely around men. Women, when they do appear, feel arbitrary, mythical, temporary: it's clear that no one is really invested in the thrums of heterosexual desire... Toshiro Mifune cemented his reputation as an icon of masculinity right alongside Hollywood narratives of neutered Asian manhood. In 1961, Mifune provoked worldwide longing by swaggering around in Yojimbo, the same year that Mickey Rooney played the bucktoothed Mr. Yunioshi in Breakfast at Tiffany's. Looks-wise, he's the opposite of his predecessor, the silent film star Sessue Hayakawa – often christened the "first Hollywood sex symbol" – with his long, slim fingers and Yves Saint Laurent polish. But Mifune represents a development beyond Hayakawa's Japanese-man-on-screen, who, despite his huge white female fanbase, was always limited to roles of the "Oriental" villain, the menace, the impossible romantic lead: in 1957, Joe Franklin would tell Hayakawa in his talk show, "There were two things we were sure of in the silent movie era; the Indians never got the best of it, and Sessue Hayakawa never got the girl."

Mifune never wants the girl in the first place. So the men around him can't help but watch him a little open-mouthed, as he walks his slice of world, amused by and nonchalant about the stupor he leaves in his wake. "Who is he?," someone asks, and no one ever has a good answer. You can't help but want to walk alongside him, to figure it out.

== Filmography ==
Mifune appeared in roughly 170 feature films. In 2015, Steven Okazaki released Mifune: The Last Samurai, a documentary chronicling Mifune's life and career. Due to variations in translation from the Japanese and other factors, there are multiple titles to many of Mifune's films (see IMDb link). The titles shown here are the most common ones used in the United States, with the original Japanese title listed below it in parentheses. Mifune's filmography mainly consists of Japanese productions, unless noted otherwise (see Notes column).

=== Films ===
| Year | Title | Role | Director | Notes |
|---|---|---|---|---|
| 1947 | Snow Trail (銀嶺の果て) | Ejima | Senkichi Taniguchi | |
| 1947 | These Foolish Times (新馬鹿時代 前篇) | Genzaburō Ōno | Kajirō Yamamoto | |
| 1947 | These Foolish Times Part 2 (新馬鹿時代 後篇) | Genzaburō Ōno | Kajirō Yamamoto | |
| 1948 | Drunken Angel (醉いどれ天使) | Matsunaga | Akira Kurosawa | |
| 1949 | The Quiet Duel (静かなる決闘) | Kyōji Fujisaki | Akira Kurosawa | |
| 1949 | Jakoman and Tetsu (ジャコ萬と鉄) | Tetsu | Senkichi Taniguchi | |
| 1949 | Stray Dog (野良犬) | Detective Murakami | Akira Kurosawa | |
| 1950 | Conduct Report on Professor Ishinaka (石中先生行状記) | Teisaku Nagasawa | Mikio Naruse | |
| 1950 | Scandal (醜聞) | Ichirō Aoe | Akira Kurosawa | |
| 1950 | Engagement Ring (婚約指環) | Takeshi Ema | Keisuke Kinoshita | |
| 1950 | Rashomon (羅生門) | Tajōmaru | Akira Kurosawa | |
| 1950 | Escape from Prison (脱獄) | Shinkichi | Kajirō Yamamoto | |
| 1951 | Beyond Love and Hate (愛と憎しみの彼方へ) | Gorō Sakata | Senkichi Taniguchi | |
| 1951 | Elegy (悲歌) | Prosecutor Daisuke Toki | Kajirō Yamamoto | |
| 1951 | The Idiot (白痴) | Denkichi Akama | Akira Kurosawa | |
| 1951 | Pirates (海賊船) | Tora | Hiroshi Inagaki | |
| 1951 | Meeting of the Ghost Après-Guerre (戦後派お化け大会) | Kenji Kawakami | Kiyoshi Saeki | Special appearance |
| 1951 | Conclusion of Kojiro Sasaki: Duel at Ganryu Island (完結 佐々木小次郎 巌流島決闘) | Musashi Miyamoto | Hiroshi Inagaki | |
| 1951 | The Life of a Horsetrader (馬喰一代) | Yonetarō Katayama | Keigo Kimura | |
| 1951 | Who Knows a Woman's Heart (女ごころ誰が知る) | Mizuno | Kajirō Yamamoto | |
| 1952 | Vendetta for a Samurai (荒木又右衛門 決闘鍵屋の辻) | Mataemon Araki | Kazuo Mori | |
| 1952 | Foghorn (霧笛) | Chiyokichi | Senkichi Taniguchi | |
| 1952 | The Life of Oharu (西鶴一代女) | Katsunosuke | Kenji Mizoguchi | |
| 1952 | Golden Girl (金の卵) | | Yasuki Chiba | Supporting role |
| 1952 | Sword for Hire (戦国無頼) | Hayatenosuke Sasa | Hiroshi Inagaki | |
| 1952 | Tokyo Sweetheart (東京の恋人) | Kurokawa | Yasuki Chiba | |
| 1952 | Swift Current (激流) | Shunsuke Kosugi | Senkichi Taniguchi | |
| 1952 | The Man Who Came to Port (港へ来た男) | Gorō Niinuma | Ishirō Honda | |
| 1953 | My Wonderful Yellow Car (吹けよ春風) | Matsumura | Senkichi Taniguchi | |
| 1953 | The Last Embrace (抱擁) | Shinkichi/Hayakawa | Masahiro Makino | |
| 1953 | Sunflower Girl (ひまわり娘) | Ippei Hitachi | Yasuki Chiba | Originally released overseas as Love in a Teacup |
| 1953 | Eagle of the Pacific (太平洋の鷲) | Lieutenant Jōichi Tomonaga | Ishirō Honda | |
| 1954 | Seven Samurai (七人の侍) | Kikuchiyo | Akira Kurosawa | |
| 1954 | The Sound of Waves (潮騒) | Skipper of the Utashima-maru | Senkichi Taniguchi | |
| 1954 | Samurai I : Musashi Miyamoto (宮本武蔵) | Musashi Miyamoto (Takezō Shinmen) | Hiroshi Inagaki | |
| 1954 | The Black Fury (密輸船) | Eiichi Tsuda | Toshio Sugie | |
| 1955 | The Merciless Boss: A Man Among Men (顔役無用 男性No．1) | "Buick" Maki | Kajirō Yamamoto | |
| 1955 | All Is Well (天下泰平) | Daikichi Risshun | Toshio Sugie | |
| 1955 | All Is Well Part 2 (続天下泰平) | Daikichi Risshun | Toshio Sugie | |
| 1955 | No Time for Tears (男ありて) | Mitsuo Yano | Seiji Maruyama | |
| 1955 | Samurai II: Duel at Ichijoji Temple (続宮本武蔵 一乗寺の決斗) | Musashi Miyamoto | Hiroshi Inagaki | |
| 1955 | I Live in Fear (生きものの記録) | Kiichi Nakajima | Akira Kurosawa | |
| 1956 | Samurai III: Duel at Ganryu Island (宮本武蔵 完結篇 決闘巌流島) | Musashi Miyamoto | Hiroshi Inagaki | |
| 1956 | Rainy Night Duel (黒帯三国志) | Masahiko Koseki | Senkichi Taniguchi | |
| 1956 | The Underworld (暗黒街) | Chief Inspector Kumada | Kajirō Yamamoto | |
| 1956 | Settlement of Love (愛情の決算) | Shuntarō Ōhira | Shin Saburi | |
| 1956 | A Wife's Heart (妻の心) | Kenkichi Takemura | Mikio Naruse | |
| 1956 | Scoundrel (ならず者) | Kanji | Nobuo Aoyagi | |
| 1956 | Rebels on the High Seas (囚人船) | Tokuzō Matsuo | Hiroshi Inagaki | |
| 1957 | Throne of Blood (蜘蛛巣城) | Taketoki Washizu | Akira Kurosawa | |
| 1957 | A Man in the Storm (嵐の中の男) | Saburō Watari | Senkichi Taniguchi | |
| 1957 | Be Happy, These Two Lovers (この二人に幸あれ) | Toshio Maruyama | Ishirō Honda | |
| 1957 | Yagyu Secret Scrolls Part 1 (柳生武芸帳) | Tasaburō Kasumi | Hiroshi Inagaki | |
| 1957 | A Dangerous Hero (危険な英雄) | Athlete Kawada | Hideo Suzuki | |
| 1957 | The Lower Depths (どん底) | Sutekichi | Akira Kurosawa | |
| 1957 | Downtown (下町) | Yoshio Tsuruishi | Yasuki Chiba | |
| 1958 | Yagyu Secret Scrolls Part 2 (柳生武芸帳 双龍秘剣) | Tasaburō Ōtsuki | Hiroshi Inagaki | |
| 1958 | Holiday in Tokyo (東京の休日) | Jirō | Kajirō Yamamoto | |
| 1958 | Muhomatsu, The Rikshaw Man (無法松の一生) | Matsugorō Tomishima | Hiroshi Inagaki | |
| 1958 | Yaji and Kita on the Road (弥次喜多道中記) | Toshinoshin Taya | Yasuki Chiba | |
| 1958 | All About Marriage (結婚のすべて) | Acting Teacher | Kihachi Okamoto | Cameo |
| 1958 | Theater of Life (人生劇場 青春篇) | Hishakaku | Toshio Sugie | |
| 1958 | The Hidden Fortress (隠し砦の三悪人) | General Rokurota Makabe | Akira Kurosawa | |
| 1959 | Boss of the Underworld (暗黒街の顔役) | Daisuke Kashimura | Kihachi Okamoto | |
| 1959 | Samurai Saga (或る剣豪の生涯) | Heihachirō Komaki | Hiroshi Inagaki | |
| 1959 | The Saga of the Vagabonds (戦国群盗伝) | Rokurō Kai | Toshio Sugie | |
| 1959 | Desperado Outpost (独立愚連隊) | Battalion Commander Kodama | Kihachi Okamoto | |
| 1959 | The Three Treasures (日本誕生) | Yamato Takeru/Susanoo-no-Mikoto | Hiroshi Inagaki | |
| 1960 | The Last Gunfight (暗黒街の対決) | Detective Saburō Fujioka | Kihachi Okamoto | |
| 1960 | The Gambling Samurai (国定忠治) | Kunisada Chūji | Senkichi Taniguchi | |
| 1960 | Storm Over the Pacific (ハワイ·ミッドウェイ大海空戦 太平洋の嵐) | Tamon Yamaguchi | Shūe Matsubayashi | |
| 1960 | Man Against Man (男対男) | Kaji | Senkichi Taniguchi | |
| 1960 | The Bad Sleep Well (悪い奴ほどよく眠る) | Kōichi Nishi | Akira Kurosawa | |
| 1960 | Salaryman Chushingura Part 1 (サラリーマン忠臣蔵) | Kazuo Momoi | Toshio Sugie | |
| 1961 | The Story of Osaka Castle (大坂城物語) | Mohei | Hiroshi Inagaki | |
| 1961 | Salaryman Chushingura Part 2 (続サラリーマン忠臣蔵) | Kazuo Momoi | Toshio Sugie | |
| 1961 | Yojimbo (用心棒) | Sanjūrō Kuwabata | Akira Kurosawa | |
| 1961 | The Youth and his Amulet (ゲンと不動明王) | Fudō Myō-ō | Hiroshi Inagaki | |
| 1961 | Ánimas Trujano | Ánimas Trujano | Ismael Rodríguez | Mexican production |
| 1962 | Sanjuro (椿三十郎) | Sanjūrō Tsubaki | Akira Kurosawa | |
| 1962 | Tatsu (どぶろくの辰) | Tatsu | Hiroshi Inagaki | |
| 1962 | Three Gentlemen Return from Hong Kong (続·社長洋行記) | Cho Chishō | Toshio Sugie | Cameo |
| 1962 | Chushingura: Story of Flower, Story of Snow (忠臣蔵 花の巻·雪の巻) | Genba Tawaraboshi | Hiroshi Inagaki | |
| 1963 | Attack Squadron! (太平洋の翼) | Lt. Colonel Senda | Shūe Matsubayashi | |
| 1963 | High and Low (天国と地獄) | Kingo Gondō | Akira Kurosawa | |
| 1963 | Legacy of the 500,000 (五十万人の遺産) | Takeichi Matsuo | Toshiro Mifune | Also Director and Producer |
| 1963 | Samurai Pirate (大盗賊) | Sukezaemon Naya/Sinbad | Senkichi Taniguchi | Release in the U.S. as The Lost World of Sinbad |
| 1964 | Whirlwind (士魂魔道 大龍巻) | Akashi Takenori | Hiroshi Inagaki | |
| 1965 | Samurai Assassin (侍) | Tsuruchiyo Niiro | Kihachi Okamoto | |
| 1965 | Red Beard (赤ひげ) | Dr. Kyojō Niide | Akira Kurosawa | |
| 1965 | Sanshiro Sugata (姿三四郎) | Shōgorō Yano | Seiichirô Uchikawa | |
| 1965 | The Retreat from Kiska (太平洋奇跡の作戦 キスカ) | Major General Omura | Seiji Maruyama | |
| 1965 | Fort Graveyard (血と砂) | Sergeant Kosugi | Kihachi Okamoto | Also Producer |
| 1966 | Rise Against the Sword (暴れ豪右衛門) | Shinobu no Gōemon | Hiroshi Inagaki | |
| 1966 | The Sword of Doom (大菩薩峠) | Toranosuke Shimada | Kihachi Okamoto | |
| 1966 | The Adventure of Kigan Castle (奇巌城の冒険) | Ōsumi | Senkichi Taniguchi | Also producer |
| 1966 | The Mad Atlantic (怒涛一万浬) | Heihachirō Murakami | Jun Fukuda | Also Executive Producer |
| 1966 | Grand Prix | Izō Yamura | John Frankenheimer | U.S. production |
| 1967 | Samurai Rebellion (上意討ち 拝領妻始末) | Isaburō Sasahara | Masaki Kobayashi | Also Producer |
| 1967 | Japan's Longest Day (日本のいちばん長い日) | Korechika Anami | Kihachi Okamoto | |
| 1968 | The Sands of Kurobe (黒部の太陽) | Satoshi Kitagawa | Kei Kumai | |
| 1968 | Admiral Yamamoto (連合艦隊司令長官 山本五十六) | Isoroku Yamamoto | Seiji Maruyama | |
| 1968 | The Day the Sun Rose (祇園祭) | Kumaza | Daisuke Itō and Tetsuya Yamanouchi | |
| 1968 | Hell in the Pacific | Captain Tsuruhiko Kuroda | John Boorman | U.S. production |
| 1969 | Samurai Banners (風林火山) | Yamamoto Kansuke | Hiroshi Inagaki | Also producer |
| 1969 | Safari 5000 (栄光への5000キロ) | Yūichirō Takase | Koreyoshi Kurahara | |
| 1969 | The Battle of the Japan Sea (日本海大海戦) | Tōgō Heihachirō | Seiji Maruyama | |
| 1969 | Red Lion (赤毛) | Akage no Gonzō | Kihachi Okamoto | Also Producer |
| 1969 | Shinsengumi (新選組) | Kondō Isami | Tadashi Sawashima | also Producer |
| 1970 | Zatoichi Meets Yojimbo (座頭市と用心棒) | Daisaku Sasa | Kihachi Okamoto | |
| 1970 | Bakumatsu (幕末) | Gotō Shōjirō | Daisuke Itō | |
| 1970 | Incident at Blood Pass (待ち伏せ) | Tōzaburō Shinogi | Hiroshi Inagaki | also Producer |
| 1970 | The Walking Major (ある兵士の賭け) | Tadao Kinugasa | Keith Larsen | |
| 1970 | The Militarists (激動の昭和史 軍閥) | Isoroku Yamamoto | Hiromichi Horikawa | |
| 1971 | Red Sun | Jūbei Kuroda | Terence Young | French. Italian, and Spanish co-production |
| 1971 | Morning for Two 二人だけの朝 | N/A | Takeshi Matsumori | Producer |
| 1975 | Paper Tiger | Ambassador Kagoyama | Ken Annakin | U.K. production |
| 1975 | The New Spartans | WW2 vet | Jack Starrett | U.K., West German co-production; Incomplete |
| 1976 | Midway | Isoroku Yamamoto | Jack Smight | U.S. production Voice dubbed by Paul Frees |
| 1977 | Proof of the Man (人間の証明) | Yōhei Kōri | Junya Satō | Special appearance |
| 1977 | Japanese Godfather: Ambition (日本の首領 野望篇) | Kōsuke Ōishi | Sadao Nakajima | |
| 1978 | Shogun's Samurai (柳生一族の陰謀) | Tokugawa Yoshinao | Kinji Fukasaku | |
| 1978 | Shag (犬笛) | Captain Takeo Murata | Sadao Nakajima | Also Executive Producer |
| 1978 | Ogin-sama (お吟さま) | Toyotomi Hideyoshi | Kei Kumai | |
| 1978 | The Fall of Ako Castle (赤穂城断絶) | Chikara Tsuchiya | Kinji Fukasaku | |
| 1978 | Japanese Godfather: Conclusion (日本の首領 完結篇) | Kōsuke Ōishi | Sadao Nakajima | |
| 1978 | Lord Incognito (水戸黄門) | Sakuzaemon Okumura | Tetsuya Yamanouchi | |
| 1979 | Winter Kills | Keith | William Richert | U.S. production |
| 1979 | The Adventures of Kosuke Kindaichi (金田一耕助の冒険) | Kindaichi Kosuke | Nobuhiko Obayashi | |
| 1979 | Onmitsu Doshin: The Edo Secret Police (隠密同心·大江戸捜査網) | Matsudaira Sadanobu | Akinori Matsuo | Also Producer |
| 1979 | 1941 | Commander Akiro Mitamura | Steven Spielberg | U.S. production |
| 1980 | The Battle of Port Arthur (二百三高地) | Emperor Meiji | Toshio Masuda | |
| 1980 | Shogun (将軍 SHOGUN) | Toranaga Yoshii | Jerry London | U.S., Japanese co-production |
| 1981 | Inchon! | Saitō-san | Terence Young | U.S. production |
| 1981 | Bushido Blade | Commander Hayashi Akira | Tsugunobu Kotani | U.S., U.K., Japanese co-production |
| 1982 | The Challenge | Toru Yoshida | John Frankenheimer | U.S. production |
| 1982 | Conquest (制覇) | Masao Tadokoro | Sadao Nakajima | |
| 1983 | Battle Anthem (日本海大海戦 海ゆかば) | Heihachirō Tōgō | Toshio Masuda | |
| 1983 | Theater of Life (人生劇場) | Hyōtarō Aonari | Junya Satō, Sadao Nakajima, and Kinji Fukasaku | Special appearance |
| 1984 | The Miracle of Joe Petrel (海燕ジョーの奇跡) | Fisherman | Toshiya Fujita | |
| 1985 | Legend of the Holy Woman (聖女伝説) | Kōzō Kanzaki | Tōru Murakawa | Special appearance |
| 1986 | Song of the Genkai Sea (玄海つれづれ節) | Kyūbei Matsufuji | Masanobu Deme | |
| 1987 | Shatterer | Murai | Tonino Valerii | Italian, Japanese co-production |
| 1987 | Tora-san Goes North (男はつらいよ 知床慕情) | Junkichi Ueno | Yoji Yamada | |
| 1987 | Princess from the Moon (竹取物語) | Taketori-no-Miyatsuko | Kon Ichikawa | |
| 1989 | Death of a Tea Master (千利休 本覺坊遺文) | Sen no Rikyū | Kei Kumai | |
| 1989 | The Demon Comes in Spring (春来る鬼) | Kukkune no jî | Akira Kobayashi | |
| 1989 | CF Girl (CFガール) | Shūichirō Hase | Izo Hashimoto | |
| 1991 | Strawberry Road (ストロベリーロード) | Taoka | Koreyoshi Kurahara | |
| 1991 | Journey of Honor (兜 KABUTO) | Tokugawa Ieyasu | Gordon Hessler | U.S., U.K., Japanese co-production |
| 1992 | Shadow of the Wolf | Kroomak | Jacques Dorfmann and Pierre Magny | Canadian, French co-production |
| 1994 | Picture Bride | The Benshi | Kayo Hatta | U.S. production |
| 1995 | Deep River (深い河) | Tsukada | Kei Kumai | Final film role |

The 1999 Danish film Mifune is named after the actor.

=== Television ===
All programs originally aired in Japan except for Shōgun which aired in the U.S. on NBC in September 1980 before being subsequently broadcast in Japan on TV Asahi from 30 March to 6 April 1981.

| Date(s) | Title | Role | Notes |
|---|---|---|---|
| 1967.05.11 | He of the Sun (太陽のあいつ) | Himself | 1 episode |
| 1968–1969 | Five Freelance Samurai (五人の野武士) | Jirō Yoshikage Funayama | 6 episodes [Ep. 1,2,14,15,17,26] |
| 1971 | Daichūshingura (大忠臣蔵) | Kuranosuke Ōishi | All 52 episodes |
| 1972–1974 | Ronin of the Wilderness (荒野の素浪人) | Kujūrō Tōge | All 104 episodes, over two seasons; also producer |
| 1973 | Yojimbo of the Wilderness (荒野の用心棒) | Kujūrō Tōge | 5 episodes |
| 1975 | The Sword, the Wind, and the Lullaby (剣と風と子守唄) | Jūzaburō Toride | All 27 episodes |
| 1976 | The Secret Inspectors (隠し目付参上) | Naizen-no-shō Tsukumo/Izu-no-kami Nobuakira Matsudaira | 10 episodes [Ep. 1,2,3,4,7,10,11,18,22,26] |
| 1976 | Ronin in a Lawless Town (人魚亭異聞 無法街の素浪人) | Mr. Danna | All 23 episodes |
| 1977.07.16 | Ōedo Sōsamō (大江戸捜査網) | Yūgen Ōtaki | 1 episode |
| 1978 | Falcons of Edo (江戸の鷹 御用部屋犯科帖) | Kanbei Uchiyama | All 38 episodes |
| 1979.04.02 | Edo o Kiru IV (江戸を斬るIV) | Chiba Shusaku Narimasa | 1 episode special appearance [Ep. 8] |
| 1979 | Prosecutor Saburo Kirishima (検事霧島三郎) | Chief Prosecutor Mori | |
| 1979 | Akō Rōshi (赤穂浪士) | Sakon Tachibana | 1 episode |
| 1979–1980 | Fangs of Edo (江戸の牙) | Gunbei Asahina | 3 episodes [Ep. 1, 17, 26] |
| 1979 | Hideout in Room 7 (駆け込みビル7号室) | Gōsuke Saegusa | |
| 1980 | Shōgun | Toranaga Yoshii | All 5 parts |
| 1980.12.27 | It's 8 O'Clock! Everybody Gather 'Round (8時だョ!全員集合) | Himself | 1 episode (Note: Mifune's appearance on It's 8 O'Clock! Everybody Gather 'Round was to promote the upcoming New Year's broadcast of Sekigahara. Mifune appeared on stage in a comedic samurai sketch wearing his Sakon Shima armor from the mini-series. In addition, Mifune sang with the "Little Singers of Tokyo" in another segment) |
| 1981 | Sekigahara (関ヶ原) | Sakon Shima | All 3 parts |
| 1981–1982 | Ten Duels of Young Shingo (新吾十番勝負) | Tamon Umei | Two of three parts (Note: Ten Duels of Young Shingo Part 3, which did not feature Mifune but which concludes the story, aired on 30 July 1982) [Parts 1,2] |
| 1981.07.09 | My Daughter! Fly on the Wings of Love and Tears (娘よ！ 愛と涙の翼で翔べ) | | TV film |
| 1981.09.29 | Tuesday Suspense Theater: The Spherical Wilderness (火曜サスペンス劇場 球形の荒野) | Kenichirō Nogami | TV film |
| 1981–1982 | Bungo Detective Story (文吾捕物帳) | Shūsaku Chiba | 5 episodes [Ep. 5,10,13,18,26] |
| 1981–1983 | The Lowly Ronin (素浪人罷り通る) | Shūtō Shunka | TV film series, all 6 parts |
| 1982.09.19 | The Happy Yellow Handkerchief (幸福の黄色いハンカチ) | Kenzō Shima | 1 episode [Ep. 4] |
| 1983 | The Brave Man Says Little (勇者は語らず いま、日米自動車戦争は) | Ryūzō Kawana | All 4 episodes |
| 1983.11.03 | The Women of Osaka Castle (女たちの大坂城) | Tokugawa Ieyasu | TV film |
| 1983.11.10 | The Secret of Cruel Valley (魔境 殺生谷の秘密) | Lowly Rōnin | TV film |
| 1984 | The Burning Mountain River (山河燃ゆ) | Otoshichi Amō | |
| 1984.04.02 | Okita Soji: Swordsman of Fire (燃えて、散る 炎の剣士 沖田総司) | Shūsai Kondō | TV film |
| 1984.08.26 | Toshiba Sunday Theater #1442: Summer Encounter (東芝日曜劇場 第1442回 夏の出逢い) | Takeya Ōnuki | TV film |
| 1987.09.10 | Masterpiece Jidaigeki: National Advisor Breakthrough! Hikozaemon Geki (傑作時代劇 天下の御意見番罷り通る！彦左衛門外記) | Ōkubo Tadataka | 1 episode [Ep. 21] |
| 1990.04.20 | Heaven and Earth: Dawn Episode (天と地と～黎明編) | Nagao Tamekage | TV film |

== Awards and nominations ==
Mifune won and was nominated for many awards during his acting career, including six Blue Ribbon Awards, three Mainichi Film Awards, three Japan Academy Film Prize nominations (winning two), and two Kinema Junpo Awards.
