= Samurai III: Duel at Ganryu Island =

- Directed by: Hiroshi Inagaki
- Written by: Hideji Hojo (play); Hiroshi Inagaki; Tokuhei Wakao; Eiji Yoshikawa (novel)
- Produced by: Kazuo Takimura
- Starring: Toshiro Mifune; Kōji Tsuruta
- Music by: Ikuma Dan
- Production company: Toho Studios
- Distributed by: Toho Studios
- Release date: January 3, 1956
- Running time: 105 minutes
- Country: Japan
- Language: Japanese

Samurai III: Duel at Ganryu Island (Japanese: 宮本武蔵完結編 決闘巌流島, Hepburn: Miyamoto Musashi Kanketsuhen: Kettō Ganryūjima) is a 1956 Japanese film directed by Hiroshi Inagaki and starring Toshirō Mifune. Shot in Eastmancolor, it is the third and final film of Inagaki's Samurai Trilogy.

The film is adapted from Eiji Yoshikawa's novel Musashi, originally released as a serial in the Japanese newspaper Asahi Shimbun, between 1935 and 1939. The novel is loosely based on the life of the famous Japanese swordsman, Miyamoto Musashi. The preceding two parts of the trilogy are Samurai I: Musashi Miyamoto (1954) and Samurai II: Duel at Ichijoji Temple (1955).

== Plot ==
Miyamoto abandons his life as a knight errant. He's sought as a teacher and vassal by the Shogun, Japan's de facto leader. He is also challenged to fight by the supremely confident and skillful Sasaki Kojiro. Miyamoto agrees to fight Sasaki in a year's time but rejects the Shogun's patronage, choosing instead to live on the edge of a village in the Shimosa Province, raising vegetables. He's followed there by Otsu and later by Akemi, both in love with him.

In the city of Kokura in Japan, Sasaki kills multiple men in a battle in the street. The commotion resulting from the battle in the street garners the attention of Miyamoto who is nearby in the city. Miyamoto leaves his room to see what has occurred and notices the dead men in the street as well as a note from Sasaki claiming responsibility for the killing.

Sasaki and Miyamoto eventually meet one another and agree to a fight. However, on the day the fight is planned, Miyamoto decides to delay the fight for a year. During this year before the fight, Sasaki becomes acquainted with the upper class, while Miyamoto begins farming near a small village. Miyamoto seeks Otsu's forgiveness and accepts her love, then sets off across the water to Ganryu Island for his final contest. Sasaki is already on Ganryu Island, ready for their duel.

Miyamoto has strategically timed the duel to coincide with the breaking dawn and lures Sasaki to the water's edge. When the sun rises above the horizon behind Miyamoto, the light begins to blind Sasaki. In a single stroke, he kills Sasaki and is victorious. While the onlookers celebrate the win, Miyamoto forlornly looks down upon Sasaki, calling him "the greatest swordsman" he will ever encounter and silently mourns for him.

== Production ==
The film Samurai III: Duel at Ganryu Island, made in 1956, came after the end of the Allied occupation of Japan following World War II. "The Allied occupation initially restricted films promoting feudal values, putting the kibosh on this most Japanese of action genres".

This attitude relaxed somewhat in 1949, as the Occupation became more concerned with the threat of international communism and less with jidaigeki and chanbara. Inagaki himself had directed Kanketsu Sasaki Kojirô: Ganryû-jima kettô, an earlier black and white film about Sasaki that climaxes with the fatal duel between Miyamoto and Sasaki, in 1951. That film also featured Mifune in a brief appearance as Miyamoto that nonetheless won him a share of top billing, but starred Tomoemon Otani, a Kabuki actor who specialized in women's roles on stage, as Sasaki.

After the Allies left Japan in 1952, "the way was clear for the golden age of the samurai film", allowing Inagaki to specialize in the genre he had been most closely associated with before the war. World War II, the Allied occupation of Japan and then the Allies leaving certainly influenced Japanese film. Additionally, the film's character Musashi Miyamoto was an actual person who lived from 1584-1645 and was "famed for his two-handed fighting technique and his delicate touch with the Zen ink brush". The film also relates to Miyamoto’s actual battle with Sasaki, which took place on April 13, 1612 on Ganryu Island, located off the coast of the Bizen Province.

== Cast ==
- Toshirō Mifune as Miyamoto Musashi
- Kōji Tsuruta as Sasaki Kojirō
- Kaoru Yachigusa as Otsu
- Michiko Saga as Omitsu
- Mariko Okada as Akemi / Hanagiri
- Takashi Shimura as Sado Nagaoka, the court official
- Minoru Chiaki as Sasuke, the boatman
- Takamaru Sasaki as Omitsu's father
- Daisuke Katō as Toji Gion
- Haruo Tanaka as Kumagoro, the horse dealer
- Kichijiro Ueda as Priest Agon
- Kokuten Kodo as Old Priest Nikkan
- Ikio Sawamura as Innkeeper
- Kenjin Iida as Jotaro
