= Tatsuya Mihashi =

Japanese actor (1923–2004)

- 三橋 達也
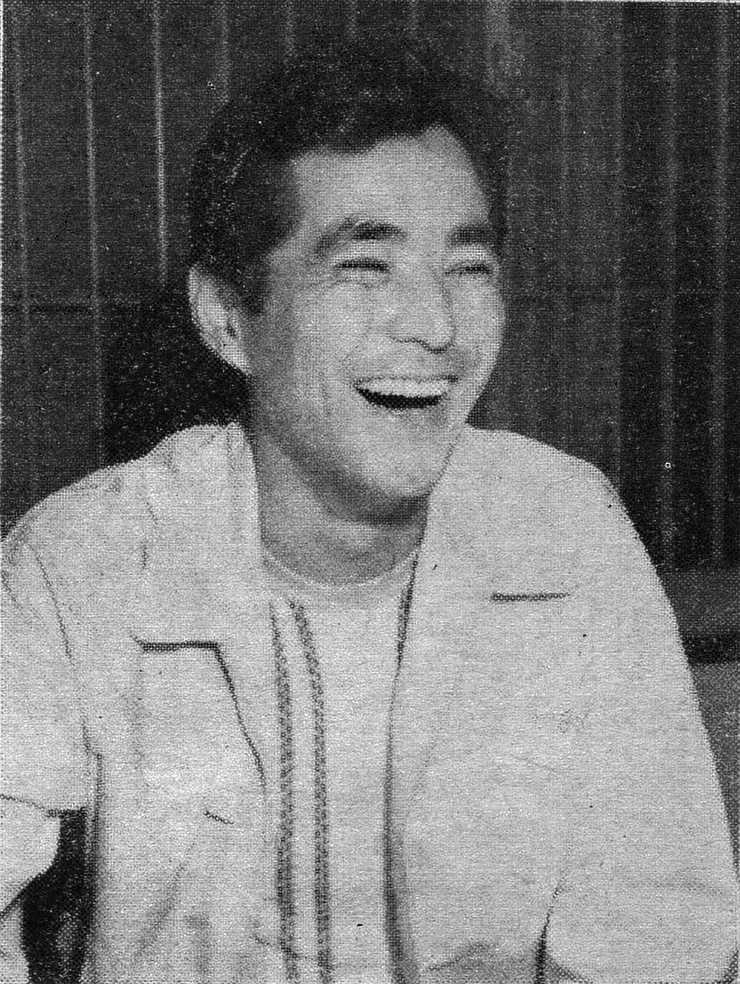
- Tatsuya Mihashi in 1954
- Born: November 2, 1923; Tokyo, Japan
- Died: 15 May 2004 (aged 80); San Francisco, United States
- Occupation: Actor
- Years active: 1944–2004
- Spouse: Kyōko Anzai (m. 1961; died 2002)
- Children: Tadao Mihashi

Tatsuya Mihashi (三橋 達也, Mihashi Tatsuya; November 2, 1923 – May 15, 2004) was a Japanese actor best known internationally for his role as Commander Minoru Genda in the 1970 Japanese-American war epic Tora! Tora! Tora!. In addition, Mihashi was known for his roles in Akira Kurosawa's The Bad Sleep Well, The Human Vapor, Chūshingura: Hana no Maki, Yuki no Maki, High and Low, None but the Brave and the lead role as agent Jiro Kitami in Kokusai himitsu keisatsu: Kagi no kagi, which was reedited in the US as What's Up, Tiger Lily? Mihashi's looks were compared to those of Cary Grant's. He died in 2004 of myocardial infarction.

== Selected filmography ==
=== Film ===
- Nishijin no shimai (1952) - Hiroshi Yasui
- Shino machi o nogarete (1952) - Yosaburo Sugi
- Dôkoku (1952)
- Hawai no yoru (1953)
- Sincerity (1953) - Tôru Shimura
- Jinanbo (1953)
- Shin Tokyo koshin-kyoku (1953) - Kazuo Kiriyama
- Gutei kenkei (1953)
- Tôkyô madamu to Ôsaka fujin (1953) - Mitsuo Itô
- Kyûkon sannin musume (1954) - Kôzô Wakabayashi
- Kimi no na wa: Dai-san-bu (1954)
- Kimi ni chikaishi (1954) - Kunihiko Yada
- Daigaku wa detakeredo (1955)
- Ai no onimotsu (1955)
- Till We Meet Again (1955) - Kappei Ohnuki
- The Heart (1955) - Kaji
- Ginza 24 chou (1955) - Kan Mimurodo - Konî
- Haha naki ko (1955) - Sugimoto, policeman
- The Burmese Harp (1956) - Defense Commander
- The Balloon (1956) - Keikichi Murakami
- Hi no tori (1956)
- Suzaki Paradise: Red Light (1956) - Yoshiji, Tsutae's husband
- Waga machi (1956)
- Natsu no arashi (1956) - Keiji Akimoto
- Ueru tamashii (1956) - Retsu Tachibana
- Zoku ueru tamashii (1956) - Retsu Tachibana
- Otemba san'nin shimai: Odoru taiyô (1957) - Shintarô Taki
- Fukushû wa dare ga yaru (1957) - Yûkichi Ono / Yûzô Ôkawa
- Muhô ichidai (1957) - Kanta Waniguchi
- Sono yoru no himegoto (1957) - Yonosuke Miyamoto
- Shori-sha (1957)
- Kekkon no subete (1958)
- Onna de aru koto (1958) - Goro
- Gurama-to no yuwaku (1959) - Urumeru
- Submarine I-57 Will Not Surrender (1959)
- Kaoyaku to bakudan musume (1959) - Kenji Ôta
- Samurai to oneechan (1960) - Takusan Mô
- Dâisan hâtobanô kêtto (1960) - Detective Yoneyama
- Storm Over the Pacific (1960)
- Robo no ishi (1960) - Tsugino
- Yoru no nagare (1960)
- The Bad Sleep Well (1960) - Tatsuo Iwabuchi
- 'Akasaka no shimai' yori: yoru no hada (1960) - Tôzô Nakahira
- The Human Vapor (1960) - Detective Okamoto
- Sararîman Chûshingura (1960) - Sadagoro
- Ankokugai no dankon (1961) - Azuma, police detective
- Ginza no koibitotachi (1961)
- Zoku sararîman Chûshingura (1961) - Sadagoro
- Playboy President (1961) - Honda
- Ai to honoho to (1961) - Izaki
- Dangai no ketto (1961)
- Procurer of Hell (1961) - Osamu Tobe
- Kaei (1961)
- Witness Killed (1961) - Jiro
- Ai no uzu shio (1962)
- Onna no za (1962) - Hashimoto Masaaki, Michiko no otto
- Doburoku no Tatsu (1962) - Shaguma the Foreman
- Chushingura (1962) - Yasubei Horibe
- Ankokugai no kiba (1962)
- Attack Squadron! (1963)
- High and Low (1963) - Kawanishi - Gondo's Secretary
- Minami no shima ni yuki ga furu (1963)
- Legacy of the 500,000 (1963) - Captain Keigo Gunji
- Dokuritsu kikanjûtai imada shagekichu (1963)
- Kokusai himitsu keisatsu: shirei dai hachigo (1963) - Jiro Kitami
- Norainu sakusen (1963)
- Kokusai himitsu keisatsu: Tora no kiba (1964) - Jiro Kitami
- Kyô mo ware ôzora ni ari (1964)
- Zoku wakai kisetsu (1964)
- Jigoku sakusen (1964)
- Kokusai himitsu keisatsu: Kayaku no taru (1964) - Jiro Kitami
- Danchi: Nanatsu no taizai (1964) - Sôhei Kimura
- None But the Brave (1965) - Lt. Kuroki
- Ankokugai gekitotsu sakusen (1965) - Taro
- Kokusai himitsu keisatsu: Kagi no kagi (1965) - Jiro Kitami
- The Stranger Within a Woman (1966) - Ryukichi Sugimoto
- Kiganjô no bôken (1966) - The King
- Doto ichiman kairi (1966) - Isaku Yano
- The Killing Bottle (1967) - Jiro Kitami
- Sasaki Kojiro (1967) - Jubee Minamiya
- Shin Abashiri Bangaichi (1968) - Isamu Gunji
- Yaju no fukkatsu (1969)
- Nippon dabi katsukyu (1970)
- The Militarists (1970) - Takijirō Ōnishi
- Tora! Tora! Tora! (1970) - Commander Minoru Genda
- Shin abashiri bangaichi: Arashi yobu shiretoko-misaki (1971)
- Kindaichi Kosuke no boken (1979)
- Harukanaru sôro (1980) - Risaburo Oshima
- Imperial Navy (1981)
- Rokumeikan (1986) - Hirobumi Ito
- Wasurerarenu hitobito (2000) - Kijima
- Dolls (2002) - Hiro, the Boss
- Casshern (2004) - Dr. Furoi (final film role)

=== Television ===
- Kyotaro Nishimura Travel Mystery (1981-1999) - Inspector Totsugawa
- Manten (2002-2003)
