= Rengō Kantai (disambiguation) =

Combined Fleet (聯合艦隊, Rengō Kantai) was the main sea-going component of the Imperial Japanese Navy.

Rengō Kantai may also refer to:

- Imperial Navy (film), Japanese title Rengō Kantai, a 1981 Japanese film about Isoroku Yamamoto

== See also ==
- Rengō Kantai Shirei Chōkan: Yamamoto Isoroku, a 1968 film about Isoroku Yamamoto
- Rengō Kantai Shirei Chōkan: Yamamoto Isoroku (2011 film), a Japanese film about Isoroku Yamamoto
