= Misa Uehara =

Japanese actress

- 上原 美佐
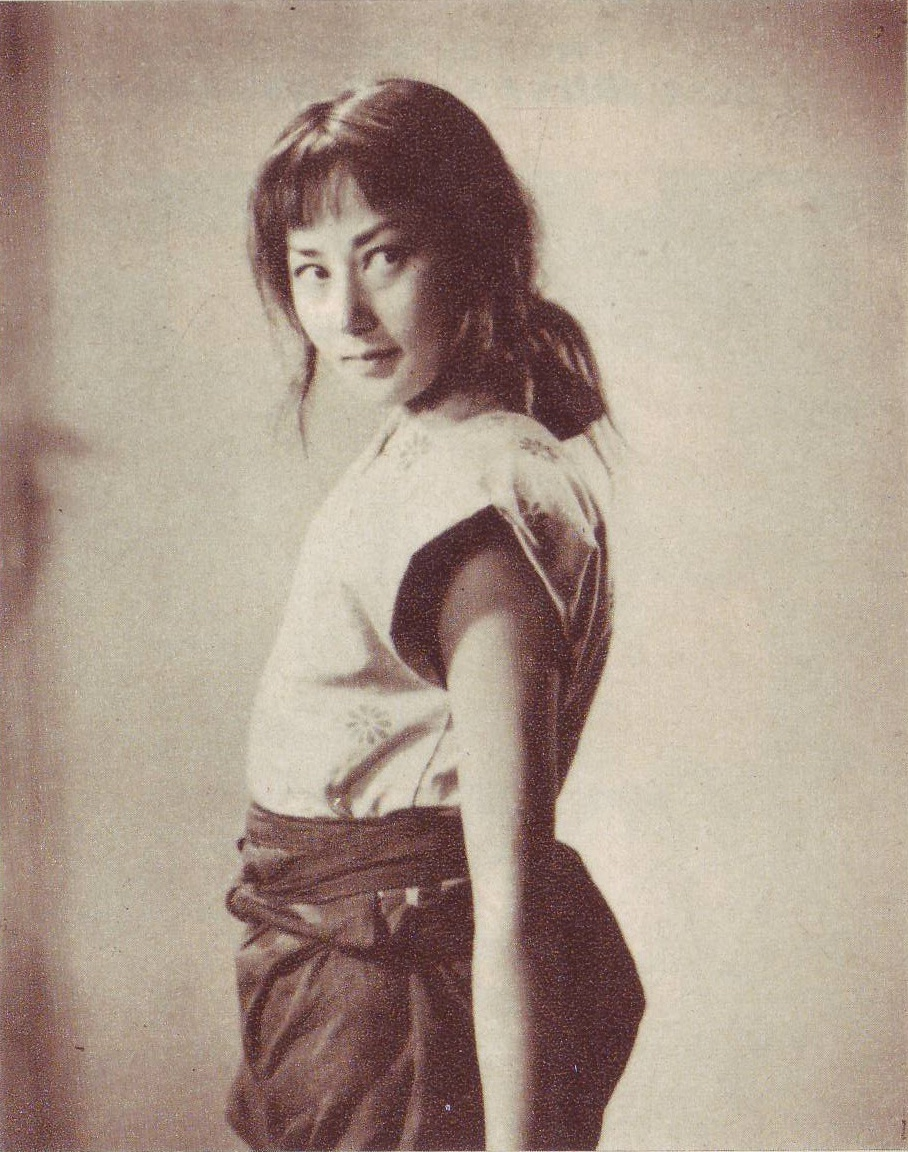
- Uehara in 1957
- Born: 上原 美佐子 (Misako Uehara); March 26, 1937; Fukuoka, Fukuoka Prefecture, Japan
- Died: 2003 (aged 65–66)
- Occupation: Actress
- Years active: 1958–60

Misa Uehara (上原美佐, Uehara Misa) (born Misako Uehara; 26 March 1937 – 2003) was a Japanese actress. She appeared in a few Japanese films from the late 1950s, most notably starring as Princess Yuki in Akira Kurosawa's The Hidden Fortress. Following a brief career, she left acting to raise a family.

== Filmography ==
| Year | Title | Role | Notes |
|---|---|---|---|
| 1958 | The Hidden Fortress | Princess Yuki | |
| 1959 | Daigaku no nijuhachin | | |
| 1959 | Sengoku gunto-den | Princess Koyuki | |
| 1959 | Aruhi watashi wa | Yuriko Shiroyama | |
| 1959 | Dokuritsu gurentai | Bandit Chieftain's Sister | |
| 1959 | The Birth of Japan | Princess Kushinada | |
| 1960 | Gendai Salaryman - Ren'ai bushidô | Setsuko Sonoyama | |
| 1960 | Storm Over the Pacific | Keiko | |
| 1960 | Daigaku no sanzokutachi | Oshime | |
