= Fred Sadoff =

American actor (1926–1994)

- Fred Sadoff in Magnum, P.I. 1987
- Born: Frederick Edward Sadoff; October 21, 1926; California, U.S.
- Died: May 6, 1994 (aged 67); Los Angeles, California, U.S.
- Occupation: Actor
- Years active: 1949–1990

Frederick Edward Sadoff (October 21, 1926 – May 6, 1994) was an American film, stage and television actor.

== Early years ==
Frederick Edward Sadoff was born on October 21, 1926, in California to Russian-Jewish parents Bertha (née Leib) and Henry Sadoff. He had two older brothers, Sidney and Robert.

== Career ==
Sadoff began working in show business as a teenager, when he performed with stock theater companies. His Broadway debut came in the musical South Pacific (1949). He was a founding member and a life member of The Actors Studio, Sadoff also appeared in Camino Real and Wish You Were Here, among other Broadway productions.

Sadoff moved to London to form a production company with Sir Michael Redgrave under the name F.E.S. Plays, Ltd., which presented works including The Importance of Being Oscar which had a short run on Broadway in 1961. While in England, he also worked as a director for the BBC and Rediffusion. In 1958 he became the first American to be assistant director for the Shakespeare Memorial Theater in Stratford on Avon.

Eventually returning to the United States, he found success as an actor in The Poseidon Adventure in 1972 when he was cast as Linarcos, the company representative who ordered Captain Harrison (Leslie Nielsen) full ahead. He also acted in other films, including Papillon (1973), Cinderella Liberty (1973) and The Terminal Man (1974).

On television, he appeared in guest roles on such series as Quincy, M.E., The Streets of San Francisco (in 9 episodes), Barney Miller (in 6 episodes), Barnaby Jones (in 3 episodes), The Rockford Files (in 2 episodes) and Buck Rogers in the 25th Century. He also acted in several soap operas, including Ryan's Hope, All My Children and Days of Our Lives.

== Death ==
Sadoff died of AIDS on May 6, 1994 at his Los Angeles home, aged 68.

== Filmography ==
Year	Title	Role	Notes
1952	Viva Zapata!	Soldier	Uncredited
1957	Appointment with a Shadow		Uncredited
1958	The Quiet American	Dominguez	
1972	The Poseidon Adventure	Linarcos	
1973	Marco	Niccolo Polo	
1973	Papillon	Deputy Warden	
1973	Cinderella Liberty	Dr. Osgood	
1974	The Terminal Man	Police Doctor	
