= Admiral Yamamoto (film) =

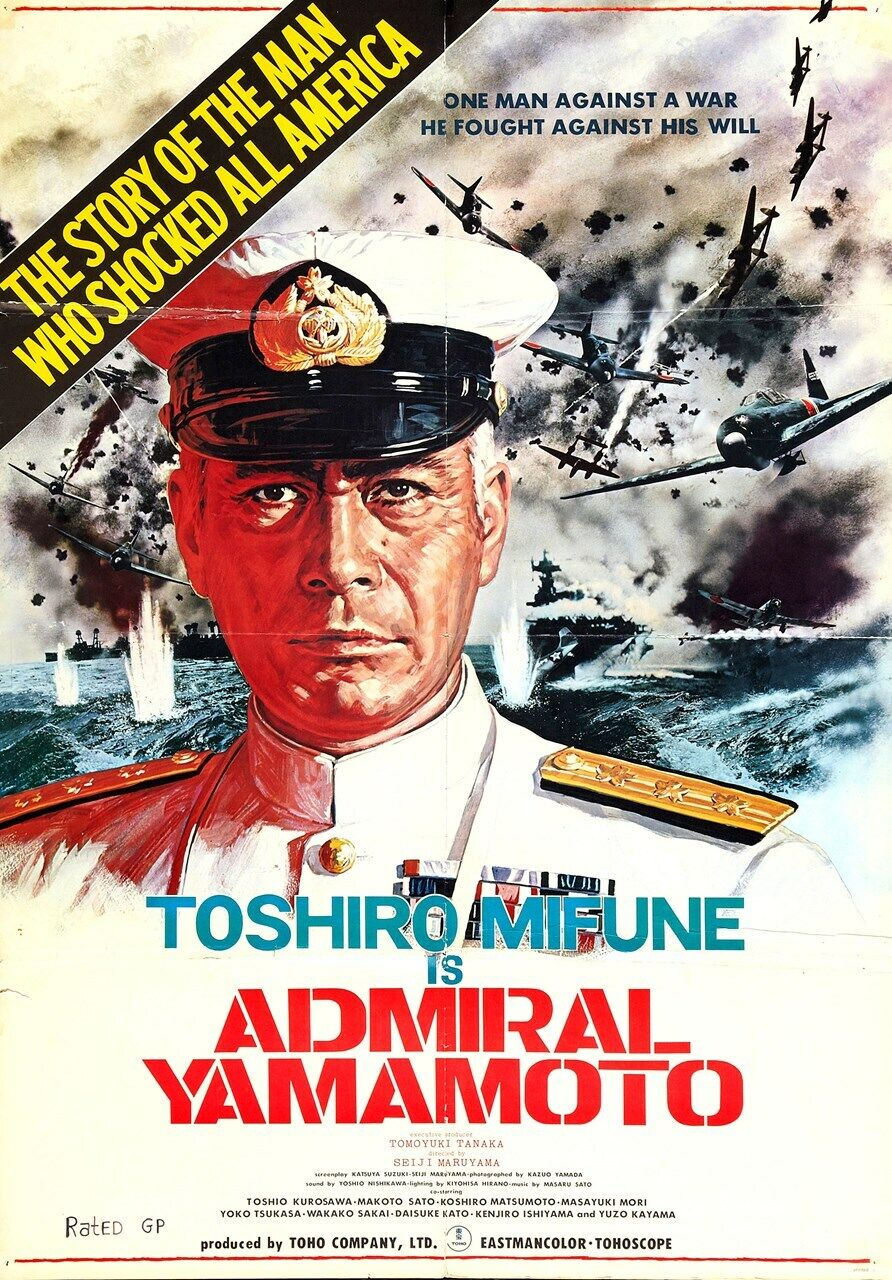
- International theatrical release poster

Japanese name
- Kanji: 連合艦隊司令長官 山本五十六
Transcriptions
- Revised Hepburn: Rengō Kantai Shirei Chōkan Yamamoto Isoroku
- Directed by: Seiji Maruyama; Eiji Tsuburaya (special effects)
- Written by: Katsuya Susaki; Seiji Maruyama
- Produced by: Tomoyuki Tanaka
- Starring: Toshiro Mifune
- Cinematography: Kazuo Yamada; Motoyoshi Tomioka (special effects); Yōichi Manoda (special effects)
- Edited by: Ryōhei Fujii
- Music by: Masaru Sato
- Production company: Toho
- Distributed by: Toho
- Release date: August 14, 1968 (Japan)
- Running time: 130 minutes
- Country: Japan
- Language: Japanese
- Budget: ¥300 million
- Box office: ¥400 million

Admiral Yamamoto (Japanese: 連合艦隊司令長官 山本五十六, Hepburn: Rengō Kantai Shirei Chōkan Yamamoto Isoroku; lit. 'Isoroku Yamamoto: Commander-in-Chief of the Combined Fleet') ia a 1968 Japanese epic war film directed by Seiji Maruyama, with special effects by Eiji Tsuburaya. Produced and distributed by Toho, it is the second film in the 8.15 series, after Japan's Longest Day (1967), with Battle of the Japan Sea following in 1969, The Militarists following in 1970, and Battle of Okinawa following in 1971. The film stars Toshiro Mifune as Admiral Isoroku Yamamoto, the commander-in-chief of the Combined Fleet during World War II.

== Plot ==
In 1939 (Showa 14), as momentum grew in Japan to upgrade the Anti-Comintern Pact with Germany into the Tripartite Pact involving Germany, Italy, and Japan, a peculiar man boarded a ferry in Nagaoka, Niigata Prefecture. The man—who wagered with the boatman that he could reach the opposite bank while standing on his hands—was none other than Isoroku Yamamoto, the Vice Minister of the Navy who was striving to block the Tripartite Pact.

Following the conclusion of the German-Soviet Non-Aggression Pact, the Hiranuma Cabinet (which favored the Tripartite Pact) resigned en masse. A new cabinet led by Mitsumasa Yonai was formed, and Yamamoto shifted from Vice Minister of the Navy to Commander-in-Chief of the Combined Fleet, taking command from his flagship, the Nagato. However, the Yonai Cabinet was also forced to resign by the Army; the Konoe Cabinet was subsequently formed, and the Tripartite Pact was finally concluded. While Yamamoto—despite his reservations—formulated plans for a war with the U.S. aimed at securing a quick peace settlement through an initial victory, air units were conducting peculiar training exercises daily in the skies over Kagoshima.

In 1941 (Showa 16), Japan resolved to go to war with the United States. Disregarding the ongoing diplomatic negotiations, a carrier strike force departed Japan and secretly headed for Hawaii; the order to commence hostilities was finally issued for December 8. Thanks to the rigorous daily training, the surprise attack launched by strike groups from six carriers—led by the Akagi—was successful; however, the U.S. aircraft carriers were not anchored in Hawaii, a fact that weighed heavily on Yamamoto's mind.

As Japan erupted in fervor over the initial victory—moving in a direction contrary to his vision of an early peace—Yamamoto devised a plan to capture Midway Island. His objective was to lure out and decisively destroy the U.S. carrier fleet, thereby creating an opportunity for peace negotiations; this plan was formulated aboard the battleship Yamato, the new flagship of the Combined Fleet. Following the first air raid on the Japanese mainland in April 1942, the Midway operation was adopted, and Yamamoto sortied with the main force of the Combined Fleet. However, the resulting Battle of Midway ended in defeat—with the loss of four aircraft carriers—effectively dashing his hopes for an early peace.

The battle for Guadalcanal, which began in August 1942, intensified; attempts to transport supplies to the island via destroyers to support the Army only resulted in mounting losses, as Japan had lost control of the skies. Acting on Yamamoto's orders to break the deadlock, the battleships Kongō and Haruna bombarded the airfield on Guadalcanal, and the remaining carrier force—including the Shōkaku and Zuikaku—engaged in fierce combat with U.S. carriers. However, due to heavy losses, the plan to capture Guadalcanal was abandoned, and the Combined Fleet shifted its role to supporting the withdrawal of forces from the island. In April 1943, the Combined Fleet headquarters relocated to the Rabaul base; there, it directed Operation I-Go, deploying carrier-based air groups to the area in an effort to regain air superiority over the Solomon Islands. Believing that a certain level of success had been achieved, Yamamoto ordered the carrier-based aircraft back to the home islands and set out to inspect the front lines—unaware that his movements had been anticipated by U.S. forces.

== Cast ==
- Toshiro Mifune as Admiral Isoroku Yamamoto
- Matsumoto Hakuō I as Mitsumasa Yonai
- Masayuki Mori as Fumimaro Konoe
- Eijirō Yanagi as Osami Nagano
- Masao Imafuku as Shunroku Hata
- Toshio Kurosawa as Masatomi Kimura
- Tatsuya Nakadai as narrator
