= The Militarists =

- Film poster
- Directed by: Hiromichi Horikawa
- Screenplay by: Ryozo Kasahara
- Starring: Keiju Kobayashi; Yūzō Kayama; Sō Yamamura; Toshio Kurosawa; Tatsuya Mihashi; Toshiro Mifune
- Narrated by: Kiyoshi Kobayashi
- Cinematography: Kazuo Yamada
- Music by: Riichiro Manabe
- Production company: Toho
- Distributed by: Toho
- Release date: 11 August 1970 (Japan)
- Running time: 133 minutes
- Country: Japan

The Militarists (Japanese: 激動の昭和史 軍閥, Hepburn: Gekido no Showa shi-Gunbatsu) is a 1970 Japanese film directed by Hiromichi Horikawa.

== Release ==
The Militarists had a roadshow release in Japan on 11 August 1970 where it was distributed by Toho. It received general release 12 September 1970 in Japan. The film was Toho's highest grossing release of the year and the second highest grossing Japanese film production in 1970.

The film was released in the United States as Gunbatsu (The Militarists) with English subtitles by Toho International. It was released 10 March 1971.

== Cast ==
- Keiju Kobayashi as Hideki Tōjō
- Yūzō Kayama as Gorō Arai
- Tatsuya Mihashi as Takijirō Ōnishi
- Seiji Miyaguchi as Shigenori Tōgō
- Akira Kubo as Takami
- Ichirō Nakatani as Sano
- Yoshio Tsuchiya as Okabe
- Gorō Mutsumi as Ishida
- Akihiko Hirata as Tomita
- Ryūji Kita as Koshirō Oikawa
- Sachio Sakai as Kitamura
- Kazuo Kitamura as Yamanaka
- Takashi Shimura as Takeda
- Jūkei Fujioka as Nakata
- Shin Kishida as Takakura
- Toshio Kurosawa as Shimagaki
- Masao Shimizu as Saburō Kurusu
- Susumu Fujita as Osami Nagano
- Sō Yamamura (special appearance) as Mitsumasa Yonai
- Toshirō Mifune as Isoroku Yamamoto

== See also ==
- List of Japanese films of 1970
