= Submarine I-57 Will Not Surrender =

- Theatrical release poster
- Directed by: Shūe Matsubayashi
- Written by: Takeshi Kimura; Katsuya Susaki
- Produced by: Shiro Horie
- Cinematography: Taiichi Kankura
- Edited by: Yoshitami Kuroiwa
- Music by: Ikuma Dan
- Production company: Toho
- Distributed by: Toho
- Release date: July 4, 1959 (Japan)
- Running time: 104 minutes
- Country: Japan
- Language: Japanese

Submarine I-57 Will Not Surrender (Japanese: 潜水艦イ-57降伏せず, Hepburn: Sensuikan I-57 kofuku sezu) is a 1959 Japanese war film directed by Shūe Matsubayashi, with special effects by Eiji Tsuburaya.

== Plot ==
During World War II, the commanding officer of a sub reluctantly takes on board two Western diplomats to take them to the Canaries and arrange an armistice. When they get there, Japan has surrendered, but the sub's crew do not know that since its radio has failed. It sends its passengers ashore to go out to face a final battle.

== Cast ==
- Ryō Ikebe
- Tatsuya Mihashi
- Akihiko Hirata
- Akira Kubo
- Susumu Fujita
- Minoru Takada
- Maria Laurenti
- Andrew Hughes
- Hisaya Ito

== See also ==
- Imperial Japanese Navy submarines
- B3 type submarine
