= None but the Brave =

1965 film by Frank Sinatra

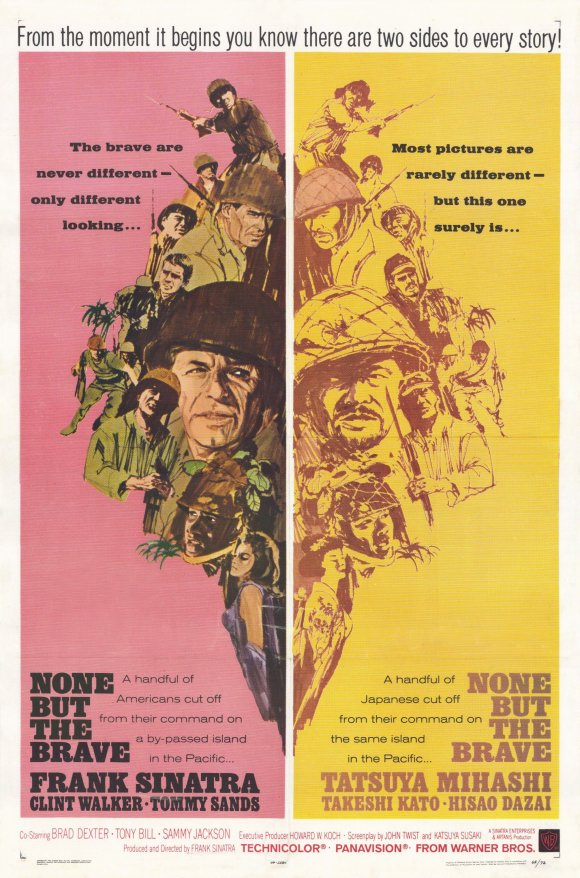
- Theatrical release poster by Howard Terpning
- Directed by: Frank Sinatra; Kazuo Inoue (Note: Inoue is credited as a technical advisor in the American version of the film, but the Honolulu Star-Bulletin, film historian Stuart Galbraith IV, and Japanese sources credit him as co-director, helming the Japanese platoon scenes. Actor Toru Ibuki also said that Inoue "directed the Japanese side, and Frank Sinatra watched". However, Galbraith claims special effects director Eiji Tsuburaya was credited as co-director in the Japanese version.)
- Screenplay by: John Twist; Katsuya Susaki
- Story by: Kikumaru Okuda
- Produced by: Frank Sinatra; Kikumaru Okuda
- Starring: Frank Sinatra; Tatsuya Mihashi; Clint Walker; Takeshi Kato; Tommy Sands; Homare Suguro; Brad Dexter; Kenji Sahara; Tony Bill; Hisao Dazai; Sammy Jackson; Mashahiko Tanimura
- Cinematography: William Daniels; Harold Lipstein
- Edited by: Sam O'Steen
- Music by: John Williams; Kenjiro Hirose
- Production companies: Artanis Productions; Tokyo Eiga
- Distributed by: Warner Bros. Pictures; Toho (Japan)
- Release dates: January 15, 1965 (Japan); February 1965 (U.S.)
- Running time: 105 minutes
- Countries: United States; Japan
- Languages: English; Japanese
- Budget: $4 million
- Box office: $2.5 million (US/Canada rentals)

None but the Brave (Note: Japanese: 勇者のみ, Hepburn: Yūsha Nomi) is a 1965 anti-war film produced and directed by Frank Sinatra from a screenplay by John Twist and Katsuya Susaki. The film stars Sinatra, Clint Walker, Tommy Sands, Brad Dexter, Tony Bill, and Sammy Jackson as U.S. Marines, and Tatsuya Mihashi, Takeshi Kato, Homare Suguro, Hisao Dazai, Kenji Sahara, and Mashahiko Tanimura as Imperial Japanese soldiers. Stranded on the same uninhabited island during the Pacific War, the two opposing platoons are forced to cooperate to survive.

The film was the first American-Japanese co-production to be shot in the United States, and Sinatra's sole directorial effort. Japanese co-producer Kikumaru Okuda conceived the story. Raoul Walsh, who initially planned to direct, collaborated with Twist on the script before selling it to Sinatra in late 1963. Principal photography commenced in April 1964 on the Hawaiian island of Kauaʻi, and wrapped that June at Warner Bros. Studios Burbank, with a $4 million budget. While Sinatra directed most scenes, Kazuo Inoue helmed those featuring only the Japanese cast. During a filming break, Sinatra was saved from drowning by co-star Dexter, enabling production to proceed as scheduled. Special effects, directed by Eiji Tsuburaya, were shot between May and August 1964. John Williams composed the score, with Kenjiro Hirose advising on Japanese music.

None but the Brave was released in Japan on January 15, 1965, and throughout the United States in February 1965, to mixed reviews. Critics were divided over Sinatra's direction, the screenplay, and performances; Sinatra's performance, the Japanese cast, cinematography, special effects, and musical score received praise, while Sands' acting drew criticism. It was among the highest-grossing films of 1965, culminating $2.5 million in North American distributor rentals. In recent years, None but the Brave has been critically re-evaluated and noted as an anti-war film predating late 1960s counterculture cinema.

== Plot ==
During the Pacific Theater of World War II, a platoon of seventeen Japanese soldiers is stationed on an island in the Solomon Archipelago. After American forces bypass their position and a storm destroys their radio, the platoon is stranded. Lieutenant Kuroki maintains discipline as he oversees the construction of a boat for their escape.

One day, an F4U Corsair escorting an R4D Skytrain to Peleliu is intercepted by an A6M Zero. Both fighters engage in a fierce dogfight, destroying each other. The Skytrain crash-lands, killing two aircrew members and stranding nineteen American survivors, including Captain Dennis Bourke, Chief Pharmacist's Mate Francis Maloney, Air Crewman Keller, 2nd Lieutenant Blair, Sergeant Bleeker, and a Marine infantry platoon. Discovering Japanese forces, Blair and Bleeker initially rally the Marines for combat but transfer command to Bourke, who urges restraint. That night, Bourke and Craddock ambush the Japanese investigating the Skytrain, wounding Lance Corporal Hirano before retreating.

The next day, the Americans spot a U.S. Navy warship searching for the lost Skytrain and try to send a smoke signal. A Japanese attack kills a Marine and a Japanese soldier. The warship, mistaking the Americans for Japanese, shells the beach and leaves. Later, Craddock, struggling to lead, tries to capture Japanese Private Okunda, but Okunda's jovial nature leads Craddock to trade with him, providing rare levity for Kuroki. After losing another Marine at a freshwater spring ambush, the Americans attempt to steal the Japanese boat for rescue. The battle destroys the boat and inflicts heavy casualties, deepening the disillusionment of both sides. Another Japanese soldier disarms, seeking peace, but is killed, prompting both sides to retreat. Hirano, desperate over his leg injury, attempts suicide, but is interrupted. Kuroki, determined to save him and tired of loss, negotiates a truce with Bourke for Maloney to amputate Hirano's leg in exchange for resources.

With the truce in effect, the Americans and Japanese split the beach between themselves. They often cross the border to cooperate or spy on each other. The truce is nearly broken when Keller, wary of Japanese intentions, wounds a Japanese soldier who approaches their secret radio post, revealing Keller's defensive instincts. Their standoff is interrupted when a major storm hits the island, destroying their camps. Forced by circumstances, the Americans and Japanese work together to build a flood wall and a shared base, demonstrating a shift from suspicion to cooperation. The next day, Kuroki finds Keller's radio post, which leads him to lose trust in the Americans and fuel his suspicion of potential betrayal. Okunda, who had been trying to provide food for his group, is killed by a shark while fishing, marking the loss of a key provider and affecting group morale.

Keller reestablishes radio contact with the U.S. Navy and arranges a rescue. Kuroki ends the truce after overhearing the plan, while Bourke and Blair suggest surrender. Both sides reluctantly resume hostilities. As USS Walker (DD-517) approaches, the eight remaining Japanese soldiers Banzai charge the eleven Americans, sparking a firefight that leaves only Maloney, Bourke, Blair, Bleeker, and Corporal Ruffino alive. Maloney finds Kuroki's journal and gives it to Bourke, who considers returning it to Kuroki's wife, Keiko. In his final journal narration, Kuroki urges Keiko not to grieve, assuring her their spirits endure beyond death.

Rather than "The End", the movie concludes with the caption "NOBODY EVER WINS".

== Cast ==
=== American platoon ===
- Frank Sinatra as Chief Pharmacist Mate Francis Maloney
- Clint Walker as Capt. Dennis Bourke
- Tommy Sands as 2nd Lt. Blair
- Brad Dexter as Sgt. Bleeker
- Tony Bill as Air Crewman Keller, the radioman
- Sammy Jackson as Cpl. Craddock
- Richard Bakalyan as Cpl. Ruffino
- Rafer Johnson as Pvt. Johnson
- Jimmy Griffin as Pvt. Dexter
- Christopher Dark as Pvt. Searcy
- Don Dorrell as Pvt. Hoxie
- Phil Crosby as Pvt. Magee
- Howie Young as Pvt. Waller
- Roger Ewing as Pvt. Swensholm
- Richard Sinatra as Pvt. Roth

=== Japanese platoon ===
- Tatsuya Mihashi as Lt. Kuroki
- Takeshi Katō as Sgt. Tamura
- Homare Suguro as Lance Cpl. Hirano
- Kenji Sahara as Cpl. Fujimoto
- Mashahiko Tanimura as Lead Pvt. Ando
- Toru Ibuki as Pvt. Arikawa
- Ryucho Shunputei as Pvt. Okunda, the fisherman
- Hisao Dazai as Pvt. Tokumaru, the Buddhist priest
- Susumu Kurobe as Pvt. Goro
- Takashi Inagaki as Pvt. Ishii
- Kenichi Hata as Pvt. Sato

=== Uncredited ===
- Laraine Stephens as Lorie, Bourke's fiancée who was killed in an air raid (seen in a flashback)
- Nami Tamura as Keiko, Kuroki's wife (flashback)
- James E. McLarty as Patrol member
- Joe Gray

== Production ==
=== Development ===
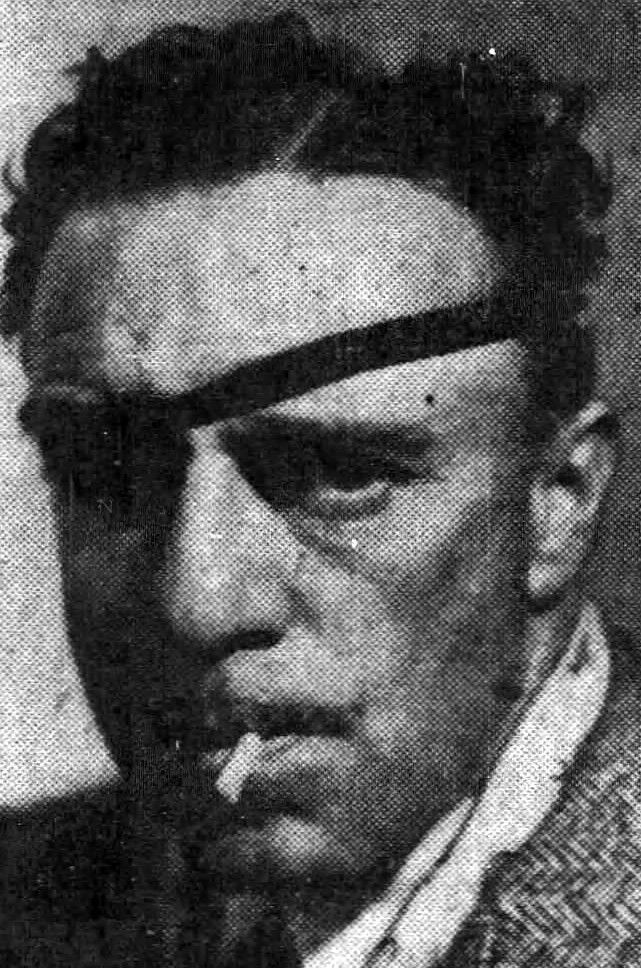
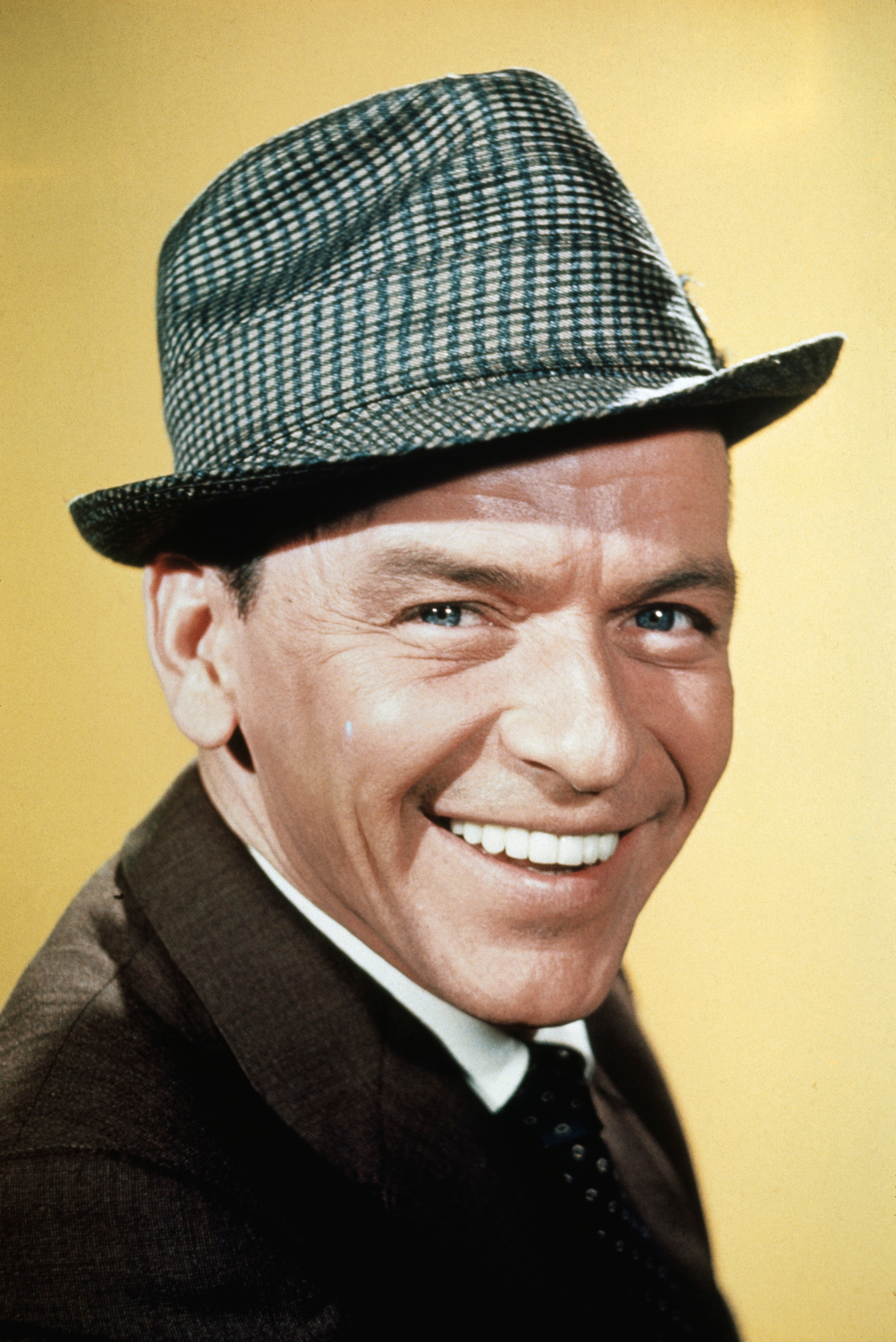
Raoul Walsh (left, pictured c. 1946) was initially set to direct the film in 1963 before Frank Sinatra (pictured in 1961) assumed the role.

None but the Brave was initiated in the early 1960s by aspiring Japanese producer Kikumaru Okuda, who developed the original story and co-produced for Tokyo Eiga. The film's title is taken from John Dryden's 1697 poem, Alexander's Feast, stanza 1: "None but the brave/deserves the fair". The script was co-authored by American screenwriter John Twist and Japanese writer Katsuya Susaki, a surviving kamikaze pilot. Their collaboration aimed to present balanced perspectives from both sides of the World War II conflict.

Filmmaker Raoul Walsh worked on the script with Twist and initially expected he would direct, encouraged by friends in Japan to film there. On September 3, 1963, the Pittsburgh Post-Gazette reported that filming was scheduled to begin in Japan within weeks under Walsh's direction. However, Twist and Walsh ultimately sold the script to Frank Sinatra. In October, Warner Bros. Pictures president Jack L. Warner disclosed that None but the Brave would be the first of three films in a new contract between Warner Bros. and Sinatra's production company. Although None but the Brave marked Walsh's final film involvement, he was no longer scheduled to direct by November and received no credit in the finished film.

Frank Sinatra took a keen interest in the script after discovering it at Warner Bros. and eventually decided to helm the film himself. In February 1964, it was reported that the film would mark Sinatra's directorial debut. He and executive producer Howard W. Koch traveled to Japan that same month to collaborate with Toho, securing Japanese actors and a special effects crew. Koch emphasized that None but the Brave would be the first American film to portray Japanese soldiers sympathetically, and expressed optimism about Sinatra's directorial vision, noting that a successful outcome could lead to Sinatra directing a comedy next. Ultimately, the film was the sixth of nine produced by Sinatra and his sole directorial credit.

=== Casting ===
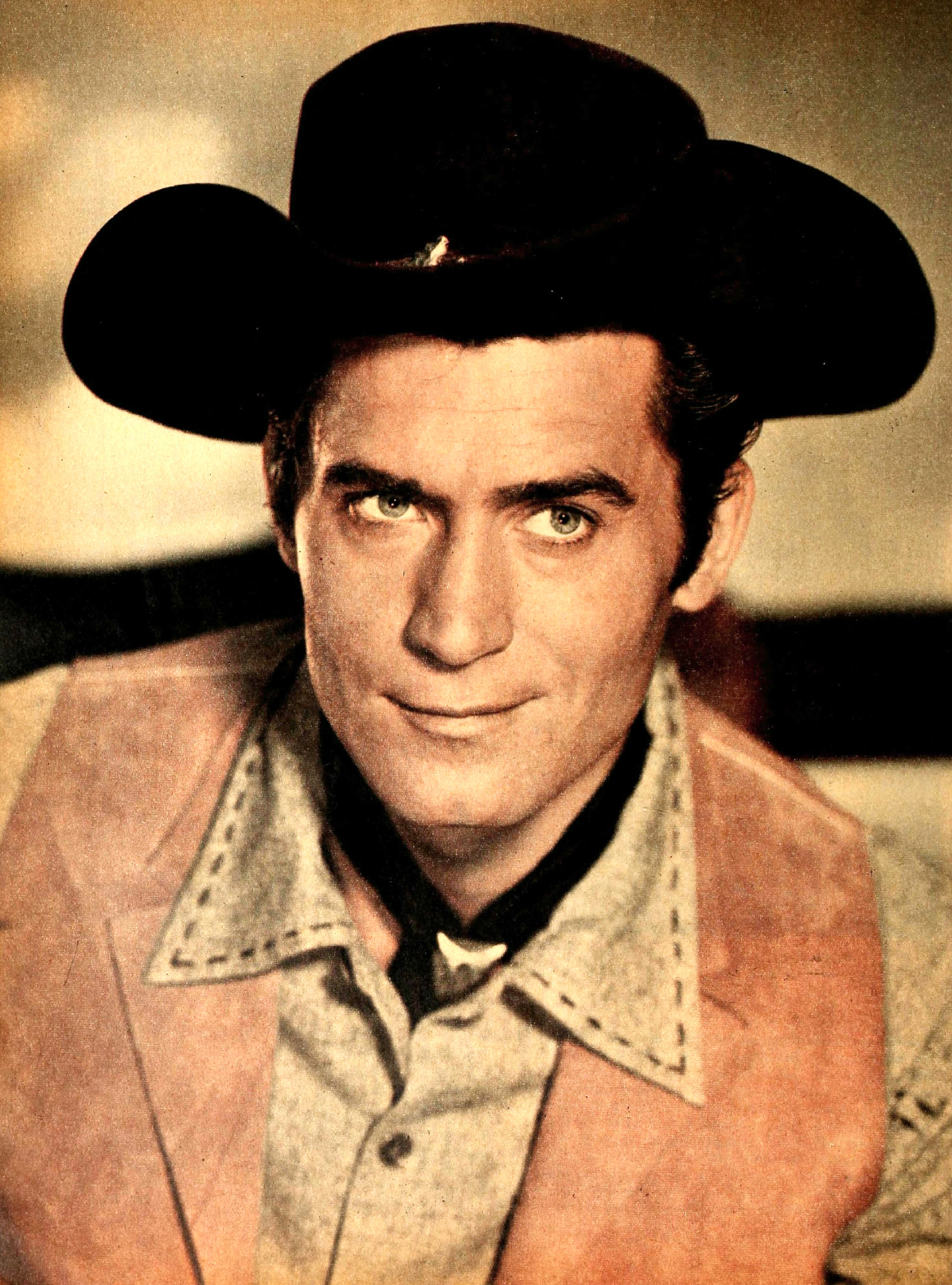
Clint Walker in 1956

In April–May 1963, Clint Walker entered negotiations to star in the film, marking its initial development announcement and signaling his potential return to Warner Bros. after his seven-year contract with the studio expired. When Walsh was to direct, Troy Donahue, who had recently starred in Walsh's A Distant Trumpet (released in 1964), was attached to appear. John Wayne was later reported by The Hollywood Reporter in January 1964 as slated to play Captain Dennis Bourke, but Walker ended up taking on the role. Rock Hudson was also considered for the role.

The American cast featured several actors with prior ties to Sinatra. Frank's cousin, Richard Sinatra, appeared in a minor role as a background soldier. Tommy Sands, who played a supporting role, was Sinatra's son-in-law at the time, married to Sinatra's daughter Nancy. A few actors had previously collaborated with Sinatra: Tony Bill, who portrayed a young soldier, had played the younger brother of Sinatra's character in Come Blow Your Horn (1963), while Richard Bakalyan had co-starred alongside Sinatra in Robin and the 7 Hoods (1964). Newcomer Jimmy Griffin, who later gained fame as a co-founder of the rock band Bread, had signed a recording contract with Sinatra's Reprise Records in 1962. Other notable American cast members included Stephens, making her film debut, and she was one of only two women in the cast. Former Olympian Rafer Johnson was the only African-American actor among the ensemble. Larry Glenn of The New York Times noted Johnson's casting as reflective of Warner Bros.' early 1960s efforts to promote racial diversity in films not explicitly addressing racial issues.

By March 11, 1964, Walker and Sands had secured their roles, and Sinatra was attempting to convince Robert Mitchum to join the cast. Toshiro Mifune signed on, persuaded by Sinatra making Toho a partner on the production; however, Mifune ultimately did not appear in the film. Al Silvani was also cast in the film as a U.S. Marine and present during the Hawaii shoot.

Sinatra traveled to Japan to cast Japanese actors. Toru Ibuki recounted meeting Sinatra at the Hotel Okura, also being hired as one of Sinatra's bodyguards, working for around five years. Mihashi, making his Hollywood debut, had joined the cast by March 18. Casting had been completed by April 16, 1964.

=== Pre-production ===
On February 24, 1964, Frank Sinatra arrived in Honolulu, en route to Japan to cast Japanese actors, and announced filming would begin on either the Hawaiian Islands of Maui or Kauaʻi on April 15. Sinatra, Koch, and William Daniels were scheduled to travel to Maui for location scouting on March 1. After ten days of searching across Hawaii, the production team chose Pilaa Beach on Kauaʻi. However, heavy rainfall during pre-production damaged the beach, forcing the team to revise their filming plans.

On March 11, Sinatra moved to Warner Bros. Studios to take on his role as special assistant to Jack L. Warner, while finalizing preparations for None but the Brave. Having recently returned from talks with Toho in Tokyo, he set filming to start on April 21, with three weeks of location shooting in Hawaii, followed by studio work in Burbank. A dedicated office for his production team was being built at the studio at that time, set for completion by April 30.

On March 12, the production faced delays due to the kidnapping trial of Sinatra's son, pushing the start date to later in April. Despite these setbacks, with many technicians and actors already on payroll, Sinatra pressed forward with preparations. At that time, according to Louella Parsons, he was focused on casting an unknown actress to star opposite him, requiring extensive interviews and screen tests.

=== Filming ===
==== Principal photography ====
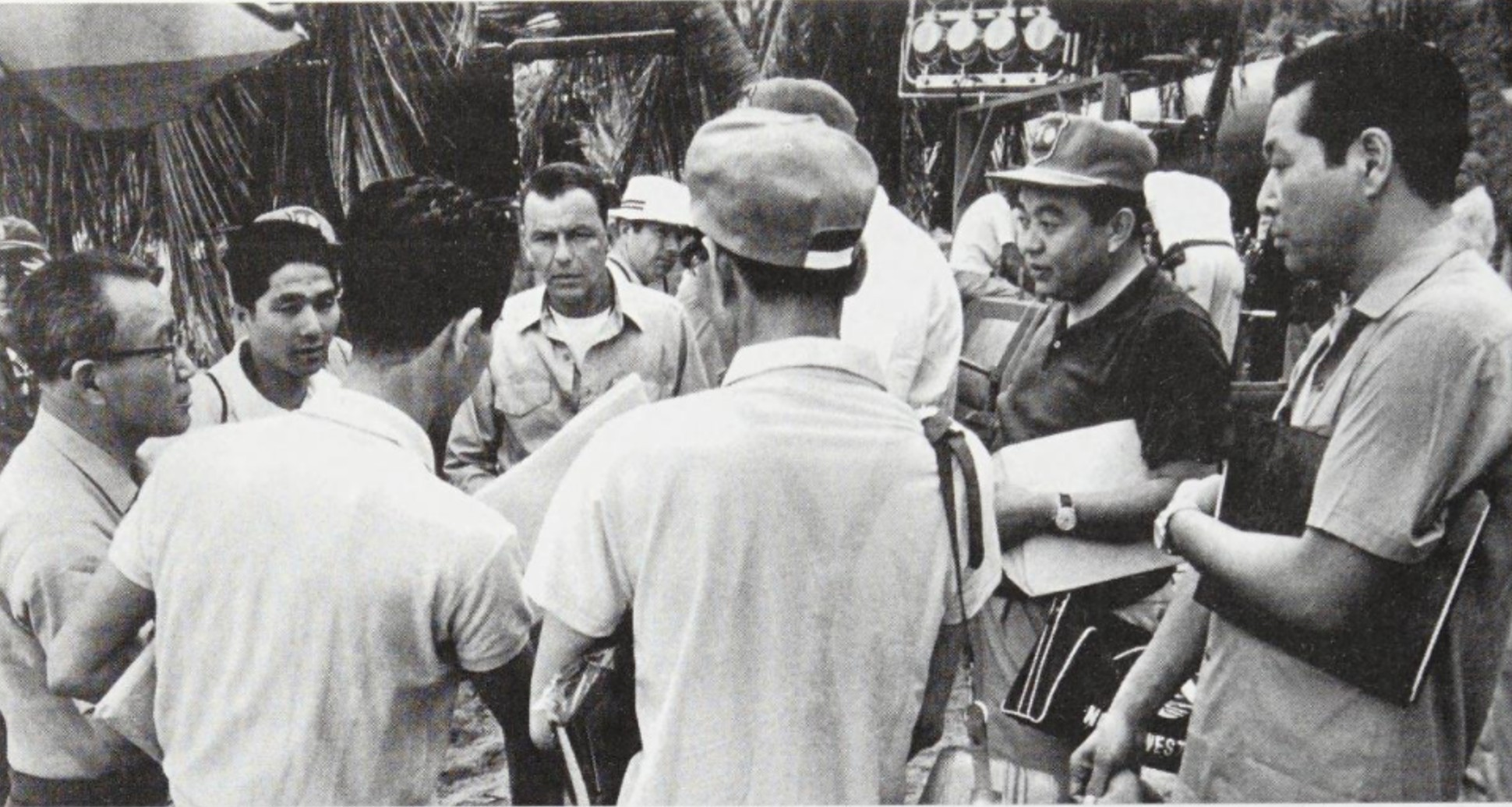
Sinatra (center) talking with Eiji Tsuburaya (far left, wearing glasses) and other Japanese crew members on location in Hawaii.

Principal photography began on April 27, 1964, on Kauaʻi, with the scene of the American platoon evacuating their crashed plane filmed on a beach near Kīlauea. The day's shoot was scheduled to start at 9 a.m., and the Japanese cast and crew arrived by 8:30 a.m., but director Frank Sinatra arrived late, landing by helicopter on the beach. The initial budget was reported as US$3 million, but the final budget was reported as $4 million. Sinatra had arrived in Hawaii on April 23, via private plane and stayed at a retreat across from Coco Palms Resort for five weeks, with 61 additional rooms rented for the cast and crew. Approximately 75% of the film was shot on location on Kauaʻi.

None but the Brave was the first American-Japanese co-production filmed in the United States. It was co-produced by Tokyo Eiga (a Toho subsidiary) and Sinatra's Artanis Productions, with Warner Bros. providing financing. 24 Japanese crew members participated in the Hawaii shoot. Producer Okuda viewed the project as an opportunity to foster international collaborations between Japanese and American film industries. During production, Okuda met James Bond producers Harry Saltzman and Albert R. Broccoli, leading to his involvement in You Only Live Twice (1967). By July 1964, Okuda had signed Jayne Mansfield for a Japan-based film and was developing a project for Marlon Brando. Sinatra invited the Japanese cast and crew to Las Vegas post-filming, but Toho declined due to safety concerns. This led Okuda to ultimately establish a connection with Caesars Palace through Sinatra; Okuda was later arrested in 1975 for extorting participants in Las Vegas gambling tours he organized.

The director of photography was Harold Lipstein, a veteran who had previously worked with Sinatra on Pal Joey (1957). Warner Bros. camera chief William Daniels was credited as an associate producer, and sources conflict on whether he was also involved in the cinematography. The film was shot in Technicolor and Panavision.

A set for the film was constructed at Pilaa Bay for the Japanese platoon's base, built by 12 Japanese technicians and set decorator Joe Butterworth. Features included a mess table used in the amputation scene, a sweet potato garden, a clothesline with authentic Japanese pillows, and a privy. U.S.-sourced guns and bayonets were used due to Japanese export restrictions.

Howie Young, who was making his film debut, quickly gained a reputation on set for his rugged persona and ongoing struggles with alcoholism. During production, he narrowly avoided an accident while riding a rented motorcycle, after which Koch ordered him not to use another motorcycle until filming wrapped. At the wrap party for the Hawaiian shoot aboard Sinatra's yacht, a heavily intoxicated Young allegedly grabbed Sinatra and threw him overboard into the Pacific, dislodging Sinatra's toupée in the process, according to accounts from Young's teammate and friend Jim McKenny; Sinatra's associates then beat Young and dumped him onto a nearby beach, leaving him with $200 and amnesia of the incident.

Additional filming took place at Warner Bros. Studios Burbank and Japan, completed by late June. During this period, Sinatra balanced shooting with preparations for his album It Might as Well Be Swing (1964). The album's arranger Quincy Jones recalled: "I moved in at Warner Bros. in Dean Martin's dressing room while Frank was next door, shooting the picture every day and editing and so forth. So I used to stay there, I locked myself there for a week and just kept writing. I fell asleep late Sunday night, and then on Monday morning I looked up and there's Frank in a military uniform [costume from the film], asking me how I wanted my eggs. He was cooking breakfast!"

==== Direction ====
Sinatra showed a forbearing style as a director, in contrast to his acting approach, which typically involved requesting only one take and displaying impatience. The film was Sinatra's first and only directing credit, a role he had sought for about five years. However, some filmmakers who directed him previously challenged the claim that it was his true directing debut. One noted that Sinatra rarely dictated how scenes were filmed but often made suggestions, adding, "A Sinatra suggestion is more than a suggestion. It's an implied command." Some Sinatra biographers also claim Gordon Douglas, who directed Sinatra's previous film Robin and the 7 Hoods, aided Sinatra or co-directed None but the Brave, albeit uncredited. According to Walker, however, Sinatra directed part of the film before executive producer Howard W. Koch took over, as Sinatra seemed to lose interest.

During filming, Sinatra said directing was his favorite medium and considered it and From Here to Eternity (1953) turning points in my film career, noting that were both filmed in Hawaii. He was drawn to the film's anti-war narrative, which aligned with his strong opposition to war. He noted that the story's poignant, small-scale focus—avoiding large battle scenes—suited his first directorial effort.

Japanese filmmaker Kazuo Inoue directed the scenes featuring only Japanese soldiers on Sinatra’s behalf, ensuring alignment with cultural sensitivities while Sinatra observed. He is credited as a technical advisor in the American version of the film, but the Honolulu Star-Bulletin, film historian Stuart Galbraith IV, and Japanese sources credit him as co-director.

==== Near-drowning incident ====
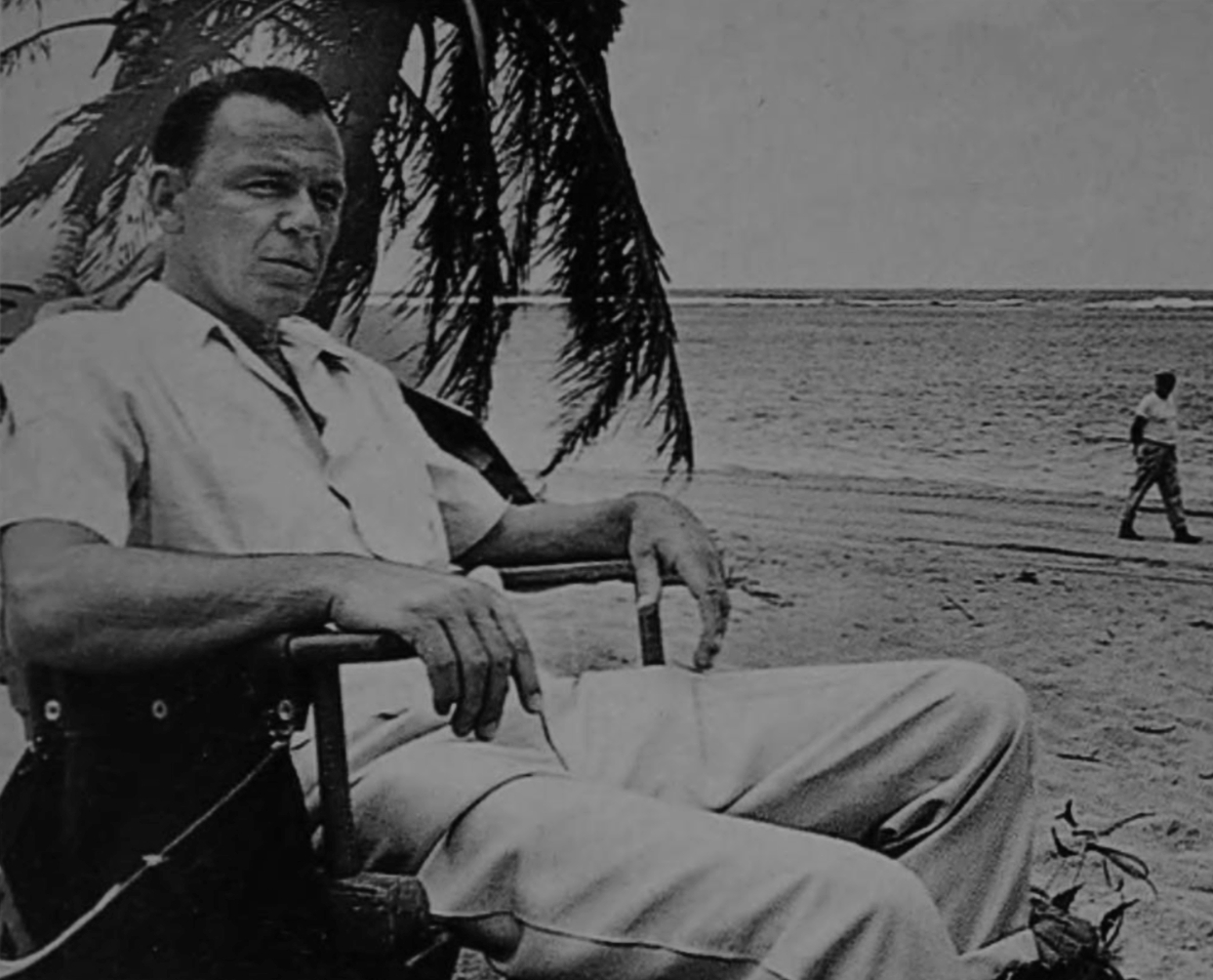
Sinatra on the beach near where he almost drowned a few days earlier

During a filming break on May 10, 1964, Sinatra hosted a party at his rented beachfront house in Wailua, Kauaʻi County, Hawaii. Attendees included Howard Koch and his wife Ruth, Brad Dexter, Richard Bakalyan, Jilly Rizzo, and Sinatra's valet, George Jacobs. Most guests headed to the beach, while Howard remained inside reviewing the schedule. Ruth, disregarding warnings about a strong undertow, swam in the surf in front of the house. Noticing this, Sinatra entered the water after her to shield her, but both were quickly swept up by a rip current. Brad Dexter and others then plunged into the water to rescue Sinatra and Ruth. Sinatra biographer James Kaplan remarked that the incident provoked a "Rashomon-like array of recollections" among observers and participants, with disputes over who exactly rescued Sinatra and how dire the ordeal was; nevertheless, most accounts acknowledge that Dexter was among those who saved the singer's life.

Jacobs called the offshore waters shallow with low danger, noting a local surfer on a board quickly aided them with Dexter. Nancy Sinatra, though not an eyewitness, credited locals with saving her father, omitting Dexter. Dexter told biographer Kitty Kelley he spotted the riptide and heard guest Murray Wolf shout about Sinatra struggling. He reached Ruth first, who urged him to save Sinatra, and then aided Sinatra alongside a surfer. During the incident, Sinatra suffered from hypoxia and, according to Dexter, expressed despair, repeatedly saying, "I'm going to die [...] Please take care of my kids." He described slapping Sinatra and verbally challenging him to fight for his life, noting that Sinatra appeared "limp and lifeless" and lacked the will to survive. Dexter recalled thinking amid the ordeal of the irony of Sinatra's near-death experience, given his close ties to John F. Kennedy, who had recently died. After rescuing Sinatra, Dexter noted that he was left alone in the water, exhausted, and struggled to reach the shore, an experience that continued to frighten him. News reports also conflicted: UPI described a huge wave, while the Associated Press noted Dexter swam to Sinatra but required surfers to complete the rescue, aligning with Dexter’s account.

According to The Kauaʻi Movie Book author Chris Cook, as the drama unfolded, a large wave carried Ruth around 75 yards offshore, with Sinatra in pursuit; a second wave returned her near shore but pulled Sinatra around 200 yards out. She called for help. Sinatra struggled for 20 minutes, his face turning blue; Kapaʻa Fire Lieutenant George Keawe said five more minutes could have been fatal. According to Cook, rescuers included neighbor A. O. Giles on a surfboard, County Supervisor Louis Gonsalves, Coco Palms manager Harold Jim, an ambulance from Wilcox Memorial Hospital, and a fire team; Dexter and locals were key. Waves stalled them 150 feet (46 m) offshore until Keawe's rope pulled them in; a firefighter saved Ruth.

After the rescue, according to Time magazine, Sinatra was unconscious by the time he had been brought back to shore, and got artificial respiration and was stretchered home, diagnosed as exhausted but okay. He rested the rest of the day and filming resumed at Pīlaʻa Beach the next. Cook added that Nancy made Sinatra eggs and peppers later on the day of the incident; they watched TV until he slept. Following his doctor's medical advice to rest after the incident, Frank Sinatra took a day off, with Howard Koch directing the film on his behalf on May 11, 1964; Sinatra resumed directing on May 12. By May 13, the Kauaʻi filming was reported to be two weeks ahead of schedule, originally planned to conclude there in early June but now expected to wrap by May 21.

The incident was widely publicized internationally, with several inquiries including a phone call from actor Yul Brynner. On May 25, Dexter and six Kauaʻi locals involved in saving Sinatra's life were each awarded a Red Cross medal for their bravery. Sinatra later downplayed the near-drowning publicly, though privately he acknowledged how close he came to death. To show his gratitude, he donated money to Kauaʻi County officials for a new lifeboat and grew close to Dexter, later securing him a significant role in his next film Von Ryan's Express (1965). Sinatra suffered nightmares about the incident thereafter, and he later distanced Dexter after briefly favoring him.

==== Special effects ====
The film's special effects were crafted by Toho's special effects unit under the direction of Eiji Tsuburaya. Sinatra was impressed by Tsuburaya's innovative work on the disaster film The Last War (1961). During a visit for production meetings at Toho's headquarters, he viewed a screening of that film and personally enlisted Tsuburaya for None but the Brave.

Immediately after completing a sequence for the American version of Mothra vs. Godzilla (1964), Tsuburaya traveled to Hawaii to consult with Sinatra and the production crew on the film's dogfight and tsunami sequences. To ensure accuracy in recreating the environment in miniature, he photographed the Hawaiian coastline and collected samples of local soil and foliage, as he found the environment subtly differed from Japan's coastal landscapes.

While working on the film's plane crash scene on Kauaʻi, Tsuburaya received a visit from collaborator Ishirō Honda. Tsuburaya, struggling to cast the lead for his upcoming series Unbalance, was convinced by Honda to offer the role to Kenji Sahara (appearing in the film). Sahara accepted, starring in the series which premiered in January 1966 as Ultra Q.

Due to Tsuburaya's packed schedule, special effects photography was deferred to Toho. It began in May 1964, paused in June for work on Dogora, and resumed on August 5, concluding on August 20. The island panoramas, aerial dogfights, plane crash, storm, and tsunami were all completed in this period. The tsunami was shot in one take using a large miniature coastline and a surge of water released down a chute.

=== Music ===
Sinatra's frequent collaborators Sammy Cahn and Jimmy Van Heusen were initially commissioned to score the film, as reported in June 1964. However, Morris Stoloff, a friend of Sinatra's and music director at Reprise Records, recommended John Williams (then being billed as Johnny Williams), a then-emerging composer, to compose the score instead. Williams joined the project in September 1964, ultimately delivering his most ambitious work yet, which marked one of his earliest major feature film scores. This was also his first collaboration with Sinatra; they later worked together on a few other projects, including a fundraising fete for the Memorial Sloan Kettering Cancer Center.

Drawing from his TV work on shows like Alcoa Premiere (1961–1963) and Kraft Suspense Theatre (1963–1965), Williams crafted a score blending dramatic tension with subtle suspense. The main theme, tied to the American platoon, features a bold horn fanfare with a complex descending counterline, influenced by André Previn. The Japanese music advisor, Kenjiro Hirose, also helped incorporate ethnic elements to reflect the Japanese soldiers' perspective, and is credited as co-composer by some sources. For Kuroki and the Japanese soldiers, a serene flute melody and two authentic Japanese tunes, whistled and sung, add cultural depth. Using a Western orchestra, the score subtly evokes Japanese sounds via woodwinds and percussion.

A tie-in song not featured in the film, titled "None But the Brave", with music by Williams and lyrics by Don Wolf, was released as a promotional single by Reprise Records in 1965, including versions with The Jack Halloran Singers and a Japanese rendition by Frank Nagai. A soundtrack album was released by Film Score Monthly in 2009, limited to 3,000 copies, with a remix by Mike McDonald and liner notes by Jeff Eldridge.

== Themes ==
None but the Brave is regarded as an anti-war film reflecting Sinatra's pacifist and egalitarian views. Sinatra himself considered the film anti-war. The film's closing intertitle, reading "Nobody ever wins" instead of the common "The End", notably emphasizes its anti-war theme. In a 1964 interview shortly before production began, Sinatra stated: "Sure, I'm against war and I hope we never have another one ... But in this film I want to show that men in war are not animalistic. It is a Japanese point of view as well as our [American] point of view." Koch added that the film would intend to show not all Japanese during the war acted like kamikaze.

== Release ==
=== Marketing and promotion ===
None but the Brave had its first private screening at the Screen Directors Guild Auditorium in Los Angeles on December 11, 1964, receiving applause. The cast and crew attended, but Sinatra's attendance is unclear. He performed earlier that night at the Los Angeles Music Center, substituting for Nat King Cole, and sources differ on whether he arrived at the screening in time. The film later had several trade show screenings in Pittsburgh, Philadelphia, Albany, New York, Washington, D.C., among other locations, on December 29. Another advance, invitational showing occurred at the Florida Theatre in Jacksonville, Florida, run by a Warner Bros. manager, Carrol Ogburn.

Warner Bros. launched an extensive marketing campaign for the film, notable for being the studio's first release to use color television commercials. The success of its color TV advertisements led Warner Bros. to employ similar ones for Cheyenne Autumn and other major films thereafter. Additionally, a color behind-the-scenes trailer was distributed to theaters for a four-week promotional run. The campaign featured several tie-ins, including a comic book adaptation published by Dell Comics and a novelization written by Lou Cameron, with 250,000 copies of the latter printed by Fawcett Publications.

Marvin Miller narrated the theatrical trailer.

=== Theatrical run ===
None but the Brave debuted in Japan on January 15, 1965, followed by a roadshow theatrical release throughout the United States the next month. Warner Bros. managed the international release, except in Japan and the then-American-occupied Okinawa, where Toho handled distribution. The Japanese version ran for 99 minutes, while the American cut lasted 105 minutes. The American premiere was held at Chicago's Oriental Theatre on February 11, with Sands and Tony Bill in attendance. It went on to gross US$21,000 there over its first four days. On February 24, it opened in 100 theaters across New York. The film was also shown as a double feature with Zulu (1964) in Provo, Utah.

Boxoffice listed None but the Brave amongst the Top Hits of 1964 and 1965, with earnings 168% above the film industry average. It earned $2.5 million in distributor rentals in the United States and Canada, making it a moderate box office success there. In 1965, rentals typically represented roughly 27.6% (U.S. only) to 29.8% (U.S. and Canada) of a film's total box office gross. This suggests the film grossed approximately $8–9 million at the North American box office. The film also sold 1.2 million tickets in Spain, and 732.6 thousand in France.

Sinatra's first date with his future wife, Mia Farrow, was a screening of the film.

== Reception ==
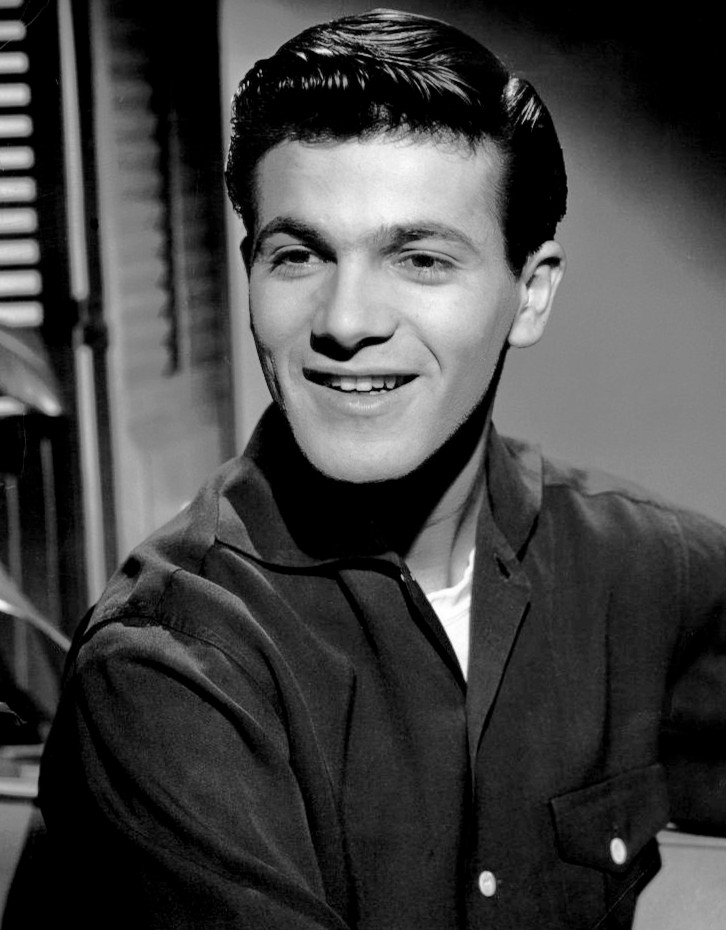
The performance of Tommy Sands (pictured in 1957) drew widespread critical disapproval. A Los Angeles Times review calling him "hopelessly hammy" prompted Sands to punch critic Kevin Thomas in the face during a 1965 encounter.

Upon its release, None but the Brave received mixed or polarized reviews from critics. A Boxoffice survey noted six favorable reviews and one unfavorable. According to a Consumer Reports reader poll, audience reviews for the film were generally positive, while the critical consensus was mixed to positive. The film's soundtrack booklet claims that although its reception was mixed, Sinatra's directing was often praised as a solid debut effort. Sinatra biographer Daniel O'Brien states the film's reviews were "mixed, often favorable", whereas Tim Knight and James Kaplan conveyed that not all reviews were unfavorable, but those that were noted for sounding particularly hostile. The 1965 issue of Movie Life Yearbook and Robert Appelbaum assert that critics mostly panned the film, with the latter adding they overlooked its innovative aspects and only focused on its flaws.

Sinatra's direction and the script especially polarized reviewers. Variety commended Sinatra for "maintaining a suspenseful pace", while The New York Times critic Bosley Crowther found the direction unoriginal and the script contrived. A Time reviewer acknowledged the film's pacifist message but criticized its reliance on stereotypical characters and a simplistic, action-oriented climax. The Cincinnati Post deemed the film "among Hollywood's all-time worsts" due to its "trite" premise, and a Boxoffice reviewer attributed the film's uneven execution to Sinatra's inexperience as a director, resulting in "the ruination of a good story". A Film Quarterly critic wrote the direction was "a bit haphazard, and it can hardly sustain so weak a script; there are moments, but the character work is atrocious". In contrast, Citizen News, The Atlanta Journal, and Kevin Thomas of the Los Angeles Times praised Sinatra's directorial approach, with the latter describing it as "straightforward and understated". Furthermore, Brazil's Correio da Manhã observed that "Sinatra's humanist and pacifist spirit failed to impress critics".

Many critics found the closing intertitle "Nobody ever wins" memorable; The Toronto Star reviewer dismissed it as "cheaply offensive" in context. Though some acknowledged the anti-war message as clear, they judged it muddled by clichéd execution and tonal inconsistencies. Phyllis Funke of the Courier Journal called the theme "painfully mediocre", feeling that while the "Nobody ever wins" lands plainly, trite war-movie tropes undermine its impact.

Although reviews of the actors' performances were assorted, Sinatra's acting was often highlighted over his directing, according to The Sydney Morning Herald. Crowther praised Sinatra's performance but rebuked the rest of the American cast as unconvincing. The Japanese cast was described by Time and the Asbury Park Press as outperforming their American counterparts. Citizen News described the film as a "minor tour de force for Walker and Mihashi, but most other cast members acquit themselves well." Sands faced criticism for an exaggerated performance in outlets including The Boston Globe, The Cincinnati Post, the Chicago Tribune and the British newspapers Acton Gazette and Esher News & Mail. Though he lauded most of the performances, Thomas also echoed this critique of Sands by calling him "hopelessly hammy". As stated by Sands' publicist, this remark angered Sands and led to him punching Thomas in the nose during an encounter at the Los Angeles Times building later that year. The incident reportedly resulted in Thomas becoming the Los Angeles Times' go-to full-time film critic for around five decades.

The film's technical aspects were largely praised, especially the cinematography, special effects, and Williams' score. The Atlanta Journal also highlighted Sam O'Steen's editing, and described the score as "maritally suitable for backgrounding and keeps pace with the action".

In late 1965, None but the Brave won the Olivier d'Or, Belgium's highest film honor, awarded by the Jury of the Prix Femina.

== Post-release and legacy ==
=== Aftermath ===
According to Sinatra's valet George Jacobs, Frank cast son-in-law Sands in a prominent role in the film to revive his faltering acting career. However, the harsh reviews of Sands' performance—compounded by his widely-reported physical altercation with a critic—accelerated further to his decline. Overwhelmed, Sands abruptly left Hollywood and his marriage to Nancy Sinatra, deeply affecting their daughter. Despite his volatile reputation, Sinatra refrained from public retaliation. Jacobs also considered the film a box-office bomb.

In 1976, Sinatra expressed frustration that journalists overlooked his directorial work on None but the Brave in the years following its release, describing it as a "damn good" film.

None but the Brave was released on VHS in April 1998, and later on DVD. In 1999, renewed interest in World War II films, sparked by Saving Private Ryan and The Thin Red Line (both released in 1998), prompted Warner Home Video to capitalize on the trend by re-pricing None but the Brave to under $10.

=== Cultural influence ===
None but the Brave is considered innovative for its early anti-war stance at the onset of the Vietnam War era, empathetic portrayal of both Japanese and American soldiers, and using subtitles for Japanese dialogue. Its balanced view of both sides of the conflict set a precedent for the war film genre, influencing later Hollywood films such as Beach Red (1967), Hell in the Pacific (1968), and Clint Eastwood's Letters from Iwo Jima (2006).

Though the film remains likely best remembered as Sinatra's sole directing credit, it has also been recognized as an important credit for pre-fame Williams. His work on the film helped him develop his unique musical style later seen in major films. Williams has noted that his experience composing for None but the Brave, particularly his exploration of Japanese musical traditions, collaboration with Japanese musicians, and study of traditional instruments, influenced his score for Memoirs of a Geisha (2005). Additionally, the atmospheric and suspenseful elements in his None but the Brave score have been likened to his later work on Close Encounters of the Third Kind (1977) and Raiders of the Lost Ark (1981).

The film served as an inspiration for "Rocks and Shoals" (1997), an episode from the sixth season of Star Trek: Deep Space Nine. According to showrunner Ira Steven Behr, the writing team watched the film together to guide their war-focused stories for the season. It is also referenced in Neil LaBute's 2004 play Fat Pig, wherein it is mentioned by the character Helen and emphasizes that she has a taste for obscure films.

Cyril Jordan, frontman of the rock band Flamin' Groovies, named the album Shake Some Action and its title song after a line said by Sands' character in None but the Brave.

=== Critical reassessment ===
As Flavorwire noted in 2013, the film has since undergone renewed interest and a more favorable critical reputation. Reviewers have commended Sinatra's direction, alongside his, Mihashi's, and Walker performances, Williams' score, and the screenplay's balanced humanization of American and Japanese soldiers. However, Sands' acting is still widely criticized as over-the-top, and some note uneven pacing by modern standards.

Current critic Robert Horton (of Washington's The Herald) calls None but the Brave "a 1965 anti-war picture that turns out to be much more interesting and compelling than its reputation would suggest," that "predates the rash of anti-war counterculture movies by a few years," also noting that it "bears the influence of Bridge on the River Kwai with a little Mister Roberts thrown in, but it has a bitterness about war that goes all the way through to the forceful final title, a reflection of Sinatra's liberal views at the time." Horton points out that Clint Eastwood received a lot of credit for making two films that showed World War II from the American and the Japanese sides (Flags of Our Fathers and Letters from Iwo Jima), but that "in a way, Sinatra had already done it, and in one movie." Screen Rant described it as a "dark - but cliched - anti-war epic" and praised Sinatra's direction and Mihashi's performance.

Filmink called it "not a bad picture, surprisingly anti-war and sympathetic to the Japanese (Clint Walker has the lead more than Sinatra), but Sands’ performance is dreadful."

== Bibliography ==
- "None but the Brave Set For February Premiere". Boxoffice. January 25, 1965.
- Galbraith IV, Stuart (2008). The Toho Studios Story: A History and Complete Filmography. Scarecrow Press. ISBN 9781461673743.
- Knight, Timothy (October 12, 2010). Sinatra: Hollywood His Way. Running Press Book Publishers. p. 79. ISBN 978-0-7624-4174-7.
- Ryfle, Steve (1998). Japan's Favorite Mon-Star: The Unauthorized Biography of the Big G. ECW Press. ISBN 1550223488.
- "Top Grossers of 1965". Variety. January 5, 1966.
