= The Sailor Who Fell from Grace with the Sea (film) =

- Theatrical release poster
- Directed by: Lewis John Carlino
- Screenplay by: Lewis John Carlino
- Based on: 午後の曳航 (The Sailor Who Fell from Grace with the Sea) by Yukio Mishima
- Produced by: Martin Poll; Kikumaru Okuda
- Starring: Kris Kristofferson; Sarah Miles
- Cinematography: Douglas Slocombe
- Edited by: Antony Gibbs
- Music by: John Mandel
- Production companies: Haworth Productions by: Martin Poll-Lewis John Carlino Production; Sailor Company
- Distributed by: AVCO Embassy Pictures (through Fox-Rank)
- Release date: April 5, 1976 (United Kingdom)
- Running time: 105 minutes
- Country: United Kingdom
- Language: English
- Box office: $7 million

The Sailor Who Fell from Grace with the Sea is a 1976 British drama film starring Kris Kristofferson and Sarah Miles, directed by Lewis John Carlino. It was adapted by Carlino from the 1963 novel of the same name by the Japanese writer Yukio Mishima. The novel is set in Japan but for the film the story's location was changed to the English town of Dartmouth, Devon, where it was also filmed.

== Plot ==
Jonathan Osborne, the 14-year-old son of widow Anne Osborne, has become involved with a group of boys led by a neo-Nietzschean sadistic boy named "Chief". Anne daydreams about her husband who died three years earlier. When a large merchant ship anchors temporarily in the harbour, Anne arranges to give her son a tour of the vessel. They meet the second officer of the ship, Jim Cameron. Jim takes a liking to both the boy and his mother. Jim and Anne become involved sexually, which throws Jonathan into a rage of jealousy. Cameron returns to sea and while he is gone, Jonathan reveals his jealous sentiment to the group leader, Chief. When Cameron comes back to renew his relationship with Anne and forsake his life on the sea, Chief and the boys concoct a sinister plot to do away with the intruder.

== Cast ==
- Sarah Miles as Anne Osborne
- Kris Kristofferson as Jim Cameron
- Jonathan Kahn as Jonathan Osborne
- Margo Cunningham as Mrs. Palmer
- Earl Rhodes as "Chief"
- Paul Tropea as "#2"

== Production ==
The movie was filmed on location in and around Dartmouth, Devon, England.

== Reception ==
Tony Rayns wrote in The Monthly Film Bulletin: "Whatever the merits of Mishima's book, and however invidious comparisons between a film and a literary source, there is no denying that the original text here rests squarely on philosophical premises that are distinctively Japanese: a peculiar union of precocity and conformity among the boys, and a fanatical notion of honour and purity shared by all the characters. Straw Dogs demonstrated that equally alien premises could be transplanted to an English setting effectively enough by simply disregarding the conventions of British 'realism', but Carlino's mixture of awkward naturalism and gauche romanticism suggests that he was blind to the risks; the naturalism turns the group of schoolboys into a gang of immature brats dominated by the school bully, while the romanticism leads the film into suite after suite of interminable dissolves from soulful stare to seascape and back again, so that the characters' motivations, divorced from any coherent context, seem consistently bizarre and often risible."

In The Radio Times Guide to Films Adrian Turner gave the film 3/5 stars, writing: "This is a weird, sometimes disturbing, sometimes downright laughable adaptation of a novel by the Japanese writer Yukio Mishima ... Experts felt that the core elements of Mishima's novel went AWOL in the transition from Japan to England, but there's no denying the strangeness of the story, the sexually charged atmosphere or the power of Sarah Miles's emotionally naked performance."

John C. Mahoney of the Los Angeles Free Press saw the central triangle through the prism of Greek myth: "How much Oedipal vengeance is there in his sense of betrayal by adults, his growing conviction that he must participate in a ritual to return Kristofferson to his place in the pure order of the sea and away from the corruption of his code on land? The intricate ambiguities are the substance of Sailor. Kristofferson is an uncommonly strong presence, who does not appear to try to exceed the limitations of a natural performance. Miles gives a superior performance, a pure and unsuspecting Circe sending out a sensual call".

Variety wrote: "With a quartet of fine characters and performances, The Sailor Who Fell From Grace With The Sea could have ventured just about anywhere – except where writer-director Lewis John Carlino takes it in an effort to remain faithful to Yukio Mishima's novel. Too many holes to stay afloat long. Cultural differences still remain in this increasingly homogenized world and the prime problem with "Sailor" is trying to transfer decidedly Oriental ideas about honor, order and death into an English countryside."

Critic John Simon said it was "very pretty to look at, and makes absolutely no sense".

== Accolades ==
- Nominee, Best Actress Golden Globe award (Sarah Miles)
- Nominee, Best Actor Debut Golden Globe award (Jonathan Kahn)

== Availability ==
On June 19, 2012, Shout! Factory released the film to Blu-ray.
