= The Story of Osaka Castle =

- Theatrical release poster
- Directed by: Hiroshi Inagaki
- Written by: Hiroshi Inagaki (screenplay); Takeshi Kimura (screenplay) based on novel by Genzo Murakami
- Produced by: Tomoyuki Tanaka
- Starring: Toshiro Mifune; Kyōko Kagawa; Akihiko Hirata
- Cinematography: Kazuo Yamada
- Music by: Akira Ifukube
- Distributed by: Toho Company Ltd.
- Release date: January 3, 1961 (Japan)
- Running time: 95 minutes
- Country: Japan
- Language: Japanese

The Story of Osaka Castle (大坂城物語, Ōsaka-jō Monogatari) (Note: Also known as Daredevil in the Castle) is a 1961 Japanese Jidaigeki film directed by Hiroshi Inagaki, with special effects by Eiji Tsuburaya. The film is based on historical events taking place in Japan during the beginning of the 17th century.

== Plot ==
The plot is set in the 1610s, about a decade after the battle of Sekigahara (1600). Toshiro Mifune's character, Mohei is a contumacious wandering samurai with his very own point of view. He arrives in the city of Osaka to look for new beginning. As a backdrop, there unfolds a conspiracy masterminded by the Toyotomi clan to rein in Lord Ieyasu Tokugawa's ambition for personal domination of Japan.

== Cast ==
- Toshiro Mifune as Mohei
- Kyōko Kagawa as Ai
- Yuriko Hoshi as Senhime
- Yoshiko Kuga as Kobue
- Isuzu Yamada as Yodogimi
- Yosuke Natsuki as Chomonshu Kimura
- Jun Tazaki as Teikabo Tsutumi
- Danko Ichikawa (Sarunosuke Ichikawa) as Saizo Muin
- Akihiko Hirata as Hayatonosho (Hayato) Susukida
- Takashi Shimura as Katagiri Katsumoto
- Koedako Kuroiwa as Nobuo
- Tetsurō Tamba as Sadamasa Ishikawa
- Tadao Nakamaru as Hyogo
- Ryosuke Kagawa as Michiiku Itamiya
- Yu Fujiki as Danuemon Hanawa
- Seizaburo Kawazu as Ōno Harunaga
- Susumu Fujita as Katsuyasu Sakakibara
- Hanshiro Iwai as Toyotomi Hideyori
- Sachi Sakai as Kai Hayami
- Yoshio Kosugi as Gidayu Fujimoto
- Kichijiro Ueda as Jinbei (owner of the equipment shop)
- Chieko Nakakita as Kyoku (of Yae)
- Haruko Togo as woman out of Ono
- Hideyo Amamoto as interpreter
- Junichiro Mukai as Kumoi
- Shoji Ikeda as Chusho Nanjo
- Shiro Tsuchiya as Tosho Horita
- Akira Tani as rice shop owner
- Shin Otomo as Itamiya manager
- Katsumi Tezuka as Shuma Ono
- Senkichi Omura
- Ikio Sawamura
- Koji Uno
- Yasuhisa Tatsumi
- Haruo Nakajima
- Hans Horneff
- Bill Bassman
- Toshiko Nakano
- Osman Yusef
