= Kikumaru Okuda =

Japanese film producer

- 奥田 喜久丸
- Born: c. 1928; Tokyo, Empire of Japan
- Died: October 15, 2000 (aged 72); Los Angeles, California, U.S.
- Education: Keio University
- Occupation: Film producer
- Years active: 1958–c. 1975

Kikumaru Okuda (奥田 喜久丸, Okuda Kikumaru; c. 1928 – October 15, 2000) was a Japanese film producer. His credits included None but the Brave (1965), You Only Live Twice (1967), and Lady Snowblood (1973). Okuda had alleged yakuza ties linked to Caesars Palace in Las Vegas, leading to his arrest and imprisonment in 1975.

== Life and career ==
Okuda was born circa 1928, in Tokyo. He graduated Keio University in 1950. Eight years later, Okuda began his career at Tokyo Eiga in their film planning division. His first planning credit was for Hito mo arukeba (1960) and he became a film producer in 1963, debuting with Naughty Angel. Among his producer credits are None but the Brave (1965), Kigeki ekimae kazan (1968), Konto 55: The Great Outer Space Adventure (1969), The Walking Major, Zeni Geba (both 1970), Shadow Hunters, Kage gari: Hoero taiho (both 1972), Rebellion Reward, Did the Red Bird Escape?, Slaughter in the Snow, Gokiburi deka (1973), Lady Snowblood, Za Gokiburi, Marco (all 1973), and Lady Snowblood: Love Song of Vengeance (1974). His last film credit was for The Sailor Who Fell from Grace with the Sea (1976).

Okuda allegedly developed yakuza and mob affiliations during his film career. In the 1970s, Okuda was linked to Caesars Palace in Las Vegas, where he reportedly recruited Japanese high rollers and collected debts, sometimes inflating amounts to skim profits. In June 1975, he and two others were arrested in Tokyo and jailed for suspected yakuza connections and extortion. He died in Los Angeles on October 15, 2000, at the age of 72.

== Filmography ==
- Hito mo arukeba (1960) - Planner
- Hagure kigeki mandara (1962) - Planner
- Naughty Angel (1963) - Producer
- None but the Brave (1965) - Story writer and producer [with Frank Sinatra]
- New Crime Reporter: The Trap of the Big City (1966) - Producer
- New Crime Reporter: Murderous Hill (1966) - Producer
- You Only Live Twice (1967) - Technical advisor
- Kigeki ekimae kazan (1968) - Producer
- Hot Vacation (1968) - Producer
- Kigeki ekimae sanbashi (1969) - Producer
- Konto 55: The Great Outer Space Adventure (1969) - Producer
- The Walking Major (1970) - Story writer and producer
- Zeni Geba (1970) - Producer
- Comedy: The 300 Million Yen Mission (1971) - Producer
- 3000 Kilometer Trap (1971) - Producer
- The Trail of Blood (1972) - Producer
- Shadow Hunters (1972) - Producer
- The Fearless Avenger (1972) - Producer
- Kage gari: Hoero taiho (1972) - Producer
- Rebellion Reward (1973) - Producer [with Yūjirō Ishihara]
- Did the Red Bird Escape? (1973) - Producer
- Slaughter in the Snow (1973) - Producer
- Gokiburi deka (1973) - Producer
- Lady Snowblood (1973) - Producer
- Za Gokiburi (1973) - Producer
- Marco (1973) - Producer
- Lady Snowblood: Love Song of Vengeance (1974) - Producer
- The Sailor Who Fell from Grace with the Sea (1976)
