= Homare Suguro =

Japanese actor and singer (1940–2026)

- 勝呂 誉
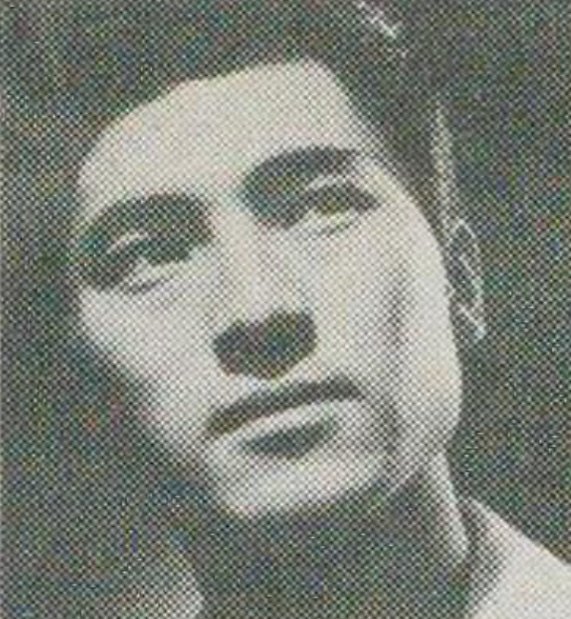
- Suguro c. 1962
- Born: June 1, 1940; Hyōgo, Japan
- Died: January 23, 2026 (aged 85)
- Occupations: Actor, singer
- Years active: 1961–2026
- Spouse: Mayumi Ozora (m. 1968; div. 1982)
- Children: 1

Homare Suguro (勝呂 誉, Suguro Homare; June 1, 1940 – January 23, 2026) was a Japanese actor and singer. He worked for Shochiku Geino.

== Life and career ==
Suguro was born in Hyōgo Prefecture, Japan on June 1, 1940. He made his acting debut in the 1961 film Tree of Youth, and later appeared in films such as Shitamachi no Taiyo (1963), Nijūissai no Chichi (1964), None but the Brave (1965), and No Greater Love Than This (1968). His television credits include Shichinin no Mago (1964–1965) and Operation: Mystery (1968–1969). The most recent film he has appeared in was the tokusatsu production Electric Ace Chaos (2023).

He also had an active career as a singer, and signed with King Records in 1964, starting making records for them early the following year. Frank Sinatra, director of None but the Brave, also asked Suguro to make a song for the film's soundtrack.

Suguro and actress Mayumi Ozora (her real name being Sachiko Nakata) announced their engagement at a press conference on July 7, 1968, and married on October 2, 1968. They had a son, Motohiro, whom Ozora raised after the couple divorced in 1982. Motohiro attempted to become an actor like his parents but was unsuccessful, and later developed a drug addiction and was arrested in 2002 and 2003, for using stimulants. In 2008, Motohiro was arrested a third time and sentenced to one year and four months in prison.

Homare Suguro died on January 23, 2026, at the age of 85.
