= Tōru Minegishi (actor) =

Japanese actor (1943–2008)

- Born: 17 July 1943; Tokyo, Japan
- Died: 11 October 2008 (aged 65); Tokyo, Japan
- Occupation: Actor
- Years active: 1963–2008

Tōru Minegishi (峰岸徹, Minegishi Tōru; 17 July 1943 – 11 October 2008) was a Japanese actor. He appeared in more than one hundred films from 1963 to 2008.

== Selected filmography ==
Year	Title	Role	Notes
1970	If You Were Young: Rage		
1973	Za Gokiburi	Yamaoka Masashi	
1974	The Last Samurai	Aizawa	
1983	Shōsetsu Yoshida Gakkō	Takeo Miki	
1986	Minami e Hashire, Umi no Michi o!		
1986	His Motorbike, Her Island	Onozato	
1988	Tokyo: The Last Megalopolis	Kudō	
1989	Godzilla vs. Biollante	Col. Goro Gondo	
1993	Kōkō Kyōshi	Kōsuke Ninomiya	
1996	Fudoh: The New Generation	Iwao Fudoh	
1997	Suna no Shiro	Hokuho Mizuhara	
2008	Departures		
2009	Shinjuku Incident	Koichi Muranishi	Final film (posthumous release)
