= Earl Rhodes =

British television actor

Earl Rhodes (born July 1962) is an English former television and cinema actor, who was active professionally from the mid-1970s to the late 1980s.

== Acting career ==
Rhodes first appeared on British television at the age of 14 years old in the British Broadcasting Corporation series I, Claudius (1976), playing Emperor Augustus's grandson Gaius Caesar. The same year he played Chief in the film The Sailor Who Fell from Grace with the Sea, opposite Sarah Miles and Kris Kristofferson.

In 1978 he played the character of 'Willi Frisch' in two episodes of the science-fiction television series The Tomorrow People in a storyline concerning Nazi Germany during World War II. He also had a role in The Medusa Touch, starring Richard Burton, and appeared in the 1982 Vietnam war film How Sleep the Brave.

In the mid-1980s he appeared on British television in several roles. He played the character of 'Jiff' in the mini-series Johnny Jarvis (1983); appeared in the television film Thank You, Mrs. Clinkscales (1984), and played role of 'Kennard', a schoolboy in a television mini-series dramatisation of Goodbye, Mr. Chips (1984). He also acted in the role of 'Ben Golding' in several episodes of the medical soap opera The Practice (1985).

In 1985 he played the biggest role of his career as 'Dudley', the schoolboy rival of Arthur Conan Doyle's Sherlock Holmes's early years, in the cinema film Young Sherlock Holmes.

In the late 1980s he appeared in the role of 'Foxton' in the Cambridge University based historical comedy television series Porterhouse Blue (1987).

== Post-acting life ==
In the 1990s Rhodes abandoned professional acting and moved into television production as a cameraman.

From 2000 to 2003, Rhodes was the director of the United Kingdom Falun Gong Association. In 2002 Rhodes was arrested in Beijing, and he was detained for questioning by the Chinese police for activities related to the Falun Gong religious movement in China. He was subsequently deported to the United Kingdom by the Chinese government.
