= Za Gokiburi =

- Film poster
- Directed by: Tsugunobu Kotani
- Screenplay by: Wataru Kenmochi; Tsugunobu Kotani
- Story by: Isao Nioka
- Produced by: Yūjirō Ishihara; Kikumaru Okuda; Masahiko Kobayashi
- Starring: Tetsuya Watari; Tetsuro Tamba; Masaya Oki; Kaku Takashina; Tōru Minegishi; Shunsuke Kariya; Toru Abe
- Cinematography: Mitsuji Kanau
- Edited by: Juro Watanabe
- Music by: Takeo Watanabe
- Distributed by: Toho; Ishihara Promotion
- Release date: December 1, 1973 (Japan)
- Running time: 83 minutes
- Country: Japan
- Language: Japanese

Za Gokiburi (Japanese: ザ・ゴキブリ) is a 1973 Japanese action film directed by Tsugunobu Kotani. It is the second film of the Detective Gokiburi series. The film is based on Isao Shinoka's manga Gokiburi Deka, in which the central character, Narugami Ryo, is a detective nicknamed "Gokiburi" (cockroach).

== Cast ==
- Tetsuya Watari as Narugami Ryo
- Tetsuro Tamba as Kojima
- Masaya Oki as Hashimoto
- Yoshiro Aoki as Ito
- Kōji Nanbara as Shimura
- Kaku Takashina as Yoshida
- Tōru Minegishi as Yamaoka Masashi
- Shunsuke Kariya as Nakagawa
- Toru Abe as Kuroda Tsuyoshi
