= Katsuya Susaki =

Japanese screenwriter (1922–2015)

- 須崎 勝彌
- Born: January 1, 1922; Keijō, Korea, Empire of Japan
- Died: January 9, 2015 (aged 93); Machida, Tokyo, Japan
- Other name: Katsuya Suzaki
- Education: Tohoku University
- Occupations: Screenwriter; novelist
- Years active: 1947–2010
- Military career
- Allegiance: Empire of Japan
- Service years: 1942–1945
- Conflicts: Pacific War; World War II

Katsuya Susaki (須崎 勝彌, Susaki Katsuya; January 1, 1922 – January 9, 2015) was a Japanese screenwriter and novelist. He is perhaps best remembered for his contributions to war films, which drew on his personal experiences as a surviving kamikaze pilot. His works often explored themes of sacrifice, camaraderie, and the human cost of conflict, reflecting the emotional impact of losing comrades in battle. The film actors were often people who had experienced war first hand.

== Early life and education ==
Susaki, sometimes written as Suzaki, was born in Keijō, Korea, Empire of Japan on January 1, 1922. His father worked for Mitsubishi Materials in Seoul at the time. After both of his parents died around 1941, Susaki moved to Kushikino, Kagoshima. In 1943, he graduated from the Faculty of Law, Tohoku University.

=== World War II ===
He was drafted into the Izumi Air Group as a second lieutenant during this period. He served on the Okinawa front and was stationed at Ibaraki Prefecture's Hyakuri Naval Air Corps until the war ended. He was also a surviving kamikaze pilot.

== Career ==
After the war, Susaki joined Shintoho in 1947, initially working as an assistant director. His screenwriting debut was the Daiei film Tomorrow is Sunday (1952). He left Shintoho in 1953 and signed a screenwriting contract with Daiei before joining Toho in 1955. He worked on many war films at Toho, including Ningen Gyorai Kaiten (1955), Submarine I-57 Will Not Surrender (1959), Attack Squadron! (1963), and the American-Japanese co-production None but the Brave (1965). He later became a freelancer in 1969. He received the 16th Scenario Achievement Award from the Japan Scenario Writers Association, and later wrote books about his experiences during World War II.

== Death ==
He died on January 9, 2015, at Machida, Tokyo. Susaki was reported to have been aged 93 at the time of his death. His funeral was held for close relatives, with the chief mourner being his eldest son Seishi.

== Filmography ==
- Bengawan Solo (1951) - Assistant director
- Tomorrow is Sunday (1952) - Screenwriter
- Fireworks Dance (1952) - Screenwriter
- Ningen Gyorai Kaiten (1955) - Screenwriter
- Submarine I-57 Will Not Surrender (1959) - Screenwriter [with Takeshi Kimura]
- Attack Squadron! (1963) - Screenwriter
- Siege of Fort Bismarck (1963) - Screenwriter
- None but the Brave (1965) - Screenwriter [with John Twist]
- Retreat from Kiska (1965) - Screenwriter
- Zero Fighters (1965) - Screenwriter
- Ah, My Cherry Blossoms (1967) - Screenwriter [with Sadao Nakajima]
- Admiral Yamamoto (1968) - Screenwriter
- The Falcon Fighters (1969) - Screenwriter
- The Sound of Waves (1975) - Screenwriter
- Zero Pilot (1976) - Screenwriter
- Imperial Navy (1981) - Screenwriter
- The Highest Honour (1982) - Screenwriter

== Books ==
- The Truth About Kamikaze: The Suicide Attack Forces Are Not Terrorists (2004)
- Rethinking Pearl Harbor: The Two-Rank Promotion and Its Surroundings (2006)
- Tragic Song of the Blue Sky: Student Departure (published in 2017)
