= Susumu Fujita =

Japanese actor (1912–1991)

- 藤田 進
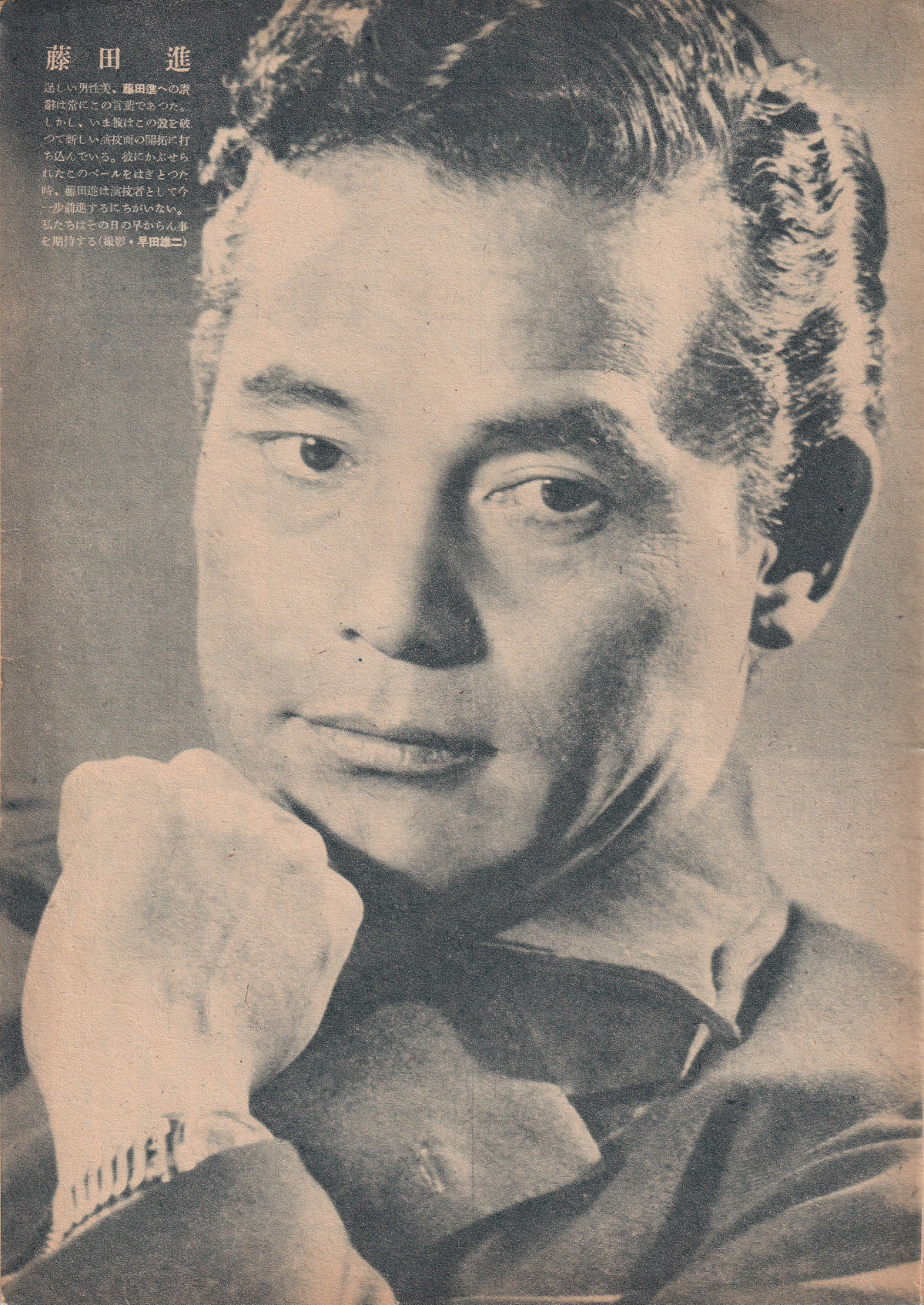
- Susumu Fujita in 1947
- Born: 8 January 1912; Kurume, Fukuoka, Japan
- Died: 23 March 1991 (aged 79); Shibuya, Tokyo, Japan
- Occupation: Actor
- Years active: 1939–1989

Susumu Fujita (藤田 進, Fujita Susumu; 8 January 1912 – 23 March 1991) was a Japanese film and television actor. He played the lead role in Akira Kurosawa's first feature, Sanshiro Sugata, and appeared in other Kurosawa films including The Men Who Tread On the Tiger's Tail (as Togashi, commander of the border guards) and The Hidden Fortress (as General Tadokoro). Later, he was a supporting actor in Ishirō Honda's Mothra vs. Godzilla, among many other films.

Before and during World War II Fujita was considered one of the great stars of Japanese cinema. In the post-war period he became known for supporting roles, often playing a soldier in war films, such as in Masaki Kobayashi's The Human Condition (film series). During the 1960s and 1970s he played minor roles in "special effects pictures" such as Ultraman and Frankenstein vs. Baragon.

== Life and career ==
Fujita was born in Kurume, Fukuoka in Japan. After graduating from high school in 1929 he moved to Tokyo, where he took entrance examinations for several universities, but failed to gain admission. Before returning to Fukuoka he stayed in Kyoto with Takuji Furumi, a film director from his home town. With assistance from Furumi, he secured employment with producer Utaemon Ishikawa as an extra. He was hired as an actor by Toa Cinema, but did not appear in any films that year. In 1932 he was drafted into military service and enlisted in the 12th Artillery Division. After being discharged from the army in 1934, Fujita went to work for Masahiro Makino's Kyoto Film Recording as an audio engineer. He returned to acting in 1939, when he moved to Toho studios.

At first, Fujita was a contract player appearing in minor roles, but in 1940 he co-starred in Tsuma no baai (妻の場合) with Takako Irie and Minoru Takada; he was praised as a sincere and genuine actor. Beginning in 1941 he played a succession of leading roles, including Shido monogatari (指導物語). In 1943 he appeared in Sanshiro Sugata, the directorial debut of Akira Kurosawa, which brought him to wide popularity. Fujita's popularity as a manly action hero was further cemented with his performance in Kato Hayabusa Sentoutai (加藤隼戦闘隊). He was in the midst of filming The Men Who Tread On the Tiger's Tail when World War II ended.

After the war, Fujita condemned his own portrayal of war heroes and considered leaving acting. However, unable to see himself in any other profession, he returned to the screen. In 1946 he appeared in Kurosawa's first post-war film, No Regrets for Our Youth, about a war-time liberal who was executed for treason.

During a strike at Toho in 1948 Fujita, along with Denjiro Ōkochi, Kazuo Hasegawa and other members of the so-called "Flag ten" secession union broke away to form a new studio, Shintoho (New Toho). This reorganization ended Fujita's collaboration with Kurosawa. At Shintoho, he appeared in several melodramas and action films.

After his contract with Shintoho ended in 1957, Fujita returned to Toho, where he appeared primarily in supporting roles. Fujita and Kurosawa worked together again on The Hidden Fortress in 1958. Although Fujita appeared in a supporting role, it was essential to the film. He appeared in three more Kurosawa films, including Yojimbo, but only in minor roles.

== Selected filmography ==
- Hataraku ikka (1939) - Genji's fellow worker (uncredited)
- Shanhai rikusentai (1939) - Marine N.C.O. (uncredited)
- Ribbon o musubu fujin (1939)
- Byakuran no uta: zenpen: kōhen (1939)
- Moyuru ōzora (1940)
- Tsuma no baai (1940)
- Kaigun bakugekitai (1940)
- Okumura Ioko (1940)
- Nessa no chikai (1940) - Chen Suyan
- Shidō monogatari (1941) - Shintaro Sagawa
- Seishun no kiryū (1942) - Murakami
- Midori no daichi (1942)
- Haha wa shinazu (1942)
- Hawaii Mare okikaisen (1942) - Yamashita
- Sanshiro Sugata (a.k.a. Judo Saga) (1943) - Sanshiro Sugata
- Wakaki hi no yorokobi (1943) - Naotaro Fujita
- Neppū (1943)
- Himetaru kakugo (1943) - Navy officer
- Kato hayabusa sento-tai (1944)
- Raigekitai Shutsudō (1944)
- Raigekitai shutsudo (1944)
- Nichijō no tatakai (1944)
- Kanjōkai no bara (1945)
- Sanshiro Sugata Part II (1945) - Sanshiro Sugata
- Nihon kengō den (1945) - Yagyu Tajima-no-kami
- Kita no san-nin (1945) - Kakuta
- Koi no fuunjî (1945)
- The Men Who Tread On the Tiger's Tail (1945) - Togashi
- Urashima Tarō no kōei (1946) - Goro Urashima
- Minshū no Teki (1946)
- Those Who Make Tomorrow (1946) - Fujita
- Reijin (1946) - Shinichi Tazawa
- No Regrets for Our Youth (1946) - Ruykichi Noge
- Aru yo no Tonosama (1946)
- A Thousand and One Nights with Toho (1947)
- Kâkedashî jidaî (1947)
- Hana hiraku - Machiko yori (1948) - Teruhiko Kuwai
- Issun-boshi (1948)
- Ikiteiru gazō (1948) - Yutaka Nambara
- Shirozukin arawaru (1949) - Senta
- Kirare no Senta (1949)
- Mori no Ishimatsu (1949) - Ishimatsu
- Umi no G-men (1950)
- Kai Jo G-Men (1950)
- Sasameyuki (1950) - Minoru Mimaki
- Hi no tori (1950)
- Netsudeichi (1950)
- Ginza Sanshiro (1950)
- Jiyuu gakko (1951) - Hei-san
- Bungawan soro (1951)
- Avalanche (1952) - Kōsuke Kijima
- Himeyuri no tō (1953) - Dr. Oka
- Kenbei (1953)
- Senkan Yamato (1953) - Jiro Nomura
- Waga koi no lila no kokage ni (1953)
- Hana to ryū - Dai-ichi-bu: Dōkai-wan no rantō (1954) - Kingorō Tamai
- Hana to ryū - Dai-ni-bu: Aijō ruten (1954) - Kingorō Tamai
- Horafuki tanji (1954) - Farmer Tanji
- Sensuikan Rogō imada fujōsezu (1954)
- Nihon yaburezu (1954)
- Hana to ryu (1954)
- Non-chan kumo ni noru (1955) - Nobuko's father
- Ai no rekishi (1955) - Ichirō Kaibara
- Hokkai no hanran (1956) - Atsuo Kuroda
- Silver Snake Iwashiya (1956)
- Revenge of the Pearl Queen (1956) - Kenji Asamura
- Rōnin-gai (1957) - Gonbei Horo
- Awa odori naruto no kaizoku (1957)
- Escapade in Japan (1957) - Kei Tanaka
- Jirochō gaiden: Ōabare jirochō ikka (1957)
- The Mysterians (1957) - Gen. Morita
- Emperor Meiji and the Great Russo-Japanese War (1958)
- Satsujinki: Kumo-otoko (1958) - Kogorō Akechi
- The Hidden Fortress (1958) - General Hyoe Tadokoro
- Kumo-otoko no gyakushū (1958) - Kogorō Akechi
- Songokū (1959)
- Submarine I-57 Will Not Surrender (1959)
- The Human Condition (1959) - Naruto Nitōhei
- Watashi wa kai ni naritai (1959)
- Kunisada Chūji (1960) - Magistrate Jubei Matsui
- Storm Over the Pacific (1960)
- The Bad Sleep Well (1960) - Detective
- Yatarō gasa (1960) - Boss Daihachi
- Shii no tsūisekishâ (1960)
- The Story of Osaka Castle (1961) - Katsuyasu Sakakibara
- Yojimbo (1961) - Homma - Instructor Who Skips Town
- Ai to honoho to (1961) - Niimura
- Dobunezumi sakusen (1962)
- Chushingura: 47 Samurai (1962) - Yosobei Kajikawa
- Attack Squadron! (1963) - Yamato Commander Ito
- High and Low (a.k.a. The Ransom) (1963) - Chief of First Investigating Section
- Chintao yosai bakugeki meirei (a.k.a. Siege of Fort Bismarck) (1963)
- Hiken (1963)
- Atragon (1963) - Defense Commander
- Kokusai himitsu keisatsu (1964) - Meishi's Boss
- Kyo mo ware ozora ni ari (1964)
- Mothra vs. Godzilla (1964) - JSDF General
- Dagora the Space Monster (1964) - General Iwasa
- Horafuki taikoki (1964) - Yoshimoto Imagawa
- Samurai Assassin (1965) - Tatewaki Todo
- Kiga Kaikyo (1965) - Police Chief
- Zoku shachō ninpōchō (1965)
- Fūrai ninpōchō (1965)
- Taiheiyo kiseki no sakusen Kisuka (1965) - Akitani
- Frankenstein vs. Baragon (1965) - Osaka Police Chief
- Zero faita dai kūsen (1966)
- Nippon ankokugai (1966)
- Nihon ânkokugai (1966)
- Rampaging Dragon of the North (1966)
- Bosū wa ore no kenjū de (1966)
- Japan's Longest Day (1967) - Colonel Toyojiro Haga - CO Imperial Guards 2nd Infantry Regiment
- Ultraman (1967)
- Admiral Yamamoto (1968) - Chūichi Nagumo
- Furesshuman wakadaishō (1969)
- Battle of the Japan Sea (1969) - Kamimura Hikonojō
- Hiko shonen: Wakamono no toride (1970) - Jiro Iwami - Boy
- Nora-neko rokku: Onna banchō (1970)
- The Militarists (1970) - Osami Nagano
- Tora! Tora! Tora! (1970) - Rear Admiral Tamon Yamaguchi
- Shiosai (1971)
- Shin Abashiri Bangaichi: Fubuki no Dai-Dassou (1971)
- Shin abashiri bangaichi: Arashi yobu shiretoko-misaki (1971)
- Bokyo Komori-uta (1972)
- The Gate of Youth (1975) - Yabe Tora
- Nihon no jingi (1977)
- Fuyu no hana (1978) - Ryokichi Sakata
- Ultraman: Great Monster Decisive Battle (1979)
- Shikake-nin Baian (1981) - Hanemon Otowaya
- The Imperial Navy (1981) - Koshirō Oikawa
- Kaikyō (1982)
- Namidabashi (1983)
- Detective Story (1983) - Gozo Kunizaki
- Mori no mukougawa (1988)
- Roppongi banana boys (1989) - Tayama (final film role)
