= Attack Squadron! =

- Film poster
- Directed by: Shue Matsubayashi
- Screenplay by: Katsuya Suzaki
- Produced by: Tomoyuki Tanaka; Yasuyoshi Tajitsu
- Starring: Toshiro Mifune; Yuzo Kayama; Takashi Shimura; Yosuke Natsuki
- Cinematography: Takeshi Suzuki
- Edited by: Yoshitami Kuroiwa
- Music by: Ikuma Dan
- Production company: Toho
- Distributed by: Toho
- Release date: 3 January 1963 (Japan)
- Running time: 101 minutes
- Country: Japan

Attack Squadron! (Japanese: 太平洋の翼, Hepburn: Taiheiyō no Tsubasa; transl. "Wings of the Pacific") is a 1963 Japanese film directed by Shue Matsubayashi, with special effects by Eiji Tsuburaya. The film is about Lt. Colonel Senda (Toshiro Mifune) who commands three fighter squadrons, eventually being dominated by Allied forces in June 1944.

== Release ==
Attack Squadron! was released in Japan on 3 January 1963 where it was distributed by Toho. The film was Toho's second highest-grossing film of the year and the 9th highest-grossing domestic film production in Japan in 1963.

The film was released theatrically in the United States by Toho International with English subtitles on February 1, 1975. It was released to home video by Combat Home Video in 1988 as Kamikaze with an English-language dub. Stuart Galbraith IV commented on this release, stating that it was panned-and-scanned with "some of the worst telecine work ever done; the entire film appears to have been mastered showing only the extreme left side of the image."

== Cast ==
- Toshiro Mifune as Senda
- Yūzō Kayama as Taki
- Yosuke Natsuki as Aaka
- Makoto Satō as Yano
- Kō Nishimura as Inaba
- Yuriko Hoshi as Miyako Tamai
- Ryō Ikebe as Mihara
- Akihiko Hirata as Katō
- Ichirō Nakatani as Nakamura
- Kiyoshi Atsumi as Tange
- Takashi Shimura as Koshirō Oikawa
- Jun Tazaki as Nakama
- Seiji Miyaguchi as Takijirō Ōnishi
- Susumu Fujita as Seiichi Itō
