= Seymour Robbie =

American television director (1919–2004)

Seymour Robbie (August 25, 1919 – June 17, 2004) was a director of American television programs, whose work ranged from 1951 (Down You Go) to 1990 (Father Dowling Mysteries). His credits include game shows (e.g., The $64,000 Question), crime dramas (e.g., Kojak), action-adventure programs (e.g., Wonder Woman), and sitcoms (e.g., F Troop). He was born in New York City.

== Filmography ==
=== Theatrical and television films ===
- Art Carney Meets the Sorcerer's Apprentice (1959 TV movie)
- Spirit of the Alamo (1960 TV documentary)
- Beauty and the Beast (1969 TV movie)
- C.C. and Company (1970 theatrical film)
- Marco (1973 theatrical film)

=== Television series ===
Robbie directed one or more episodes of each of the following programs during the following years:

| Program | Year(s) |
|---|---|
| Down You Go | 1951 |
| Colonel Humphrey Flack | 1953 |
| Omnibus | 1955 |
| The $64,000 Question | 1955 |
| The Jackie Gleason Show | 1961 |
| Valentine's Day | 1964 |
| Honey West | 1965 |
| Burke's Law | 1965 |
| The Farmer's Daughter | 1965 |
| The Man from U.N.C.L.E. | 1965–66 |
| Mister Roberts | 1965–66 |
| That Girl | 1966–67 |
| The Green Hornet | 1966–67 |
| F Troop | 1966–67 |
| Judd, for the Defense | 1967 |
| Lost in Space | 1967 |
| The Family Game | 1967 |
| Insight | 1967–74 |
| Hawaii Five-O | 1968 |
| The Good Guys | 1969 |
| The Virginian | 1969–70 |
| C.C. and Company | 1970 |
| Matt Lincoln | 1970 |
| Mannix | 1970 |
| Mission: Impossible | 1970 |
| Dan August | 1971 |
| Room 222 | 1971–72 |
| Cannon | 1971–74 |
| The F.B.I. | 1972–74 |
| Marco | 1973 |
| The Streets of San Francisco | 1973–75 |
| Barnaby Jones | 1973–79 |
| Kojak | 1974 |
| Kolchak: The Night Stalker | 1975 |
| Ellery Queen | 1975–76 |
| The Feather and Father Gang | 1976–77 |
| Police Story | 1976–77 |
| The Andros Targets | 1977 |
| The Best of Families | 1977 miniseries |
| Wonder Woman | 1977–78 |
| The Paper Chase | 1978 |
| Switch | 1978 |
| Hart to Hart: Murder Between Friends | 1979 |
| Mrs. Columbo | 1979 |
| Trapper John, M.D. | 1980–82 |
| Remington Steele | 1983–87 |
| Murder, She Wrote | 1984–89 |
| Sledge Hammer! | 1987 |
| Matlock | 1989 |
| Father Dowling Mysteries | 1990 |
