= Ningen Gyorai Kaiten =

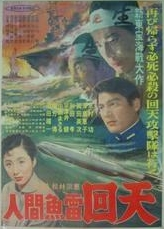
- Japanese movie poster
- Directed by: Shūe Matsubayashi
- Written by: Katsuya Susaki (writer)
- Produced by: Shintoho
- Cinematography: Rokuro Nishigaki
- Music by: Akira Ifukube
- Distributed by: Shintoho
- Release date: 9 January 1955 (Japan)
- Running time: 87 minutes
- Country: Japan
- Language: Japanese

Ningen Gyorai Kaiten (Japanese: 人間魚雷回天; lit. Human-Steered Torpedo Kaiten) is a 1955 black-and-white Japanese film directed by Shūe Matsubayashi.

== Cast ==
- Eiji Okada as Asakura
- Isao Kimura as Tamai
- Keiko Tsushima as Manabe
- Taiji Tonoyama as Ueno
- Toshio Takahara as Kwamura
- Ken Utsui as Murase
- Masaya Takahashi
