= Marco (1973 film) =

1973 film

- Theatrical release poster
- Directed by: Seymour Robbie
- Written by: Romeo Muller
- Produced by: Jules Bass; Arthur Rankin Jr. Kikumaru Okuda
- Starring: Desi Arnaz Jr. Jack Weston; Zero Mostel
- Cinematography: Rokurô Nishigaki
- Music by: Maury Laws
- Production companies: Tomorrow Entertainment; Videocraft International; Toho
- Distributed by: Cinerama Releasing Corporation
- Release date: December 21, 1973
- Running time: 109 minutes
- Countries: United States; Japan
- Language: English

Marco is a 1973 American-Japanese historical musical adventure film directed by Seymour Robbie and starring Desi Arnaz Jr., Jack Weston and Zero Mostel, which depicts the 13th century journey of Italian merchant and explorer Marco Polo along the Silk Road and his meeting with Kublai Khan.

It has been described as unreleased in the United States., released as a television movie, or as a theatrical release.

On December 9, 1972, Arnaz appeared on The Tonight Show with Johnny Carson to promote the film. His romantic partner Liza Minnelli had traveled to Tokyo with him during the filming.

== Cast ==
- Desi Arnaz Jr. as Marco Polo
- Jack Weston as Maffio Polo
- Zero Mostel as Kublai Khan
- Cie Cie Win as Aigiarm
- Aimee Eccles as Kuklatoi
- Fred Sadoff as Niccolo Polo
- Mafumi Sakamoto as Letanpoing
- Tetsu Nakamura as Sea Captain
- Van Christie as Chontosai
- Osamu Okawa as Ling Su
- Masumi Okada as Ti Wai
- Romeo Muller as Pitai Brahmas
- Yuka Kamebuchi as Mme. Tung
- Ikio Sawamura as Lomar

== Bibliography ==
- Jerry Roberts. Encyclopedia of Television Film Directors. Scarecrow Press, 2009.
