= Storm Over the Pacific =

- Yugoslav film poster
- Directed by: Shūe Matsubayashi
- Written by: Shinobu Hashimoto; Takeo Kunihiro
- Produced by: Tomoyuki Tanaka
- Starring: Yosuke Natsuki; Toshiro Mifune
- Cinematography: Kazuo Yamada
- Edited by: Kôichi Iwashita
- Music by: Ikuma Dan
- Production company: Toho
- Distributed by: Toho
- Release date: April 26, 1960
- Running time: 118 minutes
- Country: Japan
- Language: Japanese

Storm Over the Pacific (Japanese: ハワイ・ミッドウェイ大海空戦 太平洋の嵐, Hepburn: Hawai Middouei daikaikusen: Taiheiyo no arashi) (literally, Hawaii-Midway Battle of the Sea and Sky: Storm in the Pacific Ocean) is a 1960 Eastmancolor Japanese war film directed by Shūe Matsubayashi. The story is an account of a young Japanese bombardier, Lt. Koji Kitami (Yosuke Natsuki) stationed aboard the Hiryu and his participation in two battles in the Pacific during World War II, the attack on Pearl Harbor and the Battle of Midway.

Storm Over the Pacific was the first color widescreen war film from Toho Studios. The film was made by many of the same individuals behind the Godzilla franchise, such as producer Tomoyuki Tanaka, special effects director Eiji Tsuburaya, and assistant special effects director Teruyoshi Nakano. Storm Over the Pacific was released in 1961 in the United States in a dubbed and abridged 98 minute version produced by Hugo Grimaldi as I Bombed Pearl Harbor.

Some special effects scenes were later incorporated as stock footage in the 1976 film Midway (which also stars Toshirō Mifune).

== Plot ==
In 1941, Lt. Koji Kitami (Yosuke Natsuki) is a young Japanese bombardier, stationed aboard the Hiryu. On 1 December 1941, a Japanese fleet of 30 warships sails for Hawaii. When diplomatic negotiations in Washington fail, the task force commander, Adm. Tamon Yamaguchi (Toshiro Mifune) receives orders to attack Pearl Harbor. On December 7, the surprise attack is carried out successfully.

Following the attack on Pearl Harbor, Koji returns to Japan and his childhood sweetheart, Keiko (Misa Uehara). Although deeply in love with Keiko, Koji fears that marriage will make him less worthy as a naval officer.

His faith in his leaders and his country remains strong through the successful campaigns of the early war, but is severely shaken by the disastrous events during the Battle of Midway, learning that reports back to the homeland are lies. In the battle, his carrier Hiryu is attacked by U.S. dive bombers and badly damaged. High-ranking officers order the ship abandoned, but rather than leave it as a prize of war, a Japanese destroyer is given instructions to sink the carrier. As the Hiryu goes down, Koji and others give a final salute.

== Cast ==
Actor	Role	English voice actor
Yosuke Natsuki	Lt. Koji Kitami	Marvin Miller
Toshiro Mifune	Tamon Yamaguchi	Paul Frees
Makoto Sato	Lt. Matsuura	
Kōji Tsuruta	Lt. Tomonari	Paul Frees
Misa Uehara	Keiko	Virginia Gregg
Takashi Shimura	Tosaku	Marvin Miller
Jun Tazaki	Hiryu Captain Tomeo Kaku	
Akihiko Hirata	Officer	
Hiroshi Koizumi	Pilot	
Susumu Fujita	Isoroku Yamamoto	

== Production ==
Film historian Stephen Pendo in Aviation in the Cinema (1985) noted Storm Over the Pacific heavily utilized models to create realistic battle scenes. The special effects were supervised by Eiji Tsuburaya who was renown for his work in numerous 1950s and 1960s Japanese horror and science fiction films. During his 50-year career as a special effects director, Tsuburaya worked on approximately 250 films in total.

In World War II, Tsuburaya had created the realistic attack scenes in Hawai Mare oki kaisen (The War at Sea from Hawaii to Malaya) (1942) that depicted the Pearl Harbor attacks. The same model scene was reprised for Storm Over the Pacific. Tsuburaya and his special effects team created 136 ship models for Storm Over the Pacific, including Japanese aircraft carrier Akagi and USS Yorktown aircraft carriers, 11 and 13 metres respectively. The 1/16th scale models of ships were shot in a large water tank.

The miniature photography in Storm Over the Pacific was subsequently re-used in a number of later films, including Midway (1976) and the Japanese films Admiral Yamamoto (1968) and The Imperial Navy (1981).

== Reception ==
When Storm Over the Pacific was released, it met with critical approvals and was widely recognized as "telling the other side" or giving the Japanese perspective of World War II in the Pacific. Film historians Jack Hardwick and Ed Schnepf, however, dismissed the English version, I Bombed Pearl Harbor (1961) as poorly dubbed and with the predominance of "miniatures", as a pallid rival to Tora! Tora! Tora! (1970).
