= Imperial Navy (film) =

1981 film

- Film poster
- Directed by: Shue Matsubayashi
- Screenplay by: Katsuya Susaki
- Produced by: Tomoyuki Tanaka
- Starring: Keiju Kobayshi; Toshiyuki Nagashima; Kenichi Kaneda
- Cinematography: Katsuhiro Kato
- Music by: Shinji Tanimura; Katsuhisa Hattori
- Production companies: Toho; Toho-Eizo
- Distributed by: Toho
- Release date: 28 November 1981 (Japan)
- Running time: 145 minutes
- Country: Japan

Imperial Navy (Japanese: 連合艦隊, Hepburn: Rengo kantai) is a 1981 Japanese war film directed by Shue Matsubayashi. The film is a retelling of the downfall of Japan's Imperial Navy during World War II.

== Plot ==
In 1940, despite the opposition of the commander-in-chief of the Combined Fleet, Admiral Isoroku Yamamoto (Keiju Kobayashi) and other officers, Japan signs the Tripartite Pact with Nazi Germany and Fascist Italy as it prepares for expansion in Southeast Asia. Masato Odagiri, son of shipwright Takeichi Odgairi, graduates from the Imperial Japanese Naval Academy. A year later, his friend, Eiichi Hongo, is promoted to naval lieutenant.

During the attack on Pearl Harbor, Eiichi is in the raid as part of a Val dive bomber crew from the aircraft carrier Zuikaku. The raid is a success, but is tempered by the absence of the American carrier fleet. In February 1942, the battleship Yamato is designated as Yamamoto's flagship, and Takeichi is drafted as a reservist. He is assigned to the ship as a launch pilot.

Not long afterwards, the Americans launch a counterstrike on Japan in the Doolittle Raid. Following this, Yamamoto assembles the Kido Butai in order to mount a massive naval strike at Midway, but the Japanese carrier force is met and sunk by the US carriers. Several months later, after the Guadalcanal campaign, Yamamoto is assassinated as American pilots intercept and shoot down his plane. Eiichi returns home to Japan and marries his fiancée, but is soon recalled to participate in the Battle of Leyte Gulf. Off Cape Engaño, the Zuikaku is sunk, and Eiichi is among the casualties as he had given his life jacket to Shinji, Masato's younger brother, who was assigned to the ship as a navigator. Elsewhere, the Yamato, now serving as the flagship of Takeo Kurita's Center Force, withdraws from Leyte without having engaged in battle.

In April 1945, the Yamato is assigned to participate in Operation Ten-Go, a suicide mission to Okinawa. Shinji has also been reassigned to serve on the battleship. Masato, now a kamikaze pilot, is also due to participate, and asks Shinji to stay with Takeichi during the battle. As the Yamato and her accompanying fleet sails down to Okinawa, it is intercepted by American planes and sunk with heavy loss of life. Shinji and Takeichi are both killed in battle. Masato observes the sinking, while contemplating on his own death. The film ends on a scene of Eiji's wife, child, and father playing on a beach as the credits roll.

== Cast ==
- Keiju Kobayashi as Isoroku Yamamoto
- Toshiyuki Nagashima as Eiichi Hongo
- Nobuo Kaneko as Chūichi Nagumo
- Eitaro Ozawa as Osami Nagano
- Hiroyuki Nagato as Takeda
- Ichiro Nakatani as Kōsaku Aruga
- Toru Abe as Takeo Kurita
- Kei Satō as Shigenori Kami
- Jun Tazaki as Soemu Toyoda
- Yoshitaka Tamba as Mogi
- Yūko Kotegawa as Yoko Hongo
- Kenichi Kaneda as Shinji Hongo
- Junkichi Orimoto as Obayashi
- Takuya Fujioka as Shigeru Fukudome
- Kōji Takahashi as Matome Ugaki
- Kiichi Nakai as Masato Odagiri
- Akihiko Hirata as Shimoda
- Tomoko Naraoka as Utako Hongo
- Susumu Fujita as Koshirō Oikawa
- Tatsuya Mihashi as Ryūnosuke Kusaka
- Tetsurō Tamba as Jisaburō Ozawa
- Kōji Tsuruta as Seiichi Ito (special appearance)
- Hisaya Morishige as Naoki Hongo

== Release ==
Imperial Navy was released theatrically in Japan where it was distributed by Toho on 8 August 1981. The film was the highest grossing domestic production in Japan in 1981. The film was released in the United States by Toho International on 28 November 1983. It was released to home video by Sony with an English-language dub.

== Historical accuracy ==
While the film is generally accurate in its portrayal of the Pacific War, two inaccuracies occur during the Battle of Leyte sequence. In the film, the Center Force is seen withdrawing from battle at the San Bernardino Strait. In fact, it had engaged the Taffy 3 unit of the Seventh Fleet for two hours off Samar before withdrawing from the battle; in addition, the sequence in which the Zuikaku is sunk was reversed with the withdrawal.

== See also ==
- List of Japanese films of 1981
