= Akihiko Hirata =

Japanese actor (1927–1984)

- 平田昭彦
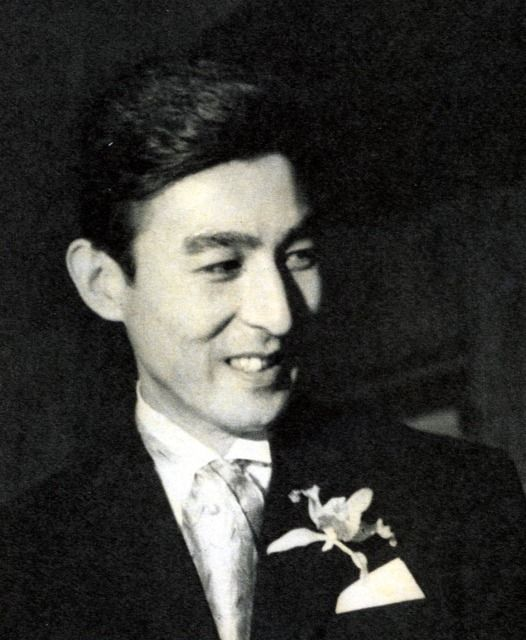
- Hirata in 1957
- Born: Akihiko Onoda; December 26, 1927; Seoul, Korea, Empire of Japan
- Died: July 25, 1984 (aged 56); Tokyo, Japan
- Occupation: Actor
- Years active: 1953–1984
- Notable credit: Dr. Daisuke Serizawa in Godzilla
- Spouse: Yoshiko Kuga (m. 1961)

Akihiko Onoda (小野田昭彦, Onoda Akihiko; December 16, 1927 – July 25, 1984), known professionally as Akihiko Hirata (平田昭彦, Hirata Akihiko), was a Japanese film actor.

He is known for his work in the kaiju genre, including such films as King Kong vs. Godzilla, The Mysterians, Godzilla vs. Mechagodzilla, Terror of Mechagodzilla, and his most famous role of Dr. Daisuke Serizawa, the brilliant but disturbed young scientist in the original Godzilla, released in 1954. He starred in many movies, including two out of the three films of Hiroshi Inagaki's Samurai Trilogy.

== Early life ==
Hirata was born in Seoul, Korea, in 1927, into a wealthy family. He was educated at the prestigious Tokyo University's School of Law. Before joining Shintoho as an assistant director (under his older brother, Yoshiki Onoda), Hirata moved into still photography, and eventually joined Toho in 1953, under the studio's "New Face" program, which would lead to his casting in Godzilla (although Hirata was originally intended for the part of Ogata, eventually played by another genre regular, Akira Takarada).

== Career ==
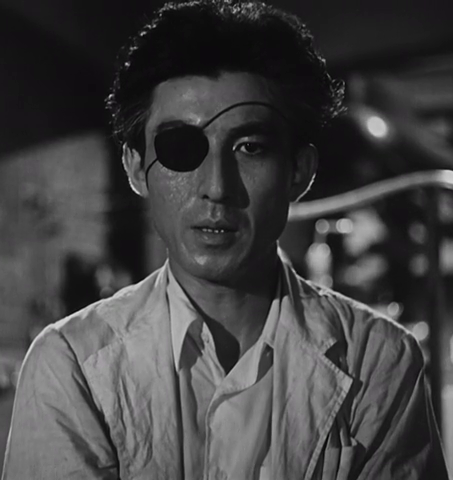
Hirata as Daisuke Serizawa in Godzilla (1954)

Hirata's film debut came in 1953, with The Last Embrace. Hirata would go on to play everything from snarling villains to government officials. His long face and intense features have earned the actor a cult following. Although Hirata earned lasting fame with his part in Godzilla, the role also typecast him, and the actor would go on to star in over 20 other sci-fi fantasy films for Toho among them The H-Man, Gorath, and Prophecies of Nostradamus, as well as an important recurring role in the original Ultraman series. In both his first and final appearances in a Godzilla film, Hirata played mysterious and disturbed scientists, as Hirata took on the role of the tragic Dr. Mafune in 1975's Terror of Mechagodzilla.

Hirata's association with the kaiju genre continued right until his death, as he helped announce the production of The Return of Godzilla at a Tokyo press conference, but unfortunately Hirata was too ill to appear in the film, and the part would eventually go to Yosuke Natsuki, who had appeared alongside Hirata in Ghidorah, the Three-Headed Monster in 1964. Hirata's final film role was in the 1984 film Sayonara Jupiter.

== Personal life and death ==
Hirata was married to actress Yoshiko Kuga from 1961 until his death.

On July 25, 1984, Hirata died from lung cancer at the age of 56.

== Selected filmography ==
=== Film ===
- The Last Embrace (1953) as Yamaoka, alias Sandaime
- Pu-san (1953)
- Girls Amongst the Flowers (1953) as Takamaro Kitaôji
- Even the Mighty Shed Tears (1953)
- Farewell Rabaul (1954) as First lieutenant Noguchi
- Itsuko to sono haha (1954) as Kozo Miyoshi
- Samurai I: Musashi Miyamoto (1954) as Seijuro Yoshioka
- Godzilla (1954) as Dr. Daisuke Serizawa
- Sanjusan go sha otonashi (1955)
- Samurai II: Duel at Ichijoji Temple (1955) as Seijūrō Yoshioka
- The Lone Journey (1955) as Horikoshi no Masakichi
- Natsume Sôseki no Sanshirô (1955) as Sugimoto
- Kaettekita wakadan'na (1955) as Mochizuki
- Kuro-obi sangokushi (1956) as Shunsuke Iba
- Godzilla, King of the Monsters! (1956) as Dr. Serizawa
- Furyô shônen (1956)
- Harikiri shacho (1956)
- Ani to sono musume (1956) as Michio
- Nisshokû no natsu (1956)
- Rodan (1956) as Professor Kyouichiro Kashiwagi
- Taian kichijitsu (1957)
- Arashi no naka no otoko (1957)
- Ôban (1957)
- Nemuri Kyôshirô burai hikae dainibu (1957)
- Ninjitsu (1957) as Tomonori
- Wakare no chatsumi-uta (1957)
- Waga mune ni niji wa kiezu (1957) as Tokuoka
- Koto no tsume (1957)
- Zoku Ôban: Fûun hen (1957) as Count Arishima
- Saigo no dasso (1957) as Son
- Wakare no chatsumi-uta shimai-hen: Oneesan to yonda hito (1957)
- Kottaisan yori: Nyotai wa kanashiku (1957) as Sashichi
- Zokuzoku Ôban: Dotô hen (1957) as Arishima
- The Mysterians (1957) as Ryōichi Shiraishi
- Yagyû bugeichô: Sôryû hiken (1958) as Tomonori
- Kiuchi yasuto (1958)
- Kanai anzen (1958) as Yôtarô Ibuki
- The H-Man (1958) as Inspector Tominaga
- Hitokui ama (1958) as Detective Makino
- Hana no bojô (1958) as Seigetsu Izumida
- Josei SOS (1958)
- Varan the Unbelievable (1958) as Dr. Fujimura
- Ankokugai no kaoyaku (1959)
- Daigaku no oneechan (1959) as Iwafune
- Aru kengo no shogai (1959) as Akaboshi
- Submarine I-57 Will Not Surrender (1959)
- Sengoku gunto-den (1959) as Jiro Hidekuni
- The Three Treasures (1959) as Kibino Takehiko
- The Last Gunfight (1960) as Susumu Tendo, the killer
- Kuroi gashû: Aru sarariman no shôgen (1960)
- Sarariman shussetai kôki daigobu (1960)
- The Secret of the Telegian (1960) as Detective Kobayashi
- Dâisan hâtobanô kêtto (1960)
- Storm Over the Pacific (1960) as an Officer
- Daigaku no sanzôkutachi (1960) as Marukyû Department Store Manager
- Man Against Man (1960) as Torimi
- Dokuritsu gurentai nishi-e (1960)
- 'Minagoroshi no uta' yori kenjû-yo saraba! (1960) as Kozo Kinugawa
- The Story of Osaka Castle (1961) as Hayatonosho (Hayato) Susukida
- Ankokugai no dankon (1961)
- Nasake muyo no wana (1961) as Morishima
- Kaoyaku akatsukini shisu (1961)
- Ai to honoho to (1961) as Kyo Sawada
- Dangai no ketto
- Mothra (1961) as Doctor
- Kurenai no umi (1961)
- Onna bakari no yoru (1961)
- Kuroi gashû dainibu: Kanryû (1961)
- Sanjuro (1962) as Samurai
- Gorath (1962) as Spaceshop Otori [J-X Eagle] Captain Endo
- Dobunezumi sakusen (1962)
- King Kong vs. Godzilla (1962) as Doctor Shigesawa
- Yama-neko sakusen (1962)
- Wakai kisetsu (1962)
- Chūshingura: Hana no Maki, Yuki no Maki (1962) as Yasoemon Okajima
- Varan the Unbelievable (1962) as Observer
- Ankokugai no kiba (1962)
- Ai no uzu shio (1962)
- Attack Squadron! (1963) as Senda's Aide
- Onna ni tsuyoku naru kufû no kazukazu (1963) as Rokusuke Sakai
- Nippon jitsuwa jidai (1963)
- Chintao yôsai bakugeki meirei (1963)
- Hawai no wakadaishô (1963)
- Norainu sakusen (1963)
- Eburi manshi no yûga-na seikatsu (1963)
- Atragon (1963) as Mu Agent #23
- Whirlwind (1964) as Ryutaro Inoue
- Kyô mo ware ôzora ni ari (1964)
- Garakuta (1964)
- Ghidorah, the Three-Headed Monster (1964) as Chief Detective Okita
- Samurai Assassin (1965) as Sohei Masui
- Ankokugai gekitotsu sakusen (1965) as Shimada
- Fûrai ninpôchô (1965)
- Taiheiyô kiseki no sakusen: Kisuka (1965) as Dr. Kudo
- Honkon no shiroibara (1965) as Asano
- 100 Shot, 100 Killed (1965) as Komori
- Baka to Hasami (1965)
- Musekinin Shimizu Minato (1965)
- Rise Against the Sword (1966) as Asakura
- Kiganjô no bôken (1966) as Chamberlain
- Ja ja umanarashi (1966)
- Doto ichiman kairi (1966) as Nozaki
- Ebirah, Horror of the Deep (1966) as Captain Yamoto
- The Killing Bottles (1967) as Man With Turkish Hat
- Japan's Longest Day (1967) as Commander Sugahara - 302nd Air Group
- Son of Godzilla (1967) as Fujisaki
- Ultraman (1968) as Professor Iwamoto
- Isoroku (1968) as Staff Officer Watanabe
- Dai bakuhatsu (1969) as W
- Latitude Zero (1969) as Dr. Sugata; Doctor of Latitude Zero
- Battle of the Japan Sea (1969) as Staff Officer Tsunoda
- Mito Kômon man'yûki (1969) as Geki Kurokawa
- Dai Nippon suri shûdan (1969) as Furansu
- Nagurikomi Shimizu Minato (1970)
- Kigeki: Makete tamaru ka! (1970)
- Gekido no showashi 'Gunbatsu' (1970) as Tomita (uncredited)
- Kigeki kinô no teki wa kyô mo teki (1971)
- Ningen kakumei (1973)
- Karei-naru Ichizoku (1974) (1974) as Haruta
- Godzilla vs. Mechagodzilla (1974) as Professor Hideto Miyajima
- Prophecies of Nostradamus (1974) as Environmental Scientist 1
- Terror of Mechagodzilla (1975) as Dr. Shinji Mafune
- Dômyaku rettô (1975) as Tanemura
- Ôzora no samurai (1976)
- Otoko wa tsurai yo: Torajirô to tonosama (1967) as Munemichi
- Kamen Rider X: Five Rider vs King Dark (1974) as Dr.

Wisut

- The War in Space (1977) as Commander Oishi, Japan Defence Forces
- Godzilla (1977) as Dr. Serizawa
- Ôgon no inu (1979) as Kan Aizawa
- Ah! Nomugi toge (1979) as Prince Fushiminomiya
- Ultraman: Great Monster Decisive Battle (1979)
- Port Arthur (1980) as Gaishi Nagaoka
- Imperial Navy (1981)
- Eki (1981)
- Chikagoro naze ka Charusuton (1981)
- Suparuta no umi (1983)
- Sayonara Jupiter (1984) as Doctor Inoue Ryutarou

=== Television ===
- Ultra Q (1966) as Chief Hanazawa
- Ultraman (1966-1967) as Dr. Iwamoto
- Ultraseven (1967) as Staff Officer Yanagawa
- Taiyō ni Hoero! (1972–83) as Takayuki Nishiyama(Semi-regular)
- Warrior of Love Rainbowman (1972) AS Mr. K
- Shinsho Taikōki (1973) as Hosokawa Fujitaka
- Onihei Hankachō (1975) as Kyōgoku Bizen
- Daitetsujin 17 (1977) as Captain Gomez
- Kusa Moeru (1979) as Yoshiyasu Ichijo
