= List of Japanese films of 1957 =

A list of films released in Japan in 1957 (see 1957 in film).

Japanese films released in 1957
Title	Director	Cast	Genre	Notes
Bokyaku no hanabira (kanketsu hen)	Toshio Sugie	Yoko Tsukasa, Hiroshi Koizumi, Mitsuko Kusabue	Drama	
Brothers of the Angry Waves	Toshio Shimura	Asao Matsumoto, Kikuko Hanaoka, Shôji Nakayama, Michiko Maeda	Crime	
The Blue Sky Maiden	Yasuzô Masumura	Ayako Wakao, Keizô Kawasaki, Kenji Sugawara	Comedy drama	
Chieko sho	Hisatora Kumagai	Setusko Hara, So Yamamura, Kyoko Aoyama	Drama	
Cordon at Dawn	Kiyoshi Komori	Shigeru Amachi, Takashi Wada, Yôichi Numata, Utako Mitsuya	Crime	
The Crowded Streetcar	Kon Ichikawa	Hiroshi Kawaguchi, Chishū Ryū	Drama	
Ghost-Cat of Yonaki Swamp	Katsuhiko Tasaka			
Ghost Ship	Teija Matsuda	Kinnosuke Nakamura, Ryutaro Otomo, Ryunosuke Tsukigata	—	
Godzilla, King of the Monsters!	Ishirō Honda	Raymond Burr, Momoko Kōchi, Akira Takarada		released in japan on May 29, 1957
Gojo oyaji pinboke musuko	Motoyoshi Oda	Kingoro Makino, Peggy Hayama, Ichiro Arishima	—	
Gojo oyaji to doremiha musume	Motoyoshi Oda	Kingoro Yanagiya, Peggy Hayama, Ichiro Arishima	—	
Hadaka no machi	Seiji Hisamatsu	Ryō Ikebe, Chikage Awashima, Keiko Awaji	—	
The Hole	Kon Ichikawa	Machiko Kyō, Eiji Funakoshi	Comedy	
I Am Waiting	Koreyoshi Kurahara	Yujiro Ishihara, Mie Kitahara	Crime	
Jun'ai monogatari	Tadashi Imai	Shinjirō Ehara	Crime	
Kisses	Yasuzō Masumura	Hiroshi Kawaguchi, Hitomi Nozoe, Aiko Mimasu, Eitaro Ozawa	Drama	
The Lower Depths	Akira Kurosawa	Toshirō Mifune, Isuzu Yamada, Ganjirō Nakamura	Drama	
The Military Policeman and the Dismembered Beauty	Kyotaro Namiki	Shoji Nakayama	Horror	
The Mysterians	Ishirō Honda	Kenji Sahara, Yumi Shirakawa, Momoko Kochi	Science Fiction	
Nijūkyū-nin no Kenka-jō	Kimiyoshi Yasuda	Raizo Ichikawa	Drama	
Nude Actress Murder Five Criminals	Teruo Ishii	Ken Utsui, Yōko Mihara	Crime	
On Wings of Love	Toshio Sugie	Hibari Misora, Chiemi Eri, Izumi Yukimura	Musical	
An Osaka Story	Kōzaburō Yoshimura	Raizo Ichikawa, Kyōko Kagawa	Drama	
Reign of Terror	Shigeaki Hidaka	Akira Takarada, Yumi Shirakawa, Kyoko Anzai	Crime	
Secret Scrolls (Part I)	Hiroshi Inagaki	Toshirō Mifune, Kōji Tsuruta, Yoshiko Kuga	—	
The Rice People	Tadashi Imai	Hitomi Nakahara, Isao Kimura	Drama	
Snow Country	Shirō Toyoda	Keiko Kishi, Ryō Ikebe, Kaoru Yachigusa	Drama	
Throne of Blood	Akira Kurosawa	Toshirō Mifune, Isuzu Yamada, Minoru Chiaki	Jidaigeki	
Tokyo Twilight	Yasujirō Ozu	Setsuko Hara, Isuzu Yamada, Chishū Ryū	Drama	
Untamed	Mikio Naruse	Hideko Takamine, Ken Uehara	Drama	
Wagamune no niji wa kiezu (dai ichibu)	Ishirō Honda	Akira Takarada, Momoko Kochi, Akemi Negishi	—	
Wakare no chatsumi uta	Ishirō Honda	Yoshio Kosugi, Chiyoko Shimakura, Chikage Ogi	—	
Warm Current	Yasuzô Masumura	Jun Negami, Sachiko Hidari, Hitomi Nozoe, Eiji Funakoshi	Drama	
Yellow Crow	Heinosuke Gosho	Chikage Awashima, Yūnosuke Itō	Drama	

== See also ==
- 1957 in Japan
