= Chieko Naniwa =

Japanese actress (1907–1973)

- 浪花千栄子
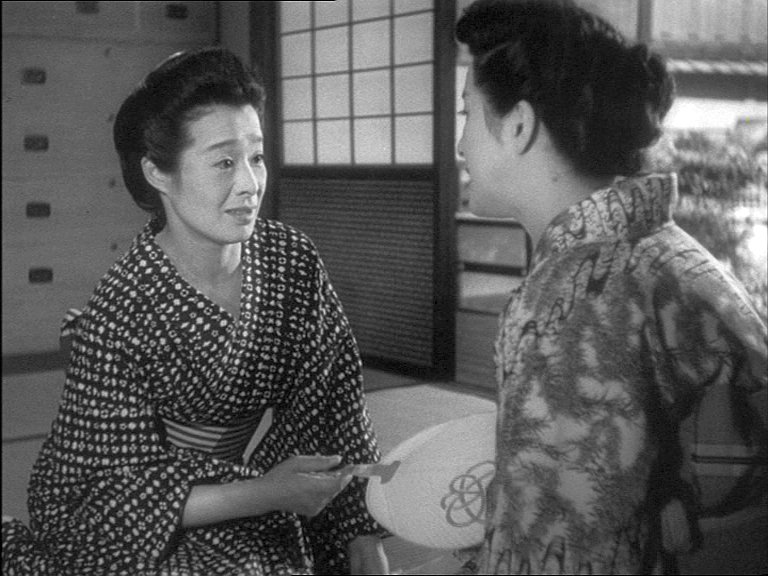
- Gion bayashi
- Born: November 19, 1907; Osaka, Japan
- Died: December 11, 1973 (aged 66); Tokyo, Japan
- Occupation: Actress

Chieko Naniwa (浪花 千栄子) (November 19, 1907 – December 22, 1973) was a Japanese actress who was active from the 1920s to the 1970s. She is best known for playing geisha in several films, such as Kenji Mizoguchi's A Geisha, and the Forest Spirit in Akira Kurosawa's Throne of Blood. Her birth name was Kikuno Nanko.

== Early life ==
Naniwa was born to poultry farmers in what is now Tondabayashi, Osaka, Japan on November 19, 1907. When she was 8 years old she began working at a bento shop in Dotonbori. After that she worked as a waitress in Kyoto until she was 18, when she entered a theater troupe.

== Career ==
She made her film debut in Itaro Yamagami's first film "Kaettekita eiyu". She obtained roles easily after that, working with famous film actors like Utaemon Ichikawa and Ichikawa Momonosuke. However, she cut ties with the film industry after troubles with unpaid wages.

In 1930 she joined Shibuya Tengai II and Soganoya Jugo's Shochiku theater. She married Shibuya that year. In 1948, Shibuya started his own theater called the Shochiku Shinkigeki, where Naniwa was the lead actress. Naniwa left the theater in 1951 after Shibuya had a child with another actress in the company.

Naniwa began performing in radio dramas. She also began appearing in films again, such as in Kenji Mizoguchi's A Geisha (1953), which won her a Blue Ribbon Award. She also performed with Hisaya Morishige in Meoto Zenzai (1955), in Akira Kurosawa's Throne of Blood (1957) and Yasujiro Ozu's Equinox Flower (1958).

She opened an inn in the Tenryu-ji, a temple in Kyoto's Arashiyama district. Shortly after opening the inn, she let Mizoguchi borrow it to film The Crucified Lovers (1954), and taught the star of the film, Kyoko Kagawa, how to act in a kimono.

Naniwa died of gastrointestinal bleeding on December 22, 1973. After her death she was posthumously awarded the Order of the Sacred Treasure.

== Filmography ==
=== Film performances ===
Year	Title	Role	Director(s)
1953	A Geisha	Okimi	Kenji Mizoguchi
1954	Sansho the Bailiff	Ubatake	Kenji Mizoguchi
1954	Twenty-Four Eyes	Restaurant owner	Keisuke Kinoshita
1954	The Crucified Lovers	Oko	Kenji Mizoguchi
1955	Meoto zenzai	Okin	Shirō Toyoda
1955	So Young, So Bright	Onobu	Toshio Sugie
1956	A Cat, Shozo, and Two Women	Orin	Shirō Toyoda
1957	On Wings of Love	Umeko Yoshioka	Toshio Sugie
1957	Throne of Blood	Forest Spirit	Akira Kurosawa
1957	An Osaka Story	Ofude	Kōzaburō Yoshimura
1957	Snow Country	Otatsu	Shirō Toyoda
1958	Sazae-san 4	Chie Nishino	Nobuo Aoyagi
1958	Equinox Flower	Hatsu Sasaki	Yasujirō Ozu
1959	Sazae-san 5	Chie Nishino	Nobuo Aoyagi
1959	Sazae-san 6	Chie Nishino	Nobuo Aoyagi
1960	Sazae-san 7	Chie Nishino	Nobuo Aoyagi
1961	The End of Summer	Tsune Sasaki	Yasujirō Ozu
1961	Akumyō	Ito Asō	Tokuzō Tanaka
1961	Zoku Akumyō	Ito Asō	Tokuzō Tanaka
1961	Girls of the Night	Kameju	Kinuyo Tanaka
1963	Twin Sisters of Kyoto	Teahouse owner	Noboru Nakamura
1967	The Doctor's Wife	Tami	Yasuzo Masumura

=== TV performances ===
Year	Title	Role	Notes
1965	Taikōki	Ōmandokoro	Taiga drama
1966	Zenigata Heiji	Omine	
1970	Osaka-jō no Onna	Ōmandokoro	
1973	Zenigata Heiji	Omasa	

== Selected bibliography ==
- Naniwa, Chieko (1965). 水のように [Like water]. 六芸書房.
