= Crazy Cats =

Japanese jazz band

Crazy Cats クレージーキャッツ
- Origin: Japan
- Genres: Jazz, Comic Song
- Years active: 1955–2023
- Past members: Ētarō Ishibashi (piano) Hajime Hana (drums); Hitoshi Ueki (vocals); Kei Tani (trombone); Hiroshi Inuzuka (bass); Senri Sakurai (piano); Shin Yasuda (tenor sax)

The Crazy Cats (Japanese: クレージーキャッツ, Hepburn: Kurējī Kyattsu) also known as Hajime Hana and the Crazy Cats (ハナ肇とクレージーキャッツ, Hana Hajime to Kurējī Kyattsu) were a Japanese jazz band and comedy group popular in film and television, particularly between the 1950s and 1970s. Led by Hajime Hana, the band's other main members were Kei Tani, Hitoshi Ueki, Hiroshi Inuzuka, Senri Sakurai, Shin Yasuda, and Ētarō Ishibashi.

== Band origins ==
The band was originally formed in 1955 at the end of the first jazz boom in Japan under the name The Cuban Cats. Signed to Watanabe Productions, their performances mixed music and comedic bits, in the spirit of Frankie Sakai and the City Slickers, and they soon changed their name to the Crazy Cats. At the end of the 1950s, the main members were Hana, Tani, Ueki, Inuzuka, Yasuda, and Ishibashi. Sakurai joined in 1960, and Ishibashi left in 1971.

The group became nationally famous after appearing on the television show "Otona No Manga" starting in 1959. Beginning in 1961, they co-starred on the variety show "Soap Bubble Holiday" ("Shabondama Horidē"), performing in skits written by Yukio Aoshima, who later became governor of Tokyo. Their 1961 song, "Sudara-Bushi," sung by Ueki, was a major hit and led to seven consecutive appearances on NHK's Kohaku Utagassen. Their popularity also led to a series of films produced at the Toho Studios, the most famous of which was the Musekinin Otoko or Irresponsible Man. The series of films featured Ueki as a salaryman attempting to advance up the corporate ladder.

== Influence ==
In terms of their music, E. Taylor Atkins has said that "The Crazy Cats are significant for capitalizing and purveying an image of jazz musicians as clownish, slang-slinging ne'er-do-wells. Their audience rewarded the Cats with the longevity of which very few Japanese acts could boast." Mark Anderson has written that their "film series, in particular, had a great impact on 1960s popular culture," and that "they remain emblematic of a group of entertainers made possible by the television era." J-pop singer-songwriter Gen Hoshino wrote his 2014 single "Crazy Crazy" as a homage to the band.

== Filmography ==
- Nippon musekinin jidai (1962) Director: Kengo Furusawa
- Let's Meet in Our Dreams (1962) Director: Kengo Furusawa
- Strategy First Win (1963) Director: Seiji Hisamatsu
- Irresponsible Crushed! (1963) Director: Takashi Tsuboshima
- Crazy Cats Go to Hong Kong (1963) Director: Toshio Sugie
- Irresponsible Yuden (1964) Director: Toshio Sugie
- The Crazy Adventure (1965) Director: Kengo Furusawa
- It's A Strange Heaven (1966) Director: Takashi Tsuboshima
- Operation Crazy (1966) Director: Kengo Furusawa
- Industrial Spy Free for All (1967) Director: Takashi Tsuboshima
- Las Vegas Free-for-All (1967) Director: Takashi Tsuboshima
- Monsieur Zivaco (1967) Director: Takashi Tsuboshima
- Mexican Free-for-All (1968) Director: Takashi Tsuboshima
- The Great Discovery (1969) Director: Kengo Furusawa
- The Big Explosion (1969) Director: Kengo Furusawa
- Be Deceived! (1971) Director: Takashi Tsuboshima

== See also ==
- Hisaya Morishige
- The Drifters (Japanese band)
