= Young People =

Young People may refer to:

- Young People (1937 Japanese film)
- Young People (1940 film), a 1940 American film
- Young People (1961 film), a 1961 Mexican film
- Young People (1972 film), a 1972 Hong Kong film
- The Young People, a 2026 American film
