= Akira Takarada =

Japanese actor (1934–2022)

- 宝田 明
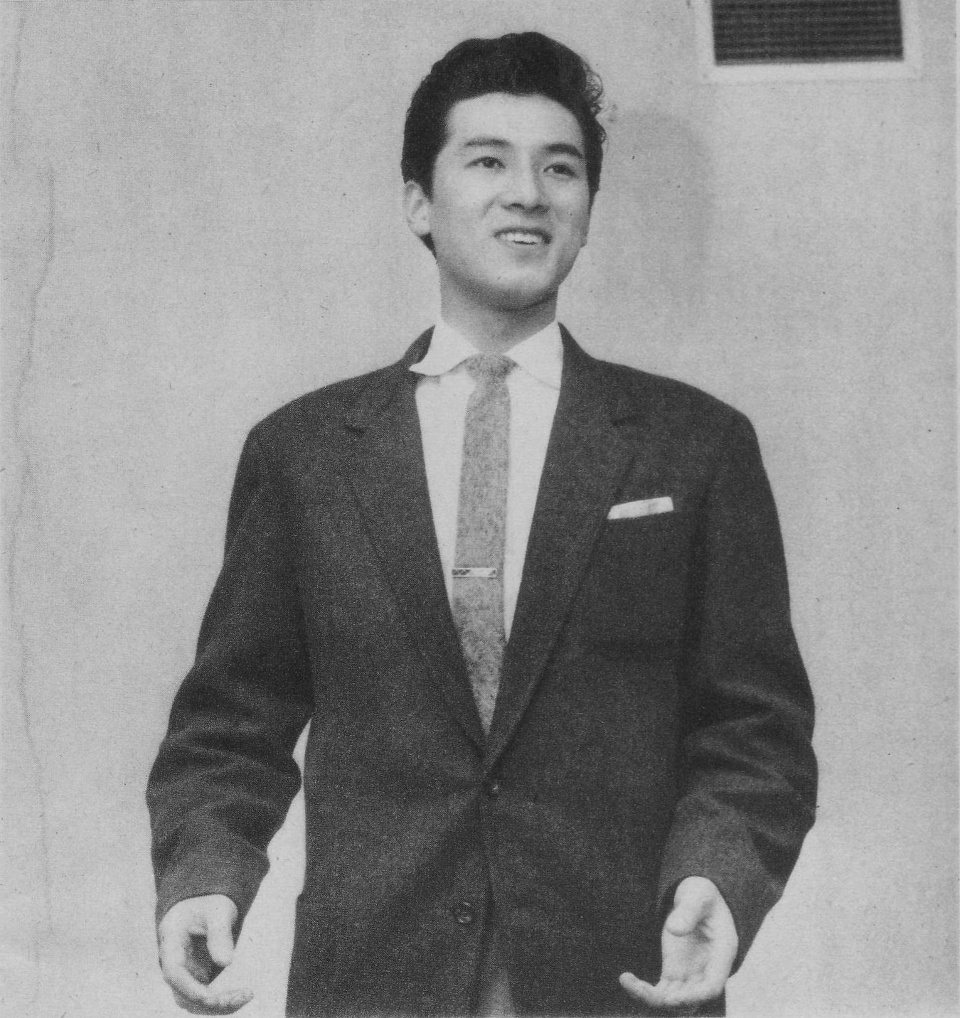
- Takarada in 1956
- Born: April 29, 1934; Chongjin, Kankyōhoku-dō, Japanese Korea (nowadays North Korea)
- Died: March 14, 2022 (aged 87); Tokyo, Japan
- Occupations: Actor, Tarento
- Years active: 1954–2022
- Spouse: Akiko Kojima (m. 1966; div. 1984)
- Children: 3, including Michiru Kojima (daughter)

Japanese name
- Kanji: 宝田 明
- Hiragana: たからだ あきら
- Romanization: Takarada Akira
- Website: akira-takarada.com

Akira Takarada (Japanese: 宝田 明, Hepburn: Takarada Akira; April 29, 1934 – March 14, 2022) was a Japanese actor best known for his roles in the Godzilla film series.

== Early life ==
Akira Takarada was born in Korea under Japanese rule, and lived for a time in Manchuria, China. His father worked as an engineer on the South Manchuria Railway. After the war, he remained in Harbin, and he was able to speak Mandarin Chinese and English.

== Acting career ==
Takarada moved to Allied-occupied Japan with his family in 1948. He joined Toho as part of their "New Face" program in April 1953. In his film debut, he had a small role in And Then the Liberty Bell Rang, a biography of the educator Fukuzawa Yukichi. His big break came when he was cast as navy diver Hideto Ogata in the original Godzilla (1954). He became a popular actor at Toho for his good looks and charismatic, sophisticated character. He continued his association with the Godzilla series in Mothra vs. Godzilla (1964), Invasion of Astro-Monster (1965), and Godzilla vs. the Sea Monster (1966). He returned to the series in 1992 with Godzilla vs. Mothra and appeared again in Godzilla: Final Wars (2004). Other Toho science-fiction/special-effects films in which he appeared include Half Human (1955), The Last War (1961), King Kong Escapes (1967), and Latitude Zero (1969).

Toho prepared a musical production of Gone with the Wind with Broadway composer-lyricist Harold Rome for its new Imperial Garden theatre in 1970. Entitled Scarlett, Takarada was originally scheduled to play the role of Rhett Butler. However, injuries sustained in an accident in which he fell off a bulldozer while filming prevented him from participating in this stage production.

Takarada made a guest appearance at the fan convention G-Fest XVII in 2010, and again at G-Fest XIX in July 2012, G-Fest XXIII in July 2016, and G-Fest XXVI in 2019. He received G-FEST's Mangled Skyscraper Award in 2010, and the G-FAN Lifetime Achievement Award in 2019. He has come to be known as "The Godfather of G-FEST." On March 27, 2013, Takarada posed for publicity photographs with director Gareth Edwards on the set of the Legendary/Warner Bros Godzilla reboot, suggesting a cameo of sorts in the new movie. His scenes were filmed, but ultimately cut from the movie. He is still listed in the movie credits.

== Filmography ==
=== Selected works ===
Year	Title	Role	Notes	Ref(s)
1954	And Then the Liberty Bell Rang	Sōtarō Masuda		
1954	Bride in a Bathing Suit	Masao Sakurai		
1954	Godzilla	Hideto Ogata		
1955	Half Human	Takeshi Iijima		
1956	Romantic Daughters	Kubota		
1957	On Wings of Love	narrator		
1957	Zoku Aoi sanmyaku Yukiko no maki	Tamao Memata		
1957	A Rainbow Plays in My Heart	Tatsuo Itō		
1958	A Holiday in Tokyo			
1959	The Three Treasures	Prince Wakatarashi		
1959	Life of an Expert Swordsman			
1960	Hawaii Midway Daikai Kūsan: Taiheiyō Noarashi	Communications officer		
1960	Daughters, Wives and a Mother			
1961	The Last War	Takano		
1961	Kohayagawa-ke no aki	Tadashi Teramoto		
1962	A Wanderer's Notebook	Kō Fukuchi		
1964	Mothra vs. Godzilla	News Reporter Ichirō Sakai		
1965	Ironfinger	Andrew Hoshino		
1965	Invasion of Astro-Monster	Astronaut K. Fuji		
1966	Ebirah, Horror of the Deep	Yoshimura		
1967	King Kong Escapes	Lieutenant Commander Jirō Nomura		
1968	Fancy Paradise	Kō Maeno		
1969	Latitude Zero	Doctor Ken Tashirō		
1990	Tales of a Golden Geisha	Inukai		
1992	Minbo	General Manager Kobayashi		
1992	Godzilla vs. Mothra	Jōji Minamino		
1996	Hissatsu! Mondo Shisu	Mizuno Tadakuni	Hissatsu series	
1997	Marutai no Onna	Police commissioner		
2000	Tales of the Unusual			
2004	Godzilla: Final Wars	Natarō Daigo		
2005	Fantastipo	Kintarō Koinobori		
2007	Glory to the Filmmaker!			
2014	Godzilla	Japanese Immigration Agent	Deleted scene	
2018	Ashita ni Kakeru Hashi			
2018	The Great Buddha Arrival	Storyteller		
2019	Dance with Me	Machin Ueda		
2022	Life in Bloom	Keizō		

=== Television ===
==== Television drama ====
- Shiratori Reiko de Gozaimasu! (1993) (Shōtarō Hakuchō)
- Tokugawa Yoshinobu (1998) (Takatsukasa Masamichi)
- Watashi no Aozora (2000) (Jōji Murai)
- Shōtoku Taishi (2001) (Mononobe no Moriya)
- Rokkā no Hanako-san (2002) (Kaichō Tatsumi)
- Clouds Over the Hill (2009) (Fujino Susumu)
- Carnation (2011) (Seizaburō Matsuzaka)
- Keisei Saimin no Otoko Part 3 (2015) (Ikeda Shigeaki)

=== Dubbing roles ===
==== Live action ====
- The Ambushers (Matt Helm)
- Cats (Gus "Asparagus" the Theatre Cat (Ian McKellen))
- Doctor Dolittle (Doctor Dolittle)
- Murderers' Row (Matt Helm)

==== Animation ====
- Aladdin (1992) (Jafar)
  - The Return of Jafar
- Disney's House of Mouse (Ratigan, Jafar)
- Disney's The Great Mouse Detective (Ratigan)
- Star Wars Rebels Season 3 (Bendu)

=== Video games ===
- Adventure of Tokyo Disney Sea ~Losing of Jewel's Secret (Jafar)
- Kingdom Hearts (2002) (Jafar)
- Kingdom Hearts II (2005) (Jafar)
- Kingdom Hearts Re:coded (2010) (Jafar)

=== Stage productions ===
- My Fair Lady
- South Pacific

=== Other ===
- Tokyo Disneyland attraction: Country Bear Jamboree (Henry)

== Personal life ==
In 1966, he married Japanese beauty queen Akiko Kojima. They had one daughter, Michiru, in 1967, and two sons. They divorced in 1984.

== Death ==
Takarada died on March 14, 2022 at a hospital in Tokyo, Japan from problems caused by pneumonia at the age of 87.

== Bibliography ==
- "AKIRA TAKARADA". Complete Index to World Film.
- Ryfle, Steve (1998). "Akira Takarada: Mr. Handsome". Japan's favorite mon-star: the unauthorized biography of "The Big G". Miami: ECW Press. pp. 94–95. ISBN 1-55022-348-8.
- Tanaka, Tomoyuki (1983). The Complete History of Toho Special Effects Movies (in Japanese). Toho Publishing Business Office. ISBN 4-924609-00-5.
- 宝田明 たからだ・あきら (in Japanese). allcinema.net.
- 宝田明 (in Japanese). Japanese Movie Database. Archived from the original on February 6, 2010.
- 宝田明( 出演 ) (in Japanese). Kinema Junpo. Archived from the original on March 24, 2012.
