= Hisaya Morishige =

Japanese actor and comedian (1913–2009)

Hisaya Morishige Junior Third Rank
- 森繁 久彌
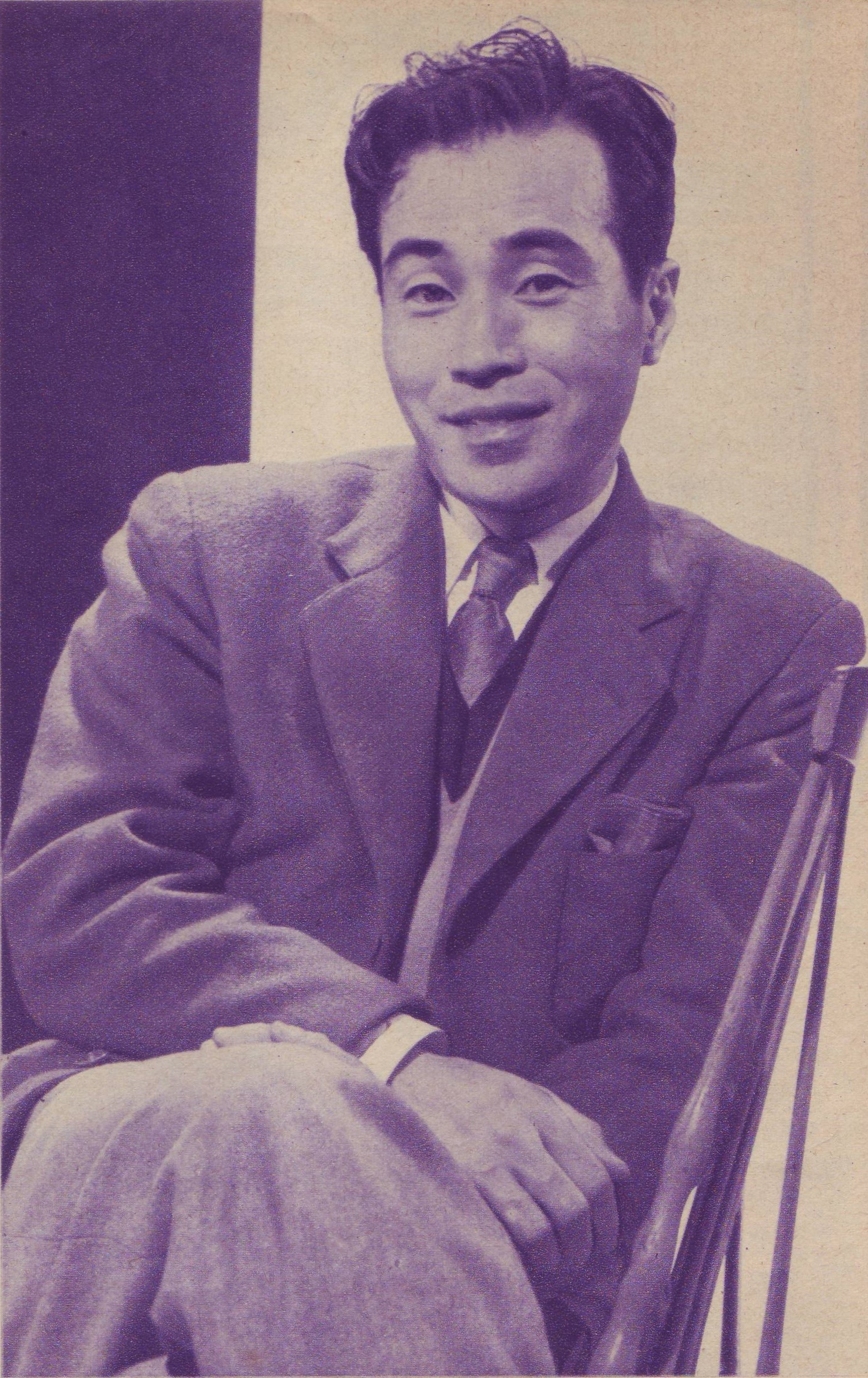
- Born: May 4, 1913; Hirakata, Osaka, Japan
- Died: November 10, 2009 (aged 96); Tokyo, Japan
- Other names: Jiji, Jijiya, Zachō, Za, Morishige, Shige-san
- Occupations: Actor, composer, lyricist, announcer
- Years active: 1936–2007
- Spouse: Masuko Morishige (m. ?–1989)
- Children: Tatsuru Morishige (b. 1942) Izumi Morishige (1940–1999)

Hisaya Morishige (森繁 久彌, Morishige Hisaya; May 4, 1913 – November 10, 2009) was a Japanese actor and comedian. Born in Hirakata, Osaka, he graduated from Kitano Middle School (now Kitano High School), and attended Waseda University. He began his career as a stage actor, then became an announcer for NHK, working in Manchukuo. He became famous in films first for comedy roles, appearing in series such as the "Company President" (Shacho) and "Station Front" (Ekimae) series, produced by Toho. He appeared in nearly 250 films, both contemporary and jidaigeki. He was also famous on stage playing Tevye in the Japanese version of Fiddler on the Roof. He also appeared in television series and specials, and was the first guest on the television talk show Tetsuko's Room in 1975. He was long-time head of the Japan Actors Union. Among many honors, Morishige received the Order of Culture from the Emperor of Japan in 1991.

Hisaya Morishige died of natural causes at a hospital in Tokyo on November 10, 2009, at the age of 96.

== Filmography ==
=== Film ===
| Year | Title | Role | Director | Notes |
|---|---|---|---|---|
| 1947 | Joyū | | Teinosuke Kinugasa | |
| 1955 | Keisatsu Nikki | Policeman Yoshii | Seiji Hisamatsu | Lead role |
| 1955 | Meoto zenzai | Ryukichi Koreyasu | Shirō Toyoda | Lead role |
| 1956 | Romantic Daughters | Morishita | Toshio Sugie | |
| 1956 | A Cat, Shozo, and Two Women | Shōzō | Shirō Toyoda | |
| 1956–71 | Company President series (40 films) | The company president | Shūe Matsubayashi and others | Lead role |
| 1957 | Snow Country | Imura | Shirō Toyoda | |
| 1958 | A Holiday in Tokyo | | Kajirō Yamamoto | |
| 1958 | The Tale of the White Serpent | All men characters (voice) | Taiji Yabushita | |
| 1958–69 | Ekimae series (24 films) | Tokunosuke Morita and others | Kozo Saeki and others | Lead role |
| 1961 | The End of Summer | Eiichirou Isomura | Yasujirō Ozu | |
| 1971 | Tora-san's Shattered Romance | Senzō | Yoji Yamada | |
| 1972 | Zatoichi at Large | Tōbei | Kazuo Mori | |
| 1978 | The Incident | Tamizō Kiyokawa | Yoshitarō Nomura | |
| 1980 | The Battle of Port Arthur | Itō Hirobumi | Toshio Masuda | |
| 1981 | Imperial Navy | Naoki Hongō | Shūe Matsubayashi | |
| 1983 | Shōsetsu Yoshida Gakkō | Shigeru Yoshida | Shirō Moritani | Lead role |
| 1984 | Sayonara Jupiter | Earth Federation President | Koji Hashimoto/Sakyo Komatsu | |
| 1990 | Ruten no umi | Kumago Matsuzaka | Buichi Saitō | Lead role |
| 1994 | 47 Ronin | Chisaka Takafusa | Kon Ichikawa | |
| 1997 | Princess Mononoke | Okkoto-nushi (voice) | Hayao Miyazaki | |
| 2001 | Doraemon: Nobita and the Winged Braves | Professor Torino (voice) | Tsutomu Shibayama | Special appearance |
| 2004 | Blooming Again | Rokusaburō Aoki | Isshin Inudo | Special appearance |

=== Television ===
| Year | Title | Role | Network | Notes |
|---|---|---|---|---|
| 1975 | Genroku Taiheiki | Tokugawa Mitsukuni | NHK | Taiga drama |
| 1975 | Ōoka Echizen | Dr. Yuzan Mikumo | TBS | |
| 1975–77 | Edo o Kiru | Tokugawa Nariaki | TBS | Special appearance |
| 1981 | Sekigahara | Tokugawa Ieyasu | TBS | Lead role, miniseries |
| 1986 | Byakkotai | Inoue Okazumi | NTV | Lead role |

=== Dubbing ===
| Year | Title | Role |
|---|---|---|
| 1986 | When the Wind Blows | Jim |
| 1997 | Hercules | Opening narrator |

== Songs ==
- Shiretoko Ryojō, a song about the Shiretoko Peninsula

== Writings ==
- Morishige, Hisaya (March 2003). Morishige Jiden [Autobiography of Morishige] (in Japanese). Chuo Koron Shinsha. ISBN 978-4122041844.

== Honours ==
- Medal with Purple Ribbon (1975)
- Person of Cultural Merit (1984)
- Order of the Precious Crown, 2nd Class, Peony (1987)
- Order of Culture (1991)
- Honorary citizen of Tokyo (1997)
- People's Honour Award (2009, Posthumous award)
- Junior Third Rank (2009, Posthumous award)
