= Hot Spring Ghost =

- Film poster
- Directed by: Kozo Saeki
- Screenplay by: Kihan Nagase
- Produced by: Ichiro Sato; Fumio Kanehara
- Starring: Hisaya Morishige; Junzaburo Ban; Frankie Sakai; Chikage Awashima
- Cinematography: Tokuzo Kuroda
- Music by: Kenjiro Hirose
- Production company: Tokyo Eiga
- Distributed by: Toho
- Release date: June 11, 1964 (Japan)
- Running time: 92 minutes
- Country: Japan
- Language: Japanese

Hot Spring Ghost (Japanese: 喜劇 駅前怪談, Hepburn: Kigeki Ekime kaidan) is a 1964 Japanese comedy film directed by Kozo Saeki. The film was the eighth film in the "Ekimae" series. It was followed by Mumu Dance in 1964. Hot Spring Ghost is a comedy about battling resort operators.

The film was released on June 11, 1964 in Japan. It was the distributor Toho's highest-grossing film of the year and the eight highest-grossing film of 1964 in Japan. The film was released in the United States by Toho International in 1965 with English subtitles.

== See also ==
- List of Japanese films of 1964
