= Sugie =

Sugie is a Japanese surname. Notable people with the surname include:

- Atsushi Sugie, Japanese astronomer and a discoverer of minor planets
  - 3957 Sugie, minor planet
- Toshio Sugie (1913–1996), Japanese film director
