= Haruyo Ichikawa =

Japanese actress (1913–2004)

Haruyo Ichikawa 市川春代
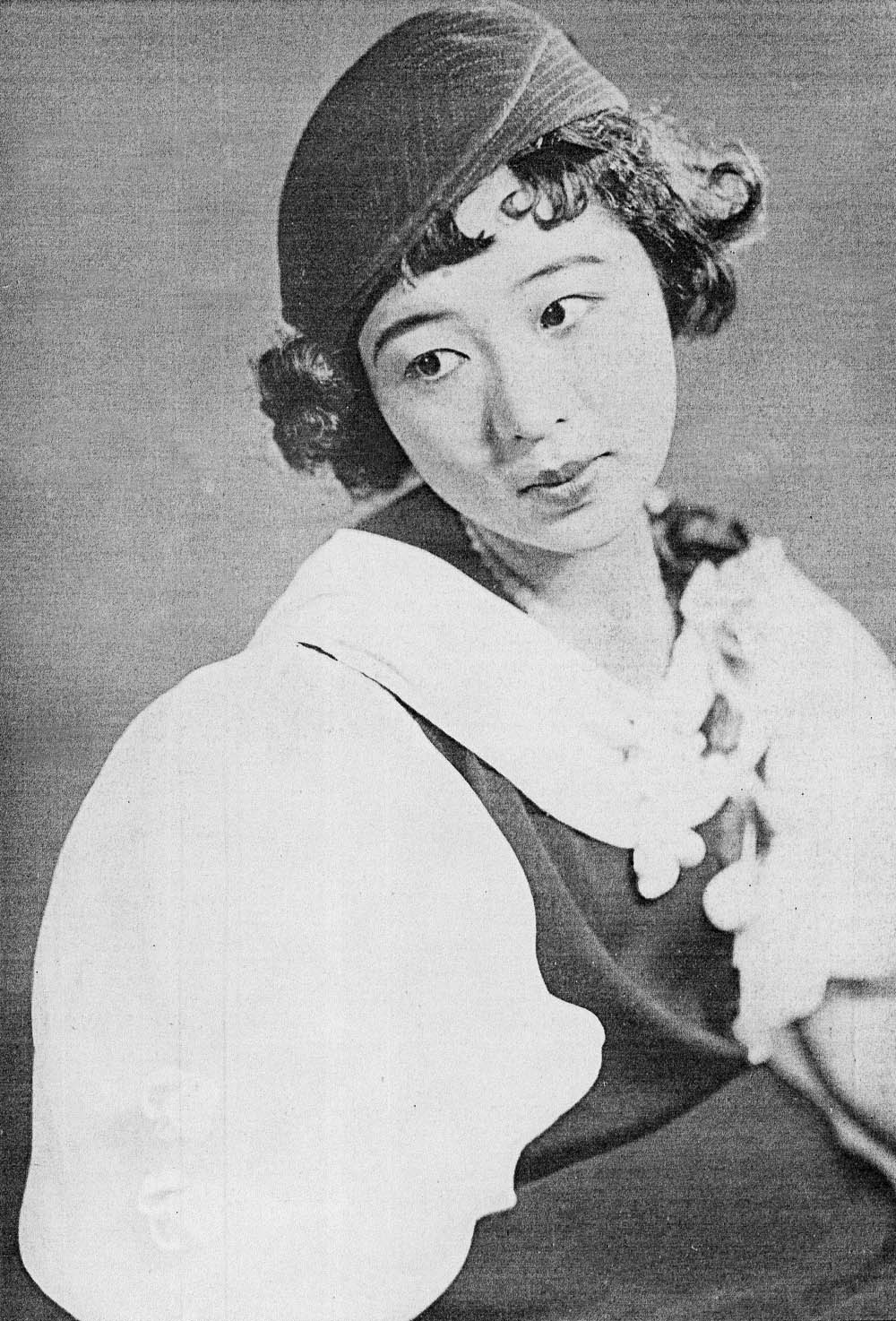
- Haruyo Ichikawa in 1934
- Born: 9 February 1913; Nagano, Japan
- Died: 18 November 2004 (aged 91); Kamakura, Kanagawa Prefecture, Japan
- Occupations: Actress, singer

Haruyo Ichikawa (市川春代, Ichikawa Haruyo; 9 February 1913 – 18 November 2004) was a Japanese film actress and singer.

== Career ==
Born in the city of Nagano, Ichikawa entered the Nikkatsu studios in 1926, where she gave her film debut in Miyako no seihoku. In the 1930s, she first moved to the Shinkō Kinema film company, then to Tokyo Hassei Eiga Seisakusho (later Toho), before returning to Nikkatsu. At Tokyo Hassei Eiga Seisakusho, she starred in a number of films by Shirō Toyoda, most notably Young People (1937).

After the war, Ichikawa appeared in smaller roles in films like Kenji Mizoguchi's The Life of Oharu (1952) and Keisuke Kinoshita's The Tattered Wings (1955). She continued acting until the 1960s, appearing in a total of over 180 films. She died on 18 November 2004 at the age of 91.

== Selected filmography ==
- The Daughter of the Samurai (1937)
- Young People (1937)
- Singing Lovebirds (1939)
- Hōrō no utahime (1950)
- The Life of Oharu (1952)
