= Maria Asahina =

Japanese singer (born 1962)

- 朝比奈 マリア
- Born: 15 March 1962 (age 64); Washington, D.C., U.S.
- Occupations: Singer; actress; painter
- Children: 1
- Mother: Izumi Yukimura
- Musical career
- Genres: Pop; fusion
- Instrument: Vocals
- Label: Alfa Music

Maria Asahina (朝比奈 マリア, Asahina Maria; born 15 March 1962) is a Japanese singer, actress, and painter. She released an album and single with Alfa Records in 1979, before releasing another tie-in single for the 1982 anime film Arcadia of My Youth. She also appeared as a television personality in variety shows and as an actress in dramas. She later became an oil painter who exhibited some of her work at Nikaten.

== Biography ==
Asahina was born on 15 March 1962, in Washington, D.C. Her parents were Jack Sellar, an American employee at the Latin Casino, and singer Izumi Yukimura. She remained in the United States while one year old after her parents returned to Japan before divorcing when she was three. She was educated at Seisen International School, but dropped out.

In 1977/1978, Asahina started her entertainer career in modeling, and her first job was appearing in a commercial for a fashion complex. She later became a television personality, appearing in several variety shows. She also appeared in television dramas and commercials.

In 1979, Asahina made her debut as a singer with her single "Disco Girl" and her album Maria. "Disco Gal" was composed by Koichi Sugiyama and used backing vocals from Tatsuro Yamashita and Minako Yoshida, while Maria involved the work of Haruomi Hosono, Riyoko Ikeda, Harvey Mason, Masataka Matsutoya, Ryuichi Sakamoto, and Ken Sato. Shishamo Ayanokoji of Reminder-top said that "Disco Gal" fell into obscurity due to its nature as a "novelty act". She performed two insert songs for the 1982 anime film Arcadia of My Youth: "Hoshizora no Last Song" and "Taiyō wa Shinanai"; the latter was released as her second and final single that same year.

Inspired by her mother, Asahina started oil painting and exhibited some of them at the Nikaten exhibitions. In September 1983, one of her oil paintings "Pinku no Umafuku" (ピンクの馬服; lit. "Pink horse rug") was disqualified from the Nikaten for being a reproduction of a photograph. She also works as an accessory designer, by 2010 she was regularly hosting workshops teaching beaded accessory design.

Asahina's music returned to popularity following the city pop wave of the 2010s and 2020s, particularly "Disco Girl". Her album was re-released as part of the Aldelight City Pop Collection in November 2022, and her song "Kokoro no Mama ni" appeared on the album City Pop Stories: '70s & '80s (2024).

In 1985, Asahina married a television producer who worked with TBS Television; they had one son, born in 1988. She also a fan of The Rose of Versailles, having attended the manga's 40th anniversary exhibition at Matsuya Ginza in 2012.

== Discography ==
=== Albums ===
Title	Details
Maria (stylized in all-caps)	Released: 1979; Label: Alfa Records

=== Singles ===
Title	Details
"Disco Gal" (ディスコ・ギャル)	Released: 1979; Label: Alfa Records
"Arcadia of My Youth: Taiyō wa Shinanai/Hoshizora no Last Song" (「わが青春のアルカディア」 太陽は死なない/星空のラストソング)	Released: 1982; Label: Nippon Columbia

== Filmography ==
List of acting performances in live-action
Year	Title	Role	Source
1979-1980	Ai		
1980	Shiawase Sensō		
1982	Hana no Kage		
1983	Fūfu no Haru	Ai Sakabe	
1983	Hahatoko no Kokuin		
