= Marital Relations =

1955 film by Shirō Toyoda

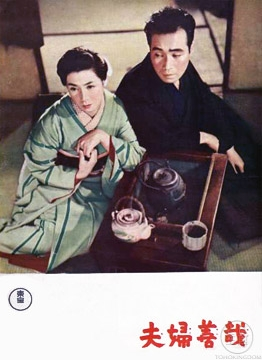
- Japanese movie poster
- Directed by: Shirō Toyoda
- Written by: Toshio Yasumi; Sakunosuke Oda (novel)
- Produced by: Ichiro Sato
- Starring: Hisaya Morishige; Chikage Awashima
- Cinematography: Mitsuo Miura
- Edited by: Kōichi Iwashita
- Music by: Ikuma Dan
- Production company: Toho
- Distributed by: Toho
- Release date: September 13, 1955 (Japan)
- Running time: 120 minutes
- Country: Japan
- Language: Japanese

Marital Relations (Japanese: 夫婦善哉, Hepburn: Meoto zenzai), also known as Love Is Shared Like Sweets, is a 1955 Japanese drama film directed by Shirō Toyoda, starring Hisaya Morishige and Chikage Awashima. It is an adaptation of the 1940 novel of the same name by Sakunosuke Oda.

Marital Relations tells the story of a couple, a disinherited son of a shopkeeper and his geisha mistress, in Osaka in the early Shōwa era.

== Cast ==
- Hisaya Morishige
- Chikage Awashima
- Yoko Tsukasa
- Chieko Naniwa
- Haruo Tanaka

== Awards ==
Marital Relations received the Blue Ribbon Awards for Best Director, Best Actor (Morishige) and Best Actress (Awashima), and the Mainichi Film Concours for Best Actor and Best Screenplay (Yasumi Toshio). It ranked second (after Mikio Naruse's Floating Clouds) on the list of the year's ten best films of Kinema Junpō.
