= The Twilight Story =

1960 film by Shirō Toyoda

- Theatrical release poster
- Bokuto kitan
- Directed by: Shirō Toyoda
- Screenplay by: Toshio Yasumi
- Based on: A Strange Tale from East of the River; by Kafū Nagai
- Produced by: Ichiro Sato
- Starring: Fujiko Yamamoto; Hiroshi Akutagawa; Masao Oda; Michiyo Aratama
- Cinematography: Masao Tamai
- Edited by: Koichi Iwashita
- Music by: Dan Ikuma
- Production company: Tokyo Eiga
- Distributed by: Toho
- Release dates: 28 August 1960 (Japan); April 1962 (US)
- Running time: 119 minutes
- Country: Japan
- Language: Japanese

The Twilight Story (Japanese: 濹東綺譚 / 〓東綺譚 (Note: The writing of the original title varies depending on the source, e.g. Kotobank lists the film as 濹東綺譚, the Japanese Movie Database as 〓東綺譚.), Hepburn: Bokuto kitan), also titled Twilight Story, is a 1960 Japanese drama film directed by Shirō Toyoda. It is based on Kafū Nagai's 1937 short story A Strange Tale from East of the River.

== Plot ==
In the Tamanoi (now Higashi-Mukōjima, Sumida) district of 1936 Tokyo, geisha Oyuki earns her money as a prostitute to support her sick mother. One day, Oyuki meets and falls in love with a new customer, English teacher Junpei, who pretends that he lives alone while in reality he has a wife, Mitsuko. He and Mitsuko have ongoing arguments about his low salary and his discontent to accept financial support from the father of Mitsuko's child which she brought into the marriage. Meanwhile, Oyuki's uncle Otokichi, who acts as a messenger, spends the money intended for her mother on a prostitute himself, resulting in the mother's death. Junpei eventually returns to Mitsuko, though reluctantly, while the disillusioned Oyuki is hospitalised with blood poisoning. In the final scene, the narrator, an elderly writer and regular visitor to Tamanoi, reflects on the district's decline with the Pacific War entering its last stage.

== Cast ==
- Fujiko Yamamoto as Oyuki
- Hiroshi Akutagawa as Junpei Taneda
- Masao Oda as Uncle Otokichi
- Michiyo Aratama as Mitsuko Taneda
- Nobuo Nakamura as Sanji
- Eijirō Tōno as Yamai
- Nobuko Otowa as Kyoko Yamai
- Keiko Awaji as Ofusa
- Seiji Miyaguchi as Yoshizo
- Kyōko Kishida as Teruko
- Natsuko Kahara as Yoshizo's wife Otane
- Sumiko Hidaka as Tamae
- Chisako Hara as Otoki
- Shikaku Nakamura as the writer

== Production ==
In addition to Kafū Nagai's short story A Strange Tale from East of the River, which it is officially based on, The Twilight Story also incorporates Nagai's short story Shissou and his diary Danchōtei nichijō.

== Reception ==
In their compendium The Japanese Film – Art and Industry, film historians Donald Richie and Joseph L. Anderson called The Twilight Story an "outstanding adaptation" of Nagai's story.

== Awards ==
- Kinema Junpo Award for Best Actress Fujiko Yamamoto (for The Twilight Story and A Woman's Testament)
- Blue Ribbon Award for Best Supporting Actor Masao Oda (for The Twilight Story and The River Fuefuki)

== Legacy ==
The Twilight Story was screened at the Berkeley Art Museum and Pacific Film Archive in 1994.

Kafu's story was again adapted in 1992 by director Kaneto Shindō, titled The Strange Story of Oyuki.
