= A Cat, Shozo, and Two Women =

1956 film by Shirō Toyoda

- Film poster
- Directed by: Shirō Toyoda
- Screenplay by: Toshio Yasumi
- Based on: A Cat, a Man, and Two Women; Jun'ichirō Tanizaki
- Produced by: Kazuo Takimura; Ichiro Sato
- Starring: Hisaya Morishige; Isuzu Yamada; Kyoko Kagawa; Chieko Naniwa
- Cinematography: Mitsuo Miura
- Music by: Yasushi Akutagawa
- Production company: Tokyo Eiga
- Distributed by: Toho
- Release dates: 9 October 1956 (Japan); November 1988 (US)
- Running time: 135 minutes
- Country: Japan
- Language: Japanese

A Cat, Shozo, and Two Women (Japanese: 猫と庄造と二人のをんな, Hepburn: Neko to Shōzō to futari no onna), also titled Shozo, a Cat, and Two Women, is a 1956 Japanese comedy film directed by Shirō Toyoda. It is based on Jun'ichirō Tanizaki's 1936 novella A Cat, a Man, and Two Women.

== Plot ==
Kitchenware salesman Shōzō shows more affection for his cat Lily than for the people around him. When his disgruntled wife Shinako moves out, his mother Orin, who never got along with her daughter-in-law, encourages him to marry Fukuko, the young daughter of Shōzō's wealthy uncle Nakajima. Fukuko is soon enervated by her future husband's obsessive love for his cat. Shinako, who moved in with her sister, talks Fukuko into giving Lily to her, speculating that the couple will fall out with each other over the cat's absence, and that Shōzō will eventually take Shinako back. Although Shōzō and Fukuko do separate after repeated quarrels, he refuses to re-unite with Shinako. Lily escapes from Shinako's flat, and while Shōzō searches for her, Fukuko and Shinako get engaged in a fight. Thrown out of his home by Fukuko, whose father paid the mortgage for the house, he walks along the rainy beach, his cat in his arms.

== Cast ==
- Hisaya Morishige as Shōzō
- Isuzu Yamada as Shinako
- Kyōko Kagawa as Fukuko
- Chieko Naniwa as Orin, Shōzō's mother
- Juro Hayashida as Nakajima
- Ashinoya Gangyoku as Kinoshita
- Kyū Sazanka as Soeyama
- Haruo Tanaka as Hagimura
- Michiyo Tamaki as Tamiko
- Yuko Minami as Hatsuko, Shinako's sister
- Katsue Miyakoya as Matsu

== Reception ==
In his 1959 compendium The Japanese Film – Art and Industry, film historian Donald Richie called A Cat, Shozo, and Two Women "warm, moving, and awfully funny, a winning combination of comedy and impeccable taste".

== Awards ==
Isuzu Yamada received the Kinema Junpo Award for Best Actress, the Mainichi Film Award for Best Actress and the Blue Ribbon Award for Best Actress. Mitsuo Miura was awarded the Mainichi Film Award for Best Cinematography and the Blue Ribbon Award for Best Cinematography.
