= Mōjū Tsukai no Shōjo =

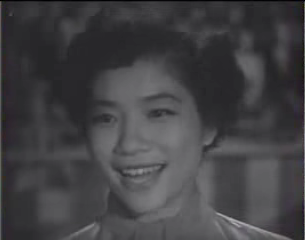
- Chiemi Eri had the leading role in the film.
- Directed by: Kozo Saeki
- Written by: Toshirō Ide; Umetsugu Inoue
- Starring: Chiemi Eri; Jun Negami; Kazuko Fushimi
- Cinematography: Tomohiro Akino
- Music by: Urato Watanabe
- Production company: Daiei Film
- Release date: June 5, 1952 (Japan)
- Running time: 95 minutes
- Country: Japan
- Language: Japanese

Mōjū Tsukai no Shōjo (Japanese: 猛獣使いの少女, Hepburn: lit. The Beast Taming Girl) is a 1952 black-and-white Japanese film directed by Kozo Saeki.

== Overview ==
Chiemi Eri sings in the film.

== Cast ==
- Chiemi Eri
- Jun Negami
- Kazuko Fushimi
- Jōji Oka
- Minoru Chiaki
- Ayako Wakao

== See also ==
- List of films in the public domain in the United States
