= So Young, So Bright =

So Young, So Bright Janken musume
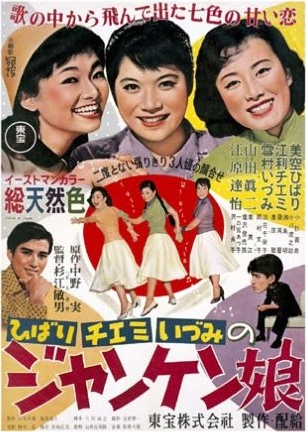
- Japanese film poster
- Directed by: Toshio Sugie
- Screenplay by: Naoyuki Hatta
- Story by: Minoru Nakano
- Produced by: Sadao Sugihara; Tsujin Fukushima
- Starring: Hibari Misora; Chiemi Eri; Izumi Yukimura; Chieko Naniwa; Minoru Takada
- Cinematography: Taiichi Kankura
- Edited by: Koichi Iwashita
- Music by: Hachiro Matsui
- Distributed by: Toho
- Release dates: November 1, 1955 (Japan); March 1963 (United States)
- Running time: 92 minutes
- Country: Japan
- Language: Japanese

So Young, So Bright (Japanese: ジャンケン娘, Hepburn: Janken musume) (literally, "Rock, Paper and Scissors Girls") is a 1955 color (Eastmancolor) Japanese musical film, directed by Toshio Sugie. This is the first of the so-called "three girl" (sannin musume) series of films produced by Tōhō Studio, which involved teaming three popular young female stars of the period, employing a plot that portrayed their characters as best friends and recounted their romances and other adventures. This film was Toho's highest-grossing film of 1955.

Production design was made by Shinobu Muraki and the sound recordist was Masanobu Miyazaki.

== Plot ==
Two high school girls, Ruri and Yumi, head to Kyoto on a school field trip. The two try to take a picture on the Kamo River, but they fall into the river and dry their clothes on the riverbank. There, they meets a young man and they photographed it. After that, they head to Gion, where Oshin's teahouse, which is a friend of Ruri's mother's faith, is located, and are introduced to Hinagiku and the three become friends. Hinagiku wants to meet a young male student named Saitō Matabei, who he met twice in a tatami room in Kyoto before welcoming a man she doesn't like as his husband. It turned out that they were in Izu after they searched together. The three of them try to go to Izu, but Ruri gives up because of the opposition from his faith.

Oshin was thinking of meeting Ruri's father, Kitajima, at Ruri's Japanese traditional dance recital. Due to the opposition of the surroundings, Oshin, who was a geisha, and Kitajima, a diplomat, were separated, but Kitajima offered to meet Ruri before he was appointed as the French ambassador. Yumi and Hinagiku, who came to Izu with Ruri, met Saitō Matabei, but Saito was the same person as the young man who once photographed by Ruri and Yumi.

After learning that Saito had already applied for marriage to Yumi's parents, Hinagiku returns to Kyoto with heartbreak. On the other hand, Saito, who learned about the circumstances of Hinagiku, consulted with his father, a businessman, and got money to help him free. And on the day of the concert, Mr. and Mrs. Kitajima, Yumi, Saito, and Hinagiku who have recovered from their heartbreak will also come to the venue. After finishing the dance, Ruri calls Kitajima his father for the first time and reunites without being particular about the history of their past.

Japanese movie poster

== Cast ==
- Hibari Misora as Ruri Asami
- Chiemi Eri as Yumi Chigira
- Izumi Yukimura as Hinagiku
- Chieko Naniwa as Oshin
- Minoru Takada as Kitajima
- Atsuko Ichinomiya as Mrs. Kitajima
- Tatsuyoshi Ehara as Seiji Mori
- Shinji Yamada as Saitō Matabei
- Yoshio Kosugi as Komei (Yumi's father)
- Yoshie Minami as Kinko (Yumi's mother)
- Fumiko Okamura as Ms. Kamezawa
- Akira Sera as Professor Kuwahara
- Toranosuke Ogawa as Shigebei Saito
- Shin Tatsuoka as Sumura
- Kazuo Fukuda as Sakai
- Toki Shiozawa as Dance instructor
- Sadako Sawamura as Oine
