= The End of Summer =

- Theatrical release poster
- Directed by: Yasujirō Ozu
- Written by: Kōgo Noda; Yasujirō Ozu
- Produced by: Sanezumi Fujimoto; Masakatsu Kaneko; Tadahiro Teramoto
- Starring: Nakamura Ganjirō II; Setsuko Hara; Yoko Tsukasa
- Cinematography: Asakazu Nakai
- Edited by: Koichi Iwashita
- Music by: Toshiro Mayuzumi
- Distributed by: Toho
- Release date: 29 October 1961
- Running time: 103 minutes
- Country: Japan
- Languages: Japanese, English

The End of Summer (小早川家の秋, Kohayagawa-ke no aki; lit. "Autumn of the Kohayagawa family") is a 1961 Japanese film directed by Yasujirō Ozu for Toho Films. It was entered into the 12th Berlin International Film Festival. The film was his penultimate; only An Autumn Afternoon (1962) followed it, which he made for Shochiku Films.

== Plot ==
Manbei Kohayagawa (Nakamura Ganjirō II), the head of a small sake brewery outside Kyoto, has two daughters and a widowed daughter-in-law. His daughter-in-law, Akiko (Setsuko Hara), and his younger daughter, Noriko (Yoko Tsukasa), live in Osaka. Akiko helps out at an art gallery and has a son, Minoru. Noriko, unmarried, is an office worker. Manbei's other daughter, Fumiko (Michiyo Aratama), lives with him. Her husband, Hisao, helps at the brewery and they have a young son, Masao.

Manbei asks his brother-in-law Kitagawa (Daisuke Katō) to find Akiko a husband, and Kitagawa has Akiko meet a friend of his, Isomura Ei'ichiro (Hisaya Morishige), a widower, at a bar. Isomura is enthusiastic about the match, but Akiko is hesitant. Manbei also asks Kitagawa to arrange a matchmaking session for Noriko, who is in love with Teramoto (Akira Takarada), but doesn't express her love since Teramoto is moving to Sapporo to be an assistant professor.

During the summer Manbei sneaks out repeatedly to meet his former mistress, Tsune Sasaki (Chieko Naniwa). Tsune's westernized grown-up daughter Yuriko may or may not be Manbei's daughter. When Fumiko finds out that Manbei has been seeing Tsune again she confronts her father, but he denies the affair.

The Kohayagawa family meets for a memorial service for their late mother at Arashiyama. Manbei has a heart attack after quarrelling with Fumiko over Tsune, but wakes up feeling refreshed the next day. Akiko asks Noriko about another recent matchmaking session, and while Noriko admits to having had fun, she reveals that she is still pining for Teramoto.

On a secret journey to and from Osaka with Tsune, Manbei has another heart attack and dies. Tsune informs his daughters. The ailing Kohayagawa brewery is to be merged with a business rival's, while Noriko decides to go to Sapporo to seek out Teramoto. The Kohayagawa family gathers to reminisce about Manbei's life as his body is cremated.

== Cast ==
Actor	Role
Nakamura Ganjirō II	Kohayagawa Manbei
Setsuko Hara	Akiko, Manbei's widowed daughter-in-law
Yoko Tsukasa	Noriko, Manbei's youngest daughter
Michiyo Aratama	Fumiko, Manbei's oldest daughter
Keiju Kobayashi	Hisao, Fumiko's husband
Chieko Naniwa	Sasaki Tsune
Reiko Dan	Yuriko, her daughter
Haruko Sugimura	Kato Shige, Manbei's sister-in-law from Nagoya
Hisaya Morishige	Isomura Eiichiro, Akiko's suitor
Daisuke Katō	Kitagawa Yanosuke, "the uncle from Osaka," Manbei's brother-in-law
Akira Takarada	Teramoto Tadashi
Kyū Sazanka	Yamaguchi, Chief clerk
Yū Fujiki	Maruyama Rokutaro, Assistant clerk
Haruko Togo	Kitagawa Teruko, Yanosuke's wife
Michiyo Tamaki	Hostess
Yumi Shirakawa	Nakanishi Takako, Noriko's friend
Tatsuo Endō	Hayashi Seizo
Masahiko Shimazu	Masao, Hisao and Fumiko's son
Chishū Ryū	Farmer
Yūko Mochizuki	Farmer

== Production ==
In order to secure its contract stars Setsuko Hara and Yoko Tsukasa from Toho for his previous film, Late Autumn, Ozu agreed to direct The End of Summer for the studio, making it his only Toho film and one of his three films not produced for Shochiku (the others are Floating Weeds for Daiei and The Munekata Sisters for Shintoho). As a result, the film is filled with Toho players, many of whom took the opportunity to appear in their only Ozu film, including marquee headliners Hisaya Morishige and Akira Takarada taking small roles. Ozu added a scene at the end to accommodate Toho's star Yūko Mochizuki, who asked to be in the film, as well as his signature actor Chishū Ryū. The film is also notable as the only known extant Ozu film to contain foreign actors, with two uncredited men playing the bit parts of Yuriko's interchangeable American boyfriends, George and Harry.

== Reception ==
Dennis Schwartz praised The End of Summer as a "deft blending of comedy and tragedy", writing that Manbei's "lively antics give the film a wonderfully playful tone."

The French film-maker Eugène Green, who gave the film one of his ten votes in the 2012 Sight & Sound directors' poll of the world's best films, wrote that it "stands out as a meditation on death, with certain shots of an extraordinary power and beauty. The scenes between the two sisters are deeply moving."

Another director, Ashim Ahluwalia, mentioned the film as one of his top ten of all time, writing that "End of Summer is a poignant, near-perfect film about endings, made a year before Ozu died."

Leonard Maltin gave it three of four stars: "Astute, deliberately paced slice of life about a Japanese family whose relationships reflect changing times in the "new" Japan."

On review aggregator website Rotten Tomatoes, the film holds an approval rating of 100% based on 9 reviews.

== Home media ==
In 2007, The Criterion Collection released the film as part of the DVD box set Eclipse Series 3: Late Ozu.
