= Shinobu Muraki =

Japanese production designer and art director (1923–1997)

- Born: September 2, 1923; Tokyo, Japan
- Died: January 16, 1997 (aged 73)
- Spouse: Yoshirō Muraki (?-?)

Shinobu Muraki (村木 忍, Muraki Shinobu; September 2, 1923 – January 16, 1997) was a Japanese production designer and art director. She was nominated for the Academy Award for Best Art Direction in 1986 for her work in Akira Kurosawa's film Ran (1985). She was married to Yoshirō Muraki.

== Filmography (as production designer) ==
- So Young, So Bright (ジャンケン娘 Janken musume) (1955)
- Romantic Daughters (ロマンス娘 Romansu musume) (1956)
- Long Journey into Love (1973)
