= Romantic Daughters =

Romantic Daughters Romansu musume
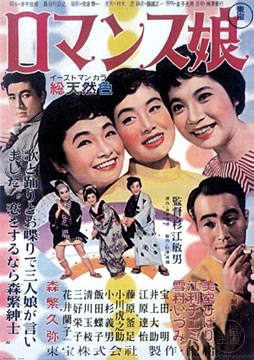
- Original Japanese film poster
- Directed by: Toshio Sugie
- Screenplay by: Kimiyuki Hasegawa; Toshirō Ide
- Story by: Toshirō Ide
- Produced by: Sadao Sugihara
- Starring: Hibari Misora; Chiemi Eri; Izumi Yukimura
- Cinematography: Taiichi Kankura
- Music by: Yoshiyuki Kozu
- Production company: Toho
- Distributed by: Toho
- Release date: August 11, 1956 (Japan)
- Running time: 98 minutes
- Country: Japan
- Language: Japanese

Romantic Daughters (Japanese: ロマンス娘, Hepburn: Romansu musume) is a 1956 color Japanese film directed by Toshio Sugie. It is a romantic comedy film.

Production designer was Shinobu Muraki, sound recordist was Shoichi Fujinawa and lighting technician was Mitsuo Kaneko.

== Cast ==
| Actor | Role |
|---|---|
| Hibari Misora | Rumiko |
| Chiemi Eri | Eriko |
| Izumi Yukimura | Michiru |
| Kamatari Fujiwara | Hozo, Rumiko's father |
| Tamae Kiyokawa | Shino, Rumiko's mother |
| Yoshio Kosugi | Seiji, Eriko's father |
| Terujo Mita | Kayo, Eriko's mother |
| Ranko Hanai | Taeko, Michiru's mother |
| Akira Takarada | Kubota |
| Hisaya Morishige | Morishige |
| Toranosuke Ogawa | Chairman Kawamura |
| Eiko Miyoshi | Auntie |
| Tatsuyoshi Ehara | Nakahara |
| Daisuke Inoue | Yamazaki |
| Natsuko Matsuyama | Yukiko |
| Choko Iida | Old woman in a department store |
| Fuyuki Murakami | Department manager |
| Akira Sera | Department manager |
| Kyoro Sakurai | Newspaper reporter |
| Toki Shiozawa (Toki Shiozawa) | Woman shopping |
| Kumeko Otowa | Woman bringing in a marriage |
| Toyohiko Sata | Middle-aged man at Takarazuka Theater |
