= Shiretoko Love Song =

Shiretoko Peninsula (red circle) in Hokkaido, Japan

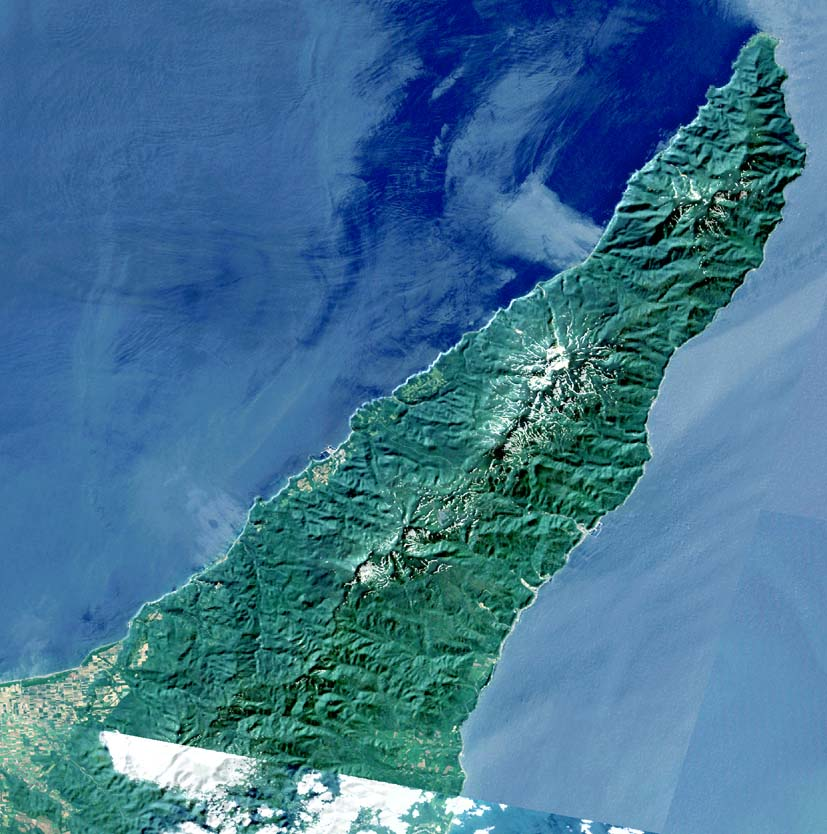
Shiretoko Peninsula, a Landsat space photo

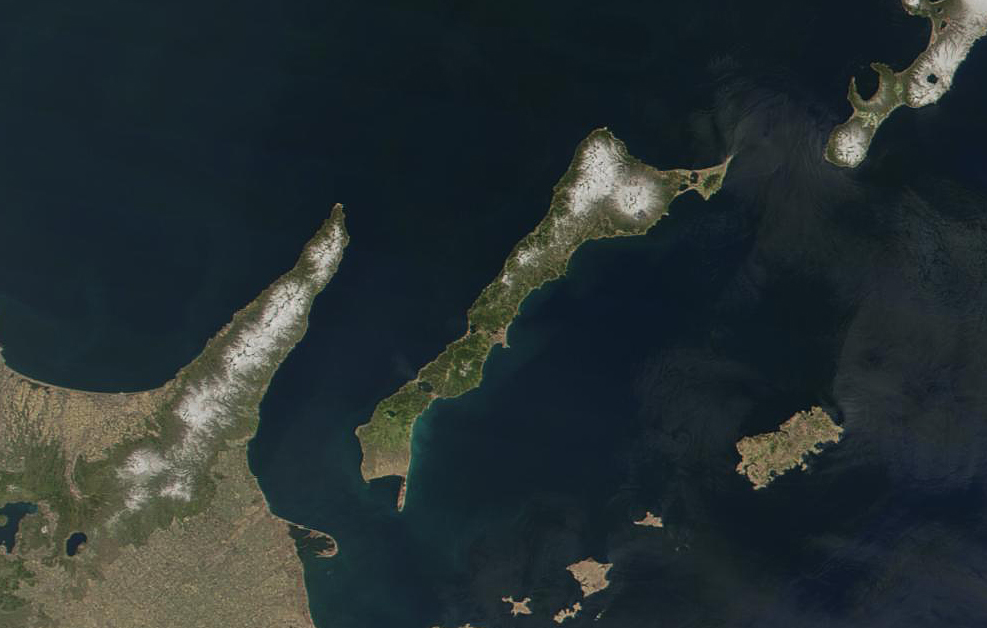
Kunashiri Island, located immediately east (right) of the Shiretoko Peninsula, is shown with the other islands, now occupied by Russia.

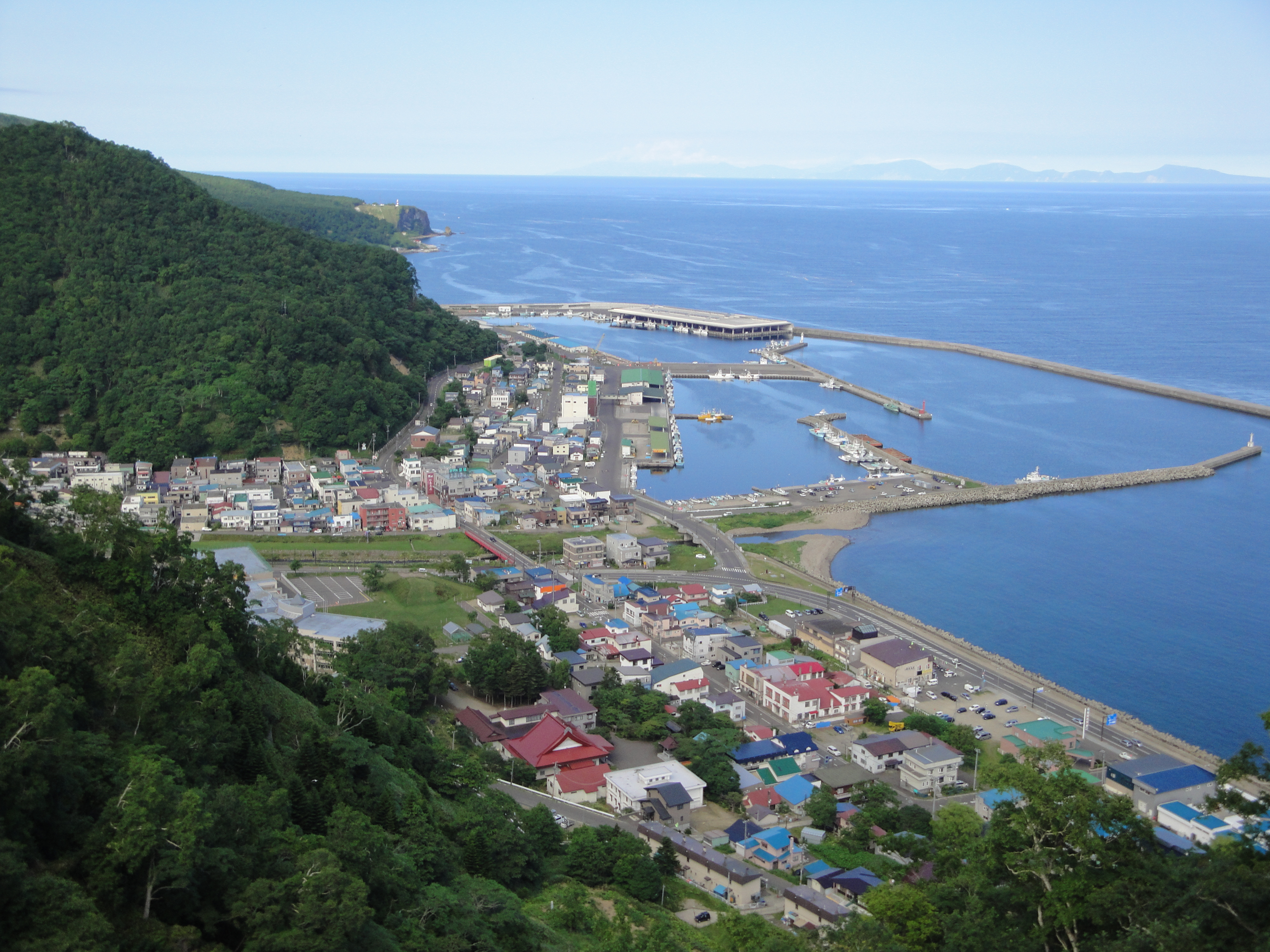
Looking down upon Rausu Town, Hokkaido, from the "nearby hill" in the song

Shiretoko Love Song (Japanese: 知床旅情=Shiretoko Ryojō) is a love song whose words and music were made by Hisaya Morishige, related to the Shiretoko Peninsula of Hokkaido, Japan.

== In general ==
To shoot a film, Hisaya Morishige (1913–2009), a Japanese actor and comedian, stayed in Rausu Town in the Shiretoko Peninsula and wrote this song in 1960. It was first sung by Morishige himself before the town people of Rausu on his last day there.

The words of the song were later changed with its new title, "Okhotsk Boat Song". It was for the fishermen who could not return to Kunashiri Island because the Soviet Union moved and occupied this and other Kuril Islands in the Okhotsk Sea, two weeks after Japan's surrender of August 15, 1945. It was sung by Morishige himself and Chieko Baisho.

The lyrics of the song were further changed with its newer title, "Shiretoko Love Song". This version sung by Tokiko Kato became extremely popular, and single record was a million seller in Japan. She won the singer award of the 13th Japan Record Awards of 1971.

Shiretoko still continues to be one of the songs most often sung in Japan's karaoke now.

== Lyrics ==
The current version of the song is composed of three stanzas. The first stanza can be translated as:

At Cape Shiretoko
Where hamanasu roses bloomed by the sea,
Please remember, dear,
That we loved each other.
We drank together, made merry,
And, as we climbed the nearby hill,
Saw the day break
Over the island of Kunashiri.

The second stanza, starting with "Tabi no nasake ni", translates:

On this trip so far away from home,
I drank too much till I swayed.
As we together went out to the seashore,
The moon was shining over the sea waves.
Since tonight was the time to embrace you,
We hid ourselves behind the rocks,
While pirika puffins serenaded around us.

The third stanza, starting with "Wakare no hi wa kita", can be translated:

The day of our parting has come
To the town of Ra-u-su.
We are going away
Over the mountain pass.
I would hate to forget you,
I, a frivolous crow.
Pray, don't let me cry,
You, a white seagull.

== See also ==
- Kuril Islands dispute
