= The Mysterians =

1957 film by Ishirō Honda

- Theatrical release poster

Japanese name
- Kanji: 地球防衛軍
Transcriptions
- Revised Hepburn: Chikyū Bōeigun
- Directed by: Ishirō Honda
- Screenplay by: Takeshi Kimura
- Story by: Jōjirō Okami
- Based on: An adaptation by Shigeru Kayama
- Produced by: Tomoyuki Tanaka
- Starring: Kenji Sahara; Yumi Shirakawa; Momoko Kōchi; Akihiko Hirata; Yoshio Tsuchiya; Susumu Fujita; Takashi Shimura
- Cinematography: Hajime Koizumi
- Edited by: Hiroichi Iwashita
- Music by: Akira Ifukube
- Production company: Toho
- Distributed by: Toho
- Release date: December 28, 1957 (Japan)
- Running time: 89 minutes
- Country: Japan
- Languages: Japanese; English
- Budget: ¥200 million
- Box office: ¥193 million (Japan) $975,000 (U.S.)

The Mysterians (Japanese: 地球防衛軍, Hepburn: Chikyū Bōeigun; lit. 'Earth Defense Force') is a 1957 Japanese epic science fiction film directed by Ishirō Honda, with special effects by Eiji Tsuburaya. Produced and distributed by Toho Co., Ltd., it is the first Honda-Tsuburaya collaboration filmed in both color and TohoScope, and stars Kenji Sahara, Yumi Shirakawa, Momoko Kōchi, Akihiko Hirata, Yoshio Tsuchiya, Susumu Fujita, and Takashi Shimura, with Haruo Nakajima and Katsumi Tezuka as Moguera. In the film, Earth's defense forces unite to combat an extraterrestrial race that desires to intermarry with human women and settle on the planet.

Inspired by the success of big-budget science fiction films in Japan and the United States, Toho executives became keen on producing a science fiction epic of their own. Producer Tomoyuki Tanaka recruited science fiction writer Jōjirō Okami to develop the story, which Shigeru Kayama later adapted for Takeshi Kimura's screenplay. Honda stated that three companies were involved in the film's production, which was the most in any tokusatsu production that he directed.

The Mysterians was released theatrically in Japan on December 28, 1957, as a double feature with Sazae's Youth. It was a box office success in Japan upon its release, earning ¥193 million against its ¥200 million budget during its original theatrical run, making it the tenth highest-grossing Japanese film of 1957, and leading Toho to produce two further space-themed science fiction epics: Battle in Outer Space (1959) and Gorath (1962). An English dub of the film was produced by RKO Radio Pictures and distributed in the United States by Metro-Goldwyn-Mayer on May 27, 1959, where it grossed $975,000 and reportedly received mostly positive reviews. Western film critics praised Tsuburaya's special effects, but some criticized the plot as confusing and juvenile.

== Plot ==
Astrophysicist Ryoichi Shiraishi, his fiancée Hiroko Iwamoto, his sister Etsuko, and his friend Joji Atsumi attend a bon festival in a village at the foot of Mount Fuji. During the festival, Shiraishi rushes out to investigate a sudden forest fire that has flared up nearby and he disappears during the confusion. The next day, Atsumi meets his mentor, Dr. Tanjiro Adachi, the head astronomer at the local observatory. Adachi hands him an incomplete report written by Shiraishi regarding a newly discovered asteroid he believed was once a planet between Mars and Jupiter, dubbed "Mysteroid". However, Adachi repudiates his radical theory.

Meanwhile, the village where the festival was held is completely wiped out by a massive earthquake. While investigating the area, Atsumi and a group of police officers stumble upon a giant robot, Moguera, which bursts from the side of a hill. It emits rays that destroy most of the investigation team; only Atsumi and the lead policeman survive. The robot then advances to a town near Koyama Bridge and met by heavy resistance from the Japan Self-Defense Forces. However, their artillery has no effect on Moguera, and the robot continues its rampage until it is destroyed by explosives detonated by the military near the Koyama Bridge.

After Atsumi briefs officials on what has been learned about the robot at the National Diet Building, astronomers witness activity in outer space around the Moon. They alert the world to this discovery; soon after, a gigantic dome emerges from the ground near Mt. Fuji. Dr. Adachi and five other scientists agree to hold a conference in the dome after a mysterious voice asks them to do so during an observation of the dome by a military and scientific entourage. The men are formally ushered into the dome, where a scientifically advanced humanoid alien race known as the "Mysterians", reveal their demands from the people of Earth: a two-mile-radius strip of land and the right to marry women of Earth. The Mysterian Leader reveals that thousands of years ago their planet—Mysteroid, once the fifth planet from the sun—was destroyed by a nuclear war. Although some Mysterians were able to escape to Mars before their planet was rendered uninhabitable, strontium-90 left the aliens' population deformed and they thus desire to interbreed with women on Earth to produce healthier offspring and keep their race alive.

Japan quickly dismisses their requests and begins the mobilization of its armed forces around Mount Fuji. Shiraishi—who vanished during the forest fire—reveals that he has sided with the Mysterians for their technological achievements. Without hesitation, Japan quickly launches a full-scale attack against the Mysterians' dome, but their modern weaponry is no match for the Mysterians' technology. This setback causes Japan to plead with other nations to join forces in eradicating the Mysterians threat. The nations around the world respond and issue another raid on the Mysterians' dome, which also fail despite deploying newly developed airships.

The Mysterians then increase their demand, asking for a 75-mile-radius of land. The humans develop a new weapon, the Markalite FAHP (Flying Atomic Heat Projector), a gigantic lens that can reflect the Mysterians' weaponry. Meanwhile, the Mysterians kidnap Etsuko and Hiroko, causing Atsumi to search for them and locate a cave entrance to a tunnel under the Mysterians' dome.

In the meantime, several Markalite FAHPs are deployed, and the final battle against the Mysterians' base of operations commences. Atsumi enters the dome and finds the women kidnapped by the Mysterians, alive and unharmed in an unguarded room. He takes them back to the tunnel, where he finds Shiraishi, who admits the Mysterians deceived him and truly have no good intentions. In a final attack on the base from the inside, Shiraishi sacrifices himself while the Markalite FAHP continue their assault. In the midst of the battle, a second Moguera deployed by the Mysterians is disabled after one of the FAHPs falls on top of it. As Adachi and the women reach safety in the hills above the Mysterians' occupied land, the dome collapses and explodes. While some of the surviving Mysterians flee into space in their spaceships, Dr. Adachi comments on the need for continued vigilance.

== Cast ==
- Kenji Sahara as Jōji Atsumi
- Yumi Shirakawa as Etsuko Shiraishi
- Momoko Kōchi as Hiroko Iwamoto
- Akihiko Hirata as Ryōichi Shiraishi
- Takashi Shimura as Dr. Kenjirō Adachi
- Susumu Fujita as General Morita
- Hisaya Itō as Captain Seki
- Yoshio Kosugi as Commander Sugimoto
- Fuyuki Murakami as Dr. Nobu Kawanami
- Tetsu Nakamura as Dr. Kōda
- Yoshio Tsuchiya as Mysterian Leader
- George Furness as Dr. Svenson
- Harold Conway as Dr. DeGracia
- Heihachiro Okawa as Director of Foreign Affairs
- Takeo Oikawa as Saburo Nozawa, TV commentator
- Toyohiko Sata as Miyamoto, police inspector
- Senkichi Omura, Shin Otomo, Haruya Kato as Villagers
- Heihachiro Okawa as the Defense Headquarters External Relations Director
- Haruo Nakajima as Moguera / JSDF officer / soldier leaping from tank / Mysterian
- Katsumi Tezuka as Moguera / villager

== Themes ==
Director Ishiro Honda described the film, saying it was "larger in scale compared to Godzilla or Rodan and is aimed to be more of a true science fiction film ... I would like to wipe away the [Cold War-era] notion of East versus West and convey a simple, universal aspiration for peace, the coming together of all humankind as one to create a peaceful society." Reflecting on the period of developing the film, Honda stated that he respected scientists, but "feared the danger of science, that whoever controlled it could take over the entire Earth."

== Production ==
=== Crew ===
- Ishirō Honda – director, co-writer
- Tomoyuki Tanaka - producer
- Eiji Tsuburaya – special effects director
- Koji Kajita – assistant director
- Yasuaki Sakamoto – production manager
- Kyuichiro Kishida – lighting
- Teruaki Abe – chief art director
- Akira Watanabe – special effects art director
- Kuichirō Kishida – special effects lighting
- Teizō Toshimitsu – monster builder
- Masanobu Miyazaki– sound recording
- Yasuyuki Inoue, Toru Narita, Yoshio Irie, Takashi Suganuma, Takeharu Ikebuchi - special effects art assistants

=== Development ===
Inspired by the success of big-budget science fiction films in Japan and the United States (such as the Byron Haskin-directed 1953 epic The War of the Worlds and Fred F. Sears' 1956 film Earth vs. the Flying Saucers), Toho executives became keen on producing a science fiction epic of their own.

=== Writing ===
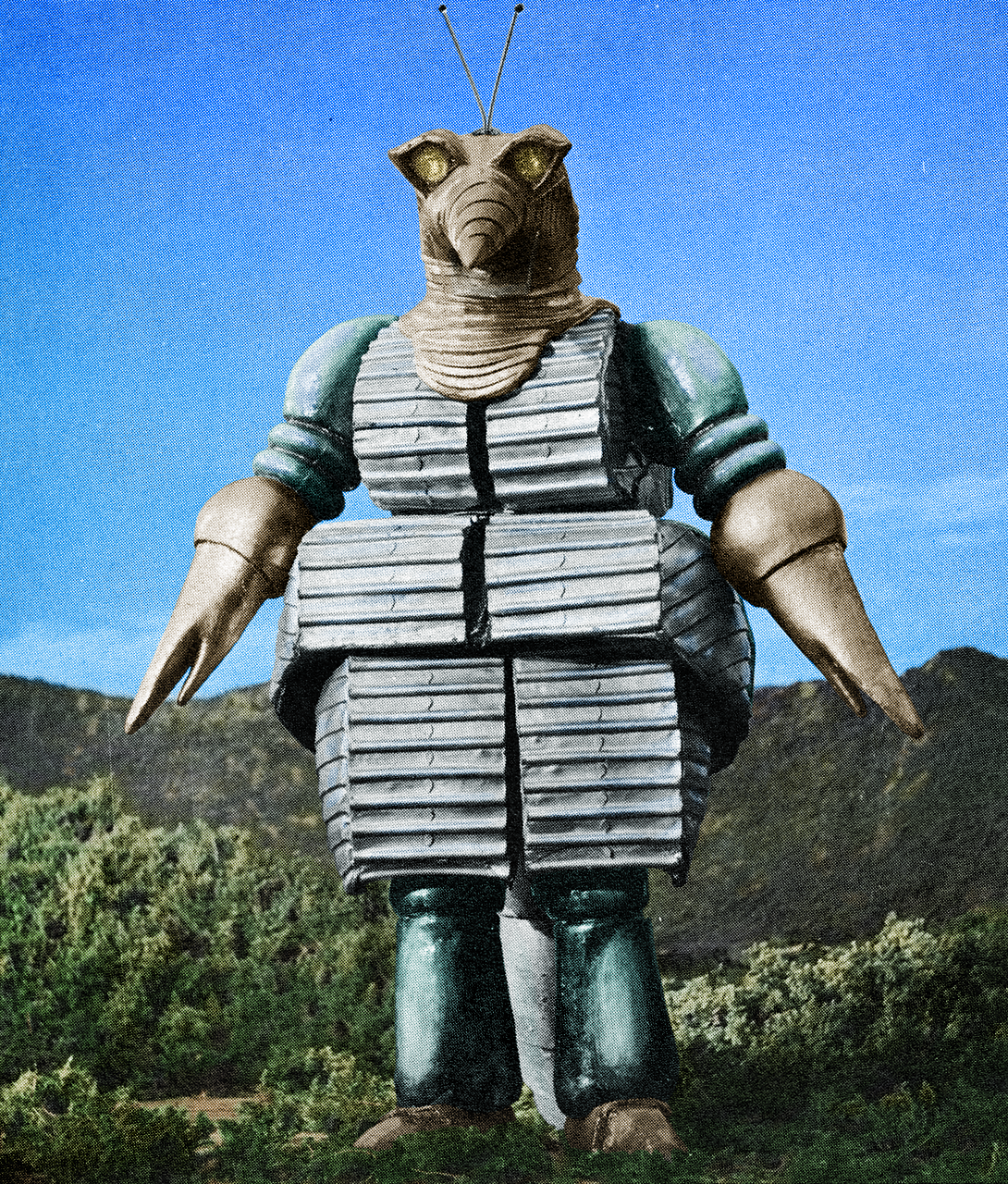
Moguera, who debuted in the film.

Producer Tomoyuki Tanaka hired sci-fi writer Jōjirō Okami to write the story after reading Okami's novel A Small Box of Lead. Even though Tanaka requested that his story be written as a novel, assuming it would later be published in a magazine, Okami's story treatment for the film was never published. Okami's treatment did not include Moguera, Shiraishi betraying humanity or the Mysterians seeking marriage with human women. Okami was reportedly told by Shigeru Kayama—who adapted it for Takeshi Kimura's screenplay—to the treatment "make it more romantic."

Tanaka liked what he saw in the story and handed it to Shigaru Kayama, who wrote the original Godzilla (1954), to further develop it. Kayama's idea for the Mysterians wanting to mate with earth women to repopulate their dying race was his idea. Tanaka insisted that a monster be included, which was at first a flesh and blood alien monster, an underground reptile creature similar to Baragon. Ishiro Honda, wanting to demonstrate the technological superiority the Mysterians possessed, became the giant burrowing, robot monster Moguera instead. There were other differences in early drafts too, instead of emerging from the ground, the Mysterian Dome was supposed to emerge from a lake. Also, the Mysterians were to have an invisible laser that would shoot down planes when they flew too close to their territory at Mt. Fuji. Earlier drafts also portrayed the decision to form the multinational Earth Defense Force as being more controversial in the eyes of the public.

Takeshi Kimura later turned in four versions of the script in total. It's unknown whose idea this was, it's interesting that even though the film is about an alien storyline, a strong anti-nuclear theme was still injected into the film.

=== Casting ===
Seven Samurai (1954) costar Yoshio Tsuchiya played the Mysterian Leader in the film. Tsuchiya was unconcerned by the fact that he would be covered in a helmet, glasses, and a costume made of a flameproof fiberglass-like fabric, which was visually striking but uncomfortable, as the fibers could irritate the skin. Ishiro Honda noted that the fabric was adapted from materials being developed at the time for firefighter uniforms. In an interview, Tsuchiya stated: "Toho said no [to casting me in this role], because my face would be covered. I disagreed, saying that being an actor isn't all about just showing our faces. This impressed Honda-san very much, and we formed a relationship, both at work and outside of work" According to director Ishirō Honda, "It was [Tsuchiya's] wish [to play the role], but I also knew him very well, so I thought he would be well cast". In his attempt to compensate, Tsuchiya conveyed emotion though stylized body and head movements, the aliens walk stiffly and shake their bodies when they laugh. Tsuchiya called this “space acting”, to give the alien's an “extraterrestrial” feel, setting the standard for future portrayals of aliens, like the Xiliens from Invasion of Astro-Monster (1965).

The Mysterians was Takashi Shimura's third supporting role in a Toho-produced tokusatsu film, following his role as a paleontologist in Honda's Godzilla (1954) and Motoyoshi Oda's Godzilla Raids Again (1955). Likewise, Godzilla stars Momoko Kōchi and Akihiko Hirata and Rodan (1956) stars Kenji Sahara and Yumi Shirakawa have major roles in the film as Hiroko Iwamoto, Ryōichi Shiraishi, Jōji Atsumi, and Etsuko Shiraishi respectively.

A large amount of foreign actors were cast in minor roles in the film, indicating Toho's overseas ambitions for the Honda-Tsuburaya films. Among the actors cast as United Nations scientists in the film were George Furness, a British lawyer who represented former Empire of Japan defendants at the Tokyo War Crimes Tribunal, and Harold S. Conway, a Tokyo businessman. Their interpreter was Heihachiro Okawa, an actor with a prolific eclectic career in Japan and overseas, who played a bit part in the film as the Defense Headquarters External Relations Director.

=== Filming ===
The Mysterians marks the first collaboration between Honda and special effects director Eiji Tsuburaya that was shot in anamorphic TohoScope, which the studio had just recently introduced.

Director Ishiro Honda described the film, saying it was "larger in scale compared to Godzilla or Rodan and is aimed to be a more of a true science fiction film...I would like to wipe away the [Cold War-era] notion of East versus West and convey a simple, universal aspiration for peace, the coming together of all humankind as one to create a peaceful society."

During the film, Yoshio Tsuchiya ad-libbed a line from the aliens about Earth trying to divide up the moon to sell it after the Mysterians are denied being able to take claim to a part of the Earth. While the line might seem strange, it came from personal experience. In the 1950's, Tsuchiya belonged to a group called The Space Travel Association that promoted a mission to the moon. The actor was so devoted that he convinced fellow actors Toshiro Mafune and Takashi Shimura to join. Unfortunately, he discovered that the organization was merely looking to divide up the moon for real estate, planning to use the monetary resources they were gathering for this endeavor.

Modelmaker and production designer Yasuyuki Inoue in an interview remembered the film's planning stage, “Sometimes we looked to foreign science fiction magazines, which gave us useful ideas. Sometimes we used our own imaginations.” In commenting about the detailing of the various miniatures, Inoue states, “We assumed that the machines we were building miniatures, not real machines. We wanted to make sure that we were making things that had a practical use.”

-For scenes depicting attacks by the Japan Self-Defense Forces, full cooperation was provided by the JGSDF Fuji School, allowing actual training exercises to be filmed. According to Honda, up to three companies participated, marking the largest deployment in Toho tokusatsu productions during his tenure. Many of the real weapons used in these sequences were later reused in subsequent films.

-For the filming of the Markalite GYRO rocket launch, the miniature was launched from the Mannen Bridge in Okutama.

=== Special effects ===
This film was the first tokusatsu production to employ Toho Scope in widescreen format. In the battle scenes at the base of Mount Fuji, the wide screen was fully utilized to depict the exchange of attacks. With the transition to color, lighting requirements had already increased, and further illumination was needed to accommodate the CinemaScope format. As a result, the temperature on the special effects studio sets often reached nearly 80°C (176 F). According to special effects cinematographer Motoyuki Tomioka, the increased lighting also caused a significant rise in electricity usage. This made power unavailable for other studios, so the special effects team had to begin shooting at 6:00 p.m., after other crews had completed their work for the day.

The film frequently combines live-action shots with special effects sequences through compositing and editing, achieving a seamless integration of both. Tomioka noted that the horizontal expanse of CinemaScope made it difficult to frame characters, as placing them at the center often left empty space on the sides.

The opening wildfire scene was filmed using both an open set with actors interacting with real fire, and later, studio miniatures of the same design for long shots and lava sequences. On the open set, a delayed start caused the gasoline used for ignition to vaporize and spread, resulting in the fire covering a larger area than planned. Consequently, the actors' reactions of fear were genuine. Honda later recalled that at the time, open sets allowed for the use of large amounts of gasoline.

In previous films, Tsuburaya's miniature tanks had been pulled along by wires. For this film, it was decided to move them via remotely-controlled radio waves. Several tanks were prepared with receivers and the order was given to move them; unfortunately, the tanks all homed-in on the same frequency being used at a nearby army base. As a result, the tanks went every which-way. Assistant Masakatsu Asai remembered this in an interview saying, “It caused a great deal of confusion.”

Explosions from missile impacts were previously executed manually, but special effects technician Akira Suzuki devised an electrically ignited fuse system that detonated precisely when the missile hit. During preparation, however, Suzuki accidentally triggered the system, suffering burns from a napalm explosion and requiring time off.

The miniature bridge attacked by Moguera was built by Toida Manufacturing. The bridge scenes were initially filmed in an open set pool used for Godzilla (1954), but at the request of Eiji Tsuburaya, the set was reconstructed and reshot. Assistant director Inoue later expressed frustration at being ordered to rebuild the set, although the actual cause was that the original explosion footage had been ruined when film jammed in the camera.

For miniature sets, branches of Himuro cedar were used to simulate trees.

In the first battle between the Japanese military and the Mysterians, many tanks and cannons were melted by the Mysterians heat rays, the effect was done using models made from wax and filmed in fast motion to simulate melting.

During the first battle between the military and the Mysterians, there is a shot of a jet dive-bombing the Dome. To achieve this, special effects photographer Sadamasa Arikawa recalled in an interview, “A crane is only good for long-distance, so we tried ropes around an over-hanging rail. Suspended below it were two wooden boards. Stretched out on the boards was a cameraman and the camera, which ran on batteries. Crewmembers grabbed onto the ropes and pulled the boards along! You know, since a camera cannot fly, it was the only way we could have produced such an image.”

When a tank is caught in a trap set by the Mysterians, a soldier attempts to extricate himself from his tank. As the miniature tank spun about, a detailed doll of the soldier was pulled by a slender thread of nylon pulled the doll out of the tank. Wire operator Fumio Nakashiro noted that one doll accidentally “jumped” due to mistimed operation, which ultimately worked well on screen. Yoshio Irie speculated that the full-scale models were the same ones used in Mothra (1961).

During the flooding scene, a huge wave is covering a live-action shot of a bridge with people running on it. The waters rush is interrupted by the structure. This was achieved by building a miniature model of the bridge, painting it blue, lined it up in frame to match the full-size bridge, and then water was poured over it. When the composited water was layered over the real bridge, they lined up perfectly.

== Release ==
The Mysterians was released in Japan by Toho on December 28, 1957. The film earned ¥193 million during its theatrical run, making it Toho's second highest-grossing film of the year, only behind Hiroshi Inagaki's Rickshaw Man, and was the tenth highest-grossing film in Japan overall. The film was reissued theatrically in Japan on March 18, 1978.

In the United States, The Mysterians was originally purchased by RKO Radio Pictures, which provided the dubbing, but was sold to Loew's Inc. for release due to RKO's failing fortunes. The film was first released in the US by Metro Goldwyn Mayer in 50 Los Angeles theaters on May 27, 1959, the first half of a double bill with First Man Into Space, the publicity campaign being supervised by Terry Turner. It grossed $975,000 at the American box office but only made MGM a profit of $58,000.

=== Home media ===
In 2005, The Mysterians was released on Region 1 DVD by Media Blasters under their Tokyo Shock label. It contained the Japanese version with English Subtitles and a brand new unedited English Dub courtesy of Bang Zoom! Entertainment as Toho did not have the original masters for the RKO Dub. As of 2019, their DVD is out of print. In 2006, the BFI released the Japanese version of The Mysterians on DVD. The film is available on The Criterion Channel.

== Reception ==
=== Contemporaneous ===
According to Boxoffice, The Mysterians garnered generally positive reviews in the United States. Variety called it "well-produced", noting "special effects involving sliding land, quaking earth and melting mortars are realistically accomplished proving the facility with the Japanese filmmakers deal in miniatures." but found the film "As corny as it is furious" noting that "While Junior may be moved by the arrival of outer-space gremlins, big brother and all like him will laugh their heads off." The review commented on the English dub, stating that it was "understandable enough, but one might easily believe something was lost in translation." Harrison's Reports felt it was "far better than most American-made pictures of its type" and "although the story idea offers little that is novel [sic], the action holds one's interest well mainly because of the imaginative settings, the elaborate space ship used by the invaders along with its many electronic gadgets, and the very good special effects by which catastrophic scenes of destruction are depicted while the invaders and the Earthians battle each other with all sorts of weapons." Motion Picture Daily praised the film's effects, writing that "even the most jaded action fan will have to admit that some of the scenes of mass catastrophes, the seemingly endless sky and ground skirmishes and the ultra-modern 'Buck Rogers' settings have seldom, if ever, been equalled."

Some critics panned Peter Riethof and Carlos Montalban's English dub version of the film, including "H. H. T." of The New York Times and an uncredited writer for The Monthly Film Bulletin. The latter said that its "main weaknesses are a slight and confused plot, under-developed characterisation and artless acting" but praised the film's art direction and staging, calling them "possibly the most dazzling display of pyrotechnics in the genre to date."

During its theatrical run in the United States, some theatergoers accused the film of being communist propaganda.

=== Retrospective ===
In a retrospective on Soviet science fiction film, British director Alex Cox compared The Mysterians to First Spaceship on Venus but described the latter as "more complex and morally ambiguous." AllMovie praises the film for its special effects. In a retrospective review, Sight & Sound found its "space-age visuals and colourful design anticipate the spectacular fantasies Honda would go on to make for Toho in the [1960s], including Mothra, Godzilla vs. The Thing, Ghidrah The Three-Headed Monster and Invasion of the Astro-Monsters [sic]."

== Legacy ==
The Mysterians is now considered among the most renowned and spectacular Honda-Tsuburaya films and has gained a cult following from robot and science fiction film fans. Japan Society called the film one of Japan's most celebrated "sci-fi classics". The film inspired the famed garage rock band ? and the Mysterians and the 1968 made-for-television film Mars Needs Women. The film's robot kaiju Moguera would later become a recurring character in Toho's Godzilla franchise, notably appearing in the 1988 video game Godzilla: Monster of Monsters!, the 1994 film Godzilla vs. SpaceGodzilla, the television series Godzilla Island (1997–1998) as well as numerous comics.

== See also ==
- List of Japanese films of 1957
