= TohoScope =

Anamorphic motion picture format

TohoScope (東宝スコープ) is an anamorphic lens system developed in the late 1950s by Toho Studios in response to the popularity of CinemaScope. Its technical specifications are identical to those of CinemaScope. Adoption of widescreen technologies was rapid as by 1960, nearly all Japanese domestic releases were filmed in widescreen using TohoScope or one of its peer technologies. It utilized anamorphic lenses provided by the Kowa company.

This widescreen format was first used for the black-and-white films The Men of Tohoku, and On Wings of Love, made use of color in The Last Pursuit, and debuted in full-color (and tokusatsu) with The Mysterians (all 1957). The label fell out of use in 1965 to be replaced by Panavision lenses of similar specifications.

In contemporary popular culture, the recognizable Toho Scope logo prefaced Godzilla: Final Wars, one of many homages to older science fiction productions made throughout the film.
