= Ani to sono musume =

- Japanese movie poster
- Directed by: Shūe Matsubayashi
- Written by: Yasujirō Shimazu
- Production company: Toho
- Release date: September 19, 1956 (Japan)
- Country: Japan
- Language: Japanese

Ani to sono musume (Japanese: 兄とその妹), also known as Brother and Sister, is a 1956 black-and-white Japanese film drama directed by Shūe Matsubayashi.

== Cast ==
- Setsuko Hara

== See also ==
- Ani to sono imoto (1939)
