= The Badger Palace =

1958 film

- Film poster
- Directed by: Kozo Saeki
- Screenplay by: Tatsuo Nakada
- Story by: Keigo Kimura
- Produced by: Sadao Sugihara
- Starring: Hibari Misora; Izumi Yukimura; Ichirō Arishima
- Cinematography: Kōzō Okazaki
- Music by: Hachirō Matsui
- Production company: Toho
- Distributed by: Toho
- Release date: February 26, 1958 (Japan)
- Running time: 98 minutes
- Country: Japan
- Language: Japanese

The Badger Palace (Japanese: 大当り狸御殿, Hepburn: Ōatari Tanuki Goten), a.k.a. The Princess of Badger Palace, is a 1958 color (Eastmancolor) Japanese musical film directed by Kozo Saeki.

Production designer was Kazuo Okawa, sound recordist was Kanji Nakano and lighting technician was Kazuo Shimomura.

== Cast ==
- Hibari Misora - Tanukichiro
- Izumi Yukimura - Kinutahime
- Ichirō Arishima - Tanukizaemon
- Bokuzen Hidari - Awanokami
- Momoko Kōchi
- Yumi Shirakawa - Ocho
- Kenji Sahara
- Tony Tani
- Shinji Yamada
- Keiko Awaji
- Chōchō Miyako
- Daimaru Nakata
- Rocket Nakata
