= Snow Country (film) =

1957 Japanese drama film directed by Shirō Toyoda

- Original Japanese poster
- Directed by: Shirō Toyoda
- Written by: Toshio Yasumi
- Based on: Snow Country by Yasunari Kawabata
- Produced by: Ichirō Satō
- Starring: Ryō Ikebe; Keiko Kishi; Kaoru Yachigusa
- Cinematography: Jun Yasumoto
- Edited by: Kōichi Iwashita
- Music by: Ikuma Dan
- Production company: Toho
- Distributed by: Toho
- Release date: 27 April 1957 (Japan)
- Running time: 133 minutes
- Country: Japan
- Language: Japanese

Snow Country (Japanese: 雪国, Hepburn: Yukiguni) is a 1957 Japanese drama film directed by Shirō Toyoda, based on the novel of the same name by Yasunari Kawabata. The film was entered into the 1958 Cannes Film Festival.

== Cast ==
- Ryō Ikebe as Shimamura
- Keiko Kishi as Komako
- Kaoru Yachigusa as Yoko
- Daisuke Katō
- Akira Kubo
- Hisaya Morishige as Yukio
- Chieko Naniwa as Head maid
- Haruo Tanaka as Porter

== Awards ==
Screenwriter Toshio Yasumi received the Kinema Junpo Award for Best Screenplay for Snow Country and Chieko-shō.
