= An Osaka Story =

1957 Japanese film

- Film poster
- Directed by: Kōzaburō Yoshimura
- Written by: Yoshikata Yoda; Kenji Mizoguchi (story); Saikaku Ihara (story)
- Produced by: Masaichi Nagata
- Cinematography: Kohei Sugiyama
- Edited by: Shigeo Nishida
- Music by: Akira Ifukube
- Production company: Daiei Film
- Distributed by: Daiei Film
- Release date: 6 March 1957 (Japan)
- Running time: 96 minutes
- Country: Japan
- Language: Japanese

An Osaka Story (Japanese: 大阪物語, Hepburn: Osaka Monogatari) is a 1957 Japanese historical drama film directed by Kōzaburō Yoshimura. The film had originally been planned by Kenji Mizoguchi, who had adapted several stories by Saikaku Ihara into a script. After Mizoguchi's death, the project was assigned to Yoshimura.

== Cast ==
- Raizo Ichikawa as Keizaburō
- Nakamura Ganjirō II as Nihei
- Chieko Naniwa as Ofude
- Kyōko Kagawa as Onatsu
- Shintaro Katsu as Ichinosuke
- Michiko Ono as Takino
- Narutoshi Hayashi as Kichitarō
- Tamao Nakamura as Ayagi
- Eijirō Tōno as Gonzaemon Hoshino
- Kyū Sazanka as Kawachiya

== Legacy ==
An Osaka Story was screened at a 2012 retrospective on Kaneto Shindō and Kōzaburō Yoshimura in London, organised by the British Film Institute and the Japan Foundation.
