= Shūe Matsubayashi =

Japanese film director (1920–2009)

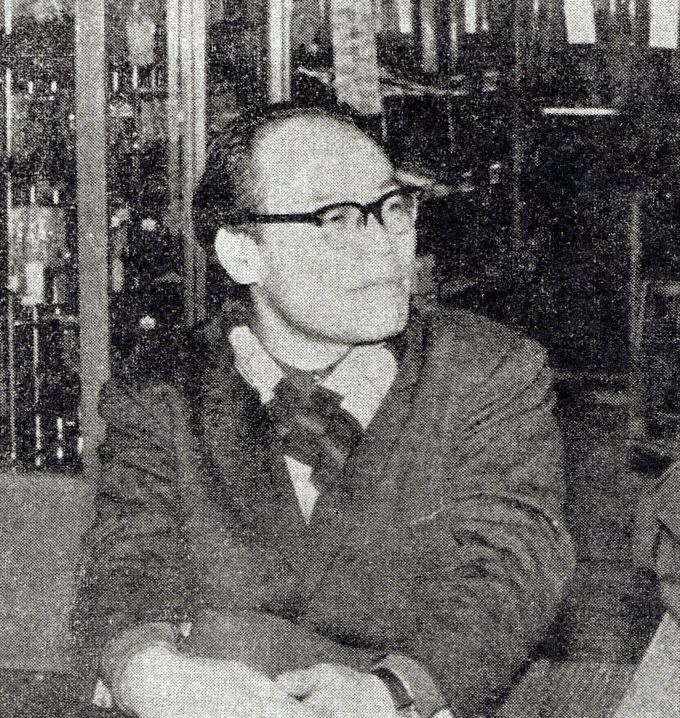
Shūe Matsubayashi

Shūe Matsubayashi (松林 宗恵, Matsubayashi Shūe; sometimes rendered as Shuei Matsubayashi) (born July 7, 1920 – August 15, 2009, in Shimane Prefecture, Japan) was a Japanese film director. He is best known for films in the comedy and war genres. He was also an ordained Shin Buddhist priest.

His final work as director was in the 1992 film Shorishatachi.

== Filmography ==
He directed over 69 movies:

- 東京のえくぼ (Tokyo no ekubo, 1952)
- ハワイの夜 (Hawai no yoru, 1953)
- 戦艦大和 (1953)
- 人間魚雷回天 (Ningen gyorai kaiten, 1955)
- 兄とその妹 (Ani to sono musume, aka Brother and Sister, 1956)
- 続青い山脈 雪子の巻 (Zoku Aoi sanmyaku Yukiko no maki, 1957)
- 美貌の都 (1957)
- ひかげの娘 (Hikage no musume, 1957)
- 社長三代記 (Shachō sandaiki, 1958)
- 続・社長三代記 (Zoku shachō sandaiki, 1958)
- 潜水艦イ-57降伏せず (Sensuikan I-57 kofuku sezu, Submarine I-57 Will Not Surrender, 1959)
- ハワイ・ミッドウェイ大海空戦 太平洋の嵐 (Hawai Middouei daikaikusen: Taiheiyo no arashi, Storm Over the Pacific, 1960)
- 社長道中記 (Shachō dochuki, 1961)
- 続・社長道中記 (Zoku shachō dochuki: onna oyabun taiketsu no maki, 1961)
- 世界大戦争 (Sekai Daisen'sō, lit. Great World War, The Last War, 1961)
- サラリーマン清水港 (Sarariman shimizu minato, 1962)
- 太平洋の翼 (Taiheiyo no tsubasa, 1963)
- てなもんや東海道 (Tenamonya Tōkaidō, 1966)
- 喜劇・百点満点 (Kigeki hyakkuten manten, 1976)
- 連合艦隊 (Imperial Navy, 1981)
- ゴルフ夜明け前 (Gorufu yoakemae, 1987)
- 勝利者たち (Shorishatachi, 1992)
