= Izumi Yukimura =

Japanese popular singer and actress (born 1937)

Yukimura Izumi 雪村 いづみ
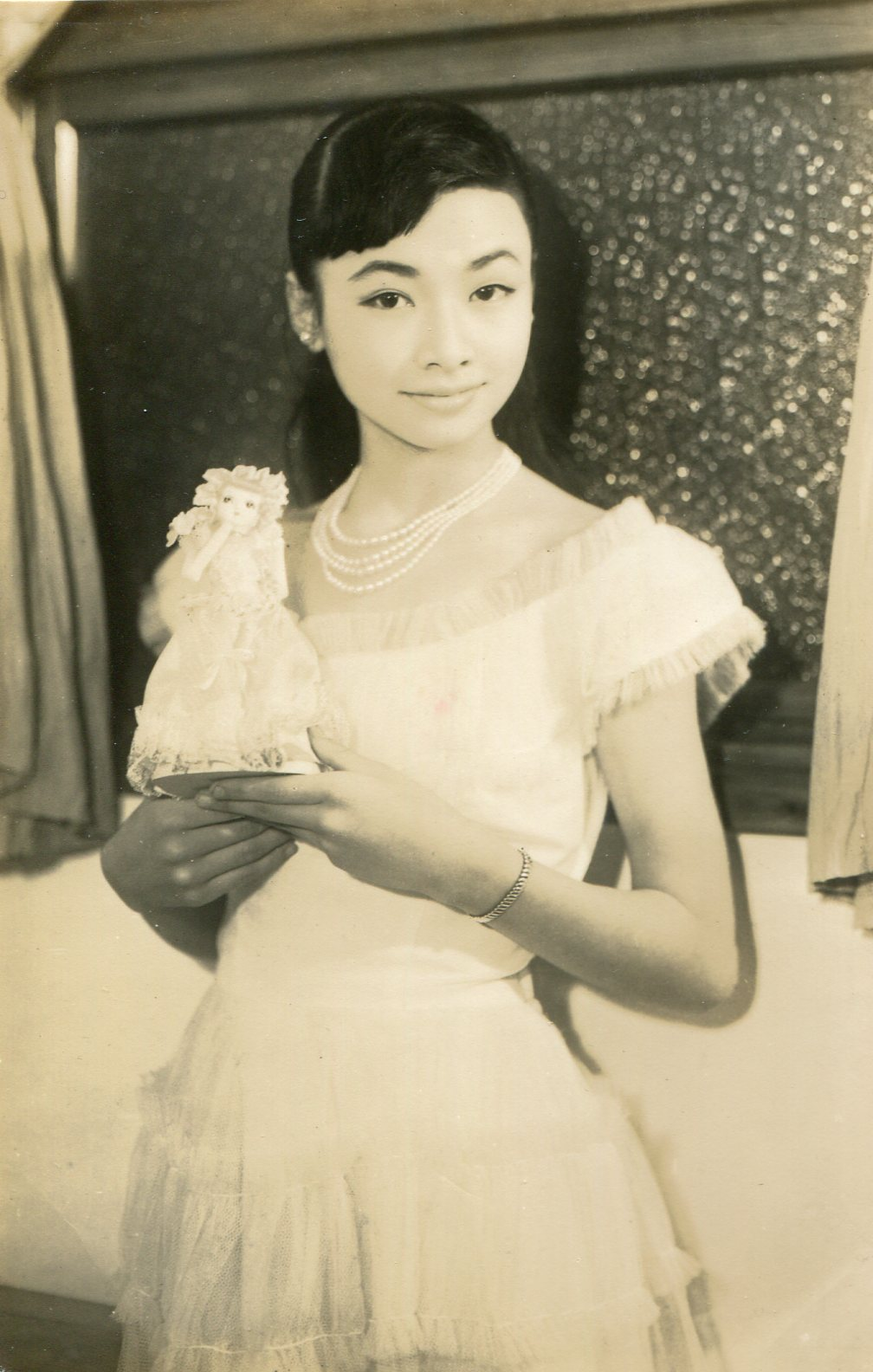
- Portrait of the singer Izumi Yukimura (1950s)

Background information
- Born: Tomoko Asahina; March 20, 1937 (age 89); Meguro, Tokyo, Japan
- Genres: Jazz, rock and roll, pop
- Occupation: Singer
- Years active: 1953–present
- Label: JVC

Izumi Yukimura (雪村 いづみ, Yukimura Izumi; born March 20, 1937) is a Japanese popular singer and actress.

Yukimura made her debut with the song "Omoide no Warutsu" (想い出のワルツ, "Till I Waltz Again with You") in 1953. Her style of singing varied from jazz to rock and roll. She became one of the three most popular female singers in the early postwar Japan, known as the “Sannin Musume (three daughters), along with Chiemi Eri and Hibari Misora.

On her 1974 album Super Generation, she sang Ryoichi Hattori's songs along with four popular musicians: Masataka Matsutoya, Shigeru Suzuki, Tatsuo Hayashi and Haruomi Hosono.

Eri, who died in 1982, and Misora, who died in 1989, also recorded songs with Yukimura as a group in the 1950s, but those recordings had not been released for about 50 years because they each belonged to separate record labels. In 2004, their album including those songs was finally released for the first time.

Her daughter is singer, actress, and painter Maria Asahina.

== Acting ==
Yukimura, Eri, and Misora starred in a trilogy of hit musical movies for Toho, one of Japan’s main movie studios. These films were Janken Musume (So Young, So Bright), 1955, Romance Musume (Romantic Daughters), 1956, and Ohatari Sanshoku Musume (On wings of Love), 1957. On Wings of Love was Toho’s top grossing film that year.

== Filmography ==
- Alice in Wonderland (1951) (theme song for the Japanese release of Disney film)
- So Young, So Bright (ジャンケン娘 Janken musume) (1955)
- Romantic Daughters (ロマンス娘, Romansu musume) (1956)
- Arashi (1956)
- On Wings of Love ( 大当り三色娘, Ōatari Sanshoku musume) (1957)
- The Badger Palace (大当り狸御殿, Ōatari tanuki goten) a.k.a. The Princess of Badger Palace (1958)
- A Holiday in Tokyo (東京の休日, Tōkyō no kyūjitsu) (1958)
- Hanayome-san wa sekai-ichi (1959)
- You Can Succeed, Too (君も出世ができる, Kimi mo shusse ga dekiru) (1964)
- The Laughing Frog (2002)
