= Young People (1937 Japanese film) =

1937 Japanese film

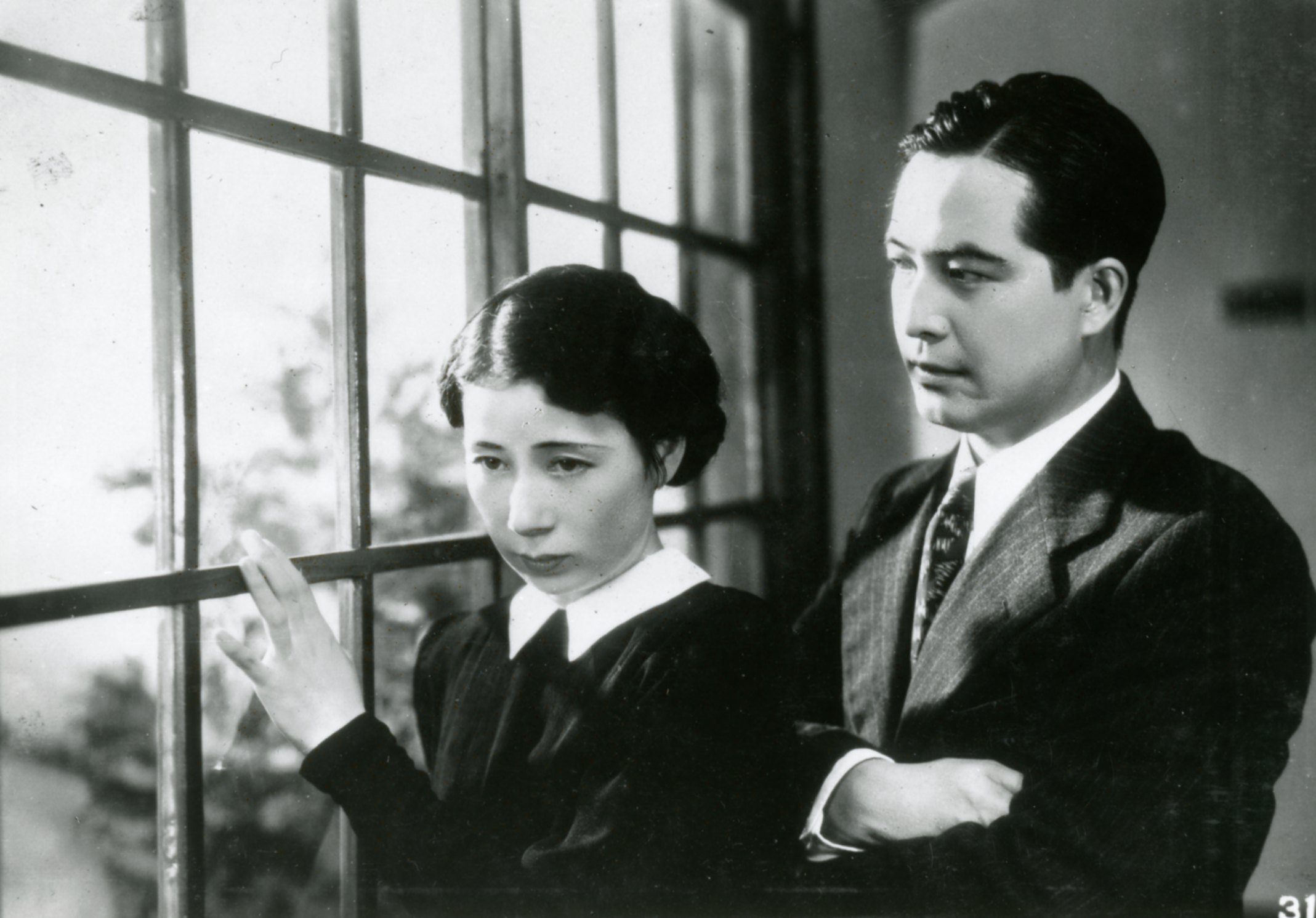
- Shizue Natsukawa and Den Obinata

Japanese name
- Kanji: 若い人
- Directed by: Shirō Toyoda
- Written by: Naoyuki Hatta; Yōjirō Ishizaka (novel)
- Starring: Shizue Natsukawa; Haruyo Ichikawa; Yuriko Hanabusa; Den Obinata
- Cinematography: Kinya Ogura
- Music by: Kohei Kubota
- Production company: Tokyo Hassei Eiga
- Distributed by: Toho
- Release date: 17 November 1937 (Japan)
- Running time: 88 minutes
- Country: Japan
- Language: Japanese

Young People (若い人, Wakai hito; lit. "Young people" or "Young person" (Note: The Japanese "hito" (人) translates both as "people" and "person".)) a.k.a. The Young is a 1937 Japanese drama film directed by Shirō Toyoda. It is based on the novel Wakai hito by Yōjirō Ishizaka, which appeared in serialised form between 1933 and 1937 in the literary journal Mita bungaku.

== Plot ==
In a Christian girls' school in northern Japan, popular young teacher Mr. Mazaki is impressed by pupil Keiko's artistic talent and unorthodox behaviour. Keiko was raised alone by her mother, bar madam Hatsu, and does not know who her father is. Mazaki's colleague Ms. Hashimoto senses the mutual affection between Mazaki and Keiko and advises him not to spend too much time on Keiko's education, which might be in vain. At the same time, Ms. Hashimoto shows an interest in Mazaki herself.

During a school excursion to Tokyo, Ms. Hashimoto's stepmother meets Mazaki and tells him that the family would like to see him as their son-in-law. Mazaki emphasises that their daughter is merely a colleague to him. Unbeknown to him and the stepmother, Keiko overhears their conversation. Upon their return from the excursion, a rumour is spreading that Keiko and Mazaki had an affair and that she is pregnant by him. Ms. Hashimoto distances herself from Mazaki until she sees a doctor's certificate which negates Keiko's alleged condition.

After a quarrel with her mother, who wants Keiko to become a bar madam like herself, Keiko shows up at Mazaki's place to take her in. Mazaki declines and asks Ms. Hashimoto to give her shelter, but Keiko refuses to follow Ms. Hashimoto, who urges Keiko to rise above herself and her upbringing. Despite her own feelings for Mazaki, Ms. Hashimoto suggests that he marries Keiko to save her. Mazaki replies that, in case he would consider this possibility, it would only be out of his responsibility as Keiko's teacher.

== Cast ==
- Shizue Natsukawa as Sumi Hashimoto
- Den Obinata as Mazaki
- Haruyo Ichikawa as Keiko Enami
- Yuriko Hanabusa as Hatsu, Keiko's mother
- Chieko Inoue as Landlady
- Chitose Hayashi as Hashimoto's stepmother
- Tomoko Itō as Ms. Yamagata
- Isamu Yamaguchi as Sasaki
- Kiyoshi Matsubayashi as Dr. Yamakawa

== Reception and legacy ==
Shirō Toyoda's film was the first of several adaptations of Yōjirō Ishizaka's novel and successful both with critics and the audience. Film historian Donald Richie rated it as one of the most important adaptations of works of the junbungaku ("pure literature") movement, which provided the source for works of directors like Toyoda, Heinosuke Gosho and Yasujirō Shimazu. In her book on literary adaptions in Japanese cinema, Keiko I. McDonald, being rather critical of Toyoda's film, pointed out that it not only left the novel's human conflicts unsolved, but also completely omitted all political implications like Hashimoto's radical left-wing leanings, possibly owed to censorship issues.

An English subtitled version was screened under the title The Young in the US in 1994.
