= Chiemi Eri =

Japanese singer and actress (1937–1982)

Eri Chiemi 江利 チエミ
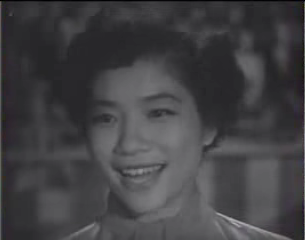
- Chiemi Eri in 1952 film Mōjū tsukai no shōjo

Background information
- Born: Kubo Chiemi; January 11, 1937; Taitō, Tokyo, Japan
- Died: February 13, 1982 (aged 45)
- Genres: Jazz, pop, kayōkyoku, enka
- Occupation: Singer
- Years active: 1952–1982
- Label: King Records

Chiemi Eri (江利 チエミ, Eri Chiemi; January 11, 1937 – February 13, 1982) was a Japanese singer and actress.

Eri was born as Chiemi Kubo (久保 智恵美, Kubo Chiemi) on January 11, 1937 in Tokyo, Japan. She was born to a musician father and a mother who was a singer, thus encouraging her musical career. She started her singing career at the age of 14 with her version of "Tennessee Waltz." She regularly sang on American military bases as a teenager. Her repertoire consisted largely of traditional Japanese songs as well as a few American songs such as "Jambalaya" and "Come on-a My House". Eri started her career as an actress similar to Hibari Misora. Eri, Misora and Izumi Yukimura formed a trio. In her concerts, she was supported by Nobuo Hara's jazz band. The actress was one of Japan's best-known singers in the mid-20th century and also appeared in numerous television shows from the early 1950s until just before her death. However, she is fairly unknown in many other parts of the world since her albums were rarely distributed in other markets, in which her music can almost only be accessed via the internet.

Eri married Ken Takakura in 1959 and they divorced in 1971. She released the single "Sakaba Nite" (酒場にて, lit. "At the Bar") in 1974. The song was later included in the omnibus album "Enka no Kokoro".

== Death ==
On the afternoon of February 13, 1982, Eri was found prone and not breathing on the bed of her Minato Ward apartment in Tokyo, by her manager. Her cause of death was listed as a stroke with asphyxiation due to vomit in the trachea. A further report indicated that while she had a cold and had already been drinking, a combination of whiskey mixed with milk, as well as cold medicine that she had heated up may have had a role in her death.

== Discography ==
Eri began her career as a singer at the age of 14 and would continue to record throughout her career. Many of her albums focused on Japanese folk music though she would often blend American standards with Latin grooves at the behest of Nobuo Hara, a prolific jazz musician and leader of Eri's backing band.

- 江利チエミ - チエミの民謡集 / Eri Chiemi - Chiemi's Folk Song Collection (1958)
- チエミスタンダードアルバム / Chiemi Sings Standards (1959)
- Chiemi Eri & The Delta Rhythm Boys (1961)
- チエミの民謡ハイライツ / Chiemi Sings Japanese Folk Songs Highlights (1962)
- チエミの民謡ハイライツ 第2集 / Chiemi Sings Japanese Folk Songs Volume 2 (1965)
- チエミの民謡デラックス / Chiemi Sings Japanese Folk Music Deluxe (1968)
- チエミの民謡デラックス第二集 / Chiemi Sings Japanese Folk Music Deluxe Volume 2 (1969)

== Filmography ==
She acted in 51 films:

=== 1950s ===
(1950s complete)

- Mōjū tsukai no shōjo (猛獣使いの少女, 1952)
- Boshi Tsuru (母子鶴, 1952)
- Shin Yajikita Dōchū (新やじきた道中, 1952)
- Seishun Jazz Musume (青春ジャズ娘, 1953)
- Yōkina Tantei (陽気な探偵, 1954)
- Hawai Chindōchū (ハワイ珍道中, 1954)
- Janken Musume (ジャンケン娘, 1955) – So Young, So Bright
- Uramachi no Otenba Musume (裏町のお転婆娘, 1956)
- Chiemi no Hatsukoi Chacha Musume (チエミの初恋チャチャ娘, 1956)
- Chiemi no Fujinkutsu (チエミの婦人靴, 1956)
- Ōabare Chacha Musume (大暴れチャチャ娘, 1956)
- Hanagasa Taiko (花笠太鼓, 1956)
- Romansu Musume (ロマンス娘, 1956) – Romantic Daughters
- Sazae-san (サザエさん, 1956)
- Kyōfu no Kūchū Satsujin (恐怖の空中殺人, 1956)
- Utau Fuyajō (歌う不夜城, 1957)
- Jazz musume tanjō (ジャズ娘誕生, 1957)
- Zoku Sazae-san (続・サザエさん, 1957)
- Ōatari sanshoku musume (大当り三色娘, 1957) – On Wings of Love
- Morishige no Boku wa Biyōshi (森繁の僕は美容師, 1957)
- Seishun Kōro (青春航路, 1957)
- Sazae-san no Seishun (サザエさんの青春, 1957)
- Romansu Matsuri (ロマンス祭, 1958)
- Sazae-san no Kon'yaku Ryokō (サザエさんの婚約旅行, 1958)
- Sazae-san no Kekkon (サザエさんの結婚, 1959)
- Sazae-san no Shinkon Katei (サザエさんの新婚家庭, 1959)
- Sazae-san no Dassen Okusama (サザエさんの脱線奥様, 1959)

=== 1960s ===
- Chiemi Eri continues to release music with King Records

=== 1970s -1980s ===
(1970s -1980s complete)

- Bakumatsu (幕末, 1970)
- Kigeki Omedetai Yatsu (喜劇 おめでたい奴, 1971)
- Chanbara Gurafitī Kiru! (ちゃんばらグラフィティー 斬る！, 1981)
- Sudachi no Toki Kyōiku wa Shinzazu (巣立ちのとき 教育は死なず, 1981)

== Other songs ==
- Blue Moon
