= Kozo Saeki =

Japanese film director (1912–1972)

- Born: 4 December 1912
- Died: 27 December 1972 (aged 60)
- Occupation: Film director
- Years active: 1941-1967

Kozo Saeki (佐伯幸三, Saeki Kōzō) (4 December 1912 – 27 December 1972) was a Japanese film director.

== Filmography ==
The filmography of Kōzō Saeki includes 110 films as director in addition to other works:

- Mōjū Tsukai no Shōjo (猛獣使いの少女) (1952)
- The Badger Palace (大当り狸御殿 Ōatari Tanuki Goten) aka The Princess of Badger Palace (1958)
- Hot Spring Ghost (1964)
- Izukoe (1966)
