= Zoku Aoi sanmyaku Yukiko no maki =

Zoku aoi sanmyaku Yukiko no maki
- Japanese movie poster
- Directed by: Shūe Matsubayashi
- Based on: A novel by Yōjirō Ishizaka
- Starring: Keiko Awaji; Takashi Shimura
- Production company: Toho
- Release date: November 19, 1957 (Japan)
- Country: Japan
- Language: Japanese

Zoku aoi sanmyaku Yukiko no maki (Japanese: 続青い山脈 雪子の巻), also known as The Blue Mountains Part 2, is a 1957 color Japanese film directed by Shūe Matsubayashi.

== Cast ==
- Keiko Awaji
- Takashi Shimura
