= Yoshio Kosugi =

Japanese actor (1903–1968)

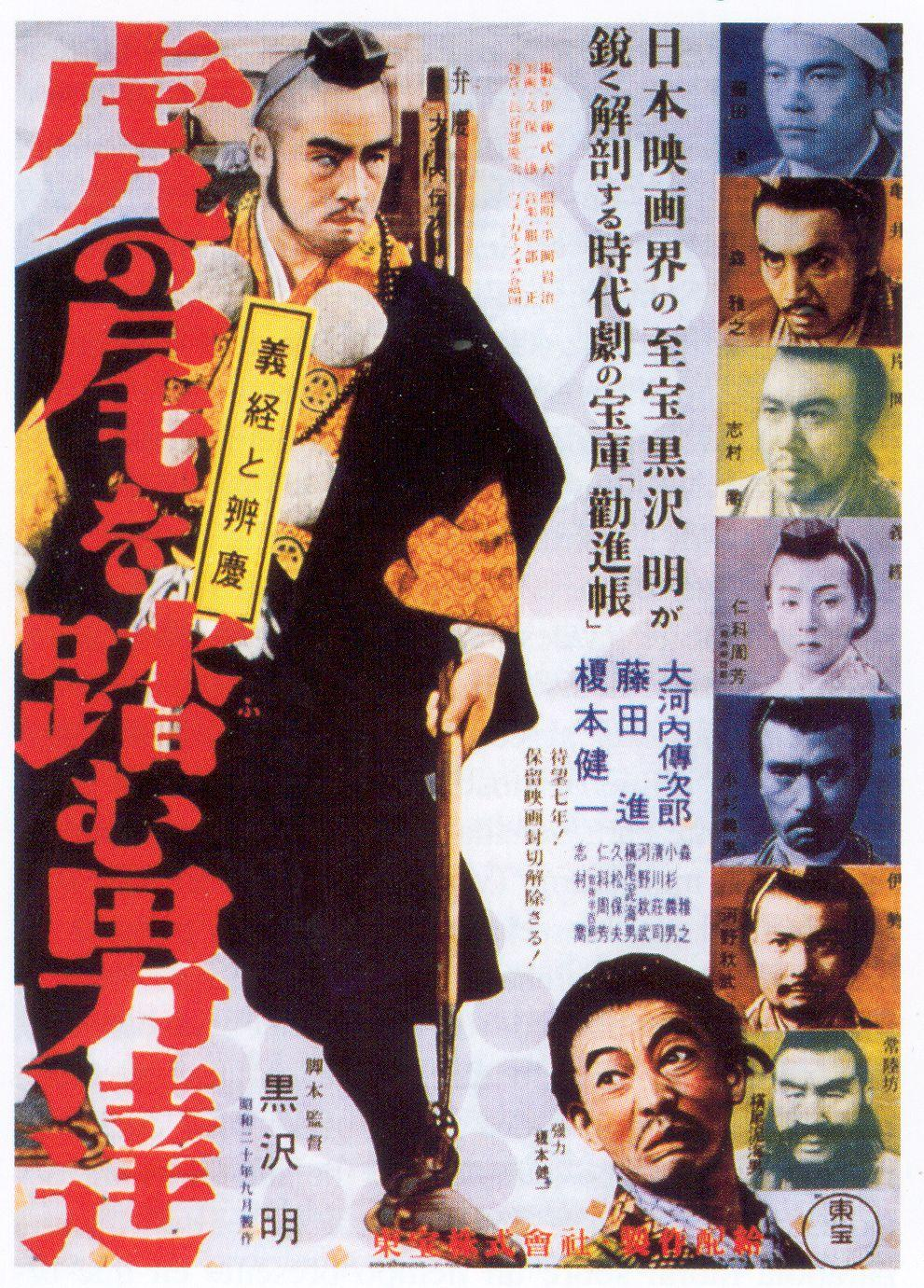
- Born: 15 September 1903; Kamitsuga District, Tochigi, Japan
- Died: 12 March 1968 (aged 64)
- Occupation: Actor
- Years active: 1924–1967

Yoshio Kosugi (小杉 義男, Kosugi Yoshio; 15 September 1903 – 12 March 1968) was a Japanese actor. He appeared in more than 120 films from 1924 to 1967.

== Career ==
First appearing on stage as a shingeki actor, he was initially recognized for his role as Yasha in The Cherry Orchard. He made his film debut in the 1920s and appeared in a number of films by Akira Kurosawa.

== Filmography ==
Year	Title	Role	Notes
1924	Chimata no ko	Kimpei	
1943	Sanshiro Sugata		
1945	The Men Who Tread on the Tiger's Tail		
1947	Snow Trail		
1952	The Skin of the South		
1954	Samurai I: Musashi Miyamoto		
1954	Seven Samurai	Farmer Mosuke	
1955	Half Human		
1955	The Lone Journey		
1955	So Young, So Bright		
1956	Romantic Daughters		
1956	The Legend of the White Serpent		
1957	The Mysterians		
1958	A Holiday in Tokyo		
1960	The Human Vapor		
1961	The Story of Osaka Castle		
1962	King Kong vs. Godzilla	Faro Island chief	
1964	Mothra vs. Godzilla	Chief of Infant Island	
1964	Ghidorah, the Three-Headed Monster	Chief of Infant Island	
1965	Frankenstein Conquers the World	Mountain Soldier	
1967	Japan's Longest Day	Minister of Public Welfare Keisuke Okada	
