= On Wings of Love =

- Film poster
- Directed by: Toshio Sugie
- Screenplay by: Toshirō Ide
- Based on: Three Types of Girls by Minoru Nakano
- Produced by: Sadao Sugihara
- Starring: Hibari Misora; Chiemi Eri; Izumi Yukimura
- Cinematography: Taiichi Kankura
- Music by: Yoshiyuki Kozu
- Production company: Toho
- Distributed by: Toho
- Release date: 13 July 1957 (Japan)
- Running time: 94 minutes
- Country: Japan

On Wings of Love (Japanese: 大当り三色娘, Hepburn: Ōatari sanshoku musume) is a 1957 Japanese romantic musical film directed by Toshio Sugie. It was Toho's highest-grossing film of the year and the first film released in Tohoscope.

== Cast ==
The main cast of On Wings of Love are:

- Hibari Misora
- Izumi Yukimura
- Setsuko Wakayama
- Yaeko Izumo
- Tsuneko Ozawa
- Chiemi Eri
- Akira Takarada
- Shinji Yamada
- Sumiko Koizumi

== Production ==
On Wings of Love was the third film in the Sannin Musume series of romantic musical films featuring the “Sannin musume” (Three daughters), Hibari Misora, Chiemi Eri and Izumi Yukimura . It was the last film they made together before moving on to solo careers - reuniting briefly in 1964 for one last movie outside the trilogy.

== Release ==
On Wings of Love was released theatrically in Japan on 13 July 1957 where it was distributed by Toho. It was the first film released in Toho Scope, Toho's 2.35:1 anamorphic wide screen system.

The film was Toho highest-grossing film of 1957 and the only film to make the top ten highest-grossing films in Japan in 1957, at ninth place.

== Reception ==
The popularity of the stars, and the novelty of the wide screen format the movie had been produced in, meant that there was a lot of interest from the public. It was Toho’s highest earning movie of the year.
