= Toshio Sugie =

Japanese film director

Toshio Sugie (杉江敏男, Sugie Toshio; 24 September 1913 – 10 October 1996) was a Japanese film director. He directed films from the 1940s to the 1960s.

== Career ==
Sugie was born in Shizuoka City, Shizuoka Prefecture (currently Shimizu Ward, Shizuoka City). After graduating from the Waseda University, Sugie joined P.C.L/Photo Chemical Laboratory (which later became Toho) in 1937. He worked as an assistant director for Kajiro Yamamoto, Shiro Toyoda, Yasujiro Shimazu, Mikio Naruse, and Akira Kurosawa. In 1950, he directed his first feature film, The Gate of Tokyo. After this, Sugie directed romance dramas (such as I Can't Say The Person's Name and Oblivion Petals), and youth movies such as Janken Musume. He even supported Toho as a location director who filmed in various places with the comedy "Company President Series" starring the Crazy Cats.

Sugie directed 68 films in less than 20 years. He produced 6 in 1955 alone, in addition to 7 in 1956, 5 in 1957, 4 in 1958, 4 in 1959, 5 in 1960, and 6 in 1961. He was the flagship of program pictures centered on so-called comedy films and youth films, but Sugie himself said he wanted to direct suspense films, such as Sanjûrokunin no jôkyaku and Death on the Mountain. His suspense works, which are rare among the director's filmography, are still highly evaluated.

From the latter half of the 1960s, the number of directors of theatrical films decreased due to the decline of the Japanese film industry, and he moved to the Toho TV Club to direct TV dramas.

== Filmography ==
- So Young, So Bright (ジャンケン娘 Janken musume) (1955)
- Romantic Daughters (ロマンス娘 Romansu musume) (1956)
- On Wings of Love (大当り三色娘 Ōatari sanshoku musume) a.k.a. Three Types of Girls (1957)
- Sengoku gunto-den or Saga of the Vagabonds (1959) (screenplay by Akira Kurosawa)
- Daigaku no Wakadaishō (大学の若大将 Sir Galahad in Campus) (1961)
