= Shirō Toyoda =

Japanese film director (1906–1977)

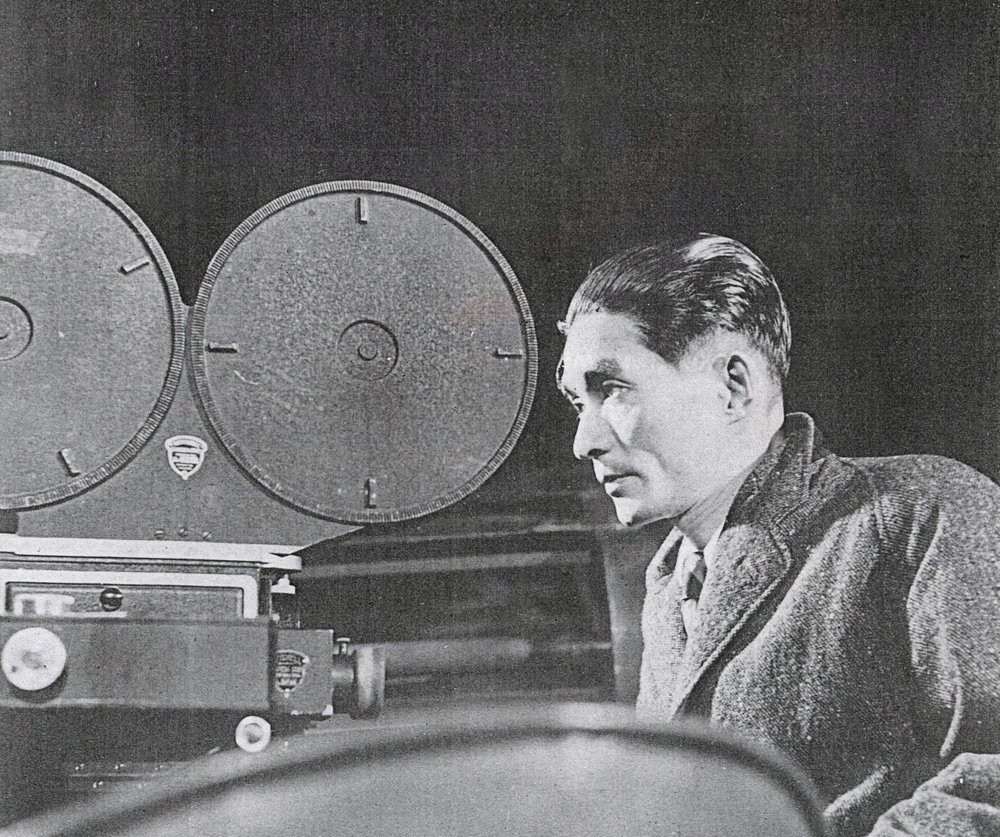
- Shirō Toyoda in 1938
- Born: 3 January 1906; Kyoto, Japan
- Died: 13 November 1977 (aged 71); Tokyo, Japan
- Occupations: Film director, screenwriter
- Years active: 1925–1976

Shirō Toyoda (豊田 四郎, Toyoda Shirō; 3 January 1906 – 13 November 1977) was a Japanese film director and screenwriter who directed over 60 films during his career which spanned 50 years. He was denoted for his high-quality adaptations of works of many important twentieth-century Japanese writers.

== Career ==
Born in Kyoto, Toyoda moved to Tokyo after finishing high school. Intent on becoming a theatre playwright at first, he studied scriptwriting under the pioneering film director Eizō Tanaka. He joined the Kamata section of the Shōchiku film studios in 1925 and worked as an assistant director under Yasujirō Shimazu, before giving his directorial debut in 1929. Forced to continue to work as an assistant director, and dissatisfied with the material he was given at Shochiku, he moved to the independent Tokyo Hassei Eiga Shisaku studio (later Toho). There he directed the successful Young People (1937) and gained a reputation for directing literary adaptations with a humanistic touch, in particular Uguisu (1938) and Spring on Leper's Island (1940).

After World War II, Toyoda adapted the works of writers like Yasunari Kawabata, Kafū Nagai, Naoya Shiga, Jun'ichirō Tanizaki and Masuji Ibuse for his films. Distinguished by their visual imagination and superb acting, they established Toyoda's reputation as an actor's director. Noted works of this era include The Wild Geese (1953), Marital Relations (1955), A Cat, Shozo, and Two Women (1956), Snow Country (1957) and The Twilight Story (1960). Working as closely with his cameramen and scenarists as with his actors, he relied on a steady group of collaborators, including cinematographers Kinya Kokura and Mitsuo Miura and scriptwriter Toshio Yasumi.

Toyoda died in Tokyo in 1977.

== Filmography ==
=== Director ===
- 1929: Irodorareru kuchibiru (彩られる唇)
- 1929: Tokai o oyogu onna (都会を泳ぐ女)
- 1930: Yūai kekkon (友愛結婚)
- 1930: Kokoro ogoreru onna (心驕れる女)
- 1935: Sannin no josei (三人の女性)
- 1936: Tōkyō-Ōsaka tokudane ōrai (東京−大阪特ダネ往来)
- 1936: Ōbantō kobantō (大番頭小番頭)
- 1936: Kamata Ōfuna sutajio no haru (蒲田 大船スタジオの春)
- 1937: Minato wa uwakikaze (港は浮気風)
- 1937: Oyake Akahachi (オヤケアカハチ)
- 1937: Young People (Wakai hito)
- 1937: Jūji hōka (十字砲火)
- 1938: Nakimushi kozo (泣蟲小僧)
- 1938: Fuyu no yado (冬の宿)
- 1938: Uguisu (鶯)
- 1940: Okumura Ioko (奥村五百子)
- 1940: Spring on Leper's Island (Kojima no haru)
- 1940: Ōhinata-mura (大日向村)
- 1941: Waga ai no ki (わが愛の記)
- 1943: Wakaki sugata (若き姿)
- 1946: Hinoki butai (檜舞台)
- 1947: Four Love Stories (四つの恋の物語 第一話 初恋, Yottsu no koi no monogatari)
- 1948: Waga ai wa yama no kanata ni (わが愛は山の彼方に)
- 1949: Hakucho wa kanashikarazuya (白鳥は悲しからずや)
- 1950: Onna no shiki (女の四季)
- 1951: Eriko to tomo-ni dai-ichi bu (えりことともに 第一部)
- 1951: Eriko to tomo-ni dai-ni bu (えりことともに 第二部)
- 1951: Sekirei no kyoku (せきれいの曲)
- 1952: Kaze futabi (風ふたゝび)
- 1952: Haru no sasayaki (春の囁き)
- 1953: The Wild Geese (Gan)
- 1954: Aru onna (或る女)
- 1955: The Grass Whistle a.k.a. Love Never Fails (麦笛, Mugibue)
- 1955: Marital Relations (Meoto zenzai)
- 1956: The Legend of the White Serpent (白夫人の妖恋, Byaku fujin no yoren)
- 1956: A Cat, Shozo, and Two Women (Neko to Shozo to futari no onna)
- 1957: Snow Country (Yukiguni)
- 1957: Evening Calm (夕凪, Yūnagi)
- 1958: Makeraremasen katsumadewa (負ケラレセン勝マデハ)
- 1958: The Hotelman's Holiday (喜劇 駅前旅館, Kigeki ekimae ryokan)
- 1959: A Flower Never Fades (花のれん, Hana noren)
- 1959: Dansei shiiku hō (男性飼育法)
- 1959: Pilgrimage at Night (暗夜行路, An'ya kōro)
- 1960: Chinpindō shujin (珍品堂主人)
- 1960: The Twilight Story (Bokuto kidan)
- 1961: The Diplomat's Mansion (東京夜話, Tokyo yawa)
- 1962: Till Tomorrow Comes (明日ある限り, Ashita aru kagiri)
- 1962: Ika naru hoshi no moto ni (如何なる星の下に)
- 1963: Madame Aki (憂愁平野, Yushu heiya)
- 1963: The Maid Story (台所太平記, Daidokoro taiheiki)
- 1963: Shin meoto zenzai (新・夫婦善哉)
- 1964: Kigeki yōki-na mibōjin (喜劇 陽気な未亡人)
- 1964: Sweet Sweat (Amai ase)
- 1965: Nami kage (波影)
- 1965: Illusion of Blood (Yotsuya kaidan)
- 1965: Tale of a Carpenter (大工太平記, Daiku taiheki)
- 1967: River of Forever (千曲川絶唱, Chikumagawa zesshō)
- 1967: Kigeki ekimae hyakku-nen (喜劇 駅前百年)
- 1968: Kigeki ekimae kaiun (喜劇 駅前開運)
- 1969: Portrait of Hell (Jigoku-hen)
- 1973: The Twilight Years (Kōkotsu no hito)
- 1976: Tsuma to onna no aida (妻と女の間)

=== Screenwriter ===
Scripts not realised by Toyoda himself:

- 1925: Yū no kane (夕の鐘)
- 1925: Aisai no himitsu (愛妻の秘密)
- 1926: Fukumen no kage (覆面の影)
- 1926: Mankō (万公)
- 1927: Koi o hirotta otoko (恋を拾った男)
- 1928: Yowaki hitobito (弱き人々) co-writer
- 1928: Shin'ya no okyaku (深夜のお客) co-writer
- 1936: Ipponto dohyo-iri (一本刀土俵入)

=== Actor ===
- 1952: Kin no tamago: Golden girl (金の卵 Golden Girl)

== Awards ==
- 1956: Blue Ribbon Award for Best Director for Marital Relations

== Legacy ==
Toyoda's films have repeatedly been shown at the Berkeley Art Museum and Pacific Film Archive as part of retrospectives, and three of his works added to the collection of the Museum of Modern Art in 1987.
