= Throw Away Your Books, Rally in the Streets =

1971 film by Shūji Terayama

- Theatrical release poster

Japanese name
- Kanji: 書を捨てよ町へ出よう
Transcriptions
- Revised Hepburn: Sho o suteyo machi e deyō
- Directed by: Shūji Terayama
- Written by: Shūji Terayama
- Based on: Sho o suteyo machi e deyō by Shūji Terayama
- Produced by: Shūji Terayama; Eiko Kujo
- Starring: Hideaki Sasaki; Masaharu Saitō; Yukiko Kobayashi; Fudeko Tanaka
- Cinematography: Masayoshi Sukita
- Edited by: Keiichi Uraoka
- Music by: J. A. Seazer; Itsurō Shimoda; Hiroyoshi Yanagida
- Production companies: Jinriki Hikōki Sha; Art Theatre Guild
- Distributed by: Art Theatre Guild
- Release date: April 24, 1971 (Japan)
- Running time: 137 minutes
- Country: Japan
- Language: Japanese
- Budget: ¥10 million

Throw Away Your Books, Rally in the Streets (Japanese: 書を捨てよ町へ出よう, Hepburn: Sho o suteyo machi e deyō) is a 1971 Japanese experimental film written and directed by Shūji Terayama in his feature-length directorial debut. The film was adapted from Terayama's 1967 essay collection and subsequent 1968 stage play of the same name, and stars Hideaki Sasaki, Masaharu Saitō, Yukiko Kobayashi, and Fudeko Tanaka. Centering on an unnamed protagonist navigating the counterculture of 1970s Tokyo, the film features a nonlinear narrative frequently interspersed with staged set pieces, street interviews, and musical interludes.

== Cast ==
- Hideaki Sasaki as Hideaki Kitamura (北村英明), the protagonist, referred to throughout only as "Me" (私)
- Masaharu Saitō as Masaharu Kitamura (北村正治), or the Father (父親)
- Yukiko Kobayashi as Setsuko Kitamura (北村セツ子), or the Sister (妹)
- Fudeko Tanaka as Hatsu Kitamura (北村ハツ), or the Grandmother (祖母)
- Sei Hiraizumi as Ōmi (近江)
- Akihiro Miwa as Maya of Hell (地獄のマヤ)
- Keiko Niitaka as Midori the Prostitute (娼婦みどり)
- Maki Asakawa as Prostitute on the Stairs (階段の娼婦)
- Izumi Suzuki as Female Doctor (女医)
- J. A. Seazer as Long-Haired Poet (長髪詩人)

== Production ==
=== Development ===
Throw Away Your Books, Rally in the Streets was first published as an essay collection in 1967. This publication laid the thematic groundwork for the film, exploring youth rebellion and the concept of musical expression as modern isolation. The material was adapted into a 1968 Tenjō Sajiki stage play of the same name, which toured Japan until 1970.

Throw Away Your Books was financed under the Art Theatre Guild's standard "ten million yen film" model, in which the ATG and the director contribute to the film's budget equally. To fund his half, director Shūji Terayama established the independent production company Jinriki Hikōki Sha.

=== Casting ===
Lead actor Hideaki Sasaki was cast following his performances in Terayama's 1968 stage play of the same name. Sasaki coincidentally shared the character's given name, Hideaki (英明), and his erratic, existential ethos. (Note: While official Japanese databases and cast billings romanize the given name 英明 as Hideaki, English-language scholars, including Steven C. Ridgely and Ferran de Vargas, have romanized the kanji using its alternate reading, Eimei.) Drag queen singer Akihiro Miwa was cast as the prostitute Maya of Hell, as a retooling of the actor's role as Marie in Terayama's 1967 play Kegawa no Marii.

== Release ==
=== Theatrical ===
The film premiered at the Art Theatre Shinjuku Bunka in Japan on April 24, 1971. Throw Away Your Books marked Terayama's feature-length directorial debut. (Note: Though Terayama's original cut of the film Emperor Tomato Ketchup was 75 minutes long, it was ultimately edited down to a 27-minute short film for its initial release.) Despite the film's anti-establishment themes and focus on the working class, its experimental form and limited distribution through the ATG distanced it from the general public.

=== Home media ===
Throw Away Your Books has only been distributed on home media in Japan. The film was released on Blu-ray by King Records on April 24, 2013, as part of a box set containing Terayama's ATG feature films.

== Reception ==
Kinema Junpo ranked the film as the 9th best Japanese film of 1971. At the 14th Mostra Internazionale del Film d'Autore in 1971, the film tied for the Grand Premio, the festival's highest honor.
