= Izumi Suzuki =

Japanese writer and actress (1949–1986)

- 鈴木いづみ
- Suzuki's 1968 high school graduation portrait
- Born: July 10, 1949; Itō, Shizuoka, Japan
- Died: February 17, 1986 (aged 36); Tokyo, Japan
- Education: Shizuoka Prefectural Itō High School
- Occupations: Novelist; short story writer; essayist; actress
- Years active: 1966–1983
- Spouse: Kaoru Abe (m. 1973; div. 1977)
- Children: 1

Izumi Suzuki (鈴木いづみ, Suzuki Izumi; July 10, 1949 – February 17, 1986) was a Japanese writer and actress, known for her science fiction stories and essays on Japanese pop culture. Married to avant-garde saxophonist Kaoru Abe from 1973 to 1977, she is also known for her association with photographer Nobuyoshi Araki.

== Life ==
Suzuki was born in Itō, Shizuoka in 1949. Her father Eiji Suzuki was a reporter for the Yomiuri Shimbun. After graduating from Shizuoka Prefectural Itō High School in 1968, she worked briefly as a keypunch operator at Itō City Hall. In 1969 she was selected as a runner-up for the New Writers' Award administered by the monthly literary magazine Shōsetsu Gendai and moved to Tokyo, where she found work as a hostess, nude model, and actress.

In 1973, Suzuki married avant-garde saxophonist Kaoru Abe, by whom she had a daughter, Azusa, in April 1976. Azusa did not come to live with Suzuki until the early 80s, however; in the interim she was raised by Suzuki's family in Shizuoka. In 1977 Suzuki divorced Abe (though they continued to live together); he died a year later from an overdose of Bromisoval. For a time she managed to support herself by publishing stories in sci-fi magazines, but eventually her health deteriorated, and she began receiving public assistance.

In February 1986, at the age of thirty-six, Suzuki committed suicide by hanging herself at home, orphaning her nine-year-old daughter.

Suzuki's tumultuous marriage to Abe was the subject of Endless Waltz, a 1992 novel by Mayumi Inaba, which prompted Suzuki's daughter to sue Inaba for invasion of privacy. Despite this, in 1995 the novel was adapted for film by Kōji Wakamatsu, an exponent of the pink film genre who had earlier directed Suzuki in his 1970 film Violence Without a Cause.

Japanese photographer Nobuyoshi Araki took portraits of Suzuki throughout her career. These photographs were compiled after her death in a collection titled Izumi,this bad girl. (Note: Published in Japanese in Japan, the book's cover displays the English words "Izumi,this bad girl." using no space after the comma and a period after "girl.") (Note: The title is an allusion to "This Bad Girl" (ジス・バッド・ガール, Jisu baddo gāl), a chapter in Suzuki's novel Set My Heart on Fire, most of the chapters of which take their names from song titles. The chapter in question is a reference to the 1968 song "This Bad Girl" by Group Sounds band The Golden Cups.) Araki's portraits of Suzuki have also been used on covers of Japanese reissues of her works as well as on foreign translations of her stories.

== Writing ==
In 1970, Suzuki was shortlisted for the Bungakukai Prize for New Writers, and from 1971 devoted herself to writing. In 1975, thanks to an introduction from the science fiction author Taku Mayumura, she published her first sci-fi short story, "Trial Witch," in S-F Magazine. She had initially met Mayumura when she made an appearance on the late-night television program 11PM in 1970, during which he suggested she try reading science fiction.

Suzuki belongs to the "Second Generation" of science fiction writers active in the 1970s, who broke free from the influence of American science fiction and developed an irreverent style all their own. Critic and scholar Takayuki Tatsumi calls Suzuki an "originator of the 'SF of Manners,' who makes the most of her well-developed camp sensibility." SF critic Nozomi Ōmori, a translator of Ted Chiang and Rudy Rucker, has described her 1982 story "Hey, It's a Love Psychedelic!" as a forerunner of cyberpunk.

The sensibility of Suzuki's science fiction has occasionally been likened to drag. Her work has also drawn comparison to the writing of Octavia Butler for its prescience about advanced technologies.

== Acting ==
Although her acting career was brief, Suzuki's work was varied, and she appeared in both pink films and on stage as a member of Tenjō Sajiki, the avant-garde theater troupe co-founded by Shūji Terayama.

In 1970, she appeared in a number of pink films under the name Naomi Asaka, beginning with her debut, A Virgin at Play, as well as Violence Without a Cause, directed by Kōji Wakamatsu, and the film adaptation of George Akiyama's controversial manga Zeni Geba, directed by Yoshinori Wada. On stage, Suzuki was a member of the cast of Tenjō Sajiki's 1970 play 人力飛行機ソロモン The Man-powered Plane Solomon. In January 1971 the troupe presented "Izumi Suzuki's Avant-Garde Theater Week," during which they staged her plays ある種の予感 A Kind of Premonition and マリィは待っている Marie is Waiting. Later that year, she accompanied Tenjō Sajiki to Paris and Amsterdam.

After the 1971 feature Throw Away Your Books, Rally in the Streets, directed by Shūji Terayama, her only film appearance appears to have been a 52-minute 16mm film called 家獣 House Beast, which was directed by Teiji Aoyama and released in 1979. The film has not been screened since the 1980s, however, and may be lost.

== In popular culture ==
The timing of Suzuki's death is a preoccupation of "The Unfertilized Egg," a short story by Junko Hasegawa, in which the main character, Moriko, who is also thirty-six, is haunted by the fact that Suzuki, Princess Diana and Marilyn Monroe all died at the same age, before their beauty or their powers waned.

== Selected bibliography ==
=== Japanese ===
- 愛するあなた The One I Love, Gendaihyōronsha, 1973
- あたしは天使じゃない I'm No Angel, Buronzusha, 1973
- 残酷メルヘン Cruel Fairytale, Seigashobō, 1975
- 女と女の世の中 Within a World of Women, Hayakawa Bunko, 1978
- いつだってティータイム Teatime Any Time, Byakuyashobō, 1978
- 感触 Touch, Kosaido Publishing, 1980
- 恋のサイケデリック! A Love Psychedelic!, Hayakawa Bunko, 1982
- ハートに火をつけて! だれが消す Set My Heart on Fire! Who Will Put it Out, San-Ichi Shobō, 1983
- 鈴木いづみプレミアム・コレクション Izumi Suzuki: The Premium Collection, Bunyūsha, 2006
- 契約 鈴木いづみSF全集 Covenant: The Complete SF of Izumi Suzuki, Bunyūsha, 2014

=== English ===
- Terminal Boredom, Verso Books, 2021 (short stories) ISBN 978-1-78873-988-7
- Hit Parade of Tears, Verso Books, 2023 (short stories) ISBN 978-1-83976-849-1
- Set My Heart on Fire, Verso Books, 2024 (novel), trans. Helen O'Horan ISBN 978-1-80429-330-0

=== Portuguese ===
- Tédio terminal, DBA Literatura, 2024 (short stories) - trans. Andre Cunha, Rita Kohl, Eunice Suenaga
- Incendeie meu coração, DBA editora, 2026 - trans. Jefferson José Teixeira

=== Italian ===
- Noia terminale, ADD Editore, 2024 (short stories) - trans. Ozumi Asuka
- Hit parade di lacrime, ADD Editore, 2025 (short stories) - trans. Ozumi Asuka
- Un mondo pieno di vuoto, ADD Editore, 2026 (short stories) - trans. Ozumi Asuka

=== Spanish ===
- Aburridísima, consonni ediciones, 2025 (short stories) - translator: Tana Oshima; foreword: Chenta Tsai

== Selected filmography ==
=== As Naomi Asaka ===
- 処女の戯れ A Virgin at Play (Million Film) 1970
- 売春暴行白書・性暴力を斬る White Paper on the Violation of Prostitutes: Sexual Violence (Million Film) 1970
- 女性の性徴期 A Woman's Sexual Development (Million Film) 1970
- 絶妙の女 The Perfect Woman (Kantō Movies) 1970
- 情炎・女護ヶ島 Burning Passion: The Isle of Women (Kantō Movies) 1970
- 理由なき暴行 現代性犯罪絶叫篇 Violence Without a Cause: The Scream of Modern Sex Crimes (Wakamatsu Productions) 1970

=== As Izumi Suzuki ===
- 銭ゲバ Zeni Geba(Kindai Hōei) 1970
- 書を捨てよ街へ出よう Throw Away Your Books, Rally in the Streets (Art Theater Guild/Jinriki Hikōki) 1971

== See also ==
- Japanese science fiction
- Kaoru Abe
- Kōji Wakamatsu
- Pink film
