= Pastoral: To Die in the Country =

1974 film directed by Shūji Terayama

- Theatrical release poster

Japanese name
- Kanji: 田園に死す
Transcriptions
- Revised Hepburn: Den-en ni shisu
- Directed by: Shūji Terayama
- Written by: Shūji Terayama
- Based on: Den-en ni shisu by Shūji Terayama
- Produced by: Shūji Terayama; Eiko Kujo; Kinshirō Kuzui; Yumi Govaers
- Starring: Kantarō Suga; Hiroyuki Takano; Chigusa Takayama; Kaoru Yachigusa; Isao Kimura
- Cinematography: Tatsuo Suzuki
- Edited by: Sachiko Yamaji; Ryūsuke Ōtsubo; Hiroshi Asai
- Music by: J. A. Seazer
- Production companies: Jinriki Hikōki Sha; Art Theatre Guild
- Distributed by: Art Theatre Guild
- Release date: December 28, 1974 (Japan)
- Running time: 101 minutes
- Country: Japan
- Language: Japanese
- Budget: ¥10 million

Pastoral: To Die in the Country (Japanese: 田園に死す, Hepburn: Den-en ni shisu; lit. 'To Die in the Countryside'), also known as Pastoral Hide and Seek (French: Cache-cache pastoral), is a 1974 Japanese experimental surrealist film written and directed by Shūji Terayama. Adapted from Terayama's 1965 tanka poetry collection and a 1962 television drama he scripted—both sharing the film's Japanese title—the film stars Kantarō Suga, Hiroyuki Takano, Kaoru Yachigusa, and Isao Kimura. Employing a film-within-a-film structure, it depicts an adult director (Suga)—a stand-in for Terayama—who encounters resistance from his younger self (Takano) as he attempts to complete a cinematic reimagining of his rural adolescence.

Pastoral was released in Japan on December 28, 1974. Co-produced by Art Theatre Guild and Terayama's independent production company Jinriki Hikōki Sha, both parties split the film's budget equally as part of ATG's 10-million-yen film initiative. Terayama, a prominent fixture of the underground (angura) scene, employed members of his avant-garde theatre troupe Tenjō Sajiki as cast and crew, including J. A. Seazer, who composed the film's psychedelic rock score. The film was distributed exclusively through ATG's dwindling network of art house cinemas, resulting in a limited domestic theatrical release. It was entered into the 1975 Cannes Film Festival, where it was nominated for the Palme d'Or.

== Plot ==
In a rural village in Aomori Prefecture at the foot of Mount Osore, a fifteen-year-old boy lives with his overbearing widowed mother. He becomes infatuated with the married woman living next door and witnesses an unwed woman giving birth to an illegitimate child, drawing the village's condemnation. Following an argument with his mother, the boy visits his father's grave on the mountain. Speaking through a local oracle, he expresses his frustrations and declares his intention to leave home the following spring. When a traveling circus arrives, he becomes fascinated by a performer in an inflatable costume and covets her wristwatch. After he asks his mother to buy him one, she refuses, insisting that time belongs in the household, with their large, broken clock being all they need. Prompted by the boy mentioning having never been on a train, the married woman admits being unhappy with her marriage and asks him to help her elope to Tokyo by train. He agrees and sneaks out of the house at night while his mother sleeps.

Abruptly, the film ends, and the previous events are revealed to have been part of an autobiographical film. The adult director leaves the Shinjuku screening room with a film critic colleague to go to a bar. The director discusses a creative block he's facing and expresses concern that he has exploited and romanticized his own childhood. The colleague argues that fictionalizing memory is a means of liberation, and questions whether a person's present self would still exist if they were to travel back in time and kill their own great-grandmother. The director concludes that he has already done so, rendering his existence a paradox. Returning to the cutting room, the director finds his younger self waiting and confronts the fact that he has embellished and distorted his childhood memories.

After the locals notice a birthmark on the unwed mother's infant, they threaten her and drive her away. The elopement is presented as it happened. When the boy tries to sneak out of his house, his mother wakes up and tries to stop him from leaving. He manages to fend her off and flees, setting off to find the married woman before the train leaves. He discovers her with her lover in a hut on Mount Osore, where she denies having ever made a promise to him. As her lover invites the boy to sit down, she recounts her history of wartime trauma, family death, poverty, and forced prostitution. The director, unable to continue editing, physically re-enters his childhood and intercepts his younger self after the lover sends the boy out to buy sake. As they return to the hut together, they discover that the married woman and her lover have committed suicide by strangulation. Meanwhile, the locals blame the unwed woman's infant for a local dog's death and continue to drive her away. Later, she and the infant vanish. The director observes the traveling circus, where the performer in the inflatable costume has been abandoned by her husband, although she insists that he will return.

Playing chess in a field, the director and the boy discuss the unrelenting nature of time. When the boy speaks about his desire to leave home, the director tells him to kill his mother instead, arguing that the boy's love for her is exactly why she has to die. On his way to get a weapon from the house, the boy encounters a modern version of the unwed mother; she rapes him and offers to take him to Tokyo, prompting the boy to abandon his task. When his younger self fails to return, the director enters the house to commit the murder himself, only for his mother to casually greet him as if he were still a teenager. As they sit down to eat, the director states to the boy that the two of them are merely characters he invented, acknowledging that his cinematic attempt to recreate his past and kill his mother has failed. Reciting his birthdate, he questions his identity and reality, claiming to be simultaneously in both Shinjuku and on Mount Osore at once. Suddenly, the set walls collapse, revealing that the pair are eating at a busy pedestrian crossing in modern Shinjuku. As they continue their meal, characters from the film walk through the frame and disappear into the busy city crowd.

== Cast ==
- Kantarō Suga as "Me" (私), an adult film director who serves as a surrogate for Terayama.
- Hiroyuki Takano as "Me" as a boy (少年時代の私), the director's younger self.
- Chigusa Takayama as My Mother (私の母), the boy's overbearing, widowed mother.
- Kaoru Yachigusa as the Woman Next Door (人妻化鳥), a married neighbor the boy attempts to elope with.
- Isao Kimura as the Film Critic (批評家), the adult director's colleague.
- Yoshio Harada as Arashi (嵐)
- Masumi Harukawa as the Inflatable Woman (空気女)
- Keiko Niitaka as Soi (草衣)
- Izumi Hara as the Phantom Old Woman (イタコ幻婆)
- Yoko Ran as the Hunchback Girl (せむしの少女)
- Kan Mikami as Cow (牛)
- J. A. Seazer as Tengu Kurama (鞍馬天狗)

== Production ==
=== Development ===
Shūji Terayama had used the film's Japanese title, Den-en ni shisu, as the name for several previous works, including a 1962 essay, a 1962 television drama, and a 1965 tanka poetry collection. The television drama, written by Terayama, aired on October 22, 1962 on NTV's Love Theater anthology series, featuring a premise that later became the film's core subplot: a young man's attempt to elope to Tokyo with a married woman. Kaoru Yachigusa, who played the role of the married woman—named "Miki" in the broadcast—later reprised it for the film. Terayama incorporated several of his tanka, including 13 from his 1965 book of the same name—most verbatim, some reworked—into the film's visuals and voice-over. As his third poetry collection, the book heavily influenced the film's themes, including its central imagery, rural mythology, and autobiographical structure.

=== Pre-production and production ===
The film's modest budget of ¥10 million (Note: Equivalent to ¥22.8 million in 2024)—at a time when average studio films cost ¥40–50 million (Note: Equivalent to ¥91.3 million to ¥114 million in 2024)—was standard for the Art Theatre Guild. As part of ATG's "10-million-yen film" initiative, financing was split evenly between ATG and the director. Terayama's half was raised through his independent production company, Jinriki Hikōki Sha, which he had established prior to the release of his previous feature film, Throw Away Your Books, Rally in the Streets (1971).

Employing his unconventional production methods, Terayama cast actors before writing the film's script. Terayama initially intended to play the role of the adult director himself, but he abandoned the idea after opposition from his staff. During pre-production, Terayama scouted locations on the Shimokita Peninsula in Aomori Prefecture alongside art director Kiyoshi Awazu and cinematographer Tatsuo Suzuki. To ensure the accuracy of the film's folklore elements, Terayama hired Chūzaburō Tanaka, then director of the Ogawarako Folk Museum, as the production's folklore researcher. Filming began on October 3, 1974, taking place at Mount Osore and Shichinohe in Aomori.

=== Music ===
The film's psychedelic rock score was composed by J. A. Seazer, who, after joining Terayama's theatre troupe Tenjō Sajiki in 1969, became his principal musical collaborator. Seazer appears in the film as Tengu Kurama, alongside folk singer Kan Mikami, who appears in the film performing his own music. The film's soundtrack was released on vinyl by CBS/Sony on December 21, 1974, a week prior to the film's release.

== Release ==
=== Theatrical ===
Pastoral was released in Japan on December 28, 1974. The film received a limited theatrical release through ATG's network of art house cinemas, which had dwindled from its peak of ten venues due to low profits. It was the final film screened at the Art Theatre Shinjuku Bunka before the venue's closure at the end of the year.

In May 1975, the film was selected to screen at the 1975 Cannes Film Festival, where it competed for the Palme d'Or, losing to Chronicle of the Years of Fire. Later that year, at the 11th Chicago International Film Festival, the film competed for the Gold Hugo, the festival's highest honor.

=== Home media ===
Despite competing at major film festivals, Pastoral—like Terayama's other films—has never received an official home media release outside Japan. King Records first released the film on VHS in January 1997 as part of its Art Theatre Guild retrospective catalog. Pioneer LDC later distributed the film on DVD on October 25, 2001. King Records subsequently reacquired the distribution rights and issued the film as part of a Blu-ray box set on April 24, 2013.

== Reception ==
Kinema Junpo ranked the film as the 6th best Japanese film of 1974. Terayama was nominated for two categories at the 29th ACA National Arts Festival, winning the Encouragement Award for New Artists and the Arts Selection Award for New Artists. Yoshio Harada won the Blue Ribbon Award for Best Supporting Actor in 1976 for his performance in the film, shared with his role in Preparation for the Festival.

== Legacy ==
Pastoral is considered a landmark film of the Japanese New Wave and angura movements. In a 1989 film poll by Bungeishunjū, Pastoral was ranked the 112th best Japanese film of all time.

Independent filmmaker Yoshihiko Matsui, whose debut work Rusty Empty Can (1979) brought him to the attention of Terayama himself, cited Pastoral as the film that inspired him to pursue directing. The film's artistic liberty also helped launch the career of experimental filmmaker and manga artist Isao Yamada, who began his artistic career in Tenjō Sajiki and made his film debut in Pastoral as a design coordinator.

The director Kunihiko Ikuhara was heavily inspired by Pastoral, particularly its theatrical and psychological themes, with Ikuhara and screenwriter Yōji Enokido studying the film extensively during the conception of the animated series Revolutionary Girl Utena (1997). Ikuhara subsequently recruited J. A. Seazer to compose Utena's duel music, with Seazer drawing from the psychedelic rock scores he composed for Terayama's films.
