= The Great Buddha Arrival =

- Theatrical release poster by Yoshiki Takahashi
- Directed by: Hiroto Yokokawa
- Screenplay by: Hiroto Yokokawa; Yuki Yonezawa; Kazuma Yoneyama, Kensaku Sakai
- Based on: The Great Buddha Arrival: Chukyo Edition by Yoshiro Edamasa
- Produced by: Hiroto Yokokawa; Avery Guerra
- Starring: Kazuma Yoneyama; Philip Granger; Shelley Sweeney; Norman England; Peggy Neal; Akira Takarada; Akira Kubo; Yukiko Kobayashi; Yukijiro Hotaru; Bin Furuya
- Cinematography: Hiroto Yokokawa
- Edited by: Hiroto Yokokawa
- Music by: Hiromi Shinoda
- Production company: 3Y Film
- Distributed by: 3Y Film
- Release date: December 2018
- Running time: 50 minutes
- Country: Japan
- Languages: Japanese; English
- Budget: ¥3 million

The Great Buddha Arrival (Japanese: 大仏廻国, Hepburn: Daibutsu Kaikoku) is a 2018 Japanese kaiju film directed by Hiroto Yokokawa. The film was based on the lost 1934 film of the same name, made with the cooperation of director Yoshiro Edamasa's grandson. Additional footage with new actors was shot to extend the film's run time for international distribution. Still more footage was shot for a Japanese theatrical release, termed the Final Edition. This last release occurred on September 4, 2020.

== Background ==
After the release of the 2014 Godzilla remake, director Hiroto Yokokawa was introduced by a friend to the existence of The Great Buddha Arrival a film made in 1934 that is now considered one of the earliest kaiju films. In 2016, he contacted Kazuyoshi Fohara, the grandson of Yoshiro Edamasa, and the project of creating a remake began.

== Production ==
Actors who have appeared in Tokusatsu films (such as Godzilla, Gamera) that influenced Yokokawa, such as Akira Takarada and Yukijiro Hotaru, were asked to appear in the film. Although 80% of the offers were declined, some tokusatsu actors decided to appear because "Mr. Takarada will appear".

Part of the production cost was raised by crowdfunding. In particular, a description of the project that was translated into English by producer Avery Guerra and published on Yahoo! News, created interest in the project. In addition a few overseas actors such as Philip Granger decided to appear, which further led to international knowledge of the project.

== Home media ==
As of 2023, the film is available to stream on Amazon Prime.

== Cast ==
- Masanori Kikuzawa as Yoshiro Edamasa
- Kazuma Yoneyama as Murata
- Shelley Sweeney as Canadian interviewer
- Philip Granger as President of the United States
- Peggy Neal as Dr. Mary Lisa Gleason
- Norman England as American newscaster
- Akira Kubo as Prime Minister Maki
- Iwata Momoka as Momorun
- Akira Takarada as Storyteller
- Yukiko Kobayashi as Yuko Murata
- Yukijiro Hotaru as Detective Osaki
- Shiro Sano as Newscaster Miyakura (Final Edition)
- Bin Furuya as Kazuyoshi Edamasa (Final Edition)
- Yuma as Kitayama
- Ai Aoki as Female suicide
- Takashi Yasuda as Reporter Kayama
- Iku Hasegawa as Emasasa's sweetheart
- Yoshiro Uchida as Mayor Sakurai
- Ippei Osako as Producer Tanaka
- Yuki Morita as Announcer Sakano
- Inge Murata as Chancellor of Germany
- Toshi Toda as Maxwell (Toshi) James
- Yoshihiko Otsuki as Physicist
- Junichiro Nirasawa as Paranormal researcher
- Robert Scott Field as Mysterious person
- Takahiro Yamakawa as Great Buddha
- Ryotaro Fujiyama as Witness in crowd
- Francisco de Borja De la Bella as Social Media celebrity

== See also ==
- Nezura 1964
