= Emperor Tomato Ketchup =

Emperor Tomato Ketchup may refer to:

- Emperor Tomato Ketchup (film), a 1970 Japanese film directed by Shūji Terayama
- L'Empereur Tomato-Ketchup, a 1986 single by the French punk group Bérurier Noir
- Emperor Tomato Ketchup (album), a 1996 album by UK band Stereolab
