= Asakawa Maki no Sekai =

Studio album / live album by Maki Asakawa
- Released: September 1970
- Label: Toshiba

Maki Asakawa chronology
Asakawa Maki no Sekai (1970)	Maki II (1971)

Asakawa Maki no Sekai (Japanese: 浅川マキの世界; lit. 'The World of Maki Asakawa') is the debut album by Japanese musician Maki Asakawa, released in September 1970 by Toshiba Records.

A number of the tracks were co-written with Shūji Terayama, though the album contains covers of the American folk standard "(Sometimes) I Feel Like a Motherless Child" and Salvatore Adamo's "Tombe la neige". She made her name with the album, and at the time of her 2010 death, "Yo ga Aketara" and "Kamome" (the album's first and seventh tracks) were among her best-known songs.

== Track listing ==
1. 夜が明けたら ("Yo Ga Aketara") – (3:45)
2. ふしあわせという名の猫 ("Fushiawase to Iu Na no Neko") – (2:57)
3. 淋しさには名前がない ("Sabishisa Niwa Namae Ga Nai") – (4:51)
4. ちっちゃな時から ("Chicchana Toki Kara") – (3:00)
5. 前科者のクリスマス ("Zenkasha no Christmas") – (3:33)
6. 赤い橋 ("Akai Hashi") – (4:16)
7. かもめ ("Kamome") – (4:15)
8. 時には母のない子のように(Live) ("Sometimes I Feel Like A Motherless Child (Live at Sasoriza / 1968)") – (2:19)
9. 雪が降る(Live) ("Tombe la neige (Live At Sasoriza / 1968)") – (5:06)
10. 愛さないの愛せないの(Live) ("Aisanai No Aisenai No (Live at Sasoriza / 1968)") – (4:27)
11. 十三日の金曜日のブルース(Live) ("Jyuusannichi No Kinyoubi No Blues (Live at Sasoriza / 1968)") – (4:56)
12. 山河ありき(Live) ("Sanga Ariki (Live at Sasoriza / 1968)") - (3:32)

== See also ==
- 1970 in Japanese music
