= Sometimes I Feel Like a Motherless Child =

Traditional spiritual song

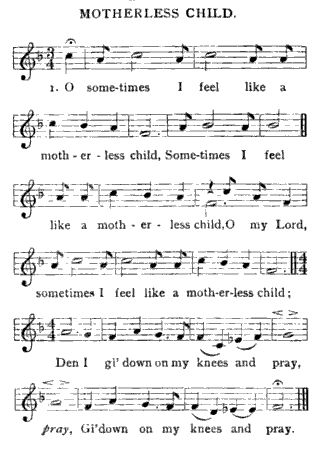
Original score of "Motherless Child" by William E. Barton, D.D., 1899.

"Sometimes I Feel Like a Motherless Child", also "Motherless Child", is a traditional spiritual. It dates back to the era of slavery in the United States.

An early performance of the song was in the 1870s by the Fisk Jubilee Singers. Commonly heard during the Civil rights movement in the United States, it has many variations and has been recorded widely.

== Description ==
The song is an expression of pain and despair as the singer compares their hopelessness to that of a child who has been torn from its parents. Under one interpretation, the repetition of the word "sometimes" offers a measure of hope, as it suggests that at least "sometimes" the singer does not feel like a motherless child.

== Renditions ==
- Samuel Coleridge-Taylor arranged the song as the first movement of his Trio in E minor of 1893.
- Multiple recordings of the song were made by Paul Robeson, starting in 1926.
- During WWII, In 1942, Wings Over Jordan Choir recorded the song on Columbia Masterworks and others classifying it and all Negro Spirituals as American classical music and giving it national and international acclaim. https://digitalcollections-baylor.quartexcollections.com/Documents/Detail/wings-over-jordan/2544531?item=2544545
- Mahalia Jackson recorded the song for her album Bless This House in 1956.
- Bessie Griffin and The Gospel Pearls recorded the song on their Portraits in Bronze album in 1960.
- Odetta performed the song at Carnegie Hall on April 8, 1960. The song was included on her album, Odetta at Carnegie Hall the same year. This version was part of the soundtrack of Pier Paolo Pasolini's The Gospel According to St. Matthew (1964).
- Mary Travers performed the song on Peter, Paul and Mary's album: A Song Will Rise (1965) and on Milt Okun's album: Something to Sing About in 1968.
- Esther & Abi Ofarim recorded the song for their album Das Neue Esther & Abi Ofarim Album (1966).
- Sweetwater recorded the song on their self-titled debut album, and often opened their live performances with it.
- Richie Havens performed a historical rendition of the song – retitled "Freedom (Motherless Child)" – on August 15, 1969 at the opening of the Woodstock festival.
- Elvis Presley used the first verse of the song to open the gospel sequence in his Comeback Special in 1968, sung by Darlene Love.
- Jimmy Scott recorded this song in 1969 for his album The Source.
- Maki Asakawa recorded the song for her debut album The World of Maki Asakawa (1970).
- Nancy L. Dupree recorded a version of the song in 1977 as an introduction to her poem, "First Love" on her album Sweet Thunder: Black Poetry. The poem is about an adult trying to cope with the pain of never feeling loved by her mother.
- Thea Bowman, a Black Catholic religious sister, recorded the song in 1988 for the stereocassette, "Songs of My People". She then sang it at a meeting of the United States Conference of Catholic Bishops the next year, shortly before her death from cancer, while giving a speech on Black Catholic history and experience. The studio recording was re-released in 2020 for the 30th anniversary of Sister Bowman's death as part of the digital album, Songs of My People: The Complete Collection.
- Boney M. recorded a disco version of the song titled "Motherless Child" on their 1977 album Love for Sale with singer Liz Mitchell taking the lead vocal. She had previously recorded the song as part of Les Humphries Singers in 1971.
- Billy Preston recorded a version of the song titled "Motherless Child" on his 1978 album Behold!
- Van Morrison recorded a version for his 1987 album Poetic Champions Compose. In his rendition, writes biographer Brian Hinton, "it is 'Mother Ireland' whom Van is missing and his world weary vocals are like sobs of pain."
- Martin Gore recorded his rendition of the song (titled only "Motherless Child") on his 1989 EP Counterfeit.
- Crime & the City Solution recorded a version of the traditional song on their 1990 album Paradise Discotheque.
- Hootie and the Blowfish closed out their biggest-selling 1994 album Cracked Rear View with an a cappella rendition. It is a hidden track as its presence is not announced on the album's track listing. It is also the shortest track on the album, clocking in at only 53 seconds.
- Ghostface Killah recorded a hip-hop rendition of the song titled "Motherless Child" for his 1996 debut solo album, Ironman. The song features fellow Wu-Tang Clan member Raekwon and uses samples from O.V. Wright's rendition.
- Prince performed his rendition of the song at many concerts beginning in 1999.
- Tom Jones included a version on his 1999 album Reload, together with the British band Portishead.
- Soprano Barbara Hendricks sang it when she received the 2002 Prince of Asturias Award for the Arts.
- John Legend sang the song during the Hope for Haiti Now: A Global Benefit for Earthquake Relief telethon in 2010. The song is also included on his 2004 album, Solo Sessions Vol. 1: Live at the Knitting Factory.
- Alice Ella covered the song for the 2013 film Grand Piano, with actress Kerry Bishé lipsyncing her song on screen.
- Michael Kiwanuka recorded a version for the Man in the High Castle album.
- In 2022, Jazmine Sullivan recorded a rendition for the soundtrack of Baz Luhrmann's Elvis Presley biopic Elvis.
- Kassa Overall created a rendition of the song on his SHADES 3 mixtape in 2023.
