= Art Theatre Shinjuku Bunka =

Art venue in Japan, 1962 to 1974

Art Theatre Shinjuku Bunka (Japanese: アートシアター新宿文化 or 新宿文化劇場) is the flagship cinema of the Japanese independent film production and distribution company Art Theatre Guild (ATG) operated from 1962 to 1974. It provided a venue for films outside the Japanese studio system. In 1967, ATG opened the Theatre Scorpio (Japanese: 蝎座; Sasori-za) in the basement of Art Theatre Shinjuku Bunka, which was Japan’s first space to present experimental films in the form of a theatrical run. Art Theatre Shinjuku Bunka and Theatre Scorpio jointly became a hub for Japanese underground arts and cultures of the 1960s-70s.

== History ==
=== Establishment ===
Art Theatre Shinjuku Bunka (“Shinjuku Bunka” for short; “Bunka” means “culture” in Japanese) was formerly Shinjuku Eiga Theatre opened in July 1937 and was managed by Tōhō. In December 1937, it was renamed “Bunka News Theatre (Gekijō)” as a specialized hall for culture films (kulturfilm) and newsreels.

ATG was initiated by Kawakita Kashiko and established on November 15, 1961. Funded by the major studios led by Tōhō, ATG started as a distributor of foreign art films and was envisioned as a promoter and incubator of non-commercial cinema.

Shinjuku Bunka, launched on April 20, 1962, was one of the ten cinemas of ATG’s nationwide chains that showed films distributed and later the ones produced by ATG.

=== Operations and Interactions with ATG ===
The screening of Patriotism (Yūkoku, 1966) by Mishima Yukio at Shinjuku Bunka was a great success and since then ATG started to form the idea of producing films. From 1967, ATG began producing films outside the studio system which were referred to as “10 million yen movies (issenman-en eiga)” due to their modest budget. The first film ATG co-produced was the documentary A Man Vanishes (Ningen Jōhatsu, 1967) by Shohei Imamura.

Kuzui Kinshirō (葛井欣士郎), general manager and producer at Shinjuku Bunka, was pivotal in expanding Shinjuku Bunka into a comprehensive art theatre. Besides showing ATG titles, Kuzui brought in local experimental filmmakers’ works. Under his management, the pink eiga (pink film) that was turned into political propaganda and formal experiments became available to a large audience and a serious subject for film critics.

He also organized theatrical performances at Shinjuku Bunka when the films were over in the evenings since 1963, including plays written by Mishima Yukio and Kara Jūrō, and Ninagawa Yukio’s debut as a director. Shinjuku Bunka was the biggest sponsor of Terayama Shūji’s Tenjō Sajiki for the production of his plays and films.

=== Closing ===
After 1973, films made by ATG were much less radical than the earlier ones and most of ATG’s cinemas had bailed out because of insufficient profits and lack of foresight of the people in charge. In 1974, Shinjuku Bunka showed the last film, which was Pastoral: To Die in the Country (Den-en ni shisu, 1974) by Terayama Shūji and was closed after.

The current location is the Shinjuku Bunka Bldg with Cinem@rt Shinjuku and kino cinéma Shinjuku.

== Design ==
In 1962, the building of Shinjuku Bunka was painted a dark shade of grey inside-out, dim-lit, and was called “ossuary” (納骨堂, nōkotsudō) due to its appearance. The refurbishment was led by Kuzui and collaborated between artist Okamoto Tarō and stage designer Mitsubayashi Ryōtarō. Kuzui’s vision was to create a bold new type of cinema style, breaking the conventions from the look of the venue to the films shown. The grey tone referred to the fashion showroom in Paris, aiming to reduce decorations and enhance the function of encouraging concentrated film viewing. It was vividly isolated from the colours of the Shinjuku surroundings.

The location of the building in Shinjuku was important for the movie-viewing experience as the streets of Shinjuku were common stages of films shown and produced by ATG, including Diary of a Shinjuku Thief (Shinjuku Dorobō Nikki, 1969) and Funeral Parade of Roses (Bara no Sōretsu, 1969). When the audience walked out of the building after the movie, the scenery of Shinjuku from the film world and reality intertwined. Filmmakers who filmed in Shinjuku would aim for screenings at Shinjuku Bunka as the audience’s understanding of the Shinjuku zone was important in the appreciation of their works.

== Theatre Scorpio ==
The 8mm or 16mm films made by some artists were unsuitable for the large screen at Shinjuku Bunka, thus Kuzui decided to convert the basement into a small underground art space for screening small-gauge films.

On June 10, 1967, Theatre Scorpio (full name in Japanese: アンダーグラウンド蝎座; Underground Sasori-za) opened downstairs of Shinjuku Bunka. Sasori-za was named by Mishima Yukio, as a tribute to Kenneth Anger’s film Scorpio Rising (1963).

The first film shown there was thought to be the first Japanese experimental feature-length film, Adachi Masao’s Galaxy (Gingakei, 1967). Other notable events include Hijikata Tatsumi’s butoh dance performance.

It served as a night salon after the screening or performance and its frequent visitors such as Ōshima Nagisa and Teshigahara Hiroshi would meet, drink, and chat there. It provided a testing ground for collaboration among filmmakers, musicians, dancers, writers, performance artists, and others from various areas.

== Influence and Related Exhibitions ==
Shinjuku Bunka, along with Sasori-za, played a crucial role in Japanese film culture and the intersection of various art forms with cinema. It was a legendary nexus for Japan’s experimental art scene.

Together with the Sōgetsu Art Center, Shinjuku Bunka and Sasori-za became the centres of post-war avant-garde activities. They were also the favourite hangout spots for many young people and refuges for the New Left students to escape from the police, similar to the Fūgetsudō cafe.

=== Film ===
In 2012, MoMA and the Japan Foundation held the large-scale exhibition Art Theater Guild and Japanese Underground Cinema, 1960–1986, in conjunction with the exhibition Tokyo 1955–1970: A New Avant-Garde, to acclaim its achievements.

=== Graphic design ===
ATG reflected the goal of promoting quality art films in its fliers and programs. By encouraging up-and-coming artists of the time to experiment with different design approaches, ATG has elevated their graphics beyond advertising to artwork.

In 2016, Poster Hari’s Gallery exhibited approximately 50 posters of the performances and films of Shinjuku Bunka and Sasori-za.

In 2020, Kamakura City Kawakita Film Museum conducted The Revolutionary Film Posters of the Art Theatre Guild exhibition, showcasing works by artists including Awazu Kiyoshi and Yokoo Tadanori.
