= Kohei Ando =

Japanese experimental filmmaker (born 1944)

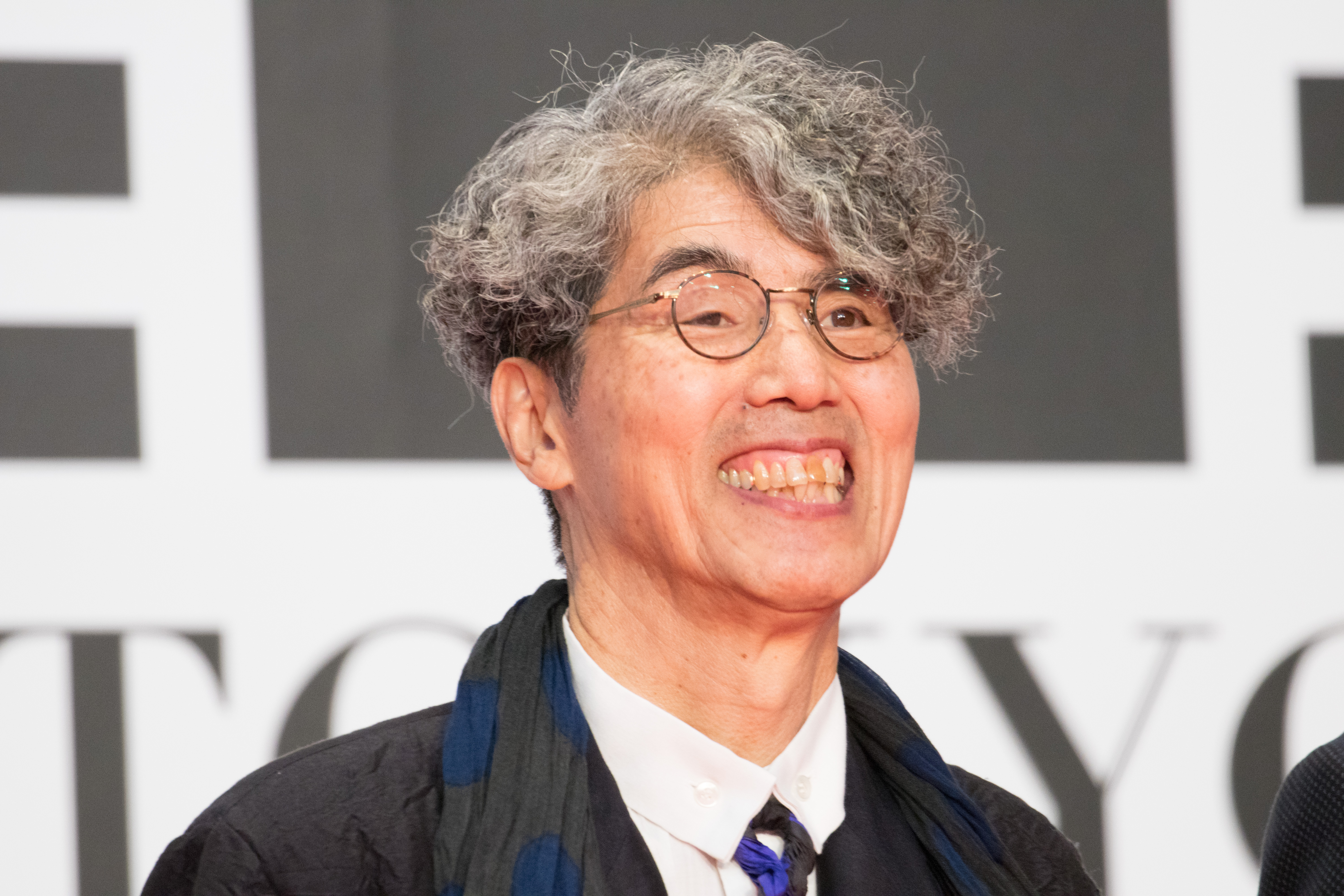
- Born: 1 February 1944 (age 82); Beijing, China
- Education: Waseda University
- Known for: Video Art and Experimental Filmmaking
- Notable work: Oh! My Mother (1969); Star Waars! (1978); My Collections (1988); Whispers of Vermeer (1998)

Kohei Ando (安藤紘平, Andō Kōhei; born 1 February 1944) is a Japanese experimental filmmaker, videographer, director, cinematographer, screenwriter, executive producer, and Professor Emeritus of Cinema at Waseda University. He is credited as one of the earliest figures in the rise of video art in Japan during the 1960s and 1970s, and a pioneer in Japanese experimental filmmaking.

Ando's rich artistic output is heavily influenced by his Waseda University education, participation in Shuji Terayama's avant-garde Tenjo Sajiki theatrical troupe, and interests in film, literature, and theater. He is celebrated as one of the first Japanese directors to employ image processing and video feedback with newly available video technology into the filmmaking process.

Throughout his career, Ando has created a diverse range of films whose narrative structures and visual designs are markedly different from one another, from the abstractionism of Oh! My Mother (1969) to the fusion of Western Art History and Japanese culture in Whispers of Vermeer (1998).

As a filmmaker and video artist, Ando's career is largely defined by his multidisciplinary nature in which he actively engaged in several projects that overlapped between his participation in Tenjo Sajiki, employment at the Tokyo Broadcasting System, and pursuit of independent filmmaking.

As of 2021, Ando's most recent film is a 2003 documentary on the French Post-Impressionist painter Henri Rousseau. Soon after his completion of the documentary short, Ando assumed teaching and advisory positions at his alma mater Waseda University in which he taught Cinema and launched the Kohei Ando Film Laboratory production company.

He is a member of the International Committee of the Directors Guild of Japan, and he serves as the Programming Advisor of the Tokyo International Film Festival.

== Early life and education (1944–1968) ==
Ando was born on 1 February 1944, in Beijing, China. He entered Waseda University in 1962 where he earned his bachelor's degree from the Faculty of Science and Engineering in 1968. During his undergraduate studies, Ando developed his passions for literature, film, and theater and chose to embark on a career in cinema. Additionally, his participation in a UNESCO Foreign Exchange program to the L’Ecole Centrale in Paris in 1965 further informed his decision to pursue filmmaking.

== Tenjo Sajiki (1967–1983) ==
In 1967, Ando partnered with fellow Waseda University student and avant-garde dramatist Shuji Terayama in his theatrical troupe Tenjo Sajiki, whose members included graphic artist Tadanori Yokoo and playwright/theater director Yutaka Higashi. Ando acted in Terayama's theatrical adaptation of Marcel Carne's 1945 film Les Enfants du Paradis (Children of Paradise). Ando was also employed as a Production Assistant in Terayama's company, and he traveled with the troupe during their performances across Japan, Europe, and the United States. In 1969, Ando, Terayama, and Tenjo Sajiki participated in the Experimenta 3 Festival at Frankfurt's Deutsche Akademie der Darstellenden Künste (German Academy of the Performing Arts) where they performed The Dog God.

Ando's collaboration with Tenjo Sajiki ended following Terayama's death in 1983.

== Early film career (1968–1978) ==
In 1968, Ando purchased a 16mm camera while in Paris with Tenjo Sajiki to officially launch his filmmaking career.

The following year, Ando created his first film, Oh! My Mother (1969). He encountered multiple challenges in the production process as there were aesthetic limitations to the available video technology and there were few colored televisions in the late-1960s. However, the filming of Oh! My Mother coincided with Ando's recent employment at the Tokyo Broadcasting System (TBS); he entered the studios after-hours to experiment with their equipment to explore the visual possibilities of video technology in a filmic context. The finalized film was accomplished through Ando's use of a feedback effect in which segments of the projected video proceeded through an infinite loop. Upon its completion, Oh! My Mother won an award at the Oberhausen Short Film Festival in Germany and was lauded as one of Japan's first films to utilize electronic imaging and video feedback.

== Video Hiroba ==
In the early-1970s, Ando became a member of the video art collective Video Hiroba. The organization's aims were to experiment with the aesthetics of video technology to create new types of images that responded to current social and political issues, present an alternative method to disseminate information, and fuse the mediums of video and performance art.

Ando's films of the 1970s appeared to lean in the direction of video and performance art combinations as he filmed his subjects in theatrical compositions. Ando's 1973 short film Les Fils/The Sons is a visual representation of a gay poem on the relationship between a man and his adopted adult sons. Entire scenes are washed in deep blue or fluorescent yellow lighting to convey the sensuality of the characters’ interactions with one another.

La Valse/Waltz (1976) focuses on an older woman seated at a table drinking tea before she rises to perform a waltz when classical music begins to play in the background. The careful organization of the scene – a centrally placed table framed by windows and columns before an open-floor space – is visually reminiscent of a proscenium stage set.

== Later film career (1978–2003) ==
Over the course of the 1970s and 1980s, Ando continued to film with a 16mm camera.

The official Japanese release of George Lucas's Star Wars (1977) in 1978 generated public enthusiasm and Mark Hamill's promotional visit to the country the same year led to extensive media coverage. Ando's short film Star Waars! (1978) reflected the popularity of the film in which individual men and women address the camera by excitedly shouting “War”. The short simultaneously demonstrated Ando's rising stature as a filmmaker through his procurement of multiple high-profile actors from popular 1970s Japanese film & television programs: Hiromi Go, Ikue Sakakibara, Tetsuya Takeda, Junko Ikeuchi, Haruko Mabuchi, Yoshiko Mita, Keiju Kobayashi, Kirin Kiki, Kiyoshi Kodama, Masao Komatsu, Chu Arai, Tetsuko Kuroyanagi, Yukari Itoh, Katusko Kanai, Kinya Aikawa, Midori Utsumi, Ikkei Kojima, and children's animated icon Leon the Lion.

In the mid-1980s, Ando's exposure to HD video technology at TBS compelled him to switch from 16mm formats to HD formats for his films; My Collections (1988) was the last film he completed in 16mm.

By the 1990s, Ando's films were more narrative-driven, had longer running times (roughly 25 to 50 minutes in length), and displayed more Surrealist imagery. After Twilight (1995) was one of the films that encapsulated the shift in his directorial style as the film's storyline progression is framed by photographic still images and the airbrush paintings of Kozo Mio while a man in voiceover narration discusses his love for a mysterious woman in a dream-like world.

In the late-1990s and early-2000s, Ando created several documentaries on the lives of European and Japanese artists, including: Sandro Botticelli, Caravaggio, Henri de Toulouse-Lautrec, Henri Rousseau, and Kozo Mio.

== Tokyo Broadcasting System (1968–2004) ==
Concurrent with his video art and experimental filmmaking, Ando established a steady career for himself with the Tokyo Broadcasting System where he was employed from 1968 to 2004.

Shortly after his arrival at TBS, Ando requested a three-month vacation to commit to Terayama's theatrical productions. While he anticipated his employment would be terminated before his return, Ando was surprised to learn that the company wanted him to stay and he surmised they felt “it might be good to keep a strange person like this [Kohei Ando] around”.

He was able to successfully give attention to both his professional responsibilities and personal creative projects. TBS afforded Ando and other directors a significant degree of creative freedom, to which he credits the company for permitting him to freely direct productions at the studio and to devote time to his non-TBS affiliated films.

Over the years, Ando's success in the TBS led to his promotion in multiple creative positions, including the assistant director of the Media Promotion Department and the Leader of HDTV Production. Additionally, Ando was heavily involved in commercial advertising where he directed album release announcements for pop idols Miyuki Nakajima and Tsuyoshi Nagabuchi and folk rock band Off Course, and promotional campaigns for Japan Airlines.

== Academia (2004–2014) ==
In 2004, Ando returned to his alma mater Waseda University and assumed teaching and advisory positions in their Graduate School of Global Information and Telecommunication Institute until 2014.

In December 2021, Ando will participate as a guest lecturer in the Visual Industry Promotion Organization's "Movie Producer Training" course in which he will speak about the importance of the role of the producer in the film industry.

== "Masters of Cinema" series ==
Ando was selected as one of multiple special lecturers for Waseda University's “Masters of Cinema” series throughout 2009 and 2010 in which he spoke about his career and filmmaking. He was a participant among a group of other prominent figures in the Japanese film industry: Yoji Yamada, Nobuhiko Obayashi, Masahiro Shinoda, Hirokazu Koreeda, et al.

== Kohei Ando Film Laboratory ==
The Kohei Ando Film Laboratory, established by Kohei Ando, is a production company based at Waseda University that finances independent short and feature-length films created by the university's student filmmakers.

While he was a student at Waseda, Malaysian filmmaker Edmund Yeo was funded for multiple short films between 2008 and 2010, and Ando served as his academic supervisor in his pursuit of a Masters and PhD in film.

== Film festivals ==
Along with his membership in the Directors Guild of Japan, Ando has been selected as an honorary member of numerous international film commissions and festival juries:

- 1999: The Margaret Mead Film Festival – New York, New York
- 1999: International Wildlife Film Festival – Missoula, Montana
- 2000: Festival International de Audio Visual – Biarritz, France
- 2016: Guanajuato International Film Festival – Guanajuato City, Mexico
- 2021: Beijing International Film Festival – Beijing, China

Ando has served as the Programming Advisor for the Tokyo International Film Festival since 2014, and he created the Festival's Japan Now section in 2015 to explore contemporary trends in Japanese cinema. In a 2018 interview with the Hollywood Foreign Press Association, Ando explained the necessity for Japan Now to feature mainstream films that appeal to both native Japanese and global audiences. When pressed further about the merits of mainstream Japanese films, Ando added that this particular type of film has the capacity to educate international viewers on Japanese culture and history.

For the 2018 installment of the Festival du Cinéma Japonais Contemporain Kinotaya in France, Ando assumed a programming role in which he introduced and screened 109 Japanese films for an event that commemorated the 160th anniversary of friendship between Japan and France.

In 2020, Ando served as a member of the 33rd Annual Tokyo International Film Festival's Selection Committee in tandem with his Programming Advisor position.

== Film style and themes ==
=== Style ===
Early in his career, Ando's films were shot with a 16mm camera. In 1985, Ando recognized the visual appeal for HD video production and began to create his subsequent films with this more advanced filming technology as it coincided with his ascension to the position of Leader of HDTV Production at TBS.

Oh! My Mother (1969) assumed an abstractionist approach to filmmaking in which Ando manipulated TBS video equipment. Through his implementation of looping and feedback, the image of a woman converges and fragments into a kaleidoscopic arrangement of varying colors and shapes coupled with soundbites of voices, heavy breathing, and classical music. Elements of abstractionism were utilized for several of his later films such as the distortion of colored lighting in both In Lusio (1971) and Les Fils/The Sons (1973).

Mise-en-scene cinematography has been a consistent element of Ando's camerawork during his 16mm and HD productions. La Valse/Waltz exhibits slower camera movements to mimic the gracefulness of the woman's dance to classical music. Similarly, the style of his much later film Whispers of Vermeer (1998) is meticulously organized to mirror the intimate, domestic genre paintings of Dutch Baroque painter Johannes Vermeer.

Video portraiture is frequently employed in which the camera remains fixed on individuals for seconds at a time. My Friends, In My Address Book (1974) is a filmic tribute to Ando's family, friends, neighbors, and colleagues as each person briefly poses with their respective address from his address book to the tune of Kay Starr's rendition of Come On A-My House; Shuji Terayama is one of the individuals who appears in the short film. Similarly, Star Waars! (1978) follows a much faster pace in which the camera zooms in on famous Japanese actors before they shout “War”.

=== Themes ===
Space, time, and memory are recurring themes that are strongly prevalent throughout his career. Imagery associated with home and sentimental, personal items often feature as motifs to reinforce these thematic elements as seen in My Collections (1988), a filmic self-portrait of Ando's life in which he documents objects and spaces within or near his house according to specific categories (family, shoes, flowers, etc.).

Similarly, the films Like a Passing Train 1 (1978) and Like a Passing Train 2 (1979) are conceptual studies of how a local train outside of Ando's house signifies the passage of time and his relationship to home.

On the Far Side of Twilight (1994) is an homage to Shuji Terayama that extensively focuses on the changing of the seasons, an exploration of the lifecycles from childhood to old age, and the personification of memories.

Shuji Terayama described Ando's film style as his way of "externalizing what is inside him and assembling a story. [He is] a writer with a strong interest in humans".

== Influences ==
Ando has cited a number of individuals from Japanese and international cinema who influenced his career aspirations and cinematic style:

- Japanese poet, playwright, and film director Shuji Terayama
- Lithuanian-American filmmaker, poet, and artist Jonas Mekas
- Italian cinematographer Vittorio Storaro
- Japanese experimental filmmaker Nobuhiko Obayashi
- Japanese director and screenwriter Nagisa Oshima

== Filmography ==
- Oh! My Mother (1969)
- Oh! My Father (1970)
- In Lusio (1971)
- Les Fils/The Sons (1973)
- My Friends, In My Address Book (1974)
- The Distance from the Screen (1975)
- La Valse/Waltz (1976)
- Star Waars! (1978)
- Like a Passing Train 1 (1978)
- Like a Passing Train 2 (1979)
- My Collections (1988)
- On the Far Side of Twilight (1994)
- After Twilight (1995)
- The World of Kozo Mio (1996)
- A Story About Kusanojo (1997)
- Whispers of Vermeer (1998)
- Henri de Toulouse-Lautrec (2003)
- Henri Rousseau (2003)

== Publications ==
=== Texts by Kohei Ando ===
- Introduction to Video Professionals: For the Creators of Film and Television (2004)
- Japanese translation of Syd Field's Screenplay: The Foundations of Screenwriting (2009)
- Japanese translation of Syd Field's The Screenwriter's Workbook (2012)
- Listen to the Words of the Movie (2018)
- Japanese translation of Syd Field's The Screenwriter's Problem Solver: How to Recognize, Identify, and Define Screenwriting Problems (2019)
- Whispers of Vermeer – Lapis Lazuli Dog (2021)

=== Publications on Kohei Ando ===
- Image That is Being Born/Emerging Footage: Experimental Filmmakers by Norio Nishijima (1991)
- Best TV Work of the Year – “On the Far Side of Twilight” by Nobuo Shiga (1995)
- People in The Theatrical Laboratory of Tenjo Sajiki by Sakumi Hagiwara (2000)
- Shuji Terayama and Kohei Ando – Heritage Evolves by Yoshikazu Shimizu (2018)

== Awards and honors ==
=== Awards ===
- 1969: "Oh! My Mother" at the Oberhausen Short Film Festival – Oberhausen, Germany
- 1975: Grand Prize for "The Sons" at Thonon Les Bains International Independent Film Fest. in France
- 1994: Astrolabium Award for "On the Far Side of Twilight" at the International Electronic Cinema Festival - Montreux, Switzerland
- 1994: Silver Maile Award for On the Far Side of Twilight at the Hawaii International Film Festival – Honolulu, Hawaii, USA
- 1996: Astrolabium Award for After Twilight and Best Director Award at International Electronic Cinema Festival – Montreux, Switzerland
- 1997: Lifetime Achievement Award of the International Electronic Cinema Festival – Montreux, Switzerland
- 1998: Grand Prix Astrolabium Award for "Whispers of Vermeer" at the International Electronic Cinema Festival - Montreux, Switzerland
- 1998: Grand Prize for "Whispers of Vermeer" at The Hivision Award - Tokyo, Japan

=== Honorary film screenings ===
- 1974: The Distance from the Screen at the opening ceremony of The Tokyo Metropolitan Art Museum
- 1975: Les Fils/The Sons – Thonen-les-Bains International Independent Film Festival, France
- 1979: Japanese Experimental Film – Centre Pompidou, Paris, France
- 1981: Rotterdam International Film Festival – Rotterdam, Netherlands
- 1982: American Federation of Arts
- 1983: The 7th Hong Kong International Film Festival – Hong Kong, China
- 1984: The Berlin International Film Festival – Berlin, Germany
- 1984: Edinburgh International Film Festival – Edinburgh, Scotland, United Kingdom
- 1985: 25 Years of Japanese Experimental Film – Museum of Modern Art, Saitama, Japan
- 1985: Sydney Japanese Film Festival – Sydney, Australia
- 1989: 1st Asian International Film Festival – Asia Society, New York, USA
- 1990: London Young Japanese Film Festival – London, United Kingdom
- 1991: The Japan Society, New York, New York, USA
- 1994: Oberhausen Short Film Festival – Oberhausen, Germany
- 1994: Maisons-Laffitte Film Festival – Maisons-Laffitte, France
- 1995: Paris International Film Festival – Paris, France
- 1996: Tampere International Film Festival – Tampere, Finland
- 1999: Margaret Mead Film Festival – New York, New York, USA

=== Honorary titles ===
2000: Chairman of the Jury of the International Audio-Visual Festival – Biarritz, France

== Exhibitions and retrospectives ==
=== Solo exhibitions ===
- 1978: Galerie Watari, Tokyo, Japan
- 1982: Image Forum, Tokyo, Japan

=== Group exhibitions ===
- 1983: Encounter with the Contemporary Japanese Art Landscape – Miyagi Prefectural Museum of Art, Miyagi, Japan
- 1985: Japan's Avant-Garde Art Future – Genoa Arts Festival, Genoa, Italy
- 1987: History of Japanese Experimental Film – Centre Pompidou, Paris, France
- 1994: Postwar Japanese Avant-Garde Art Exhibition – Yokohama Museum of Art, Japan

=== Retrospectives ===
- 2001: (Les Jeudis Cinemas Differents Du Collectif) Festival of Different Cinemas – Paris, France
- 2003: 9th Asian Film Culture Festival – Lyon, France
- 2010: Vital Signals: Early Japanese Video Art – Video Exhibition
- 2020: Kohei Ando, Like a Passing Train – Maebashi Literature Museum

== Collections ==
Ando's films are owned by multiple prestigious museums, galleries, and film archives throughout the United States, Europe, and Japan:

National Film Archive of Japan, Tokyo; Tokyo Metropolitan Art Museum, Tokyo; Setagaya Art Museum, Tokyo; Image Forum, Tokyo; Yokohama Museum of Art, Kanagawa; The Miyagi Museum of Art, Miyagi; The Museum of Modern Art, Saitama; Getty Center, Los Angeles; Fukuoka City Public Library, Fukuoka City; The Japan Society, New York; Light Cone, Paris.
