= Asura (2012 film) =

- poster

Japanese name
- Kanji: アシュラ
- Literal meaning: Asura
Transcriptions
- Revised Hepburn: Ashura
- Directed by: Keiichi Sato
- Screenplay by: Ikuko Takahashi
- Story by: Ikuko Takahashi; Agung Bagus
- Based on: Asura by George Akiyama
- Produced by: Yoshiyuki Ikezawa
- Starring: Masako Nozawa Megumi Hayashibara Bin Shimada Tesshō Genda Kinya Kitaōji
- Edited by: Junichi Masunaga
- Music by: Yoshihiro Ike Norihito Sumitomo Susumu Ueda
- Production company: Toei Animation
- Distributed by: Toei Company
- Release date: September 29, 2012 (Japan)
- Running time: 75 minutes
- Country: Japan
- Language: Japanese

Asura (Japanese: アシュラ, Hepburn: Ashura) is a 2012 Japanese anime film directed by Keiichi Sato and based on a manga of the same name by George Akiyama. The dark drama of Asura follows the struggles of a child, after being abandoned by his starving and impoverished mother, resorts to cannibalism and murders to survive during a terrible famine that ravaged medieval Japan. Asura tied for the Audience Award for Best Animated Feature at the 16th Fantasia International Film Festival in Montreal.

== Plot ==
In mid 15th-century Japan, flood, drought and famine transformed the landscape of Kyoto into a barren wasteland. More than 80,000 people perished between 1459 and 1461. This desolate state serves as the backdrop to the beginning of the country's greatest civil war. In this era, a boy is born to a starving and impoverished woman who abandons him. Eight years later, the boy has practically become a cannibalistic beast and wanders the countryside surviving in the wild with an axe which he uses to butcher his human preys with. He attacks a Buddhist monk, but the monk easily defends himself. The monk provides temporary food and shelter, and names the boy Asura. He teaches Asura a Buddhist chant hoping one day he would understand it. After a while, he leaves the boy on the side of the road and continues his travels.

Meanwhile, a man named Shichiro with four boys carry a huge log to their village. Asura attacks the group but is repelled by Shichiro. He follows them as they attempt to pass through a village where they are stopped by a group of boys demanding payment. The village boys throw rocks at them and when Asura is also hit, he angrily attacks and kills the leader. Later, the dead boy's father, Jito, chases Asura who falls off a cliff onto a pile of corpses. Asura is taken in by Wakasa, a girl from the village who gives him shelter and food in an abandoned hut. She returns regularly to bring him food and teach him how to speak. He becomes extremely attached to her, often secretly following her into the village.

One rainy night, as Asura waits for Wakasa outside, he sees her meet Shichiro and together they discuss leaving the village. In a fit of rage born of jealousy, Asura attacks Shichiro with his axe. Horrified by Asura's actions, Wakasa demands that he leave. Once again the boy is forced to wander alone. Shortly after his departure, the village is destroyed by a huge mudslide. The monk witnesses the death and destruction in the village and again stumbles upon Asura. However, this time, Asura speaks in the human tongue he learned from Wakasa, cursing himself and wishing he wasn't born. The monk chops off his own arm, provoking Asura to eat it. However Asura does not understand the monk's intentions and runs away instead.

Meanwhile, food has become even more scarce and Wakasa's father is encouraged to sell her by other villagers, but he refuses. Shichiro provides whatever food he can scrounge for Wakasa. In desperation, he resorts to stealing from other houses while Wakasa and her father lay dying in their home. On seeing Wakasa's condition, Asura kills one of Jito's horses and offers the horse flesh to her and her father, but she refuses to take it, believing it to be human flesh. Jito offers a bounty to capture Asura, and along with the villagers give chase with torches. Alone and afraid, Asura kills Jito and is then chased onto a rope bridge by the villagers. They set fire to the bridge, sending Asura into the river far below.

Winter arrives, covering everything in a blanket of snow. Shichiro and some village boys transport Wakasa's body on a cart, unknowingly passing Asura who somehow survived the fall. Some time later, the voice of the monk is heard talking about the beauty of life as Asura, now matured into an adult and a redeemed Buddhist monk, carves a wooden statue of Buddha. In a post-credit scene, the land is seen rich and fertile again with white doves flying above a city.

== Cast ==
- Masako Nozawa as Asura

An orphan who wanders the land eating whatever he can find, including humans. He was first found by a monk and later Wakasa where he was taken care of temporarily. He became infatuated with Wakasa due to her kindness.

- Megumi Hayashibara as Wakasa

A woman who resides in Jito's village. She saved Asura from death and took care of him. She originally planned to leave with Shichiro but was not able due to her own health and her father's.

- Kinya Kitaōji as Monk

A traveling monk who continuously preaches about Buddhism to Asura. At the end, it was indicated that he took Asura in and changes him.

- Tesshō Genda as Jitō

The village leader who chased Asura off a cliff. He is later killed when Asura ambushed him.

- Hiroaki Hirata as Shichiro

Wakasa's love interest; he convinced Wakasa to leave the village. Shichiro resorted to stealing food for Wakasa and was punished for it. He is seen carrying Wakasa's corpse to her burial place after she apparently died of starvation.

== Production ==
Director Keiichi Sato was influenced to send a life-affirming message to those who found themselves without the will to live following the events of the natural disasters that hit Japan in 2011.

This film was produced using Hybrid animation, a new technique Toei Animation developed mimicking "watercolors in motion". The characters are animated in CGI, while the backgrounds are painted in the traditional way.
