= The Crimson Thread of Abandon =

First edition

The Crimson Thread of Abandon is a collection of short fiction by Shūji Terayama, translated into English by Elizabeth L. Armstrong and published by the University of Hawai'i Press in 2013. The book contains a total of 20 stories. The stories in the first half of the book originate from the collection Stories Sewn Up with a Red Thread.

Robert Anthony Siegel wrote in Three Percent that the translation had a "graceful" approach to wordplay and puns, and that the translator did her task "with sensitivity and skill".

== Stories ==
The titular crimson thread describes the nature of the short stories and the lines that connect each story to one another via the common themes of unrequited love, abandonment, irremediable separation, and disappointment.

- "Ribbon of the Sea"
- "Bird in a Bottle"
- "Yesterday"
- "Memory Shot"
- "Gotta Dance"
- "The Eraser"
- "The Elusive Milena"
- "Remy's Quantum Realities"
- "One-Centimeter Journey"
- "Five Stories of Hide-and-Seek"
- "Alice in Shadowland"
- "Alice in Bookland"
- "Que Sera Sera"
- "24,000 Kisses"
- "The Thief's Tango"
- "Joker Joe"
- "Flame"
- "Hide-and-Not-Go-Seek"
- "Lena's Death"
- "Fallen Angel"
