= Akira Kubo =

Japanese actor (born 1936)

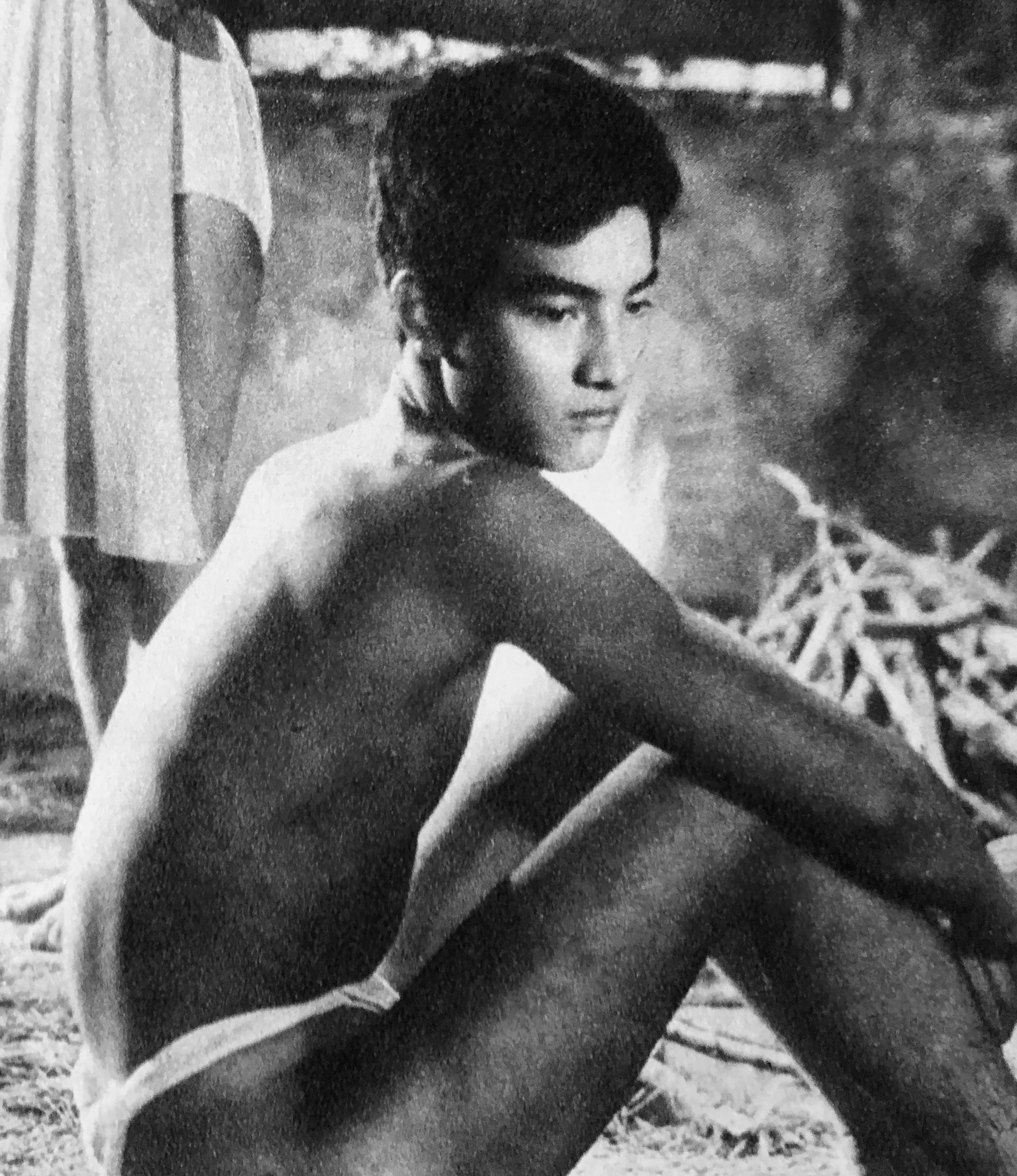
- Born: Yasunori Yamauchi; 1 December 1936 (age 89); Kōtō, Tokyo, Japan
- Occupation: Actor
- Years active: 1952–2019
- Relatives: Ken Yamauchi (younger brother)

Akira Kubo (久保 明, Kubo Akira; born Yasunori Yamauchi; December 1, 1936) is a Japanese actor who has appeared in over 70 films since 1952. He starred in the film Arashi, which was entered into the 7th Berlin International Film Festival.

== Filmography ==
- Arashi (1956) as Saburo Mizusawa
- Snow Country (1957)
- Throne of Blood (1957) as Miki Yoshiteru
- The Three Treasures (1959) as Prince Iogi
- Submarine I-57 Will Not Surrender (潜水艦イ-57降伏せず, Sensuikan I-57 kofuku sezu) (1959)
- Chushingura: Hana no Maki, Yuki no Maki (1962) as Lord Date
- Gorath (1962) as Cadet Astronaut Tatsuo Kanai
- Matango (1963) as Professor Kenji Murai
- Invasion of Astro-Monster (1965) as Tetsuo Torii
- Son of Godzilla (1967) as Goro Maki
- Destroy All Monsters (1968) as Katsuo Yamabe, Captain of the SY-3
- Kill! (1968) as Monnosuke Takei
- Battle of the Japan Sea (1969) as Kikuisami Matsui
- Space Amoeba (1970) as Taro Kudo
- Gamera: Guardian of the Universe (1995) as Captain of the Kairyu-Maru
- The Truth about Nanjing (2010) as Heitarō Kimura
- Seigi no Se (2018)
- The Great Buddha Arrival (2018) as Prime Minister Maki
- Henso Ningen (2020) as Unknown
