= Sword of the Beast =

- Cover of The Criterion Collection DVD
- Directed by: Hideo Gosha
- Written by: Hideo Gosha; Eizaburo Shiba
- Produced by: Gin'ichi Kishimoto; Masayuki Satô
- Starring: Mikijiro Hira; Go Kato
- Cinematography: Toshitada Tsuchiya
- Music by: Toshiaki Tsushima
- Distributed by: Shochiku
- Release date: September 18, 1965 (Japan)
- Running time: 85 minutes
- Country: Japan
- Language: Japanese

Sword of the Beast (Japanese: 獣の剣, Hepburn: Kedamono no ken; also called Samurai Gold Seekers) is a 1965 jidaigeki film co-written and directed by Hideo Gosha. Set in 1857 at the end of the Tokugawa Shogunate, the story follows a fugitive samurai who has killed a counselor in his clan and is on the run. He gets involved in a scheme to poach gold from the shōgun's mountain, where he encounters another samurai who is also there to poach gold.

== Plot ==
Gennosuke is a rebel samurai on the run, having fled his clan after assassinating a counselor. The daughter of the counselor, Misa, and her fiancé, Daizaburo, pursue Gennosuke along with other samurai from Gennosuke's clan despite Gennosuke's obvious superiority as a warrior. A series of flashbacks reveals that Gennosuke was manipulated into committing the treason by one of the clan's higher-ranking samurai, who led Gennosuke to believe that the counselor's death would result in modern reforms to the clan and in Gennosuke's promotion to a full-fledged retainer, instead of a lowly foot soldier. In fact, the ranking samurai simply wanted the counselor killed so that he could succeed to the position himself. He had used Gennosuke to do the "dirty work", and then abandoned Gennosuke to face the consequences of the crime.

As Gennosuke flees, he is given refuge by a poor farmer named Gundayu. Knowing that Gennosuke is a skilled swordsman, Gundayu makes the fugitive his partner in a scheme to poach gold from the shōgun's mountain. Doing so is dangerous, because of the presence of bandits and other poachers in the area, as well as the risk of being caught by the shōgun's authorities and sentenced to death.

On the mountain, Gennosuke discovers another samurai, Jurota Yamane and his wife Taka, who are stealing gold as part of a mission for their clan. It is eventually revealed that Jurota's clan is going to betray him and kill him and his wife after they have the gold. On hearing this Gennosuke is reminded of his own betrayal by the high-ranking men of his own clan. He decides to help Jurota and Taka instead of leaving the mountain for safety. Daizaburo and Misa catch up to Gennosuke as he is making this decision and follow him to the scene of the climactic battle.

Gennosuke finds Jurota and Taka, but too late to stop their murder by their own clan. Instead he takes revenge of the gathered clansmen and mercenaries. After the battle is won, Daizaburo and Misa see the hypocrisy of the clan system mirrored in Gennosuke's situation and rescind their vendetta allowing Gennosuke to leave without a fight.

== Cast ==
- Mikijiro Hira as Gennosuke
- Toshie Kimura as Misa
- Kantaro Suga as Daizaburo
- Takeshi Katō as Gundayu
- Go Kato as Jurota Yamane
- Shima Iwashita as Taka
- Yōko Mihara as Osen
- Shōbun Inoue as Araiwa
- Kunie Tanaka as Tanji
- Eijirō Tōno as Minister
