= Space Amoeba =

1970 Japanese kaiju film

- Japanese theatrical release poster

Japanese name
- Kanji: ゲゾラ・ガニメ・カメーバ 決戦! 南海の大怪獣
Transcriptions
- Revised Hepburn: Gezora, Ganime, Kamēba: Kessen! Nankai no Daikaijū
- Directed by: Ishirō Honda
- Screenplay by: Ei Ogawa
- Produced by: Tomoyuki Tanaka; Fumio Tanaka
- Starring: Akira Kubo; Atsuko Takahashi; Yukiko Kobayashi; Kenji Sahara
- Narrated by: Ichiro Murakoshi
- Cinematography: Taiichi Kankura
- Edited by: Masahisa Himi
- Music by: Akira Ifukube
- Production company: Toho
- Distributed by: Toho
- Release date: 1 August 1970 (Japan)
- Running time: 84 minutes
- Country: Japan
- Language: Japanese

Space Amoeba (ゲゾラ・ガニメ・カメーバ 決戦! 南海の大怪獣, Gezora, Ganime, Kamēba: Kessen! Nankai no Daikaijū; lit. 'Gezora, Ganimes, and Kamoebas: Decisive Battle! Giant Monsters of the South Seas') is a 1970 Japanese kaiju film directed by Ishirō Honda, written by Ei Ogawa, and produced by Tomoyuki Tanaka and Fumio Tanaka, with special effects by Sadamasa Arikawa. Produced and distributed by Toho, the film stars Akira Kubo, Atsuko Takahashi, Yukiko Kobayashi, Kenji Sahara, Yoshio Tsuchiya, and Yu Fujiki, with Haruo Nakajima portraying both Gezora and Ganimes and Haruyoshi Nakamura portraying Kamoebas.

Space Amoeba tells the story of an alien amoeba that hijacks a space probe and, after crash landing on an atoll in the Pacific Ocean, creates gigantic monsters from native lifeforms (a kisslip cuttlefish, elbow crab and mata mata) for the purpose of conquering the Earth. The film was released theatrically in Japan on 1 August 1970, and received a theatrical release in the United States in 1971 by American International Pictures, under the title Yog: Monster From Space. It was years later released on home video as Space Amoeba.

== Plot ==
The Helios 7 space probe is sent on a mission to study the planet Jupiter. While on its outward journey to the gas giant, the probe is overtaken by the Space Amoeba, an amorphous parasitic extraterrestrial.

The probe returns to Earth and crashes into the South Pacific, where the Space Amoeba leaves the device and inhabits the body of a cuttlefish, causing it to mutate into the tentacled giant monster called "Gezora". Gezora begins attacking ships and islands in the area.

A photographer named Taro Kudo and his entourage land on Selgio Island for a photoshoot, but their camp is attacked by Gezora. Because of its mutation, Gezora can create extremely cold temperatures with its body. When the survivors discover that Gezora is vulnerable to high temperatures, Kudo and his friends use gasoline from an old Japanese World War II ammunition depot to set fire to Gezora. Severely burned, Gezora retreats to the ocean before it dies from its injuries.

Exiting Gezora's lifeless body, the Space Amoeba possesses a stone crab, mutating it into Ganimes, and mounts a second attack on Selgio Island. Luckily, the humans manage to lure Ganimes into a pit and destroy it with explosives. The Amoeba survives a second time and flees into the island's jungle, plotting its revenge. The Space Amoeba decides to control three Earth creatures this time: Makoto Obata, a second Ganimes and a mata mata, which it mutates and enlarges into "Kamoebas". The two monsters raid the human camp. Luckily, Kudo realizes the two monsters' weakness: supersonic waves. By releasing a storm of bats, the Amoeba loses control of its creations.

Ganimes and Kamoebas, no longer under control, go berserk and begin to battle one another. The humans, using more explosives, cause the volcano to erupt, engulfing the two monsters and Obata, who sacrifices himself by jumping into the volcano to take the Space Amoeba with him.

== Cast ==
- Akira Kubo as Taro Kudo
- Atsuko Takahashi as Ayako Hoshino
- Yukiko Kobayashi as Saki
- Kenji Sahara as Makoto Obata
- Yoshio Tsuchiya as Dr. Kyouichi Miya
- Yu Fujiki as the promotion division manager
- Noritake Saito as Rico
- Yuko Sugihara as Stewardess
- Sachio Sakai as the magazine editor
- Chotaro Togin as Engineer Yokoyama
- Wataru Omae as Sakura
- Haruo Nakajima as Gezora and Ganimes
- Haruyoshi Nakamura as Kamoebas
- Ichiro Murakoshi as the voice of Space Amoeba and the narrator
- Tetsu Nakamura as supplicator Ombo

== Production ==
=== Writing ===
Ei Ogawa wrote the original script for this film in 1966 as a proposed joint production between Toho and UPA, under the title Great Monster Assault (怪獣大襲撃, Kaiju Daishūgeki). This script was considerably more ambitious than the finished product, featuring alien monsters invading the Earth and submerging entire continents. Production on the film did not begin until three years later in 1969, when the project first appeared on Toho's production lineup, still under its original title. Ogawa's script was heavily altered, removing the global scope of the original story and moving the setting entirely to the fictional South Seas island of Sergio Island. Producer Fumio Tanaka later said he believed the film went through three drafts, and stated that the original draft featured the alien invaders being attacked with nuclear weapons. Despite his failing health, Toho's longtime special effects director Eiji Tsuburaya expressed his desire to be involved with the production and as such was to be credited as the film's special effects supervisor, while his former pupil Sadamasa Arikawa acted as the director of special effects. However, Tsuburaya died just two days after the start of filming on January 25, 1970, and is only credited in early promotional materials for the film. Toho rejected a proposal by some staff members to dedicate the film to Eiji Tsuburaya. Arikawa was especially angered, refusing to talk about the film later in his life.

=== Filming ===
Gezora (Haruo Nakajima) comes ashore during filming.

The film's script was finalized in January, and shooting began that same month. Assistant director Seiji Tani remarked that Space Amoeba was burdened by constant pressure from the studio to minimize the budget, and that as a result the staff was forced to rush through filming. Ishiro Honda originally planned to shoot the film in Guam, but due to aforementioned budget restrictions shooting was relegated to Hachijo Island, located about 700 miles south of Tokyo. The film was shot in the middle of winter, even though the cast was dressed for a tropical location. Underwater scenes were shot in one of Toho's studio pools and Yomiuriland's Ryugu Palace. Producer Fumio Tanaka recalled that he had to personally transport the film negatives back to Tokyo on a prop plane. While Fumio Tanaka officially co-produced the film with Tomoyuki Tanaka, the latter was busy with Expo '70 at the time and as a result had very little to do with the production.

Space Amoeba was the last science-fiction film made under Toho's studio system. Facing declining profits, Toho took several steps to reduce the power of labor unions: establishing a subsidiary called Toho Eizo to specialize in tokusatsu films, releasing most of its actors from their contracts, and dissolving Tsuburaya's special effects department. It would also be Honda's last film under contract with Toho, although he returned in 1975 to direct Terror of Mechagodzilla.

== Release ==
Space Amoeba was released in Japan on 1 August 1970 where it was distributed by Toho. The film was released theatrically in the United States as Yog: Monster From Space in 1971. The film was distributed by American International Pictures with an English-language dub and had a running time of 81 minutes.

The film was released to home video in 2006 retitled Space Amoeba in its Japanese language with English subtitles.

== See also ==
- List of Japanese films of 1970
