= Kantarō Suga =

Japanese actor

Kantarō Suga 菅貫太郎
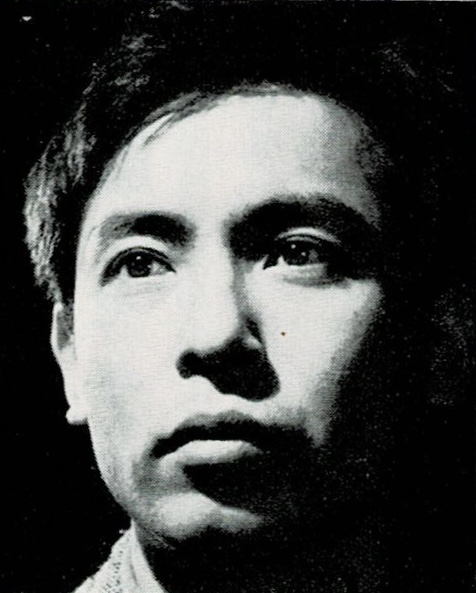
- Kantarō Suga in 1966
- Born: December 12, 1934; Yuzawa, Akita, Japan
- Died: March 22, 1994 (aged 59); Yokohama, Kanagawa, Japan
- Occupation: actor
- Years active: 1961–1994

Kantarō Suga (菅貫太郎, Suga Kantarō; born December 12, 1934, in Yuzawa, Akita - died March 22, 1994, in Yokohama) was a leading Japanese actor. His film credits span three decades, from 1960 to 1990. One of his prominent appearances was in the lead role in Pastoral: To Die in the Country. Suga also appeared in The Gate of Youth, Sword of the Beast, and Theater of Life. He also portrays Souichiro Akizuki- the father of Nobuhiko, Kyoko and also the foster father of the protagonist Kotaro Minami in the tokusatsu series Kamen Rider Black.

A frequent television guest star, Suga acted in jidaigeki and contemporary shows. Twenty appearances on Abarenbō Shōgun, thirteen on Zenigata Heiji, eleven on Momotarō-zamurai, nine on Ōoka Echizen, seven on Edo o Kiru, and numerous guest roles on various programs in the Mito Komon and Hissatsu series top his list of roles.

== Death ==
On the night of March 16, 1994, while returning home in Aso Ward, Kawasaki City, Kanagawa Prefecture, he was struck by a motorcycle at a pedestrian crossing in front of his residence and sustained a severe head injury. He was taken to Yokohama New Urban Neurosurgery Hospital in Midori Ward, Yokohama City, where he died on March 22 from a brain contusion at the age of 59.

A private burial was held on March 23, and news of his death was reported in newspapers on March 24 and widely covered on March 25. A public funeral and farewell ceremony took place on April 10 at the Yamaguchidai Kaikan in Kawasaki City, with Masao Sato, director of the Toei Kyoto Studio, serving as funeral chairperson.

== Filmography ==
=== Film ===
- Knightly Advice (1962)
- Jûsan-nin no shikaku (1963) - Naritsugu
- Ankokugai Main Street (1964) - Katsuo Nakata
- Sword of the Beast (1965) - Daizaburo
- Gohiki no shinshi (1966)
- Eleven Samurai (1967) - Lord Nariatsu
- Confessions Among Actresses (1971) - Dr. Hata
- Mushukunin mikogami no jôkichi: Kawakaze ni kako wa nagareta (1972)
- Mushukunin Mikogami no Jôkichi: Kiba wa hikisaita (1972)
- Onsen suppon geisha (1972) - Kurajirô Hattori
- Sukeban: Tamatsuki asobi (1974) - Koike
- Pastoral: To Die in the Country (1974) - Me
- Ôoku ukiyo-buro (1977)
- Piranha-gundan: Daboshatsu no ten (1977) - Keiji Sasamoto
- Tarao Bannai: Kimen mura no sangeki (1978) - Kazuomi Ebata
- The Yagyu Conspiracy (1978) - Matsudaira Tadanao
- The Gate of Youth (1981) - Ichimura
- Tsumiki kuzushi (1983) - Teacher
- Theater of Life (1983) - Mr. Kurōma
- Renzoku satsujinki: Reiketsu (1984) - Takafumi Tatsuta
- Hakujitsumu 2 (1987) - Doctor
- Shinran: Path to Purity (1987) - Zennen
- Hanazono no meikyu (1998)
- Shaso (1989) - Hiroto, Fukamachi
- Gokudo no onna-tachi: Saigo no tatakai (1990) - Lawyer Sakurai
- Kyokutô kuroshakai (1993)

=== Television ===
- Shinsho Taikōki (1973) - Ashikaga Yoshiaki
- Shadow Warriors (1980)
- Ōoku (1983)
- Kawaite sōrō (1984)
- Kamen Rider Black (1987, episode 1) - Souichiro Akizuki
- Mito Komon (1989, episode 18) - Ichijyo Sanyi
- The Unfettered Shogun (1989) Season 3 Episode 64 "Snow Princess Fight" (1989) - Genbu Sakurai
