= Yukiko Kobayashi =

Japanese actress (born 1946)

- Born: 6 October 1946 (age 79); Tokyo, Japan
- Occupation: Actress
- Years active: 1965-1974

Yukiko Kobayashi (小林夕岐子, Kobayashi Yukiko; born 6 October 1946) is a former Japanese actress. She has appeared in more than ten films since 1965.

== Filmography ==
Film
Year	Title	Role	Notes
1966	Oyome ni oide		
1967	Aru koroshi ya		
1968	Destroy All Monsters	Kyoko Manabe	
1969	Nyu jirando no wakadaishô	Stewardess	
1969	Konto 55go: Jinrui no daijakuten		
1969	Mito Kômon man'yûki	Actress 2	
1970	Nippon ichi no yakuza otoko		
1970	The Vampire Doll	Yûko Nonomura – Kazuhiko's Fiancé	
1970	Space Amoeba	Saki, native girl	
1971	Wakadaishô tai Aodaishô		
1971	Throw Away Your Books, Rally in the Streets	Sister	
1974	Kamen Rider X: Five Rider vs King Dark	Julie Chan	
1974	Jumborg Ace & Giant	Anan	
2018	The Great Buddha Arrival	Yuko Murata	
