= Eleven Samurai =

Eleven Samurai Ju-ichinin no Samurai
- Theatrical release poster
- Directed by: Eiichi Kudo
- Screenplay by: Takeo Kunihiro; Noribumi Suzuki; Kei Tasaka
- Produced by: Shigeru Okada
- Starring: Isao Natsuyagi; Kōtarō Satomi; Kōji Nanbara; Junko Miyazono; Kantarō Suga; Kō Nishimura; Ryūtarō Ōtomo
- Cinematography: Sadaji Yoshida
- Edited by: Tadao Kanda
- Music by: Akira Ifukube
- Production company: Toei Company
- Distributed by: Toei Company
- Release date: 16 December 1967 (Japan)
- Running time: 95 minutes
- Country: Japan
- Language: Japanese

Eleven Samurai (Japanese: 十一人の侍, romaji: Jūichinin no Samurai), also known as 11 Samurai, is a 1967 Japanese jidaigeki (period drama) film directed by Eiichi Kudo. This is the third and final chapter in Kudo's Samurai Revolution trilogy. The plot is a samurai epic with a loose historical basis. "The young Lord Nariatsu was probably modeled after the real life figure of Matsudaira Nariyoshi, also known as Matsudaira Tokunosuke (1819-1839)," who was the 19th or the 20th son of the Shōgun Ienari (1787–1837) and the younger brother of the Shōgun Ieyoshi (1837–1853). "Nariyoshi died when he was 19 years old--a perfect fit for this story. The circumstances surrounding his death are obscure, which is also very convenient for dramatic purposes."

== Plot ==
This black and white film is set in November 1839, during the final decades of Japan's Tokugawa shogunate. The retired Shōgun's youngest son, Lord Nariatsu, crosses into the neighboring Oshi fief while he's hunting. Confronted by the Clan Lord Abe Masayori for just killing one of his vassals, Nariatsu kills him in a fit of pique. The Oshi fief retainers appeal to the Shōgun's Council of Elders for justice. Not wishing to embarrass the Shōgun's Tokugawa Clan, Chief Secretary Mizumo rewrites the event. He places Clan Lord Abe in the wrong and Lord Nariatsu defending himself. For this "attack," the Oshi fief is to be abolished at the end of the month, and the income from the lands given to Lord Nariatsu as compensation.

Angered by this gross injustice, Chief Retainer (Chamberlain) Tatewaki approaches childhood friend, Sengoku Hayato, and asks him to avenge their Lord's murder. Hayato agrees to assemble a small band of loyal samurai. Hayato and nine Oshi fief samurai vow to trade their lives for justice. They follow Nariatsu to Edo (feudal Tokyo) where they are joined by Ido Daijuro, a rōnin (wandering samurai) with a thirst for revenge against lords after tragic injustice to his family.

Hayato and his ten followers plan to ambush Nariatsu with his large escort as he travels from the brothels of Edo to the safety of his castle in the Tatebayashi fief. As they are about to attack, Hayato receives a letter from Tatewaki ordering him not to kill Nariatsu, because Councilor Mizumo has told him that the council is likely to reverse the decision to abolish the Oshi fief. While some samurai initially refuse to obey, Hayato enforces the order because obedience is a samurai's first duty. Later, Daijuro tells the others that Hayato has more reason to disobey than they do. His wife, Lady Orie, has already committed jigai in anticipation of Nariatsu's death and the retired Shōgun's wrath.

When Tatewaki discovers that Councilor Mizumo lied, he rides to Hayato and orders him to kill Nariatsu. Ashamed that he was duped, Tatewaki commits seppuku. The eleven samurai establich a stonghold in a small village to catch Nariatsu and his bodyguards in the town at the river crossing to his fief, where Nariatsu has tarried due to a rainstorm. In a great battle against the 50 elite bodyguards, Hayato eventually hunts down kills Nariatsu. Afterwards, few except Hayato and Gyobu are still standing. Daijuro appears—he has dispatched the last of the bodyguards. Daijuro cuts off the already dead Nariatsu's head and walks away, happy in his vengeance. When the rumors of the kataki-uchi (vendetta) spread, the Oshi fief is restored to the Abe clan. And, the council of elders releases a statement that the retired Shōgun's youngest son has died of an illness.

== Cast ==
(Character names follow the pattern of Japanese names, with the family surname placed first)

- Deputy Chief Retainer Sengoku Hayato (Isao Natsuyagi) – The leader of the eleven samurai. Tatewaki's childhood friend and the Captain of the Oshi fief's cavalry.
- Mitamura Kenshiro (Kōtarō Satomi) – Hayato's right-hand man. Leader of an unsuccessful assassination attempt on Lord Nariatsu's life.
- Chief Retainer Tatewaki (Kōji Nanbara) – The chamberlain of the Oshi fief and the leader of the Abe clan samurai.
- Lady Orie (Junko Miyazono) – Hayato's faithful wife.
- Lady Nui (Eiko Okawa) – The sister of one of the original samurai, who died of tuberculosis. She offered her sword in her brother's place, so her family wouldn't be dishonored by the brother's unfulfilled vow.
- Secretary Mizumo Echizen (Kei Satō) – The head of the Shōgun's Council of Elders. A corrupt statesman who is concerned about appearances and his own position.
- Lord Matsudaira Nariatsu (Kantarō Suga) – A spoiled and arrogant aristocrat. The retired Shōgun's youngest and most favored son.
- Chief Retainer Akiyoshi Gyobu (Ryūtarō Ōtomo) – Lord Nariatsu's chamberlain of the Tatebayashi fief and the leader of his samurai. A samurai skilled in swordplay and strategy. The retired Inspector General of Japan.
- Ido Daijuro (Kō Nishimura) – A young, disillusioned rōnin, who thirsts to avenge his sister, father, and older brother.

== Reception ==
On the review aggregator website Rotten Tomatoes, Eleven Samurai has an aggregate score of 71%.

The Samurai Revolution trilogy follows the "commercial formula along the lines of the traditional Chūshingura / 47 Rōnin story, especially the third film, 11 Samurai, about a violent vendetta in the midst of existential uncertainty."

== Home media ==
The film was released on DVD in the United States on 6 November 2012 by Animeigo.
