= Zeni Geba =

Japanese manga series

- Cover of the first bunkoban volume

銭ゲバ
- Manga
- Written by: George Akiyama
- Published by: Shogakukan; Asahi Sonorama
- Imprint: Shōnen Sunday Comics
- Magazine: Weekly Shōnen Sunday
- Original run: 1970 – 1971
- Volumes: 2
- Television drama
- Written by: Yoshikazu Okada
- Original network: NNN
- Original run: 17 January 2009 – 14 March 2009
- Episodes: 9

Zeni Geba (銭ゲバ) is a Japanese manga series written and illustrated by George Akiyama.

== Publication ==
The series was originally serialized in Shogakukan's shōnen manga magazine Weekly Shōnen Sunday from 1970 to 1971, with its chapters collected into two tankōbon volumes. Shōnen Sunday was once specified as "harmful" in some prefectures when the series has started, because of its violent and drastic depiction.

== Plot ==
The story was about a boy named Fūtarō Gamagōri (蒲郡風太郎) who lived in extreme poverty, who gained affluence and influence through a series of murders.
Zeni means money in Japanese and Geba means die Gewalt (power) in German, so the title can be translated into "Moneypower".

== Characters ==
Fūtarō Gamagōri (蒲郡風太郎, Gamagōri Fūtarō)
The main protagonist of the story. Originally from Matsumoto City (松本市, Matsumoto-shi), Nagano Prefecture (長野県, Nagano-ken). He has a disfiguring scar over his left eye. Once short and skinny, he becomes somewhat overweight after murdering Mieko (三枝子, Mieko). He has prominent canine teeth and often ends sentences with the phrase “~zura (〜ズラ, ~zura).” Raised by an alcoholic, womanizing father and a chronically ill mother, he endured a poverty-stricken childhood. His grotesque appearance earned him scorn and mockery, with few positive memories—except for his kind mother, whose death due to lack of money convinced him that "money is everything" and "if it’s for money, I’ll do anything." This mindset transformed him into a true money-grubber (Zenigeba (銭ゲバ, Zenigeba)).

After his mother’s death, he killed a local young man who tried to stop him from stealing and fled to Tokyo. There, he deliberately collided with the car of the president of Taishō Trading Company (大昭物産, Taishō Bussan), murdered the driver Shinboshi (新星, Shinboshi), and took his place as a live-in chauffeur. On the night of his wedding to Masami (正美, Masami), the president’s younger daughter, he murdered the president and raped Mieko, setting fire to the mansion and seizing control of the company. He later drove Masami to suicide and committed numerous murders. Encouraged by the politician Seikō Jin (神清行, Jin Seikō), he ran for governor and was elected. However, when asked to write an essay on “human happiness” by a newspaper, he began to write from his usual viewpoint—"money brings happiness"—but unconsciously envisioned a humble, loving family life money couldn’t buy. In this fantasy, he was happily married to Mieko with children. Realizing the truth he'd denied, he impulsively shot himself with a pistol hidden in his desk, ending the story on a bleak yet powerful note. In the side story, Zenigeba no Musume Pūko (銭ゲバの娘 プーコ, Zenigeba no Musume Pūko), it's revealed that he survived the suicide attempt.

His catchphrase “zura (ズラ, zura)” comes from regional dialects in the Chūbu region (中部地方, Chūbu chihō), specifically from Shizuoka (静岡県, Shizuoka), Yamanashi (山梨県, Yamanashi), and Nagano (長野県, Nagano). Though it generally indicates conjecture or confirmation (like “probably” or “right?”), its use as in “I’ll do anything for money, zura” is grammatically incorrect. Today, “zura” is nearly obsolete, having been replaced by “dara” and rarely used by younger generations.

Mieko (三枝子, Mieko)
The beautiful eldest daughter of the president of Taishō Trading. She was Fūtarō’s ideal woman. Raised in a wealthy household, she carried herself with a proud, refined demeanor. She came to trust Fūtarō after he saved her from an attacker and was diligent in her work. However, on the night of her sister’s wedding, Fūtarō murdered her father and raped her, setting their home ablaze. Though presumed dead, she survived and reappeared with Fūtarō’s child. Living with him without love, she eventually grew to hate him. After Fūtarō murdered their child and tried to kill her too, she attempted to flee but was stabbed to death.

In Fūtarō’s fantasy, she was his wife, and they raised a happy family.

Corresponds to the character “Midori Mikuni (三國緑, Mikuni Midori)” in the drama adaptation.

== Adaptations ==
A film of Zeni Geba was released in 1970, directed by Yoshinori Wada, starring Jūrō Kara and Mako Midori, and featuring an appearance by science fiction author Izumi Suzuki.

== Television Drama ==
The series was dramatized into a TV series in 2009, and was aired from January to March by the NNN TVs in Japan, starring Kenichi Matsuyama. The original story was released shortly after when Student activism was on in Japan and thus reflected such historical backgrounds as represented in its use of the word ゲバ (geba) in the title. The background of the TV series, on the other hand, was adjusted to reflect the 2009 world, including positioning of the main character as a temp worker (派遣社員, haken shain) working at a factory.

Zeni Geba
- Genre: Television drama
- Written by: Yoshikazu Okada
- Starring: Kenichi Matsuyama, Rie Mimura, Daisuke Miyagawa, Haruka Kinami, Anna Ishibashi, Hiroki Suzuki, Seiko Takuma, Shiho, Ryusei Saito, Kei Yamamoto, Kaoru Okunuki, Ken Mitsuishi, Ryo, Kippei Shiina
- Ending theme: "Sayonara" by Kariyushi58
- Country of origin: Japan

Production
- Production company: Nippon TV

Original release
- Network: Nippon TV

=== Overview ===
The drama follows the basic plot of George Akiyama's manga but adapts it to a contemporary 2009 setting, reflecting issues such as the post-Lehman economic crisis and employment instability. Most characters are original to the drama, excluding Fūtarō and Kenzō. Fūtarō’s scar is due to child abuse, unlike the congenital scar in the manga. The final episode shows an alternate "happy" life, ending in a dramatic suicide by dynamite. The line between dream, hallucination, and reality is left ambiguous.

Catchphrase: 「金のためなら何でもするずら」 ("I'll do anything for money, zura.")

=== Broadcast Dates, Titles, and Ratings ===
Episode	Air Date	Original Japanese Title (日本語副題)	English Subtitle	Viewership Rating
Episode 1	January 17, 2009	愛をください…金のためなら何でもするズラ!!	Please Give Me Love… I’ll Do Anything for Money!!	12.0%
Episode 2	January 24, 2009	愛は金で買えるズラ!!!!	Love Can Be Bought with Money!!!!	11.3%
Episode 3	January 31, 2009	罠! 美しい心が欲しいズラ	A Trap! I Want a Beautiful Heart	9.0%
Episode 4	February 7, 2009	僕の家族は母さんだけズラ	My Only Family Is My Mom	10.7%
Episode 5	February 14, 2009	友情も愛も必要ないズラ…	I Don’t Need Friendship or Love…	10.1%
Episode 6	February 21, 2009	逮捕…金が招いた不幸ズラ	Arrested… Misery Brought by Money	10.2%
Episode 7	February 28, 2009	命の値段も結局金ズラか…	Is Life's Value Just Money After All…?	8.7%
Episode 8	March 7, 2009	悪は静かに死んでやるズラ	Evil Will Die Quietly	6.4%
Final Episode	March 14, 2009	幸せはどこにあるズラ?	Where Can Happiness Be Found?	10.5%
Average viewership rating: 9.9% (Viewership ratings are based on data from the Kanto region of Japan, as surveyed by Video Research.)

=== Cast ===
Fūtarō Gamagōri (蒲郡風太郎) (Age 23)
Portrayed by Kenichi Matsuyama. A temporary worker who starts at Kamata Plywood Factory, later joining Mikuni Shipbuilding. Although he appears quiet and unassuming, he is ruthless when it comes to money. He manipulates his way into the Mikuni family, committing multiple murders, including that of his own father, and eventually dies in a fiery explosion. His catchphrase is "zura" (a regional speech quirk).

Young Fūtarō (蒲郡風太郎（少年時代）) (Age 11)
Portrayed by Ryusei Saito. Suffers extreme poverty in childhood. Bullied and starved, his mother dies young and his father is abusive. These experiences forge his belief that "money is everything" and harden his heart.

Midori Mikuni (緑三國) (Age 24)
Portrayed by Rie Mimura. Eldest daughter of the Mikuni family. Kind-hearted, she once met Fūtarō as a child. Reunited as adults, she becomes a superior to him at the company. Despite his manipulations, she forgives him, but is eventually left devastated by his death.

Yuka Mikuni (ユカ三國) (Age 20)
Portrayed by Haruka Kinami. The spoiled and temperamental second daughter of the Mikuni family. Addicted to hosting club parties, she tries to seduce Fūtarō and is ultimately strangled to death by him when she threatens to expose him.

Mika Mikuni (ミカ三國) (Age 15)
Portrayed by Anna Ishibashi. The youngest Mikuni daughter. Quiet and withdrawn, she is the only sibling to become truly attached to Fūtarō, even calling him "big brother." She loses her memory after witnessing a murder.

Kenzō Mikuni (三國謙三) (Age 68)
Portrayed by Kippei Shiina. Patriarch of the Mikuni family and president of Mikuni Shipbuilding. Cold-hearted and greedy, he recognizes his younger self in Fūtarō. He initially tries to eliminate him, but eventually dies of a heart attack during a business collapse.

Hoshino (星野)
Portrayed by Daisuke Miyagawa. Fūtarō’s shady co-worker and friend who helps him scam and steal. Eventually disappears after being caught.

Sayaka (サヤカ)
Portrayed by Shiho. A prostitute and single mother Fūtarō targets for money. Though she seems cold, she tries to protect her daughter from his schemes.

Jun (ジュン)
Portrayed by Hiroki Suzuki. Sayaka’s lover who is tricked by Fūtarō and beaten near to death. He returns later with revenge.

Kaoru (カオル)
Portrayed by Seiko Takuma. An aggressive and flashy woman working with Hoshino. Tries to seduce Fūtarō but is eventually abandoned.

Yoshiko Gamagōri (蒲郡よし子)
Portrayed by Kaoru Okunuki. Fūtarō’s mother. A kind but sickly woman who dies early in the story from illness and malnutrition.

Fūtarō’s Father (蒲郡の父)
Portrayed by Ken Mitsuishi. An alcoholic and abusive man who blames Fūtarō for his wife’s death. Fūtarō eventually kills him.

Narrator (ナレーション)
Voiced by Ryo. Provides commentary on the events, especially from Midori’s perspective.

=== Staff ===
- Original work: George Akiyama – *Zenigeba*
- Screenwriter: Yoshikazu Okada
- Directors: Nobuo Mizuta, Tetsuo Shinohara, Hitoshi Iwamoto
- Music: Yugo Kanno
- Theme song: Kariyushi58 – "Sayonara"
- Narration: Kozo Shioya
- Producer: Noriko Sugimoto (AXON)
- Chief Producer: Yoshiki Tanaka
- Production cooperation: AXON
- Production: Nippon Television Network Corporation
