= Arashi (film) =

1956 Japanese film

- Directed by: Hiroshi Inagaki
- Written by: Ryūzō Kikushima; Tōson Shimazaki
- Produced by: Hiroshi Inagaki
- Starring: Chishū Ryū
- Cinematography: Tadashi Iimura
- Edited by: Hideshi Ohi
- Production company: Toho
- Release date: 24 October 1956
- Running time: 108 minutes
- Country: Japan
- Language: Japanese

Arashi (嵐; Storm) is a 1956 Japanese film directed by Hiroshi Inagaki and starring Chishū Ryū. It was written by Ryūzō Kikushima and Tōson Shimazaki. It was entered into the 7th Berlin International Film Festival.

== Cast ==
- Chishū Ryū as Shinji Mizusawa
- Kinuyo Tanaka as Otoku, housekeeper
- Daisuke Katō as Ishii
- Akira Kubo as Saburo Mizusawa
- Izumi Yukimura as Sueko Mizusawa
- Ren Yamamoto as Taro Mizusawa
- Kunio Otsuka as Jiro Mizusawa
- Gen Shimizu as Kitagawa
- Chieko Nakakita as Osaki, maidservant
- Haruko Togo as Shizue
- Minosuke Yamada as Shinji's brother
- Ren Imaizumi as Miyaguchi
- Fumito Matsuo as Mori
- Akira Tani as Hirotaka
- Yoshio Inaba as Detective of the special political police
