= The Great Buddha Arrival (1934 film) =

The Great Buddha Arrival: Chukyo Edition
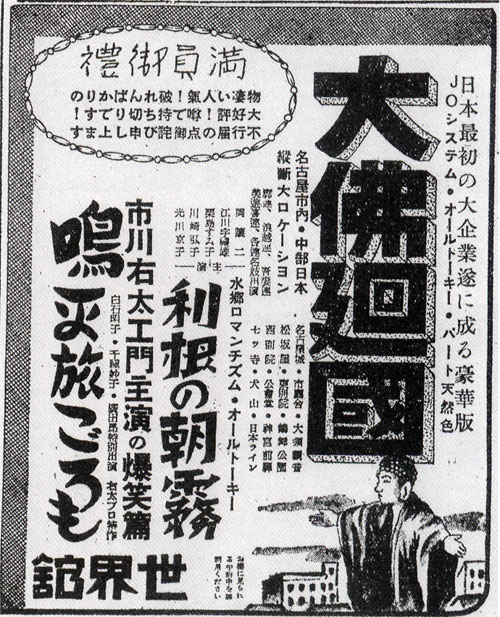
- 1934 promotional flyer for the release of The Great Buddha Arrival: Chukyo Edition
- Directed by: Yoshiro Edamasa
- Produced by: Yoshiro Edamasa
- Starring: Hidemichi Ishikawa; Kazuyo Kojima; Tankai Soganoya
- Cinematography: Haruzo Ando; Harumi Machii
- Production company: Giant Buddha Movie Factory
- Release date: September 14, 1934
- Running time: 75 minutes
- Country: Japan

The Great Buddha Arrival (大佛廻國, Daibutsu Kaikoku), also known as The Great Buddha Arrival: Chukyo Edition (大佛廻國・中京編, Daibutsu Kaikoku Chūkyōhen), is a lost 1934 independently made Japanese black-and-white kaiju film directed by Yoshiro Edamasa.

== Plot ==
The Great Buddha of Shurakuen in Ueno Village, Aichi Prefecture (currently Tokai City) opens its eyes and tours Nagoya City. After journeying through Hell, the Great Buddha rides in the clouds and heads for Tokyo.

== Cast ==
- Hidemichi Ishikawa
- Tankai Soganoya
- Kazuyo Kojima

== Remake ==
In 2018, 3Y Film produced a film directed by Hiroto Yokokawa with a budget of ¥3 million.

== Legacy ==
Bin Furuya noted that The Great Buddha Arrival inspired various tokusatsu productions most notably the Ultraman franchise.
