= George Akiyama =

Japanese manga artist (1943–2020)

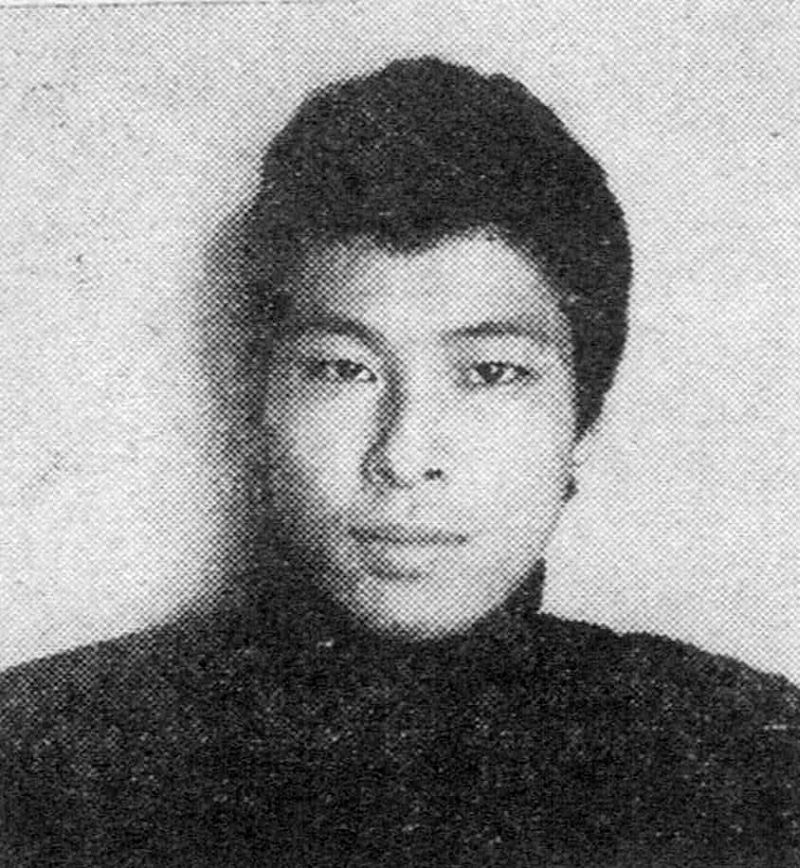
- Born: Yūji Akiyama; April 27, 1943; Ashikaga, Tochigi, Japan
- Died: May 12, 2020 (aged 77)
- Occupation: Manga artist
- Known for: Zeni Geba (1970–1971); Haguregumo (1973–2017)
- Website: www.george-akiyama.com

Yūji Akiyama (Japanese: 秋山 勇二, Hepburn: Akiyama Yūji; April 27, 1943 – May 12, 2020), better known as George Akiyama (ジョージ秋山, Jōji Akiyama), was a Japanese manga artist known for dealing with controversial and incendiary topics in many of his works. He was born the second boy of five siblings. He had an older brother and older sister, as well as a younger brother and younger sister. His father was Korean and an artificial flower craftsman.

== Biography ==
Akiyama quit high school and moved to Tokyo to become a manga artist. After working briefly as a book wholesaler, he became an assistant for manga artist Kenji Morita. He made his major debut in 1966 with the gag-manga Gaikotsu-kun, which was published in Bekkan Shōnen Magazine, and shocked readers in 1970 with Asura, which contained numerous unsettling depictions of human life. The first chapter of Asura contains a scene where a woman commits cannibalism to prevent herself from dying of starvation, and later attempts to eat her own child as well. The August 2, 1970, edition of Weekly Shōnen Magazine, which first published this chapter, was banned in several regions as a result of this scene, propelling Akiyama to infamy within the manga industry. Asura was adapted into an anime film by Toei Animation in 2012.

Akiyama continued his career with Kokuhaku (lit. 'Confessions'), which began serialization in the 11th edition of Weekly Shōnen Sunday in 1971. This manga took on an unprecedented format where Akiyama would make a confession each week (for instance, in one chapter he confesses that he is a murderer), only to admit that his confession was a lie in the following week's chapter. After repeating this for the duration of the manga, Akiyama suddenly announced his retirement, cutting off all of the serializations he held on various magazines to embark on a solo journey across Japan.

Akiyama came out of retirement only three months later with Bara no Sakamichi, which began serialization in the 34th edition of Weekly Shōnen Jump in 1971. He started his longest work, Haguregumo, on Big Comic Original, which won him the Shogakukan Manga Award in 1979. The series ended in 2017, and spanned 112 volumes since its inception in 1973. The series was also adapted into an anime film by Toei Animation and Madhouse in 1982.

Akiyama died on May 12, 2020, at the age of 77 of unspecified causes.

== Notable works ==
Title	Year	Collected
Patman X (パットマンX, Pattoman X)	1967–1968	5 tankōbon, Weekly Shōnen Magazine, Kodansha; Recipient of the Kodansha Jidō Manga Award.
Derorinman (デロリンマン)	1969–1970	2 tankōbon, Weekly Shōnen Jump, Shueisha; The volumes were titled Ganso Derorinman (元祖デロリンマン) because they were released after the 1975 remake.
Braggart Dondon (ほらふきドンドン, Horafuki Dondon)	1969–1970	5 tankōbon, Weekly Shōnen Magazine, Kodansha
Ashura (アシュラ)	1970–1971	3 tankōbon, Weekly Shōnen Magazine, Kodansha
Zeni Geba (銭ゲバ)	1970–1971	5 tankōbon, Weekly Shōnen Sunday, Shogakukan
Kokuhaku (告白)	1971	1 tankōbon, Weekly Shōnen Sunday, Shogakukan
Bara no Sakamichi (ばらの坂道)	1971–1972	3 tankōbon, Weekly Shōnen Jump, Shueisha
The Moon (ザ・ムーン)	1972–1973	4 tankōbon, Weekly Shōnen Sunday, Shogakukan
Haguregumo (浮浪雲)	1973–2017	112 tankōbon, Big Comic Original, Shogakukan
Hana no Yotarō	1974–1979	15 tankōbon, Weekly Shōnen Champion
Derorinman	1975–1976	3 tankōbon, Weekly Shōnen Magazine, Kodansha; Remake of the 1969 manga, which differs significantly from the original version.
Bonkura Dōshin	1976–1977	4 tankōbon, Weekly Shōnen Magazine, Kodansha
Gyara	1979–1981	8 tankōbon, Shōnen King
Pink no Curtain (ピンクのカーテン)	1980–1984	Part 1: 15 tankōbon, Part 2: 6 tankōbon, Weekly Manga Goraku
Chōjin Haruko	1982–1984	3 tankōbon, Weekly Morning
Kaijin Gonzui	1984	1 tankōbon, Weekly Shōnen Jump
Koiko no Mainichi	1985–1992	32 tankōbon, Weekly Manga Action
Kudoki-ya Joe	1986–1987	4 tankōbon, Big Comic Superior
Lovelin Monroe	1989–1993	13 tankōbon, Young Magazine
Onnagata Kisaburō	1993–2002	7 tankōbon, Big Comic Original Sōkan
Hakuai no Hito	1993–1996	8 tankōbon, Big Gold
Dobugero-sama	1995–1996	1 tankōbon, Monthly Shōnen Gangan
Sutegataki Hitobito	1996–1999	5 tankōbon, Big Gold
Ikinasai Kiki	2001–2002	4 tankōbon
Who Are You	2002	1 tankōbon, Big Comic Original Sōkan; Author listed as Yūji Akiyama during serialization.
Manga Chūgoku Nyūmon: Yakkai na Rinjin no Kenkyū	2005	Published by Asukashinsha.
