= Yoshirō Edamasa =

Japanese film director

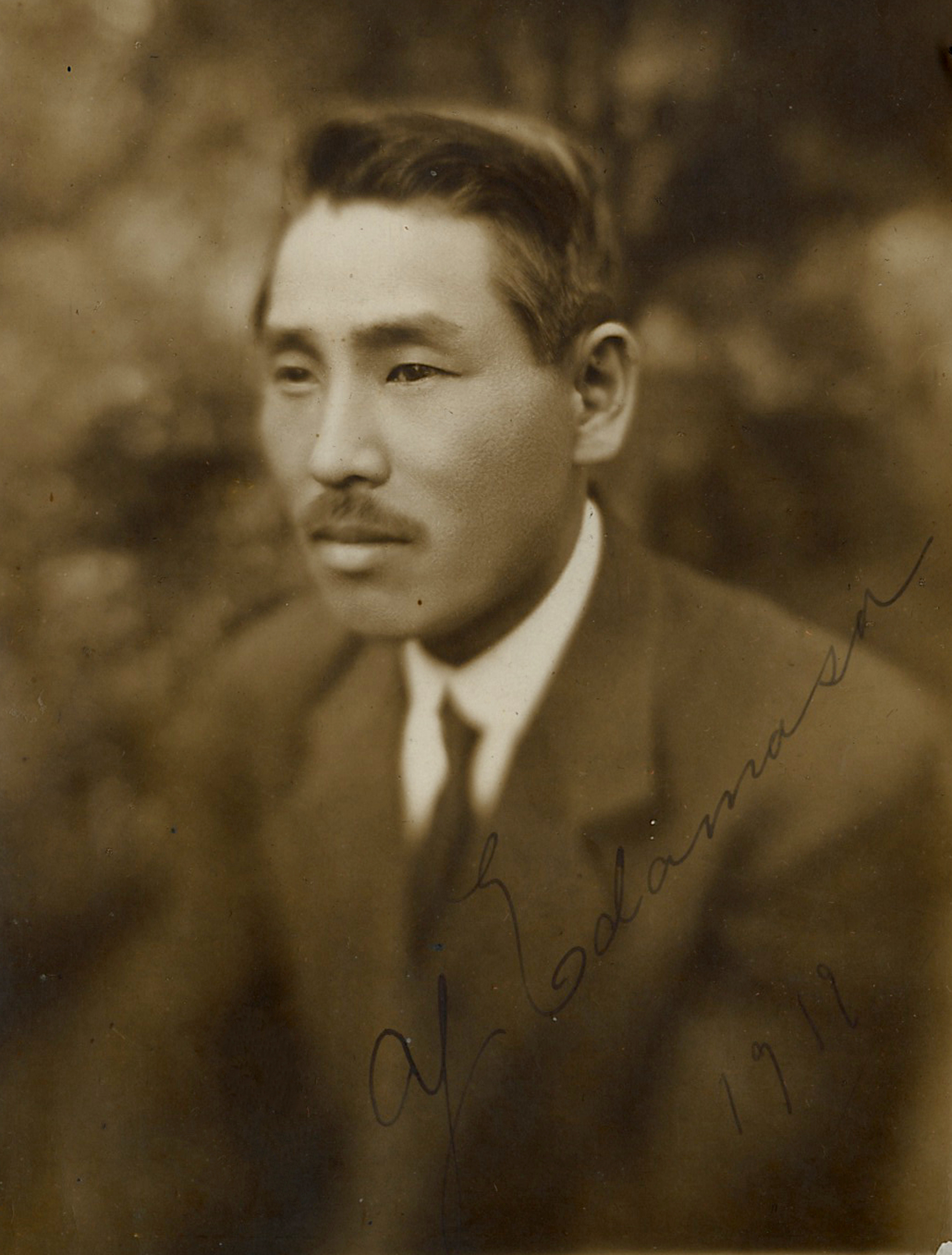
- Edamasa in 1919
- Born: 22 September 1888; Hiroshima, Empire of Japan
- Died: 8 September 1944 (aged 55)
- Occupation: Film director
- Years active: 1914-1934

Yoshirō Edamasa (枝正 義郎, Edamasa Yoshirō; 22 September 1888 – 8 September 1944) was a Japanese film director best known for Sakamoto Ryoma (1928) and The Great Buddha Arrival (1934). The latter film is one of the earliest tokusatsu movies, which is exemplified by kaiju movies. He was an early pioneer of Japanese cinema who trained many outstanding directors and cinematographers including Eiji Tsuburaya.

== Life ==
Edamasa was born in Kushima, Saeki, Hiroshima Prefecture (present-day Hatsukaichi, Hiroshima).

In 1910, he began working in the film industry when he was hired by Yoshizawa Shōten. He later worked as an operator also for Fukuhōdō, Tōyō Shōkai and Tenkatsu Nippori.

He made his debut as a director in 1919 on the film Ai no kyoku which was considered to be one of the most advanced films of that time. By the end of the 1930s, Edamasa had directed more than 20 films.

Edamasa belonged to a group of directors who emphasized the realistic style of acting.

== Selected filmography ==
- Yoshitsune sembon zakura (1914) - Cinematographer
- Ninjutsu kaiso Koga Saburou (1918) - Cinematographer
- Momochi sandayu (1918) - Cinematographer
- Ai no kyoku (1919) - Director and Cinematographer
- Awaremi no kyoku (1919) - Director
- Shima no tsuka (1920) - Director
- Korokuden (1924) - Director
- Fuyuki shinju (1924) - Director
- Sakamoto Ryoma (1928) - Director
- Tsukigata hanpeita (1929) - Director
- Higo no komageta (1929) - Director
- kōboro kakū no kyōjin (1932) - Director
- The Great Buddha Arrival (1934) - Director (Last work)
