= Image Forum Festival =

- Location: Tokyo, Kyoto and Yokohama, Japan
- Founded: 1987
- Language: International
- Website: http://imageforumfestival.com/bosyu2016/ (in Japanese)

Image Forum Festival is Japan's largest art film festival, and the largest dedicated to the screening of new experimental films, both in Japan and around the world. It began in 1987 in Tokyo, and includes space for video installations and live performance. It is now held in Tokyo, Kyoto and Yokohama annually, and often includes other cities across Japan. As well as featuring modern domestic and international films, it includes a selection of historical masterpieces.

The festival is run by Image Forum, a school and cinemathéque that preserves and promotes the production of experimental film, and fosters the next generation of filmmakers. Its affiliate company, Dagurreo Press, Inc. publishes books on filmmaking and video software.

== Awards ==
Image Forum won the 1988 Japan Movie Pen Club Award.
