= Emperor Tomato Ketchup (film) =

Japanese experimental film

- Film poster for 1996 re-release
- Kanji: トマトケチャップ皇帝
- Revised Hepburn: Tomato Kechappu Kōtei
- Directed by: Shūji Terayama
- Written by: Shūji Terayama
- Produced by: Art Theatre Guild
- Starring: Keiko Niitaka (新高恵子); Salvador Tari (サルバドール・タリ)
- Distributed by: Daguerreo Press
- Release dates: 1971; January 27, 1996
- Running time: 75 min (1970); 27 min (1971); 75 min (1996)
- Country: Japan
- Language: Japanese

Emperor Tomato Ketchup (トマトケチャップ皇帝, Tomato Kechappu Kōtei) is a Japanese short experimental film made by Shūji Terayama in 1970. A 27-minute cut was released in 1971. A "director's cut" of sorts, attempting to recreate the film as originally made, was released as a 75-minute feature in 1996, thirteen years after Terayama's death.

A twelve minute abridgement of the film, Rock Paper Scissors War (ジャンケン戦争, Jan-ken-sensō), was also released in 1971.

== Plot ==
Set in an indeterminate future in which children have overthrown adults and established their own empire, the film does not have a central narrative or identifiable character roles. Rather it depicts a series of graphic tableaux in which children (played onscreen by actual children) engage in cruel and abusive acts against the adults under their dominion. These include scenes of child soldiers arresting, enslaving, executing, and raping helpless victims, often held at gunpoint.

A constitution is read aloud, establishing the basic laws of the empire and the supremacy of children over adults. The title of "Emperor Tomato Ketchup" is derived from the stipulated favorite food of children enshrined in the constitution. The titular boy emperor lazily lords over his parents and shows disinterest in the young girl who is his designated concubine. He later sexually assaults a glamorous woman, suckling on her breasts and placing his head between her thighs.

The violent overthrow of the adult government is understood by the children in the film as akin to rock paper scissors (じゃん・けん・ポン, jan-ken-pon).

The film includes scenes of animal abuse, drag play, fascism, Nazism, racism, rape, the Ku Klux Klan, nudity, and sexual fetishism as well as pantomimed erotic acts involving both children and adults.

== Reception ==
Rex Reed described the film as an "avant-garde porno flick" and "the most disgusting thing [he]'d ever seen", writing in The New York Daily News that it caused a "scandal" in Paris, where he saw it.

Writing retrospectively in visual arts journal Afterall, Thomas Dylan Eaton describes the longer cut of the film, which in his opinion is Terayama's most "disturbing", as a "triumphant insurrection [against] film", although being, if not "scatological", then containing "malignant humour [...] more often offensive than amusing".

== Awards ==
The film had the honor of being shown at a very early edition of the Quinzaine des Réalisateurs, an independent selection of Cannes, in 1972.

== Cast ==
- Keiko Niitaka (新高恵子)
- Salvador Tari (サルバドール・タリ)
- Tarō Apollo (アポロ太郎)
- Mitsufumi Hashimoto (橋本光史)

== Influence ==
- The French anarcho-punk rock band, Bérurier Noir, named the 2nd song of their album Abracadadoum, "L'empereur Tomato Ketchup" in 1987
- The British alternative rock band Stereolab named their 1996 album Emperor Tomato Ketchup after the film.
