= Maki Asakawa =

Japanese jazz and blues singer (1942-2010)

- Asakawa on the cover of the compilation album Darkness IV (2007)

Background information
- Born: January 27, 1942; Mikawa, Ishikawa, Japan
- Died: January 17, 2010 (aged 67) Nagoya, Aichi, Japan
- Genres: Jazz; Blues
- Occupations: Singer; lyricist; composer; music producer
- Years active: 1967–2010

Maki Asakawa (Japanese: 浅川マキ, Hepburn: Asakawa Maki; January 27, 1942 – January 17, 2010) was a Japanese jazz and blues singer, lyricist and composer. Known as the "Queen of the Underground" (アングラの女王, Angura no Joō), she was an important voice of Japan's urban counterculture.

== Biography ==
Born in Mikawa (now part of the city of Hakusan), Ishikawa Prefecture, after graduating high school she worked as a teller in the local national pensions office before moving to Tokyo. Influenced by the styles of Mahalia Jackson and Billie Holiday, she began her career singing at US Army bases and cabarets.

Asakawa made her debut recording, "Tokyo Banka/Amen Jiro" with Victor in 1967. After appearing in a series of concerts organized by underground playwright Shuji Terayama in 1968, she signed with Toshiba, now EMI Music Japan, and released the popular songs, 夜が明けたら (Yo ga aketara; At the Break of Dawn) and かもめ (Kamome; Gull) in 1969. Her debut album, Asakawa Maki no Sekai, was released in 1970.

In addition to writing and composing, she also released cover versions of traditional American folk and blues songs freely rendered into Japanese, such as "Kimyō na kajitsu (奇妙な果実)" (Strange Fruit), "Asahi no ataru ie (朝日のあたる家)" (The House of the Rising Sun), "Gin House Blues", etc.

She became popular in the 1970s and had more than 30 album releases by the end of the 1990s, after which she was mostly known for performing live.

Asakawa collaborated with musicians such as Yosuke Yamashita and Ryuichi Sakamoto. She continued performing live until the time of her death. Scheduled to perform in Nagoya January 15–17, 2010, she died before her show on the 17th, at the age of 67, of heart failure, just 10 days before her 68th birthday.
