= Shūji Terayama =

Japanese artist (1935–1983)

- Born: December 10, 1935; Hirosaki, Aomori Prefecture, Japan
- Died: May 4, 1983 (aged 47); Tokyo, Japan
- Occupations: Artist; Author; Poet; Dramatist; Director; Photographer
- Years active: 1956–1983
- Spouse: Kyoko Kujo (m. 1963; div. 1970)

Shūji Terayama (寺山 修司, Terayama Shūji; December 10, 1935 – May 4, 1983) was a Japanese avant-garde poet, artist, dramatist, writer, film director, and photographer. His works range from radio drama, experimental television, underground (Angura) theatre, countercultural essays, to Japanese New Wave and "expanded" cinema.

Many critics view him as one of the most productive and provocative creative artists to come out of Japan. He has been cited as an influence on various Japanese filmmakers from the 1970s onward.

== Life ==
Terayama was born December 10, 1935, in Hirosaki, Aomori, the only son of Hachiro and Hatsu Terayama. When Terayama was nine, his mother moved to Kyūshū to work at an American military base, while he himself went to live with relatives in the city of Misawa, also in Aomori. Terayama lived through the Aomori air raids that killed more than 30,000 people. His father died at the end of the Pacific War in Indonesia in September 1945.

Terayama entered Aomori High School in 1951 and, in 1954, he enrolled in Waseda University's Faculty of Education to study Japanese language and literature. However, he soon dropped out because he fell ill with nephrotic syndrome. He received his education through working in bars in Shinjuku. By 18, he was the second winner of the Tanka Studies Award.

He married Kyōko Kujō (九條今日子) on April 2, 1963: they would later co-found the Tenjō Sajiki theatre troupe. Kujō later began an extramarital affair with fellow co-founder Yutaka Higashi. She and Terayama formally divorced in December 1970, although they continued to work together until Terayama's death on May 4, 1983, from cirrhosis of the liver. Kujō died on April 30, 2014.

== Career ==
His oeuvre includes a number of essays claiming that more can be learned about life through boxing and horse racing than by attending school and studying hard. Accordingly, he was one of the central figures of the "runaway" movement in Japan in the late 1960s, as depicted in his book, play, and film Throw Away Your Books, Rally in the Streets! (書を捨てよ、町へ出よう).

In 1967, Terayama formed the Tenjō Sajiki theater troupe, whose name comes from the Japanese translation of the 1945 Marcel Carné film Les Enfants du Paradis and literally translates to "ceiling gallery" (with a meaning similar to the English term "peanut gallery"). The troupe was dedicated to the avant-garde and staged a number of controversial plays tackling social issues from an iconoclastic perspective in unconventional venues, such the streets of Tokyo or private homes. Some major plays include "Bluebeard" (青ひげ), "Yes" (イエス), and "The Crime of Fatso Oyama" (大山デブコの犯罪).

Many influential artists were frequent collaborators or members of Tenjō Sajiki. Artists Aquirax Uno and Tadanori Yokoo designed many of the advertisement posters for the group. Musically, Terayama worked closely with experimental composer J.A. Seazer and folk musician Kan Mikami. Fellow Waseda University alumnus Kohei Ando collaborated with Terayama as a Production Assistant. Sci-fi author Izumi Suzuki acted in Tenjō Sajiki productions, and the troupe staged some of Suzuki's own plays. Playwright Rio Kishida was also part of the company. She viewed Terayama as a mentor, and together they collaborated on Shintokumaru (Poison Boy), The Audience Seats, and Lemmings.

Terayama experimented with 'city plays', a fantastical satire of civic life.

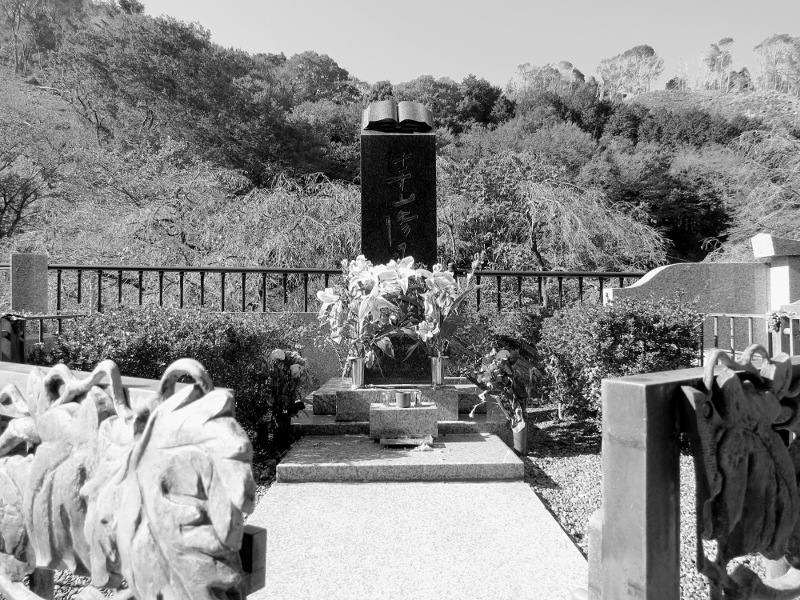
Shuji Terayama's grave (Takao Cemetery zone A front row, 高尾霊園A区) Google maps view

Also in 1967, Terayama started an experimental cinema and gallery called 'Universal Gravitation,' which is still in existence at Misawa as a resource center. The Terayama Shūji Memorial Hall, which has a large collection of his plays, novels, poetry, photography and a great number of his personal effects and relics from his theatre productions, can also be found in Misawa.

With the Tenjo Sajiki Troupe, Terayama directed two plays at the Shiraz Arts Festival, "Origin of Blood", in 1973 and "Ship of Folly", in 1976. In 1976, he was a member of the jury at the 26th Berlin International Film Festival.

== Legacy ==
In 1997, the Shuji Terayama Museum was opened in Misawa, Aomori, with personal items donated by his mother, Hatsu. The museum was designed by visual artist Kiyoshi Awazu, who had previously collaborated with Terayama. As of 2015, the museum's director is poet Eimei Sasaki, who had previously starred in Throw Away Your Books, Rally in the Streets (1968).

Asahi Shimbun named an award after Terayama with the inauguration of their Asahi Performing Arts Awards in 2001. "The Terayama Shūji Prize is meant to recognize artistic innovation by individuals or organizations who have demonstrated artistic innovation". However, the awards were suspended in 2008.

Terayama wrote lyrics to many songs that became generational hits, including Maki Asakawa's Kamome (Seagull) and Carmen Maki's Toki ni wa haha no nai ko no you ni (Sometimes like a motherless child).

In March 2012, Tate Modern in London hosted a tribute to Terayama that was attended by Kyōko Kujō and Terayama's assistant director, Henrikku Morisaki.

== Works ==
His oeuvre is well known for its experimentalism and includes but is not limited to:

=== Plays ===
- La Marie-Vision / Kegawa no Marie (1967)
- Throw Away Your Books, Rally in the Streets / Sho o Suteyo, Machi e Deyō (1968)
- The Crime of Dr. Gali-gari / Gali-gari Hakase no Hanzai (1969)
- The Man-powered Plane (1970)
- Jashumon (1971)
- Run, Melos / Hashire Melos (1972)
- The Opium War / Ahen Senso (1972)
- Note to a Blind Man / Mojin Shokan (1973)
- Origin of Blood (1973)
- Knock (1975)
- Journal of the Plague Year / Ekibyo Ryuko-ki (1975)
- Ship of Folly (1976)
- The Miraculous Mandarin / Chugoku no Fushigina Yakunin (1977)
- Directions to Servants / Nuhikun (1978)
- Lemmings to the End of the World / Lemmings - Sekai no Hate Made Tsurettete (1979)

=== Poetry ===
- May for Me / Ware ni gogatsu wo (1957, free verse)
- Barefoot lovesong / Hadashi no koiuta (1957, prose poems)
- Book in the sky / Sora ni wa hon (1957, tanka)
- Blood and wheat / Chi to mugi (1958, tanka)
- To you, alone / Hitoribocchi no anata ni (1965, prose poems)
- To die in the countryside / Den-en ni shisu (1965, tanka)
- My Golden Bough / Waga kinshihen (1973, haiku)
- Pollen voyage / Kafun-koukai (1975, haiku)

=== Fiction ===
- Ah Wilderness / Aa, Kouya (1966, novel)
- Translated short fiction collected in: The Crimson Thread of Abandon (2014) and When I was a Wolf (2018)

=== Screenplays ===
- Dry Lake / Youth In Fury (1960), directed by Masahiro Shinoda
- Killers on Parade (1961), directed by Masahiro Shinoda
- Tears on the Lion’s Mane / A Flame of Youth (1962), directed by Masahiro Shinoda
- Mothers / Haha-tachi (1967), directed by Toshio Matsumoto
- Nanami: The Inferno of First love (1968), directed by Susumu Hani
- The Scandalous Adventures of Buraikan (1970), directed by Masahiro Shinoda
- Third Base (1978), directed by Yōichi Higashi
- A Tale of Africa (1980), directed by Susumu Hani

=== Short films ===
- Catology (1960) (lost)
- The Cage / Ori (1964)
- Emperor Tomato Ketchup / Tomato Kechappu Kōtei (1971, short version)
- The War of Jan-Ken Pon / Janken Sensō (1971)
- Roller / Rolla (1974)
- Butterfly / Chōfuku-ki (1974)
- Cinema Guide for Young People / Seishōnen no Tame no Eiga Nyūmon (1974)
- The Labyrinth Tale / Meikyū-tan (1975)
- A Tale of Smallpox / Hōsō-tan 疱瘡譚 (1975)
- Der Prozess / Shimpan (1975)
- Les Chants de Maldoror / Marudororu no Uta (1977)
- The Eraser / Keshigomu (1977)
- Shadow Film – A Woman with Two Heads / Nitō-onna – Kage no Eiga (1977)
- The Reading Machine / Shokenki (1977)
- An Attempt to Describe the Measure of A Man / Issunbōshi o Kijutsusuru Kokoromi (1977)

=== Feature-length films ===
- Emperor Tomato Ketchup / Tomato Kechappu Kōtei (1971, long version)
- Throw Away Your Books, Rally in the Streets / Sho o Suteyo, Machi e Deyō (1971)
- Pastoral: To Die in the Country / Den'en ni Shisu (a.k.a. Pastoral Hide and Seek) (1974)
- Boxer / Bokusā (1977)
- Fruits of Passion / Shanhai Ijin Shōkan (1981)
- The Lemmings / Remingu (1983)
- Grass Labyrinth / Kusa-meikyū (1983)
- Video Letter (1983, with Shuntarō Tanikawa)
- Farewell to the Ark / Saraba hakobune (1984)

=== Photography ===
- Photothèque imaginaire de Shuji Terayama - Les Gens de la famille Chien-Dieu (1975)

== See also ==
- Bombing of Aomori in World War II
