= Tenjō Sajiki =

Japanese theatre troupe

Tenjō Sajiki, also Tenjou Sajiki (天井桟敷, Tenjō Sajiki), was a Japanese independent theater troupe co-founded by Shūji Terayama and whose members include Kohei Ando, Kujō Kyōko, Yutaka Higashi, Tadanori Yokoo, and Fumiko Takagi.

It was led by Shūji Terayama and active between 1967 and 1983 (until Terayama's death). A major phenomenon on the Japanese Angura ("underground") theater scene, the group has produced a number of stage works marked by experimentalism, folklore influences, social provocation, grotesque eroticism and the flamboyant fantasy characteristic of Terayama's oeuvre. Tenjō Sajiki benefitted greatly from collaborations with a number of prominent artists, including musicians J. A. Seazer and Kan Mikami, and graphic designers Aquirax Uno and Tadanori Yokoo.

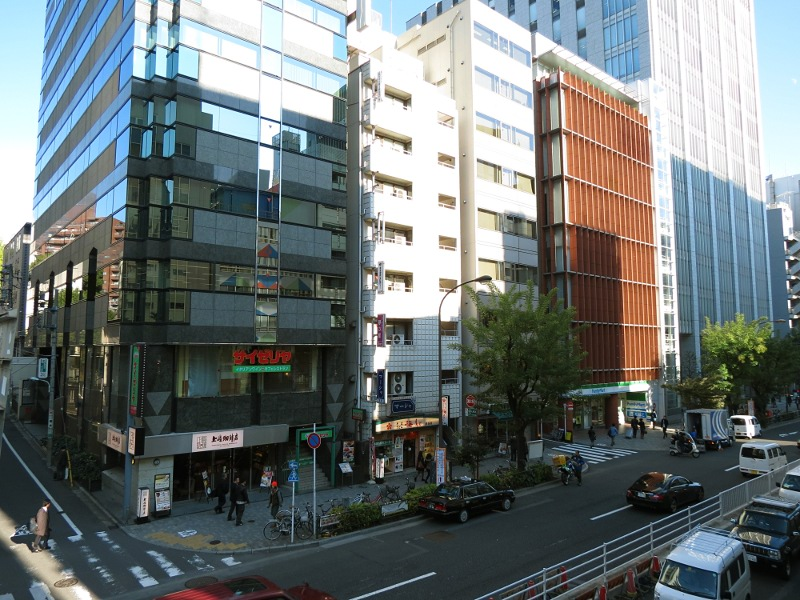
Former location of Tenjō Sajiki Sajiki Shibuya theater, photographed in November 2012. Google maps view. Historical photo for comparison available here .

The name is from 天井桟敷の人々, the Japanese title of the film Children of Paradise.

== Stage productions ==
(arranged by the year of premiere performance)

=== 1967 ===
- The Hunchback of Aomori (青森県のせむし男)
- The Crime of Fatso Oyama (大山デブコの犯罪)
- Mink Marie (毛皮のマリー, La Marie-vison)
- Hanafuda denki (花札伝綺)

=== 1968 ===
- Shinjuku Tales of 1001 Nights (新宿版千一夜物語)
- Bluebeard (青ひげ)
- 伯爵令嬢小鷹狩掬子の七つの大罪
- Farewell, cinema! (さらば映画よ)
- 瞼の母
- 昭和白虎隊外伝
- Throw away your books, rally in the streets! (書を捨てよ街へ出よう)
- The Little Prince (星の王子さま)

=== 1969 ===
- Our age comes riding on a circus elephant (時代はサーカスの象に乗って)
- Inugami (犬神)
- The Crime of Dr. Caligari (ガリガリ博士の犯罪)

=== 1970 ===
- Yes (イエス)
- Baron Burabura (ブラブラ男爵)
- Tokyo Year Zero (東京零年)
- Man-powered plane Solomon (人力飛行機ソロモン)

=== 1971 ===
- Heretics (邪宗門)
- 地獄より愛を込めて

=== 1972 ===
- Run, Melos! (走れメロス)
- The Opium War (阿片戦争)
- 人力飛行機ソロモンの組立て方

=== 1973 ===
- 地球空洞説
- ある家族の血の起源
- Blind Man's Letters (盲人書簡)
- Origin of Blood

=== 1975 ===
- Knock (ノック)
- Chronicles of a Plague (疫病流行記)
- The Nail (釘)

=== 1976 ===
- Ship of Folly (阿呆船)
- The Laws of Gravitation (引力の法則)

=== 1977 ===
- The Miraculous Mandarin (中国の不思議な役人)

=== 1978 ===
- Directions to Servants (奴婢訓)
- Shintokumaru (身毒丸)
- (The Audience's Seats) 観客席

=== 1979 ===
- The Lemmings (レミング)
- Child-hunting (こども狩り)
- Duke Bluebeard's Castle (青ひげ公の城)

=== 1981 ===
- One Hundred Years of Solitude (百年の孤独)

== Selected performances abroad ==
- 1969: Inugami and La Marie-vison in Frankfurt.
- 1970: La Marie Vison at La MaMa Experimental Theater Club in New York, with American actors and highly original staging (Eleonore Lester, There will be no audience, in New York Times, July 5, 1970, p. 12). The audience had to visit the actors in separate rooms, and could not see the entire performance.
- 1971: Heretics and Man-powered plane Solomon at Festival mondial de théâtre in Nancy; La Marie-vison at Théâtre des Halles in Paris and Heretics at Mickery Theatre in Amsterdam and also in Belgrade.
- 1972: Hanafuda denki at Théâtre Pigalle in Paris; Run, Melos! at Spielstrasse in Munich and The Opium War at Mickery Theatre in Amsterdam.
- 1973: Performances of Origin of Blood at the Shiraz-Persepolis Festival in Iran, the Netherlands and Poland.
- 1976: Performances of Ship of Folly at the Shiraz-Persepolis Festival in Iran.
- 1978: Directions to Servants at Mickery Theatre in Amsterdam.
