= Dersu Uzala (disambiguation) =

Dersu Uzala (1849—1908) was a hunter and a guide of Russian explorer Vladimir Arsenyev.

Dersu Uzala may also refer to:

- 4142 Dersu-Uzala, a minor planet
- Dersu Uzala (book), a book by Vladimir Arsenyev about his friend and guide
- Dersu Uzala (1961 film) by Agasi Babayan
- Dersu Uzala (1975 film) by Akira Kurosawa
