= Kola Beldy =

Soviet-Russian singer (1929–1993)

Nikolay Ivanovich 'Kola' Beldy (Russian: Никола́й Ива́нович "Кола́" Бельды́, 2 May 1929 – 21 December 1993) was a Soviet-Russian pop singer of Nanai ethnicity.

== Early years ==
Kola Beldy was born in the Khabarovsk Territory in the family of a hunter. He was orphaned early.

During the Great Patriotic War, he escaped through Khabarovsk to the front, attributing to himself two extra years, and became a cabin boy of the Pacific Fleet. He participated in combat operations in Korea. He performed in the Song and Dance Ensemble of the Pacific Fleet. After graduating from an external music school, Beldy continued his service as a diesel engine driver on a minesweeper of the Pacific Fleet

== Popularity ==
In 1957, he became a laureate of the 6th World Festival of Youth and Students in Moscow. In 1960, he became a laureate of the All-Russian competition of pop artists. In 1986, he was awarded the title of Meritorious Artist of the RSFSR. He had a number of Soviet-era hits, most famously "Увезу тебя я в тундру" (I will take you to the tundra). He was signed to Melodiya Moscow, in 1973 winning them Award no. 2 at the Sopot International Song Festival.

Since the 1970s, Beldy has been engaged in research work—collecting and preserving unique national songs of the Northern people. Having failed to audition for the main role in the film "Dersu Uzala" directed by Akira Kurosawa and Vladimir Vasiliev, he helped Kurosawa to select national melodies, and also rehearsed with the performer of the main role Maxim Munzuk.

In the late 80s, he released the album "White Island" with interpretations of folk songs of the indigenous inhabitants of the North in Russian; according to critic Alexander Gorbachev, "this gloomy electronics mixed with ethnic motifs creates a wild and mysterious atmosphere, akin to that which arises when listening to Western bands that participated in the industrial movement, but with taiga notes." In the mid-80's Beldy also took part in the stage experiments of the Pop-Mechanics project.

Kola Beldy toured nationally and internationally for over 30 years, performing in 46 countries. In France, he was called "The golden voice of the North", and the Emperor of Ethiopia awarded him the Order of his country.

== Legacy ==
According to musicologist and rock critic Artemy Troitsky he "scored with some tundra-orientated megahits in the seventies and is considered a hallmark of Soviet snow-opera kitsch". According to Konstantin Bogdanov, Kola Beldy, "although he was a Nanai by nationality, played with visible pleasure in public the already established features of the so-called "Chukchi accent" and liked to tell jokes about the Chukchi. And he positioned on the stage exactly the image that was related not to the ethnographic, but to the quite imaginary—"folklore"—reality of the Soviet Union"

A Meteor-class ship of the Amur River Shipping Company was named "Kola Beldy". In Khabarovsk, there is a Kola Beldy Street. A street in the administrative center of the Nanai district, the village of Troitskoye, is also named in his honor.

== Discography ==
EPs

- 1971 – Кола Бельды ("Kola Beldy")

Studio albums

- 1973 – Поёт Кола Бельды ("Poyot Kola Beldy")
- 1982 – Хейдже (Здравица) ("Heige (Zdravitsa)")
- 1985 – Приди, весна ("Pridi, vesna")
- 1988 – White Island
