= 4142 Dersu-Uzala =

Mars-crossing asteroid

Discovery
- Discovered by: Z. Vávrová
- Discovery site: Kleť Obs.
- Discovery date: 28 May 1981

Designations
- Named after: Dersu Uzala (Siberian trapper and hunter)
- Alternative designations: 1981 KE · 1970 AB; 1982 VB
- Minor planet category: Mars-crosser; Hungaria

Orbital characteristics
- Epoch 23 March 2018 (JD 2458200.5)
- Uncertainty parameter 0
- Observation arc: 48.38 yr (17,672 d)
- Aphelion: 2.2005 AU
- Perihelion: 1.6230 AU
- Semi-major axis: 1.9117 AU
- Eccentricity: 0.1510
- Orbital period (sidereal): 2.64 yr (965 d)
- Mean anomaly: 71.888°
- Mean motion: 0° 22^{m} 22.44^{s} / day
- Inclination: 26.494°
- Longitude of ascending node: 60.661°
- Argument of perihelion: 55.384°

Physical characteristics
- Mean diameter: 6.01±1.81 km 6.02±0.60 km 6.34±0.19 km
- Synodic rotation period: 140±3 h (Note: Lightcurve plot of 4142 Dersu-Uzala, Palmer Divide Observatory, B. D. Warner (2006). Quality code is 3. Summary figures at the LCDB.)
- Geometric albedo: 0.164; 0.30; 0.307
- Spectral type: SMASS = A Srw
- Absolute magnitude (H): 13.00; 13.1; 13.42; 13.60

4142 Dersu-Uzala, provisional designation 1981 KE, is a Hungaria asteroid, sizable Mars-crosser and potentially slow rotator from the innermost region of the asteroid belt, approximately 6 kilometers (3.7 miles) in diameter. It was discovered by Czech astronomer Zdeňka Vávrová at Kleť Observatory on 28 May 1981. The rare A-type asteroid has a rotation period of 140 hours. It was named after the Siberian trapper and hunter Dersu Uzala.

== Orbit and characterization ==
Dersu-Uzala is a member of the dynamical Hungaria group of asteroids, which form the innermost dense concentration of asteroids in the Solar System. It orbits the Sun in the inner asteroid belt at a distance of 1.6–2.2 AU once every 2 years and 8 months (965 days; semi-major axis of 1.91 AU). Its orbit has an eccentricity of 0.15 and an inclination of 26° with respect to the ecliptic. As its orbit crosses that of Mars at 1.66 AU, it is also a Mars crossing asteroid. The body's observation arc begins with its first observation as 1970 AB at Crimea-Nauchnij in January 1970, or 11 years prior to its official discovery observation at Kleť Observatory.

== Naming ==
This minor planet was named after Dersu Uzala, a Siberian trapper and hunter and friend of Russian writer Vladimir Arsenyev, who named the main character of his novel Dersu Uzala after him. The approved naming citation was published by the Minor Planet Center on 6 February 1993 (M.P.C. 21609).

== Physical characteristics ==
In the SMASS classification, Dersu-Uzala is an A-type asteroid. It has also been characterized as an Srw-type, a subtype of the stony S-type asteroids.

=== Rotation period ===
In December 2006, a rotational lightcurve of Dersu-Uzala was obtained from photometric observations by American photometrist Brian Warner at the Palmer Divide Observatory in Colorado. Lightcurve analysis gave a rotation period of 140±3 hours with a brightness amplitude of 0.60 magnitude (U=2). Alternative observations gave a period of 71 and 71.2 hours, respectively.

=== Diameter and albedo ===
According to the surveys carried out by the Japanese Akari satellite and NASA's Wide-field Infrared Survey Explorer with its subsequent NEOWISE mission, Dersu-Uzala measures 6.01 and 6.34 kilometers in diameter and its surface has an albedo of 0.164 and 0.30, respectively. The Collaborative Asteroid Lightcurve Link assumes a standard albedo for a stony asteroid of 0.2 and calculates a diameter of 7.13 kilometers based on an absolute magnitude of 13.1.
