= Maxim Munzuk =

Tuvan actor, 1910 – 1999

Maxim Monguzhukovich Munzuk (Russian: Максим Монгужукович Мунзук; Tuvan: Максим Монгужук-оглу Мунзук, romanized: Maksim Mongužuk-oglu Munzuk; 2 May 1910 – 28 July 1999) was a Tuvan actor, one of the founders of the Republic of Tuva's regional theatre. He is best known for playing the title role in Akira Kurosawa's film Dersu Uzala.

Munzuk was an actor, director, singer, collector of musical folklore, composer, and teacher. He began his career as a military musician and led the orchestra of Tyva’s Artillery Regiment. He founded the Tuvan musical-drama theatre in the 1930s and performed a variety of roles.

Akira Kurosawa picked Munzuk as the lead in his Soviet-financed epic Dersu Uzala (1975), along with Yury Solomin as writer-explorer Vladimir Arsenyev on whose 1923 book the film was based. Munzuk's impressive acting contributed greatly to the film’s international success — the picture won the 1975 Academy Award for Best Foreign Language Film.

He was awarded the titles of People's Artist of the RSFSR and of the Tuvan ASSR, and was also awarded the State Prize of the Republic of Tuva.

In 2004, the government of Tuva funded a prize for Best Actor named after Munzuk, awarded annually at a national competition; the same year, the Dersu Uzala Foundation was inaugurated, also named in Munzuk’s memory and intended to support Tuvinian artists.

== Filmography ==
- Dersu Uzala (1975) – Dersu Uzala
- Siberiade (1979) – Fedka the hunter
- Valentina (1981) – Ilya Yeremyev, hunter
