= Dersu Uzala (1961 film) =

Dersu Uzala Дерсу Узала
- Directed by: Agasi Babayan
- Written by: Vladimir Arsenyev (book); Igor Bolgarin
- Starring: Adolf Shestakov; Kasym Zhakibayev; Aleksandr Baranov; N. Gladkov; Lev Lobov
- Cinematography: Anatoli Kaznin
- Music by: Merab Partskhaladze
- Production company: Tsentrnauchfilm
- Release date: 1961
- Running time: 86 min
- Country: Soviet Union
- Language: Russian

Dersu Uzala (Russian: Дерсу Узала) is a 1961 Soviet film adapted from the book by Vladimir Arsenyev about his travels in the Russian Far East with the native trapper Dersu Uzala. The film was directed by Agasi Babayan from a screenplay by screenwriter Igor Bolgarin. The film starred actors Adolf Shestakov and Kasym Zhakibayev.

== Plot ==
The young Russian scientist Vladimir Arsenyev conducts research on the Ussuri region of the Russian Empire. During his expedition in the taiga, he meets the hunter Dersu Uzala, who becomes his guide and loyal friend. Dersu amazes Arsenyev with his deep knowledge of the taiga, his ability to read the forest like an open book, and his unique respect for nature.

As they journey through the wilderness, the group encounters various challenges: Dersu wards off a tiger using only persuasion, navigates treacherous swamps, and confronts poachers, confiscating their illegally obtained goods and expelling them from the Ussuri region. On one occasion, Arsenyev discovers a piece of coal and sets out with Dersu to locate its source. During this trek, Arsenyev falls ill and becomes trapped in a forest fire, only to be rescued by Dersu.

Reuniting with their group, Arsenyev and Dersu continue their expedition. Winter overtakes them while they are still traveling. Borrowing a boat from local villagers, the team journeys along a freezing river but suffers a shipwreck, losing all their supplies, including warm clothing, ammunition, and food. Despite these hardships, they press on, eventually celebrating New Year's Eve while camping for the night.

Fortunately, their journey concludes safely, as their New Year's campsite is close to the coastline. The group reaches the shore, where Arsenyev and the others bid a heartfelt farewell to Dersu before departing aboard their waiting ship.

== Cast ==
- Adolf Shestakov
- Kasym Zhakibayev
- Aleksandr Baranov
- N. Gladkov
- Lev Lobov
- Spiridon Grigoryev
- A. Yevstifyev
- Mikhail Medvedev
- Pyotr Lyubeshkin
- Nikolai Khryashchikov

== See also ==
- Dersu Uzala (1975), a Soviet-Japanese film version directed by Akira Kurosawa
