= Dersu =

Village in Primorsky Krai, Russia

Coordinates: 45.7500°N 135.3167°E

Dersu is a small village located in the Primorsky Krai, in the Far Eastern Federal District of Russia. It is populated primarily by Old Believers. Named after Dersu Uzala. Before 1972 it had the Chinese name Laulyu (Russian: Лаулю).
