= Dersu Uzala =

Russian hunter and trapper (1849–1908)

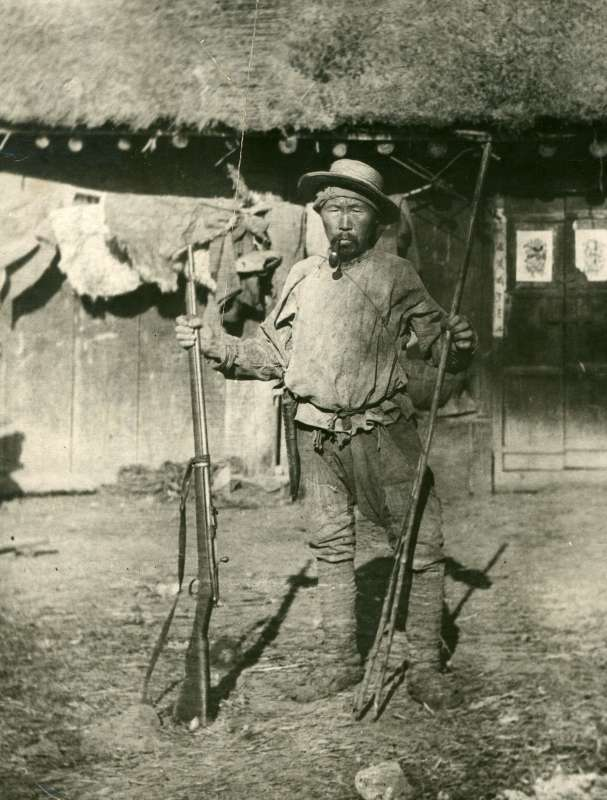
Uzala posing for a photo with his Berdan and hunting accessories, 1906

Dersu Uzala (Russian: Дерсу Узала; c. 1849 – 1908) was a Nanai trapper and hunter in the Okhotsk–Manchurian taiga. He worked as a guide for Vladimir Arsenyev, who immortalized him in his 1923 book Dersu Uzala. The book was adapted into two feature films, with the version by Akira Kurosawa being the better known one.

Dersu identified himself to Arsenyev as Nanai, and in the 1970s a Nanai named Fyodor Uza proudly spoke of him as a relative. However, another local historian speculated that he was Udege, pointing out that the clothing, language, and customs attributed to Dersu by Arsenyev are closer to Udege than Nanai.

== Life ==
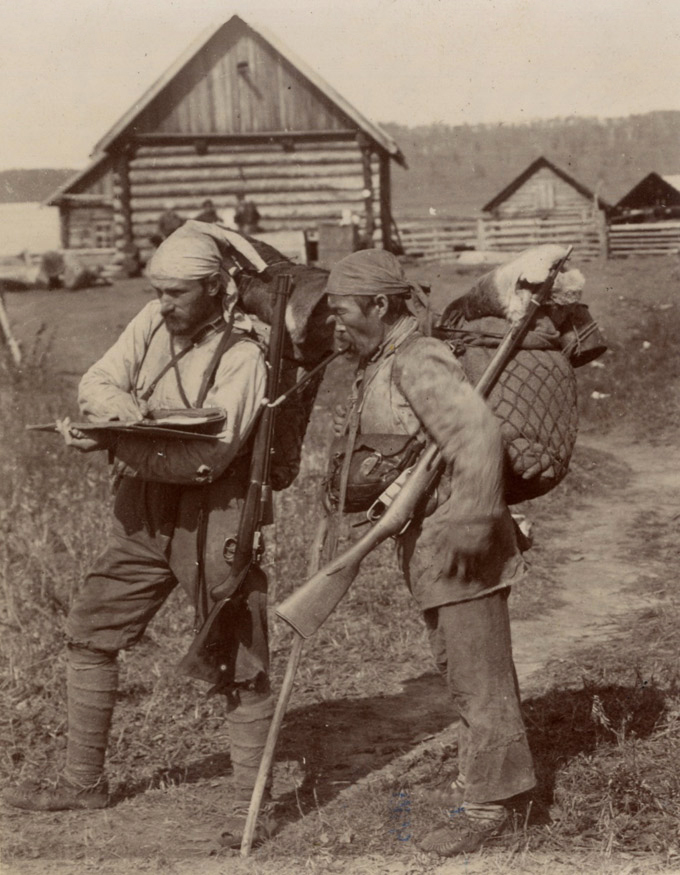
Vladimir Arsenyev and Uzala

The Russian explorer Vladimir Arsenyev started his expeditions to the forests of the Far East in the area of Ussuri in 1902. He described numerous species of Siberian flora and the lifestyle of native ethnic people.

When Arsenyev met the trapper Uzala he hired him as a guide for his journeys, Uzala earned the respect of Arsenyev and his team. When Uzala's eyesight and other senses began to fade with age, Arsenyev offered to take him to the city where he lived. Uzala discovered that he was not permitted to chop wood or to build a hut and fireplace in the city park, nor was he allowed to shoot within the city limits. In the spring of 1908 he asked Arsenyev for permission to return to the woods. As a parting gift, Arsenyev gave him a new Mosin-Nagant rifle.

Shortly afterward, Dersu Uzala was murdered.

== Cultural references ==
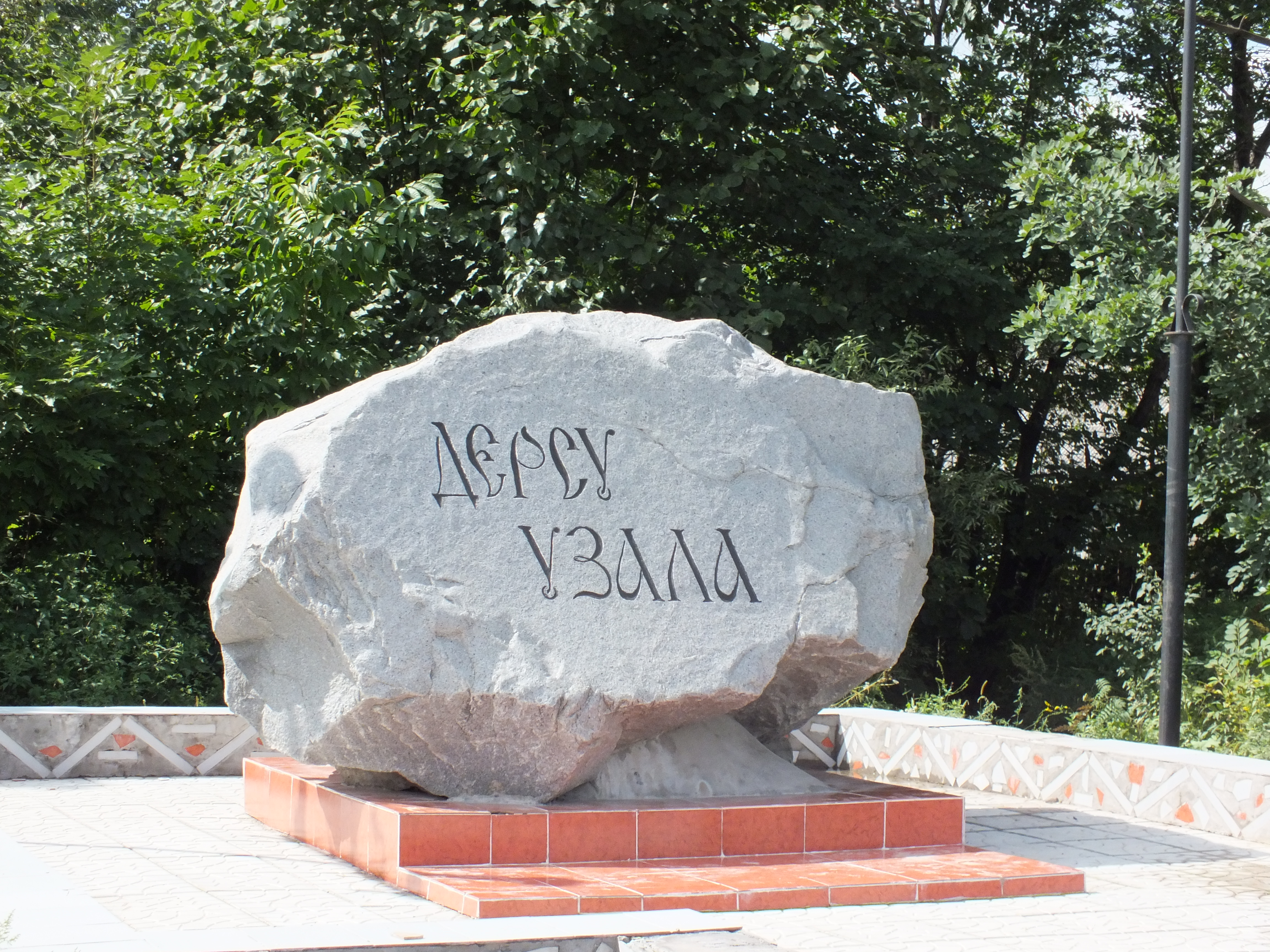
Memorial stone for Uzala in Korfovsky

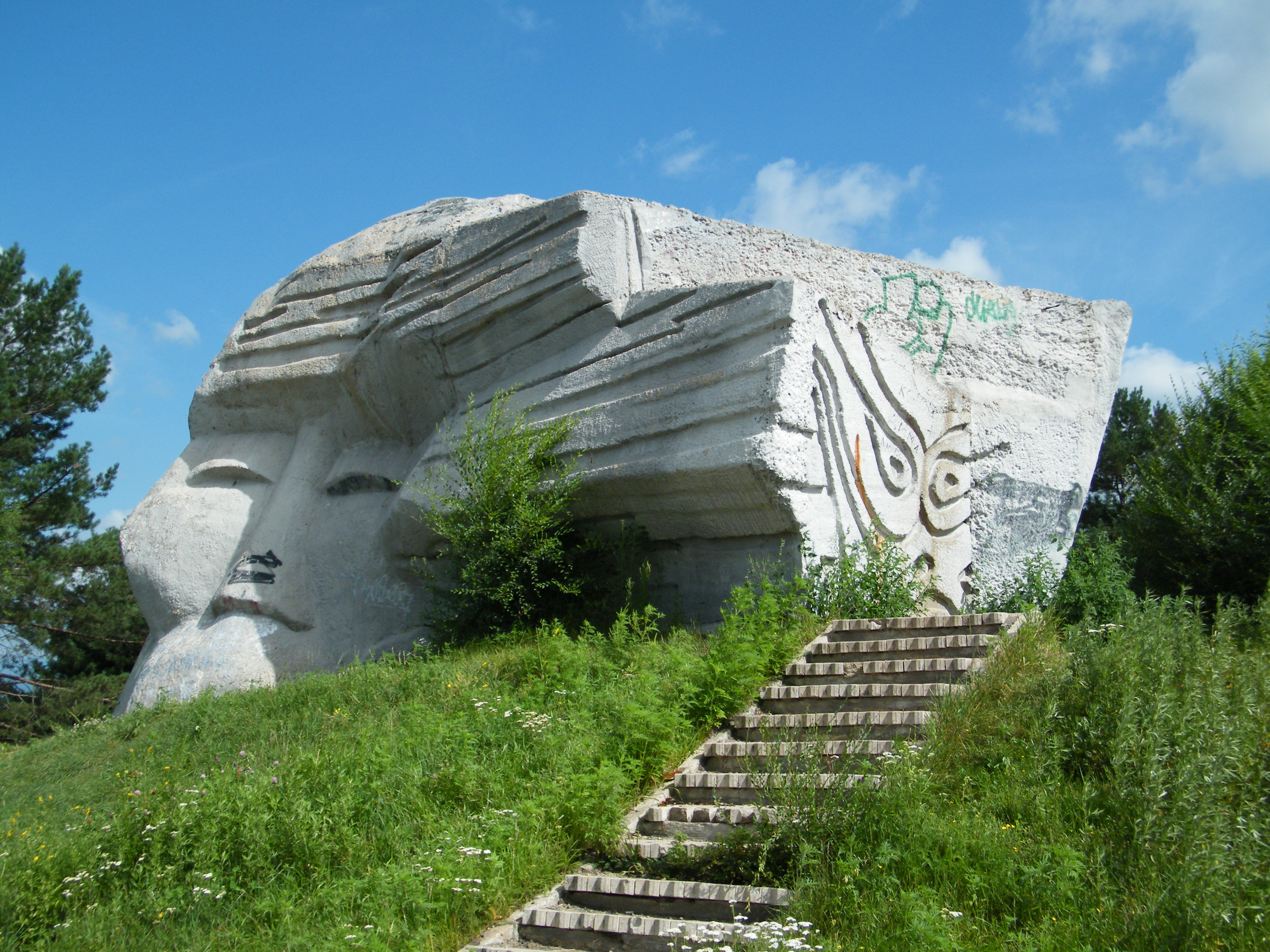
Monument for Uzala in Arsenyev

In 1923 Arsenyev released his book Dersu Usala, which later was released under the alternate U.S. titles With Dersu the Hunter and Dersu the Trapper.

The book was adapted into two feature films. In 1961 director Agasi Babayan made the first adaption Dersu Uzala. Kasym Zhakibayev took the role of Uzala. The second film was filmed in 1975 by Akira Kurosawa. Uzala was played by Maxim Munzuk. Kurosawa's film won the Golden Prize and the Prix FIPRESCI at the 9th Moscow International Film Festival and the 1976 Oscar for Best Foreign Language Film.

In 1972 a village in Krasnoarmeysky District, Primorsky Krai, which before had the Chinese name of Laulyu was renamed Dersu in his honour.

A monument for Uzala and Arsenyev was erected near Arsenyev in the 1970s.

The main belt asteroid 4142 Dersu-Uzala was discovered in 1981 and named after the trapper.
