= Maksim Passar =

Soviet sniper in World War II

- Максим Александрович Пассар
- Born: 30 August 1923; Nizhny Katar village, Far Eastern Krai, USSR (located within present-day Khabarovsk Krai)
- Died: 22 January 1943 (aged 19); Peschanka village, Gorodishchensky District, USSR
- Military career
- Allegiance: Soviet Union
- Branch: Red Army
- Service years: 1942–1943
- Rank: Senior Sergeant
- Units: 117 RR/ 23 RD/ 21 A/ StalF; 117 RR/ 71 GRD/ 65 A/ DonF
- Conflicts: World War II †
- Awards: Hero of the Russian Federation; Two Orders of the Red Banner

Maksim Aleksandrovich Passar (Russian: Максим Александрович Пассар; 30 August 1923 – 22 January 1943) was a Soviet sniper in the Red Army during World War II credited with killing 237 enemy soldiers. Decades after he was killed in action during the war, he was posthumously awarded the title Hero of the Russian Federation in 2010.

== Early life ==
Passar was born on 30 August 1923 to a Nanai family of fur hunters in Nizhny Katar (Нижний Катар) (48°49′11″N 135°20′25″E) in the present-day Nanaysky District of the Russian Far East.

As a young child, Passar helped his father hunt for furred animals. From this, he gained strong marksmanship skills, including the ability to shoot squirrels in the eye so that he could use as much of the fur as possible. He also developed the patience necessary to remain still observing a target in the winter cold. Having started attending school in 1933, he dreamed of going to Leningrad for higher education after graduating. He was the older brother of poet Andrei Passar [ru].

== World War II ==
After traveling 60 kilometers on foot to the Troitsk military enlistment office in February 1942 to join the army, and despite demonstrating his sharpshooting skills to the recruiters, he was initially posted as a mortarman on the Eastern Front. However, he was soon allowed to switch to become a sniper and placed in brief sniper training.

Passar went on to participate in the Battle of Stalingrad starting in July 1942, where he became one of the best snipers. By early September 1942, he was credited with taking out 56 enemy combatants, having adopted a daily routine of stalking potential targets in his trench from dawn to dusk. Later that month, on 28 September, he celebrated his 100th kill, noting the date in his diary. By November, he increased his tally to 152 kills, and despite being wounded in battle in December, he remained on the front lines.

Passar's photo and descriptions of his accomplishments as a sniper were featured in several wartime newspaper issues including Pravda, Komsomolskaya Pravda, and Krasnaya Armiya. After the publicity, the German Army put a bounty of 100,000 marks for his death. In addition to his regular sniper duties, he also trained other snipers, three of whom went on to tally over 100 kills each before his death.

On 22 January 1943, Passar was killed in action while taking out machine gun crews and was buried in the mass grave in Gorodishche. His tally at the time of his death 237 enemy soldiers killed.

A memorial marker with Passar's name on the grave site mistakenly labeled him as a Hero of the Soviet Union, even though his nomination for the title in February 1943 was reduced to the Order of the Red Banner. His comrades from the war petitioned for him to receive the title later, but it was never awarded. He was eventually made a Hero of the Russian Federation on 16 February 2010.

== Awards ==
- Hero of the Russian Federation (16 February 2010)
- Two Orders of the Red Banner (17 October 1942 and 23 April 1943)

== See also ==
- List of Heroes of the Russian Federation
