= Dersu Uzala (book) =

1923 book by Vladimir Arsenyev

- English-language edition cover, featuring a photo from the 1975 film adaptation
- Author: V. K. Arseniev
- Language: English
- Subject: Travelogue
- Publisher: McPherson
- Publication date: October 1996
- Publication place: United States
- ISBN: 978-0-929701-49-3

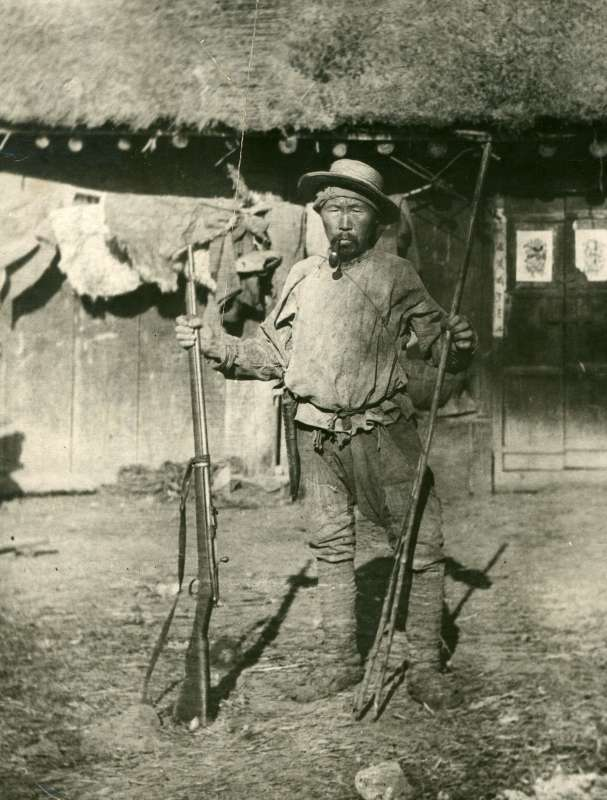
Dersu Uzala (1906). Photo by V. Arsenyev

Dersu Uzala (Russian: Дерсу Узала; alternate U.S. titles: With Dersu the Hunter and Dersu the Trapper) is a 1923 memoir by the Russian explorer Vladimir Arsenyev, concerning his travels in the Russian Far East with the Nanai hunter Dersu Uzala.

The story was made into a 1975 film Dersu Uzala, directed by Akira Kurosawa.

The film became only the second from Russia to win the Academy Award for Best Foreign Language Film, after War and Peace (1966–1967).

== Synopsis ==
Arsenyev tells of his travels in the Ussuri basin in the Russian Far East. Dersu Uzala (c. 1849 – 1908) was a Goldi hunter who acted as a guide for Arsenyev's surveying crew mapping the taiga from 1902 to 1907 and saved them from starvation and cold. Arsenyev portrays him as a simple yet great man, an animist who sees animals and plants as equal to man. From 1907, Arsenyev invited Dersu to live in his house in Khabarovsk as Dersu's failing sight hampered his ability to live as a hunter. In the spring of 1908, Dersu grew discontent with city life and bade farewell to Arsenyev, walking back toward his home in the woods of the Primorsky Krai; he was killed before he could reach them, near the town of Korfovskiy. He was killed in his sleep and the thieves had stolen his Berdianka. As opposed to the film, Dersu Uzala, Arsenyev had not given him a highly valuable latest model Russian military rifle as a parting gift, causing Arsenyev to feel guilty. Rather, the focus in the book was on the ills of civilization. He was buried in a hastily dug, unmarked grave next to two large cedar trees. Several years later, on another expedition, Arsenyev returned to Korfovskaya but could not find the grave due to the construction of a new quarry and town.

== Historical accuracy ==
According to Arsenyev's diary, he met the historical Dersu in 1906, not 1902. It appears that the Dersu character is a composite of several trappers who Arsenyev met during his expedition. In reality, although Arsenyev was heartbroken by Dersu's murder, he was unable to find his grave.

== Editions in Russian ==
- Дерсу Узала. Сквозь тайгу Издательство: Терра - Книжный клуб (1997) Н. Е. Кабанова (ed.) ISBN 9785300010973 (English: Dersu Uzala. Taiga Publishing House: Terra Book Club) (1997) N. ya. Kabanov (ed.) ISBN 9785300010973)

== English translations ==
- Dersu the Trapper, translated by Malcolm Burr from the heavily redacted 1926 edition V debryakh Ussuriyskogo kraya (In the wilds of the Ussuri krai)
  - Pub: Secker & Warburg, London 1939. First English edition.
  - Pub: E. P. Dutton & Co., Inc. New York: 1941. ISBN 0-929701-49-6 First American edition.
  - Pub: McPherson and others, 1996, 2001. ISBN 0-929701-49-6. Mass market paperback.
- Dersu Uzala, translated by Victor Shneerson from the heavily redacted 1944 edition Dersu Uzala
  - Pub: Foreign Languages Publishing House, Moscow, ca 1950
  - Pub: Raduga Publishers, Moscow 1990, ISBN 5-05-002822-1
  - Pub: University Press of the Pacific 2004 ISBN 1-4102-1347-1
- With Dersu the Hunter: Adventures in the Taiga, adapted by Anne Terry White. A shortened version of Shneerson's 1950 translation.
  - Pub: George Braziller 1965, A Venture Book, New York. ISBN 0-8076-0325-2

== Film adaptations ==
- (1961) Dersu Uzala (Дерсу Узала) Soviet Union, director Agasi Babayan
- (1975) Dersu Uzala (Дерсу Узала) Soviet Union/Japan, director Akira Kurosawa
