= Dersu Uzala (1975 film) =

1975 film by Akira Kurosawa

Dersu Uzala Дерсу Узала デルス·ウザーラ
- Japanese release poster
- Directed by: Akira Kurosawa
- Screenplay by: Akira Kurosawa; Yuri Nagibin
- Based on: Dersu Uzala by Vladimir Arsenyev
- Produced by: Yoichi Matsue; Nikolai Sizov
- Starring: Maxim Munzuk; Yury Solomin
- Cinematography: Asakazu Nakai; Yuri Gantman; Fyodor Dobronravov
- Edited by: Akira Kurosawa; Lyudmila Feriginova
- Music by: Isaak Shvarts
- Production companies: Daiei Film; Mosfilm
- Distributed by: Mosfilm (USSR); Daiei Film (Japan); New World Pictures (USA)
- Release dates: July 1975 (USSR); 2 August 1975 (Japan)
- Running time: 141 minutes
- Countries: Soviet Union; Japan
- Language: Russian
- Budget: $4 million (est.)
- Box office: 21 million tickets (USSR/EU); $1.2 million (USA/Canada)

Dersu Uzala (Russian: Дерсу Узала; Japanese: デルス·ウザーラ, romanized: Derusu Uzāra; alternative U.S. title: Dersu Uzala: The Hunter) is a 1975 epic biographical film directed and co-written by Akira Kurosawa. Starring Maxim Munzuk and Yury Solomin, the film is based on the 1923 memoir (named for the native trapper Dersu Uzala) by Russian explorer Vladimir Arsenyev, about his exploration of the Russian Far East over the course of multiple expeditions in the early 20th century. During his exploration, he forms a deep friendship with Dersu as the trapper helps him navigate through the taiga.

Following a series of personal and professional difficulties, Kurosawa was approached by the Soviet Union in 1972 with an offer to produce a film there. A contract with Mosfilm was signed in March 1973, and production began in 1974. The Soviet side of production had requests and stipulations, including a limit to the number of Japanese crew members, but it was agreed that Kurosawa would maintain full artistic control. Shot on 70 mm film, the production of Dersu Uzala experienced difficult conditions, including illness, freezing temperatures, and difficulties filming planned shoots. Filming ended in the Russian Far East in January 1975, after eight months in the wilderness, before wrapping in April of that year in Moscow. The estimated cost of production was $4 million.

Dersu Uzala had its premiere at the 9th Moscow International Film Festival in 1975, before being released widely in Japan in August, and the Soviet Union in September. The film's release coincided with Kurosawa beginning to form a public image, as he found himself without an income. Screened in United States in February 1976, the film went on to win Academy Award for Best Foreign Language Film before seeing a limited release in December 1977. In the US the film saw a mixed reception. Many scholars and critics, even those who had supported Kurosawa's earlier work, disliked the film. Academic analyses of the film have looked at the characterisation of Dersu and the relationship between nature and civilisation.

== Plot ==
In the early 20th century, Captain Arsenyev embarks on a topographic surveying expedition in the Shkotovo region of the Ussuri territory. During the journey, he encounters Dersu Uzala, a nomadic Nanai hunter who impresses him with his exceptional wilderness skills. Dersu agrees to become their guide, leading the expedition through the rugged frontier.

Dersu earns the respect of the group with his experience, instincts, keen observation, and compassion. He showcases his resourcefulness by repairing an abandoned hut and leaving essential provisions for future travelers. As the expedition progresses, Arsenyev and Dersu venture alone to explore Lake Khanka but are caught in a blizzard. Dersu saves Arsenyev’s life by building a shelter and tending to him throughout the night.

The party faces numerous hardships, including fatigue and starvation, but Dersu’s wisdom and skills help them survive. Eventually, they encounter a Chinese family who offers them food, warmth, and hospitality. When the expedition nears its end, Arsenyev invites Dersu to accompany him back to Khabarovsk. However, Dersu, feeling his place is in the forest, declines the offer, asking only for rifle cartridges.

Five years later, Arsenyev embarks on another expedition, hoping to reunite with Dersu. Eventually, they meet again, and Dersu agrees to guide the party once more. During the journey, Arsenyev and Dersu face a perilous situation when they become stranded on a raft heading toward treacherous rapids. Dersu pushes Arsenyev off the raft to safety but remains trapped as the raft is swept toward the rapids. Dersu leaps from the raft and clings to a tree branch, then directs Arsenyev and the others to fell a tree that enables him to reach the riverbank.

As time passes, Dersu senses they are being stalked by a Siberian tiger. He warns the tiger to leave, but eventually shoots and mortally wounds it. Believing that Kanga, the spirit of the forest, will punish him, Dersu becomes increasingly fearful and troubled. Later, his eyesight begins to fail, leaving him unable to hunt reliably and survive alone in the wilderness. Arsenyev invites him to live with his family in Khabarovsk, but Dersu struggles to adapt to city life, feeling confined and out of place. He eventually tells the family he must return to the mountains. Though saddened, Arsenyev understands and gives Dersu a new high-powered rifle to improve his chances of survival.

Later, Arsenyev receives news that the body of an unidentified Nanai hunter has been found and is asked to identify it. He recognises the body as Dersu’s and becomes upset. The official speculates that Dersu may have been killed for the rifle Arsenyev had given him. At Dersu’s burial, Arsenyev plants his walking stick beside the grave as a symbol of remembrance.

== Cast ==
- Yury Solomin as Vladimir Arsenyev
- Maxim Munzuk as Dersu Uzala
- Vladimir Kremena as Turtygin
- Alexander Pyatkov as Olenev
- Svetlana Danilchenko as Anna
- Suimenkul Chokmorov as Chzhan Bao

== Production ==
=== Background ===
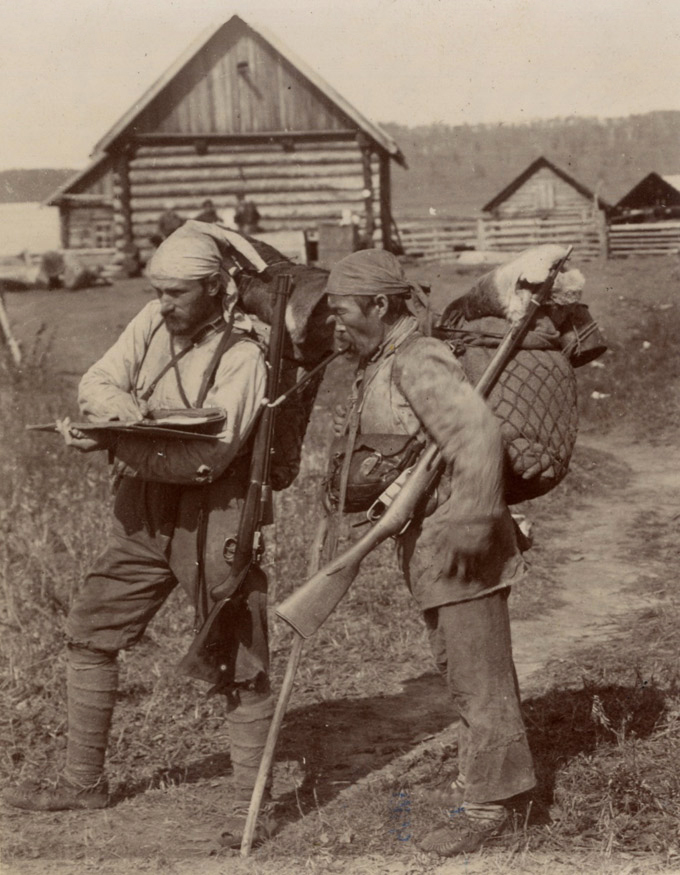
The historical Vladimir Arsenyev and Dersu Uzala in 1906

Akira Kurosawa had first thought of adapting Arsenyev's book Dersu Uzala (an autobiography of Arsenyev's time exploring the Russian Far East) during his days as an assistant director. After completing his film The Idiot (1951), he asked Eijirō Hisaita to help draft a script. This script adapted the setting to Japan—making Dersu Uzala an Orok native of Hokkaido—but Kurosawa believed the script was uninteresting and that the relocation to Japan did not work well, so the project was abandoned. In 1971, there was interest in Kurosawa shooting a film in the Soviet Union, but it was while Kurosawa later promoted Dodes'ka-den (1970) at the Moscow Film Festival that serious discussions were had regarding a new production. In December of that year, Kurosawa attempted suicide during a difficult period in his career, questioning his creative ability after the commercial failure of Dodes'ka-den and the disastrous production of Tora! Tora! Tora! (1970), and the subsequent denial of funds for his productions by Japanese studios. At this time too, Kurosawa was both mentally and physically unwell. The film historian and biographer Donald Richie writes that Kurosawa also had an unhappy domestic life.

=== Development and pre-production ===
Kurosawa returned to the project of adapting Dersu Uzala in 1972 when the film producer Yoichi Matsue received a communication from the All-Soviet Union of Filmmakers indicating they were committed to a Soviet–Japanese production. Matsue and Kurosawa's script advisor, Teruyo Nogami, flew to Moscow in early 1973 to sign a production agreement stipulating that although it would be a Soviet production, Kurosawa would maintain full artistic control. Nogami states that originally, the Soviet side wanted Toshiro Mifune to be cast in the role of Arsenyev, but Matsue persuaded them that Mifune would not stay in Siberia for a shoot lasting for years. The film scholar Stuart Galbraith IV references Variety articles that indicated that Kurosawa had wanted to work with Mifune again, including claims from the magazine that he may still be cast even after Yury Solomin was hired for the role. Mifune's son later said that Kurosawa asked Mifune to film with him, and while Mifune was eager to, he was struggling financially and could not afford a prolonged shoot. Kurosawa signed a contract with Mosfilm on 14 March 1973; the conglomerate Nippon Herald came into the production as an investor in return for distribution rights in Japan.

Kurosawa sent a scenario to the Soviet Union but the Soviet draft written by Yuri Nagibin had changed details to include more action scenes. At a conference in October, it was decided that production would proceed based on Kurosawa's draft. Kurosawa and Nagibin worked together and cut much from Kurosawa's earlier drafts that focused on existential questions of life which Kurosawa wrote after the commercial failure of Dodes'ka-den. There were stipulations made by the Soviet side to limit the number of Japanese crew. In addition to Kurosawa, Nogami, and Matsue, Kurosawa brought his long-time collaborator Asakazu Nakai and two assistant directors: Norio Minoshima, and Tamotsu Kawasaki. Kawasaki was requested by the Soviet side because he was fluent in Russian, but he later left the production in the winter of 1974 due to difficulties between the Japanese and Soviet crew members.

During their time in the Soviet Union, the Japanese crew were closely monitored by state police, but were given access to locations in Primorsky that were usually forbidden for foreigners to visit. Soviet production quotas required a minimum length of film to be shot each day which initially caused friction between Nogami and the Soviet staff, but after comparing the two systems of planning they discovered the schedule was similar. Due to a lack of impressive actors, screen tests for the role of Arsenyev and Dersu were prolonged. Even after Solomin and Munzuk were chosen, screen tests continued to be conducted until they were formally given the role on 1 February 1974.

=== Filming ===
Filming of Dersu Uzala began in February 1974. (Note: According to Teruyo Nogami, shooting in Siberia did not begin until 27 May 1974.) The film used Sovscope 70 cameras. These cameras used film stock at a speed of ASA 40 (according to Nogami, the Japanese industry used film stock at a sensitivity of ASA 100–120). The film stock was low quality and the cameras required three men to move them. This led to issues when locations became too warm or too cold as the film would swell or the cameras would stop working. On the shoot there were five Japanese members and seventy Soviets, with an additional thirty soldiers on work detail. Kurosawa maintained a good relationship with the Soviet crew, with many of them in turn admiring the director and Nakai, the cinematographer. The crew began to move in teams to Siberia, with Kurosawa and Nogami leaving Moscow for Khabarovsk on the 8 May before travelling by train to Arsenyev (named after the film's protagonist). Conditions during production were harsh. When shooting began in the taiga, the crew were beset by the summer heat, mosquitoes, and ticks. Temperatures dropped to minus forty degrees and Kurosawa and Nakai suffered from sickness, with Kurosawa developing frostbite.

During preparations for a night shoot, Kurosawa directed the crew to hose down trees to form icicles and hang bottles from the branches, so that the resulting sound coming from the objects hitting each other would create a mysterious atmosphere when combined with the image of Dersu expressing his fears next to a campfire. However, after they began hosing down the trees, the water in the hosepipe froze. The propeller of an old aeroplane was used for the effect of wind. Despite accompanying the crew for eight months for one job, the engine would not start due to the cold. After two hours, the plane's engine caught fire and the shoot had to be cancelled. Whenever a blizzard was needed for the shoot, precreated piles of snow were tossed in the air by shovels in front of a fan. Kurosawa initially wanted to use a wild tiger for certain scenes, but the process of capturing the animal and persuading it to follow stage directions proved impossible. The tiger collapsed, Solomin complained about the animal's treatment and Kurosawa called the shoot off. When they returned to Moscow an old circus tiger was used to complete the scenes.

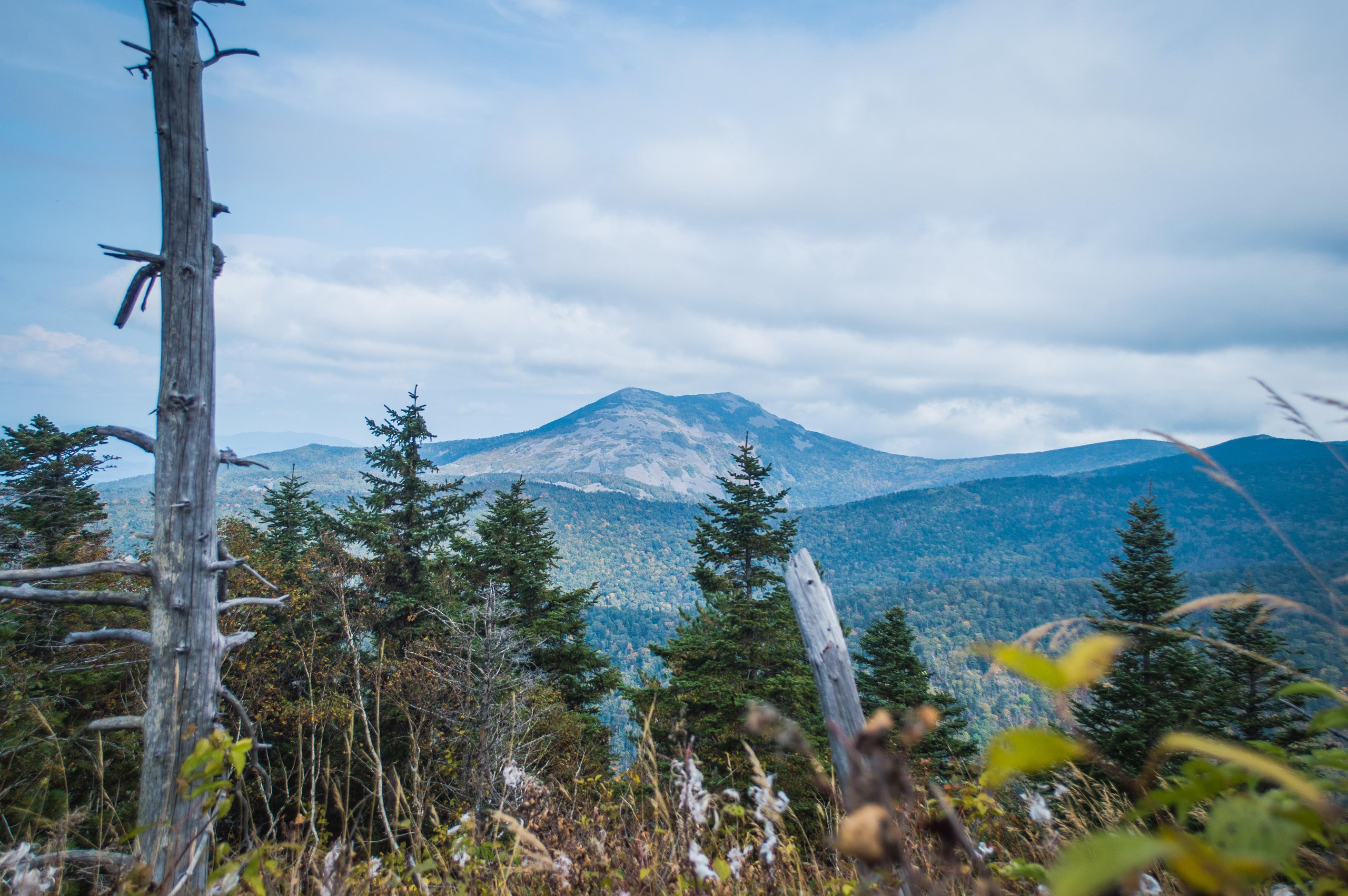
During a low point in production Kurosawa was unable to fully realise his vision on Mt. Falaza (pictured).

Originally the plan had been for location shooting to finish before the end of the year. It was decided that only the reshoots and scenes absolutely necessary to be shot in Arsenyev would be filmed on location, with the rest filmed in Moscow. Under pressure from the Soviet producers, January 1975 was a difficult moment for the crew as Kurosawa became sleepless and drank heavily. He and Nakai argued over filming arrangements, and a particularly difficult mountain shoot failed to be properly realised. The crew returned to Moscow on 18 January, Kurosawa became angry regularly as filming continued and he became more exhausted. Filming wrapped on 28 April 1975.

=== Editing and post-production ===
During filming, Kurosawa would send rushes to be developed overnight, but was upset by a decision made to punch holes in the middle of the film which contained processing streaks or emulsions, rendering it unusable. He edited the film at Mosfilm's studios in collaboration with Andrei Tarkovsky's regular collaborator, Lyudmila Feiginova. Kurosawa initially thought to hire Masaru Sato to compose music for the film, but decided to use a Russian composer instead. After watching several Soviet films and conferring with his collaborators, he hired Isaac Schwartz. The film was completed and Kurosawa returned to Japan in mid-June. The runtime of the film is 141 minutes. As production was ending, Chinese officials charged the film with anti-Chinese sentiment; Kurosawa contested this characterisation, but did have difficulty writing the parts of the film's Chinese characters. Galbraith notes that by the time of its completion, the estimated cost of production was $4 million, but that differences in production and bookkeeping methods have obscured a more precise figure. (Note: Equivalent to $23,933,210 in 2025)

== Themes ==
=== Nature and civilisation ===
The film's colour design and use of weather is naturalistic. The film historian Donald Richie, writing in an updated 1998 revision of The Films of Akira Kurosawa (1965), describes Dersu Uzala's main character as being nature itself. To him, the characters are diminished (to the film's detriment) and subordinated to the power of nature. For the critic and historian Stuart Galbraith IV, Dersu Uzala depicts the duality of nature, at once both beautiful and dangerous. The film scholar James Goodwin sees nature's impact on the film as an "existential stage" for the dramatic realisation of character. In Mitsuhiro Yoshimoto's academic monograph on Kurosawa, he interprets the film's presentation of nature as one that is awe-inspiring with an authenticity seen from the perspective of the characters, and which is imbued with a physical power which he refers to as, "the source of our life and death". Writing in The Warrior's Camera (1991), the film theorist Stephen Prince considers the world of Dersu Uzala to be an "arcadian paradise" that, along with his other late-period films, reflects Kurosawa's move away from the real spaces of politics and humanistic values into the world of legends and the past.

The historian David Conrad notes the film's racial differences in conducting explorative missions to colonise the east of Russia. To him, the film reflects the 20th century Japanese experience that saw Japan use modern technology to engage in an imperialist campaign in Asia, while also reflecting the experience of postwar Japan as a formerly-occupied country acting as an observer to Cold War politics. Yoshimoto contrasts Arsenyev and Dersu; the former is creating a map which can be read by anyone via simple universal symbols, whereas for Derzu, the forest itself contains meaning, his own mapping requires extensive understanding of the forest. As a result, Arsenyev's cartography objectifies the forest by allowing Russian settlers to read and change the landscape, such that the film comments on its own representation of the wilderness.

Arsenyev (left) and Dersu (right) framed between celestial objects

One shot which sees Dersu and Arsenyev standing in the centre flanked on each side by the moon and the sun is viewed by Richie as an all-encompassing perspective of nature, with the film's depiction of the natural world informed by a richness of colour and human insignificance. For Galbraith, this shot embodies the duality of nature and its overwhelming power in comparison to the small figures of the characters. The framing of characters with the sun and the moon flattens the space that they occupy. To Prince, this framing represents the serenity and balance in nature and a cosmological truth that personifies elemental forces. In analysing the image, Hamner sees the moon as an image of the nostalgic past that is inescapably connected to the present (embodied in the sun). As the sun (the present) sets, the moon reflects the light of the present through nostalgia, creating future memories and questioning divisions within life and humanity's reified perception of nature.

Richie reads the film's enamoured depiction of nature as Kurosawa's rejection of Japanese society's lack of spiritual progression. Conrad views Dersu's animistic spirituality as a form of purpose, that his environmental consciousness reflects the beauty and danger of human's relationship with the natural world. Richie analyses Dersu's shot at the tiger, a sacred animal to Dersu (and therefore unnatural to him), as the result of corruption from his association with the soldiers. To Prince, the film's structure (by framing the story around Dersu's death) and uses of long takes and telephoto lenses builds a picture of immobility that constricts the protagonist's freedom within nature. However, by way of focusing the narrative on Arsenyev's experience with Dersu, the film also immortalises his example away from encroaching modernisation.

Prince recognises in Dersu's relationship with nature a balance that is reflected in the character's experience of time. In one scene, the Russian soldiers mock Dersu for repairing and providing food for a small hut for the next people who need shelter; Prince sees in this perspective a linear relationship with time and space (with the soldiers living in the present and moving towards a modernised future), while Dersu is able to understand the importance of cooperation by helping out people in the future just as others helped them in the past. The philosopher Gilles Deleuze comments in his book, Cinema 1: The Movement Image (1986), on the role of Dersu as a master of the forest who "slips into the state of shadow" when he loses his capability to interact with nature. By shadow, Deleuze refers to someone who only absorbs situations. To Deleuze, the scene where Dersu prepares a small hut with provisions for the next travellers is a process of renewal in the natural world that creates new situations for people to connect through and interpret. By acting in and absorbing these new situations, when Dersu dies the world of Kurosawa's film has been affected by the circulation of life he created.

=== Characterisation of Dersu ===
Richie sees in the man of Dersu an analogue to Kurosawa himself. (A characterisation that professor of English Joan Mellen agrees with and that Galbraith contests.) He sees the character as beset by an encroaching civilisation while his knowledge is useless and outmoded to the younger men in his society, supplanted by the modernising settlers. To Richie, Dersu embodies the philosopher Jean-Jacques Rousseau's idea of the natural man, but the scholar criticises Kurosawa's characterisation of him in the film as being too sentimental and unambiguously noble.

Prince writes that the relationship between Dersu and Arsenyev is similar to a master-pupil relationship (albeit a failed one), drawing on Zen Buddhist principles expounded by Dōgen that teach self-reliance and focus on one's inner life by learning through experience. Richie sees the relationship between Dersu and Arsenyev as homoerotic but uncritically militaristic, loving, but based on a respect for authority and the subordination of individuals to a higher purpose. Physically, Richie comments that Dersu's smaller stature and knowledge of nature places him at odds with the taller European Russians who can not traverse the taiga. It presents a different image of racialised masculinity that challenges western myths of the frontier (embodied in folk heroes such as Davy Crockett).

Yoshimoto comments on how the film's structure frames the film between two acts of remembrance for Dersu, that the film is told in flashback from a point in 1910 where Arsenyev is searching for his grave, and that it ends in 1907 with the grave being dug in the forest. Goodwin likewise sees the structure as being a frame for Dersu's life, but specifically notes how these bookends reference his death as a result of modernisation. He sees this social change to be a reflection of Kurosawa's own historical pessimism. To Conrad, the beginning of the film reflects the contemporary Japanese migration from rural to urban areas, where in the process, people stopped maintaining their family's graves. The increase in abandoned graves saw many of them dismantled. Arsenyev's failure to find his friend's grave emerges from a similar anxiety about loss of spirituality in the process of modernisation.

== Release ==
=== Theatrical ===
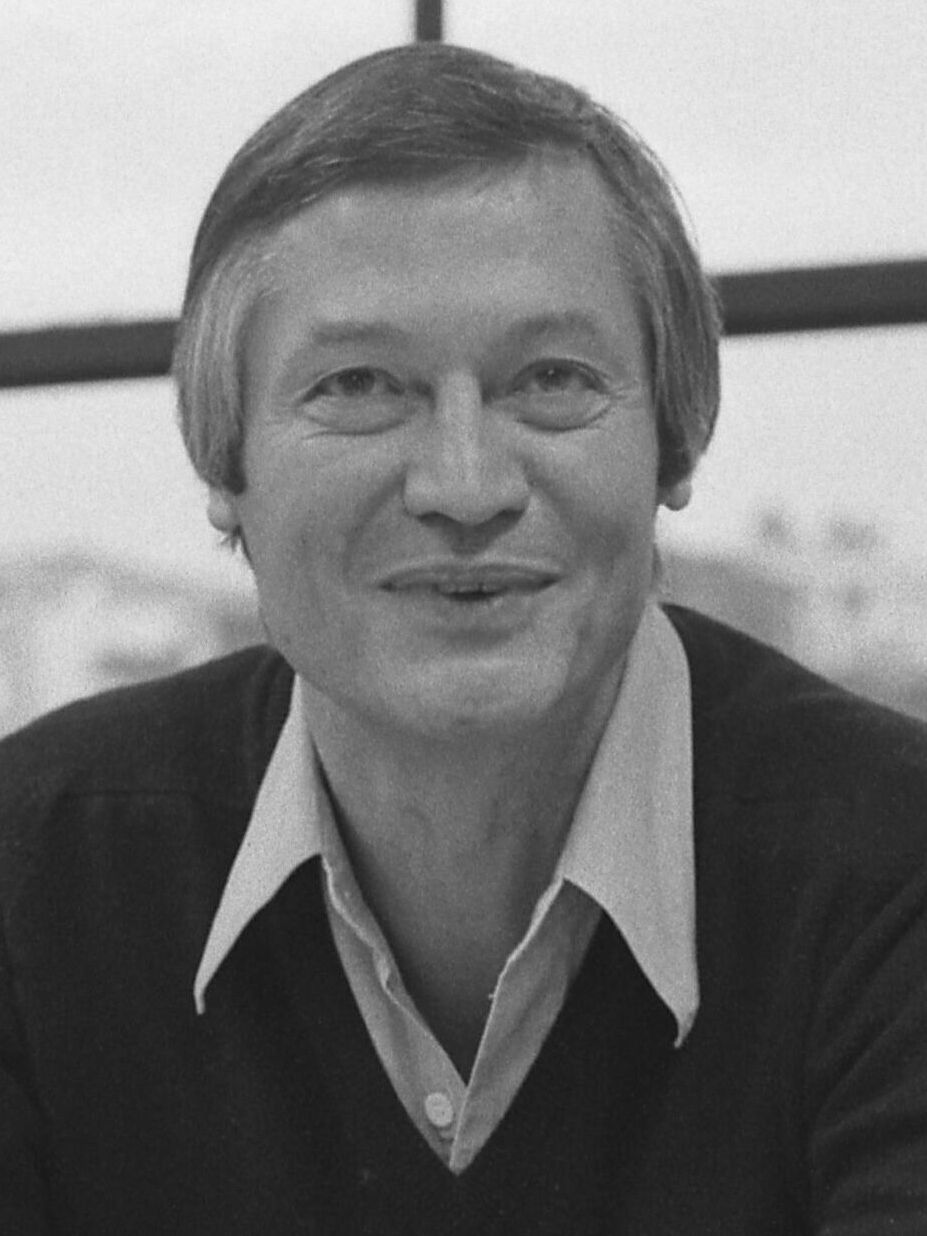
Roger Corman's (pictured in 1978) company New World Pictures purchased the rights to distribute the film in the US.

Dersu Uzala was shown at the 9th Moscow International Film Festival in 1975. (Note: Galbraith writes that the film was shown there on 12 August 1975. According to the official website for the Moscow International Film Festival, screenings ended on 23 July 1975.) The film was released in Japan on 2 August and the Soviet Union in September of that year. The film had its first run in Japan in an up-market cinema in Ginza. Following the release of the film, Kurosawa became more accessible to the mass media, cultivating a public image and appearing in an advertisement for Suntory whiskey. His director's compensation came in lower than expected, leaving him without income until he started producing his next film, Kagemusha. Some people in Japan reacted negatively to this change, with some insulted by the fact that in order to continue making films he went to the Soviet Union. Kurosawa was initially satisfied with his collaboration with the Soviet Union until it emerged in November 1976 that an Italian print had cut the length of the film down to two hours and recomposed the score with permission from the Soviet international distribution company Sovexport. In Frankfurt for the German premiere for the film, he vowed not to work with the Soviet Union again. Eventually the film was released in Italy in Kurosawa's intended version.

The film had its US premiere at the Samuel Goldwyn Theater on 8 February 1976 for Academy Award consideration. On 30 March, the day following Dersu Uzala's Academy Award win, it was screened at the Los Angeles International Film Exposition. On 5 October, the film was shown at the 1976 New York Film Festival. Roger Corman's distribution company New World Pictures made an agreement with a group of New York investors to purchase the rights to distribute the film in the US and Canada in September, with plans to open the film in January 1977. The investors had purchased the rights to the film as part of a tax shelter scheme, but with changes to the federal tax code, they decided to sell to Corman and New World. When the Soviets found out about this deal they asked for a larger advance, a deal was eventually negotiated where New World would relinquish distribution rights in Canada and pay the original advance. The film released publicly in the US on 22 December 1977 on 35 mm prints and monophonic sound. Galbraith credits this downgrade in picture and sound quality for its lower critical reception.

=== Home media ===
A VHS version of the film was released by Kino and Connoisseur Films, with a DVD distributed by Image Entertainment. Another DVD version was released by Artificial Eye. In Russia, a DVD version of the film was released in 2001. A Blu-ray was released by Imprint Films in 2022 using the film's original soundtrack. Included is an audio commentary by Galbraith.

== Reception ==
=== Box office ===
Dersu Uzala did well in Japan. Despite its success, the film saw a relatively poor performance. The film sold 20.4 million tickets in the Soviet Union, and made $1.2 million in the United States and Canada. At a re-release in Portugal in 2016, the film grossed $14,480 in total. Since 1996, Dersu Uzala has also sold 48,265 tickets in EU territories.

=== Critical response ===
==== Contemporary opinion ====
On Rotten Tomatoes, the film holds an approval rating of 73% based on 15 reviews, with an average rating of 7.7/10. In Japan, scholars and critics saw Dersu Uzala as a decline in quality compared to his earlier works, many among them having previously championed Kurosawa's films. Joan Mellen and Donald Richie agreed with their assessment. Critics disliked Kurosawa's choice to use 70 mm film as it had associations with light entertainment period films and musicals. In the US the film received a mixed reception.

Writing for Kinema Junpo magazine upon the film's release in Japan, Yūkichi Shinada called Kurosawa's directing orthodox, but praised this decision as the best way to express the feelings of Dersu and Arsenyev for each other and Dersu's way of life. He additionally praised the film for capturing a sense of humanity's cooperation with nature, which is contrasted against Kurosawa's earlier films depicting conflict; as a result Shinada wrote that it reflected a new beginning for Kurosawa's work as a director. Don Kenny wrote in The Japan Times that Dersu Uzala was a great work exemplifying Kurosawa's directorial style, also praising the actors and their casting.

Kevin Thomas believed that Dersu Uzala should have been screened in 70 mm with the correct audio track, but wrote that the film was an achievement. Richard Eder wrote in The New York Times that the film's structure was unbalanced, with the second part being a meaningless extension of the first. In a negative review for The Washington Post, Gary Arnold wrote that the film contains a "picturesque serenity", but that Kurosawa's sensibility as a director was getting slower. A week later Judith Martin wrote a review in the paper panning the film, criticising it for a lack of drama and a pretentious attitude in its praise of Dersu's wisdom. The New Republic and New West were very dismissive of the film, and the Independent Film Journal considered the film's appeal to be very limited. The Monthly Film Bulletin considered the film unsuccessful in its depiction of nature, and generally too sentimental.

==== Retrospective opinion ====
The film was included by the Vatican in a list of forty-five important films compiled in 1995, under the category of "Values". A three out of five star review in Empire criticised Kurosawa's compositions as detached, but complemented the way the environment was filmed. Writing for The Washington Post in 2003, Stephen Hunter called the film a "great epic of physical endurance". Slant Magazine referred to the film in 2010 as a "quiet critique of the artificiality of city life", and wrote appreciatively of its tension. In 2012, Philip French wrote in The Observer that Dersu Uzala was a "humanist masterwork".

=== Awards ===
Kurosawa felt that by winning the Academy Award for Best Foreign Language Film, he was repaying a debt to the Soviet film industry for supporting him. Because the Academy adopted the film as a Soviet movie, he ended up competing against the Japanese film Sandakan No. 8 (1974), directed by Kei Kumai. Kurosawa expressed some regret that he did not win the award with a Japanese film.

Award	Date of ceremony	Category	Recipient(s)	Result	Ref(s)
Moscow International Film Festival	23 July 1975	Golden Prize	Dersu Uzala	Won (Note: Along with The Promised Land and We All Loved Each Other So Much.)	
Moscow International Film Festival	23 July 1975	Prix FIPRESCI	Dersu Uzala	Won	
Academy Awards	29 March 1976	Best Foreign Language Film	Dersu Uzala	Won	
David di Donatello	1977	Best Foreign Director	Akira Kurosawa	Won	
David di Donatello	1977	David Special Award	Mosfilm	Won	
Nastro d'Argento	1977	Director of Best Foreign Film	Akira Kurosawa	Won	

== See also ==
- Dersu Uzala (Russian: Дерсу Узала)—1961 Soviet film directed by Agasi Babayan
- List of submissions to the 48th Academy Awards for Best Foreign Language Film
- List of Soviet submissions for the Academy Award for Best International Feature Film
