= Nanai people =

Tungusic ethnic group of northeast Asia

Nanai
нанай, нани, хэдзэни
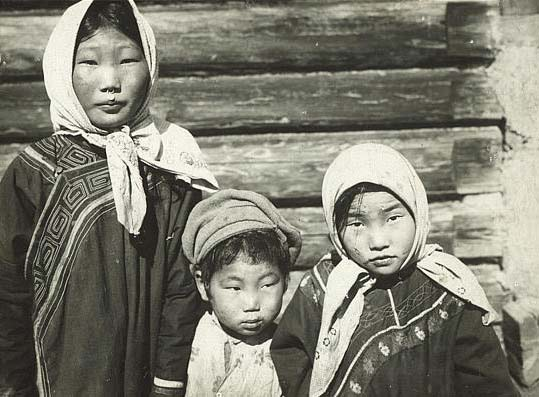
- Nanai children. Girls are in traditional costume "pokto".

Total population
- c. 18,000 (est.)

Regions with significant populations
- Russia, China
- Russia: Khabarovsk Krai: 11,623
- China (Heilongjiang): 5,373

Languages
- Nanai, Kili, Russian (in Russia), Mandarin Chinese (in China)

Religion
- Majority: Shamanism; Minority: Tibetan Buddhism; Russian Orthodoxy

Related ethnic groups
- Evenks, Oroqen, Manchus, Udege, other Tungusic peoples

The Nanai people (Russian: нанайцы, romanized: nanaitsy) are a Tungusic people of East Asia who have traditionally lived along the Amur (Heilongjiang), Songhua (Sunggari) and Ussuri (Wusuli) rivers on the Middle Amur Basin. The ancestors of the Nanai were the Wild Jurchens of northernmost Manchuria, which is now the region of Outer Manchuria in Russia's Far Eastern Federal District.

The Nanai language belongs to the Manchu-Tungusic family. According to the 2010 census, there were 12,003 Nanai in Russia.

== Name ==
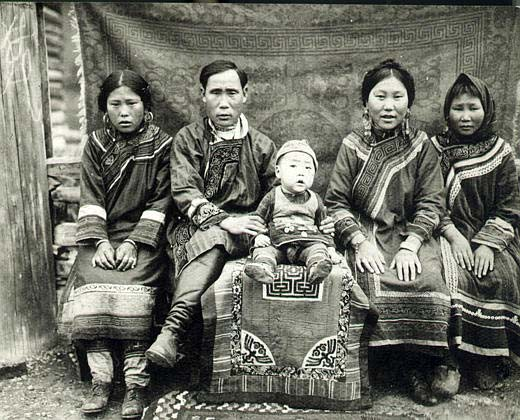
Nanai family, Amur region

Common names for these people include Nanai (Nanai: нанай, нани, [nanai], lit. 'natives, locals, people of the land/earth') and Hezhen (хэдзэни, [χədʑən]; Chinese: 赫哲族; pinyin: Hèzhézú). Other names that have formerly been used to describe the Nanai people include Goldi, Golds, Goldes, and Samagir.

Other autonyms include Qilang ([kilən], lit. 'those who live by the river'; Chinese: 奇楞), [nanio] and [nabəi]. [na] means 'land, earth, ground, country' or, in this context, 'native, local'; [nio], [bəi], or [nai] means 'people' in different dialects.

The Russian linguist L. I. Sem gives the name Hezhe nai (хэǯэ най) or Hezheni (хэǯэны, [xədʑən]) and explains it as the self-name of the Nanai of the lower Amur, meaning 'people who live along the lower course of the river'. It is the source of the Chinese name for the Nanai, Hezhe (Chinese: 赫哲), formerly Heijin (Chinese: 黑斤) and Hezhehala (Chinese: 赫哲哈喇).

== Traditional lifestyle and culture ==
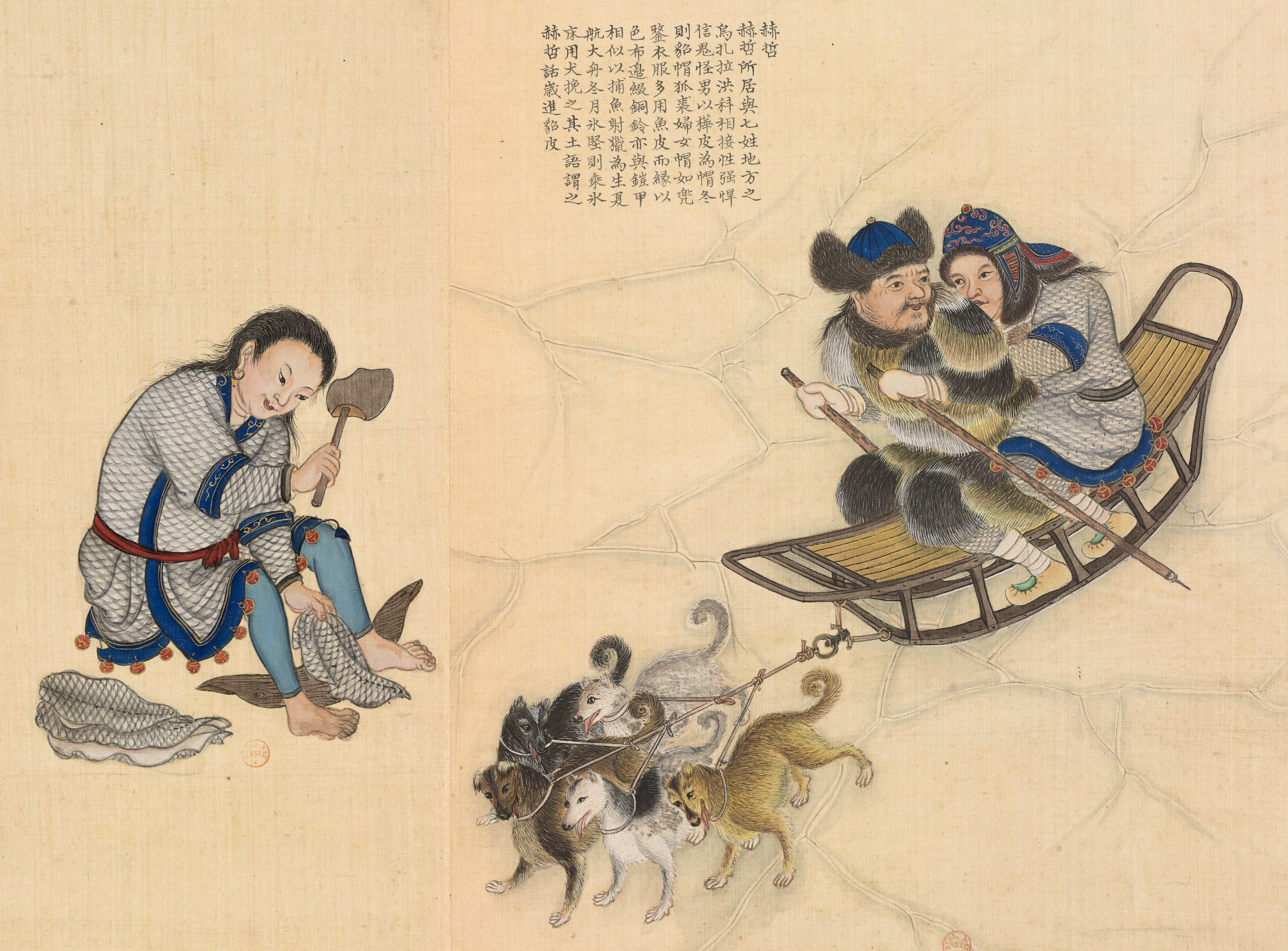
Hezhe people (Chinese: 赫哲), Huang Qing Zhigong Tu, 1769

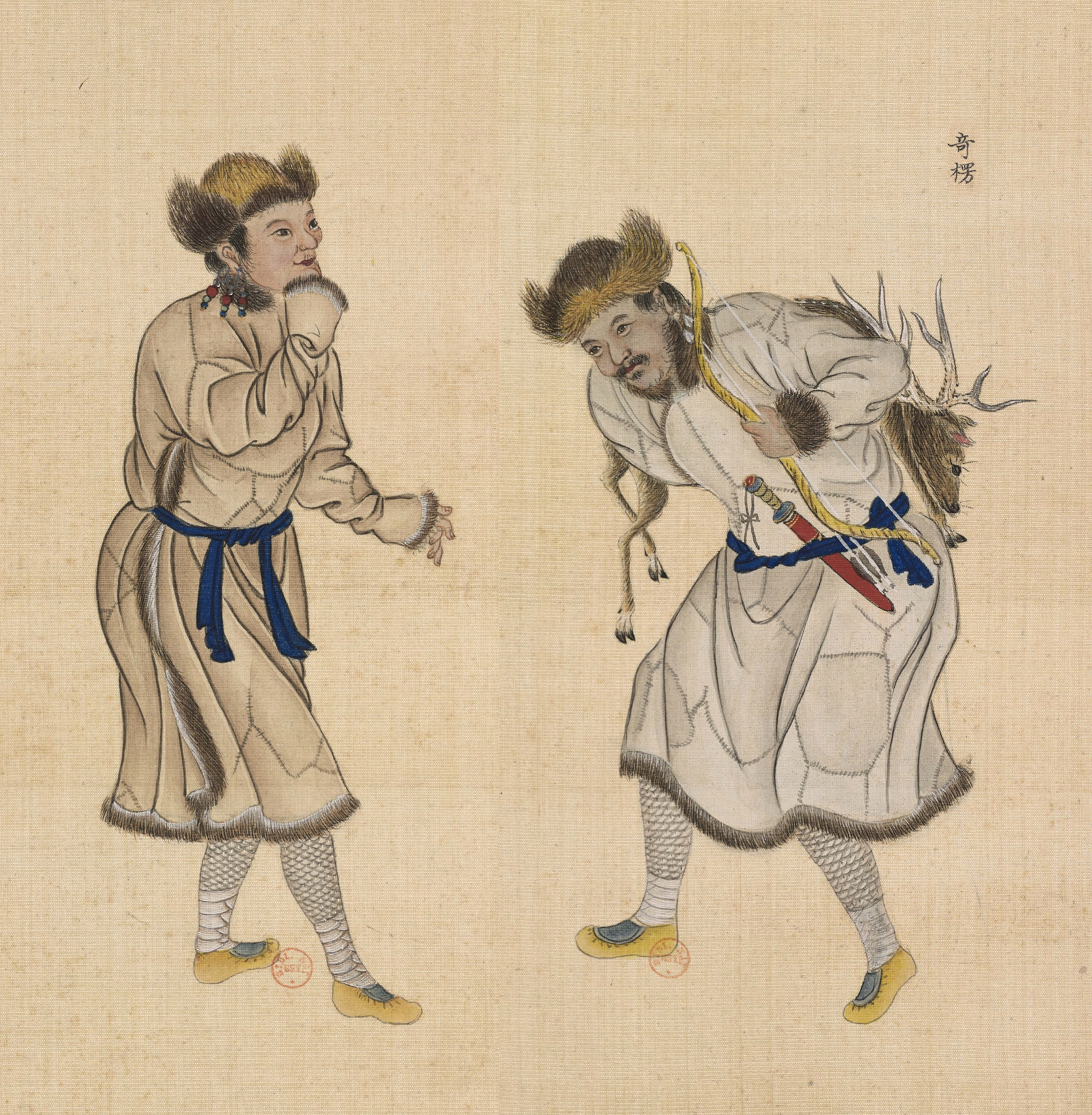
Qilang people (Chinese: 奇楞), Huang Qing Zhigong Tu, 1769

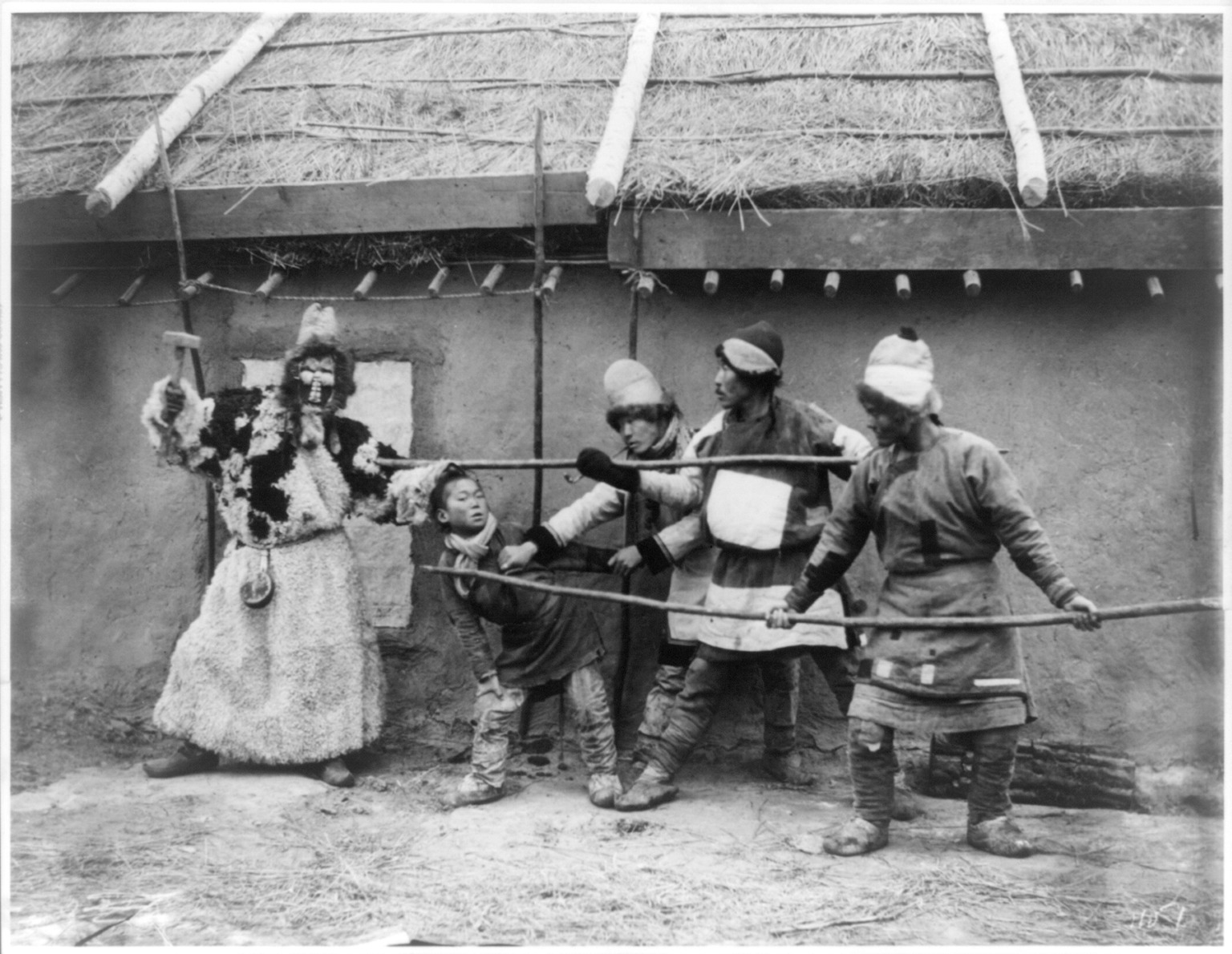
Goldi tribesmen acting out folk drama, "The repulse of the kidnapper" 1895

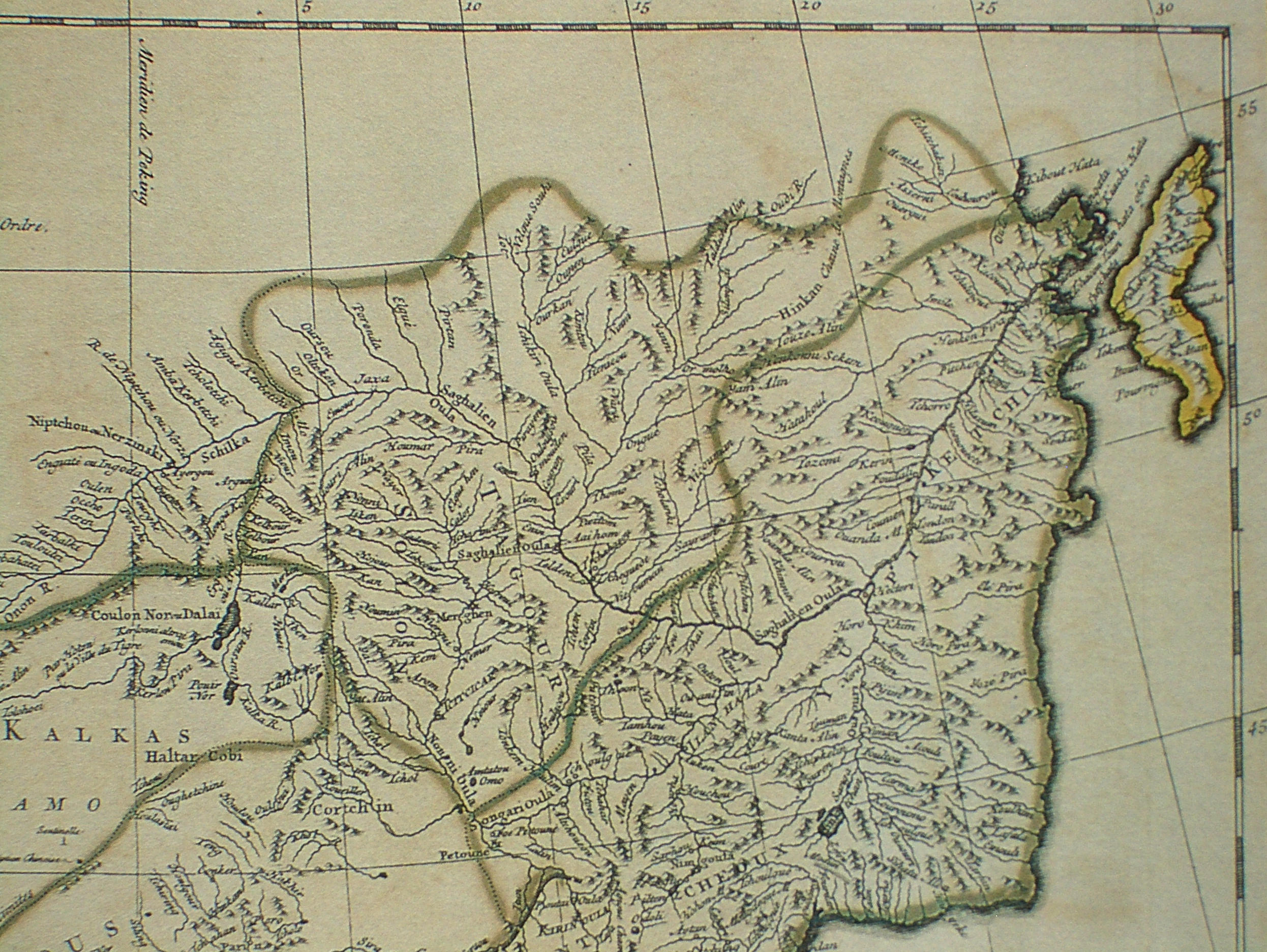
A 1734 French map shows the Yupi people (魚皮; 'fish skin') on both sides of the Ussuri and the Amur south of the mouth of the Dondon (Tondon), and the Ketching people further down the Amur (where Nanai, Ulch, and Nivkh people live now)

Some of the earliest first-hand accounts of the Nanai people in the European languages belong to the French Jesuit geographers travelling on the Ussuri and the Amur in 1709. According to them, the native people living on the Ussuri and on the Amur above the mouth of the Dondon River (which falls into the Amur between today's Khabarovsk and Komsomolsk-on-Amur) were known as Yupi Tartars, while the name of the people living on the Dondon and on the Amur below Dondon was transcribed by the Jesuits into French as Ketching. The latter name may be the French transcription of the reported self-name of the Nanai of the lower Amur, [xədʑən], which was also applied to the closely related Ulch people.

According to the Jesuits, the language of the Yupi people seemed to occupy an intermediate position between the Manchu language and that of the "Ketching" people (Chinese: 盖青; pinyin: Gàiqīng); some level of communication between the Yupi and the Ketching was possible.

Some Han Chinese are said to have founded clan subdivisions among the Nanai, and the Nanai have absorbed Manchu and Jurchens. Nanai culture is influenced by Han Chinese and Manchu culture, and the Nanai share a myth in common with southern Chinese.

The Nanais at first fought against the Nurhaci and the Manchus, led by their own Nanai Hurka chief Sosoku, before surrendering to Hongtaiji in 1631. Mandatory shaving of the front of all male heads was imposed on Amur peoples conquered by the Qing, including the Nanai people. The Amur peoples already wore the queue on the back of their heads but did not shave the front until the Qing subjected them and ordered them to shave. The term "shaved-head people" was used to describe the Nanai by Ulch people.

=== Economy ===
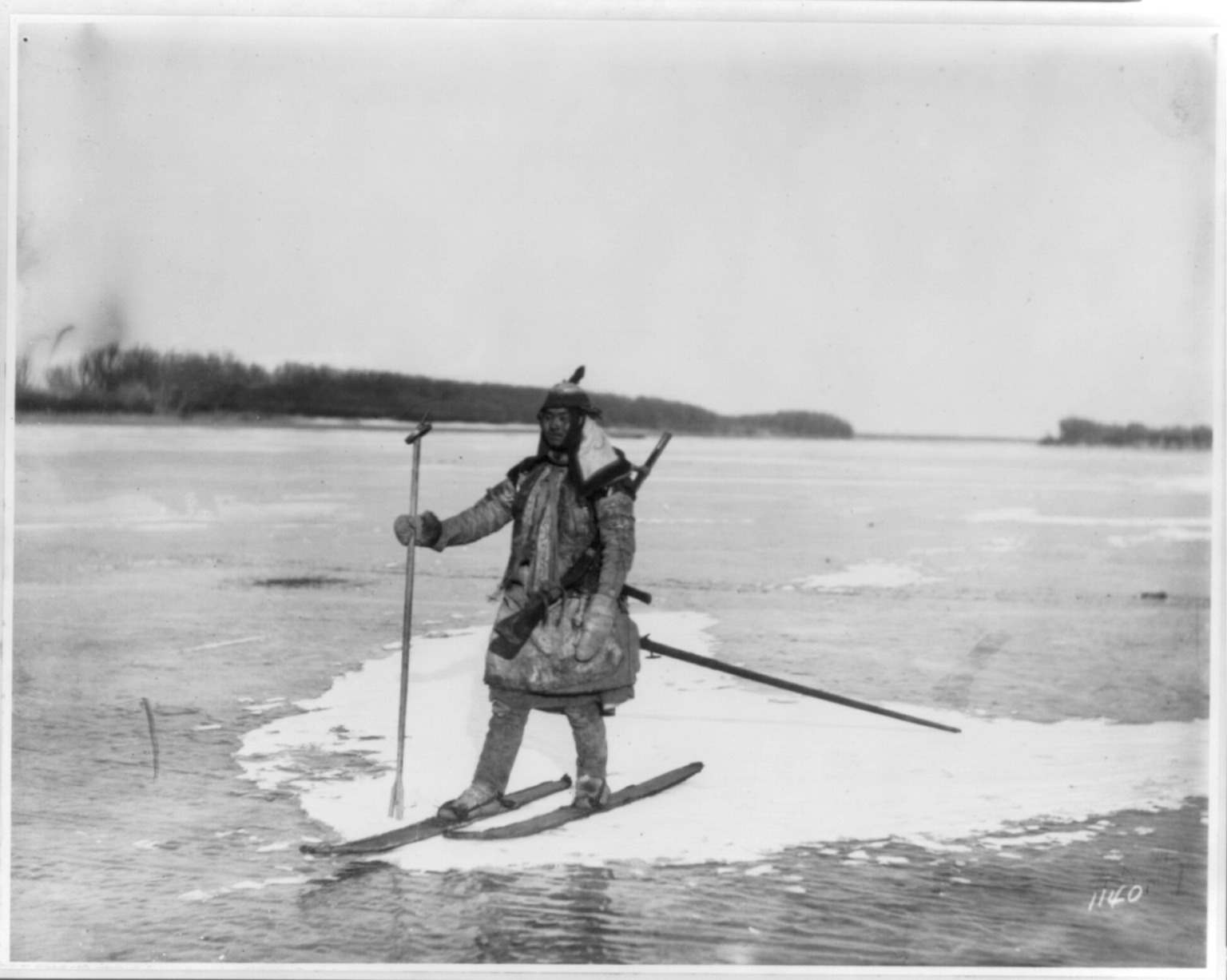
Goldes hunter on skis on ice floe, with spear and rifle, 1895

As described by early visitors (e.g., Jesuit cartographers on the Ussuri River in 1709), the economy of the people living there (who would be classified as Nanai, or possible Udege people, today) was based on fishing. The people lived in villages along the banks of the Ussuri, and spent their entire summers fishing, eating fresh fish in the summer (particularly appreciating the sturgeon), and drying more fish for eating in winter. Fish was used as fodder for those few domestic animals they had (which made the flesh of a locally raised pig almost inedible by visitors with European tastes).

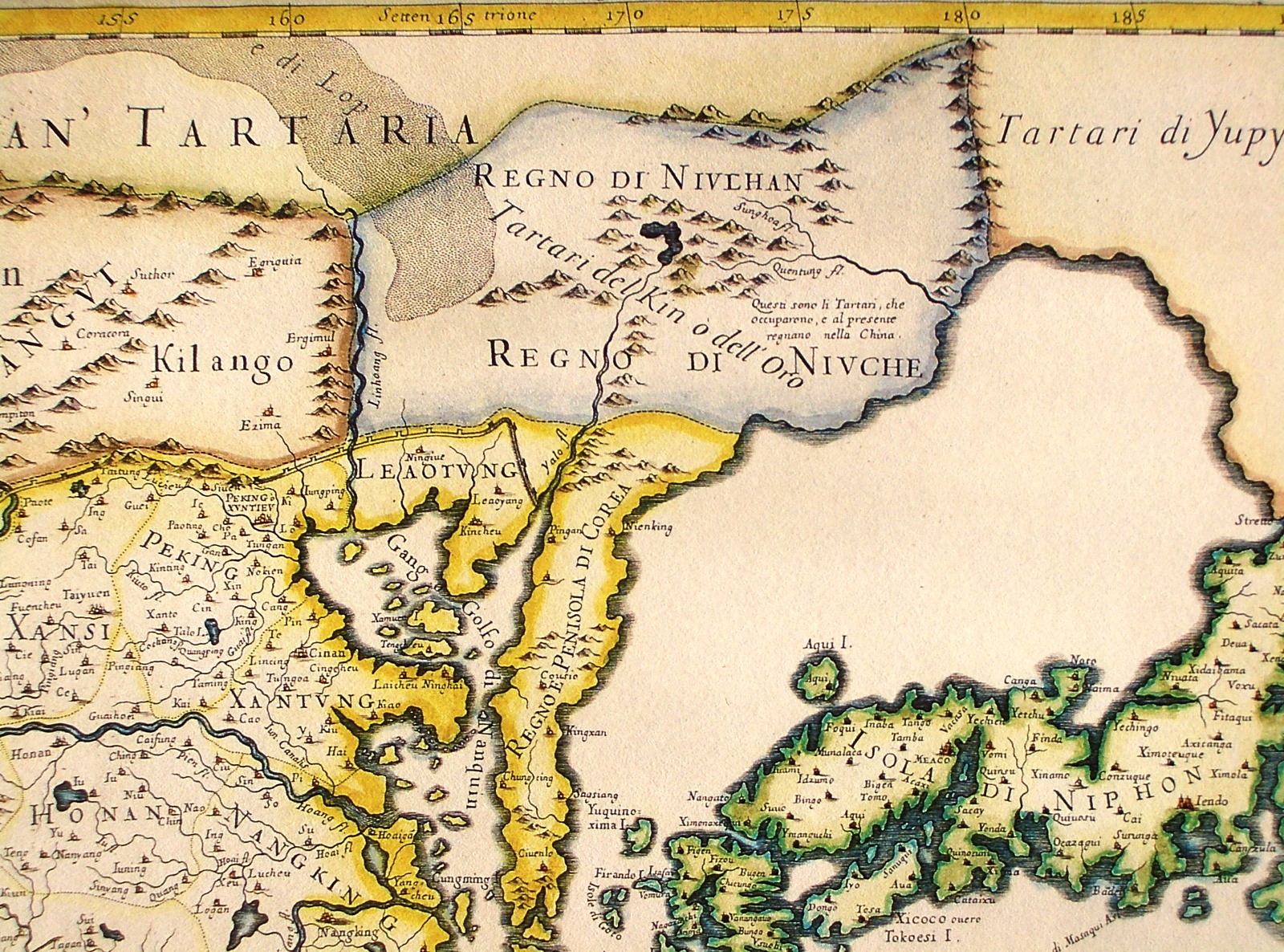
A 1682 published Italian map showing the "Kingdom of the Niuche" (i.e., Jurchen people) or the "Kin (Jin) Tartars", as well as the lands of the "Yupy Tartars" (Nanai and related tribes) further east.

The traditional clothing was made out of fish skins. These skins were left to dry, struck repeatedly with a mallet to leave them completely smooth, and sewn together. The fish chosen to be used were those weighing more than 50 kilograms. In the past centuries, this distinct practice earned the Nanai the name "Fish-skin Tartars" (Chinese: 鱼皮鞑子; pinyin: Yúpí Dázi). This name has also been applied, more generically, to other aboriginal groups of the lower Sungari and lower Amur basins.

Agriculture entered the Nanai lands only slowly. Practically the only crop grown by the Yupi villagers on the Ussuri River shores in 1709 was some tobacco.

=== Religion ===
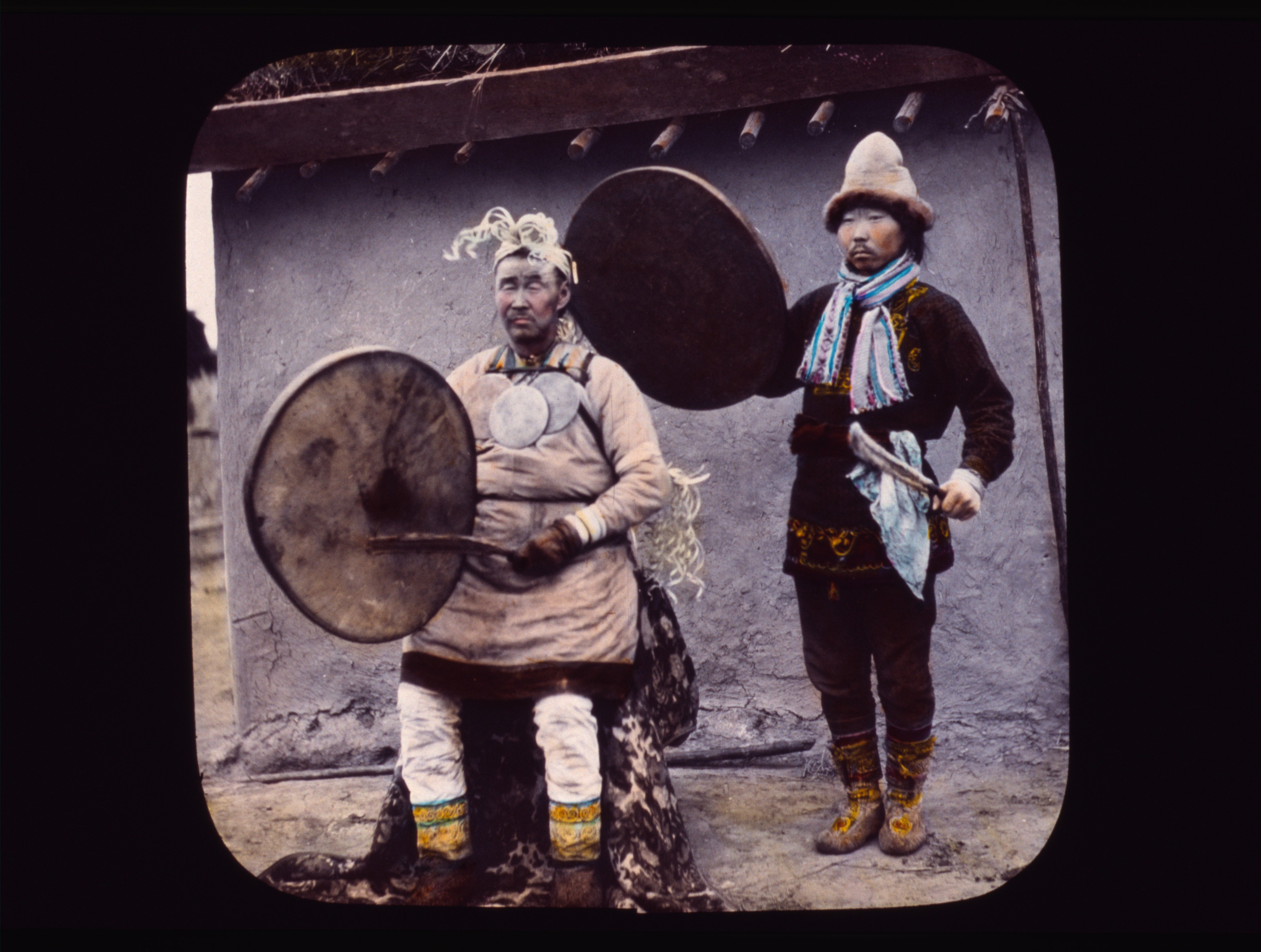
Goldi shaman priest and assistant, 1895

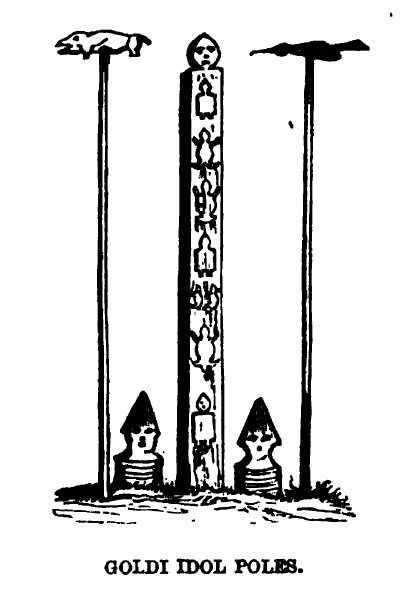
"Idol poles" (totem poles) of the Nanai ("Goldi"); drawing by Richard Maack, c. 1854–1860

The Nanai are mainly Shamanist, with a great reverence for the bear (Doonta) and the tiger (Amba). They consider that the shamans have the power to expel bad spirits by means of prayers to the gods. During the centuries, they have been worshippers of the spirits of the sun, the moon, the mountains, the water and the trees. According to their beliefs, the land was once flat until great serpents gouged out the river valleys. They consider that all the things of the universe possess their own spirit and that these spirits wander independently throughout the world. In the Nanai religion, inanimate objects were often personified. Fire, for example, was personified as an elderly woman whom the Nanai referred to as Fadzya Mama. Young children were not allowed to run up to the fire, since they might startle Fadzya Mama, and men always were courteous in the presence of a fire.

Nanai shamans, like other Tungusic peoples of the region, had characteristic clothing, consisting of a skirt and jacket; a leather belt with conical metal pendants; mittens with figures of serpents, lizards or frogs; and hats with branching horns or bear, wolf, or fox fur attached to them. Bits of Chinese mirrors were also sometimes incorporated into the costume.

==== Funerary beliefs and practices ====
When a person dies, their soul lives on, as the body is merely an outer shell for the soul. This concept of a continuing soul was not introduced to the Nanai by Christianity, but is original to them.

The Nanai believe that each person has both a soul and a spirit. On death, the soul and spirit will go different ways. A person’s spirit becomes malevolent and begins to harm their living relatives. With time, these amban may be tamed and can later be worshipped; otherwise, a special ritual must be performed to chase the evil spirit away.

After death, a person's soul is put into a temporary shelter made of cloth, called a lachako. The souls of the deceased will remain in the lachako for seven days before being moved to a wooden sort of doll called a panyo, where it will remain until the final funerary ritual.

The panyo is taken care of as if it is a living person; for example, it is given a bed to sleep in each night, with a pillow and blanket to match its miniature size. The closest family member is in charge of taking care of the deceased’s panyo. Each night this family member puts the panyo to bed and then wakes it in the morning. The panyo has a small hole carved where the mouth of a person would be, so that a pipe may occasionally be placed there and allow the deceased to smoke. If the family member travels, they will bring the panyo with them.

The dead’s final funerary ritual is called kasa tavori and lasts three days, during which there is much feasting, and the souls of the deceased are prepared for their journey to the underworld. The most important part of the kasa tavori is held on the third day. On this day, the dead’s souls are moved from the panyo into large human-looking wooden figures made to be about the size of the deceased, called mugdeh. These mugdeh are moved into a dog sledge that will be used to transport them to the underworld, Buni. Before leaving for Buni, the shaman communicates any last wishes of the deceased to the gathered family. For example, in the anthropologist Gaer’s account of this ritual, one soul asked his family to repay a debt to a neighbour that the deceased was never able to repay.

After this ceremony, the shaman leads the dog sledges on the dangerous journey to Buni, from where she must leave before sunset or else she will die.

After kasa tavori, it has previously been practised that the living relatives could no longer visit the graves of the deceased, or even talk about them.

The souls of Nanai infants do not behave in the same manner as an adult’s. For the Nanai, children under a year old are not yet people, but are birds. When an infant dies, its soul will turn into a bird and fly off. When an infant dies, they are not buried. Instead, they are wrapped in a paper made of birch bark and placed in a large tree somewhere in the forest. The soul of the child, or the bird, is then free to enter back into a woman. It is common practice in preparing a funeral rite for an infant to mark it with coal, such as drawing a bracelet around the wrist. If a child is later born to a woman who has similar markings to those drawn on a deceased child, then it is believed to be the same soul reborn.

The deceased were normally buried in the ground with the exception of children who died prior to the first birthday; these are buried in tree branches as a "wind burial". Many Nanai are also Tibetan Buddhist.

== Modern population ==
=== Russia ===
Settlement of Nanais in the Far Eastern Federal District by urban and rural settlements in %, 2010 census

In Russia, the Nanai live on the Sea of Okhotsk, on the Amur River, downstream from Khabarovsk, on both sides of Komsomolsk-on-Amur, as well as on the banks of the Ussuri and the Girin rivers (the Samagirs). The Russians formerly called them Goldi, after a Nanai clan name. According to the 2002 census, there were 12,160 Nanai in Russia.

In the Soviet Union, a written standard of the Nanai language (based on Cyrillic) was created by Valentin Avrorin and others. It is still taught today in 13 schools in Khabarovsk.

=== China ===
The Nanai are one of the 56 ethnic groups officially recognized by the People's Republic of China, where they are known as "Hezhe" (赫哲族; Hèzhé Zú). According to the last census of 2004, they numbered 4,640 in China (mostly in Heilongjiang province). Chinese Nanai speak the Hezhen dialect of Nanai. They also have a rich oral literature known as the Yimakan. The dialect does not have a written system in China and Nanai usually write in Chinese. (Second language literacy is 84%.) However, as of 2005, teachers have recently finished compiling what is probably the first Hezhe language textbook.

== Distribution ==
=== By province ===
The 2000 Chinese census recorded 4640 Nanai in China.

Provincial Distribution of the Nanai

Province	Nanai Population	% of total
Heilongjiang	3910	84.27%
Jilin	190	4.09%
Beijing	84	1.81%
Liaoning	82	1.77%
Inner Mongolia	54	1.16%
Hebei	46	0.99%
Others	274	5.91%

=== By county ===
County-level distribution of the Nanai

(Only includes counties or county-equivalents containing >0.45% of China's Nanai population.)

Province	Prefecture	County	Nanai Population	% of China's Nanai Population
Heilongjiang	Jiamusi	Tongjiang City	1060	22.84%
Heilongjiang	Jiamusi	Jiao District	657	14.16%
Heilongjiang	Shuangyashan	Raohe County	529	11.40%
Heilongjiang	Jiamusi	Fuyuan County	468	10.09%
Heilongjiang	Jiamusi	Xiangyang District	131	2.82%
Heilongjiang	Jiamusi	Qianjin District	97	2.09%
Heilongjiang	Harbin	Nangang District	88	1.90%
Jilin	Jilin	Changyi District	71	1.53%
Heilongjiang	Jiamusi	Huachuan County	67	1.44%
Heilongjiang	Jiamusi	Fujin City	65	1.40%
Heilongjiang	Hegang	Suibin County	52	1.12%
Heilongjiang	Jiamusi	Dongfeng District	51	1.10%
Heilongjiang	Harbin	Yilan County	45	0.97%
Beijing		Haidian District	43	0.93%
Heilongjiang	Heihe	Xunke County	43	0.93%
Heilongjiang	Jiamusi	Huanan County	42	0.91%
Heilongjiang	Jiamusi	Tangyuan County	30	0.65%
Jilin	Jilin City	Yongji County	29	0.63%
Jilin	Changchun	Chaoyang District	27	0.58%
Heilongjiang	Qiqihar	Jianhua District	26	0.56%
Heilongjiang	Qiqihar	Longjiang County	26	0.56%
Inner Mongolia	Hulun Buir	Evenk Autonomous Banner	22	0.47%
Heilongjiang	Shuangyashan	Baoqing County	21	0.45%
Other			950	20.47%

== Notable Nanai ==
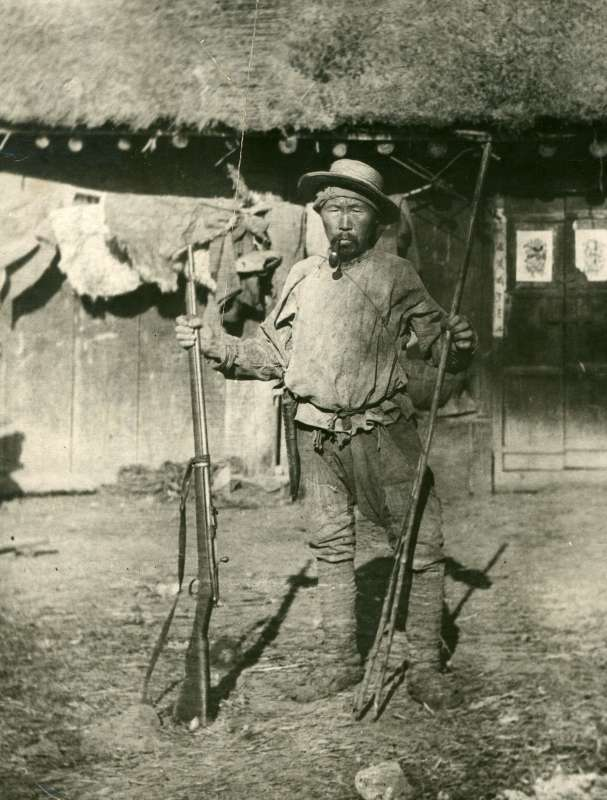
Dersu Uzala, a Goldi hunter, and guide to Russian explorer Vladimir Arsenyev on multiple topographic expeditions in the early 20th century

- Dersu Uzala, a Nanai guide and friend of Russian explorer Vladimir Arsenyev, who wrote about Dersu in two books, later adapted by Japanese director Akira Kurosawa in the 1975 film Dersu Uzala
- Nanai female shaman Tchotghtguerele Chalchin performed an incantation recorded in Siberia for the song "The Lighthouse" (an adaptation of the poem "Flannan Isle" by English poet Wilfrid Wilson Gibson) on French producer Hector Zazou's 1994 album Chansons des mers froides (Songs from the Cold Seas). Lead vocals were performed by Siouxsie Sioux, and background music included performances by the Sakharine Percussion Group and the Sissimut Dance Drummers.
- Kola Beldy (Russian: Кола́ Бельды́) (1929–1993) was a popular singer in the Soviet Union and Russia, particularly known for his rendition of "Увезу тебя я в тундру" (I will take you to the tundra).
- Han Geng, a Chinese pop singer, actor, former member of Korean boy band Super Junior and former leader of subgroup Super Junior-M.
- Kiliii Yuyan, an American photographer whose award-winning work spotlights the Arctic, indigenous communities and conservation through photography, filmmaking and public speaking. Kiliii is a feature contributor to National Geographic Magazine and other major publications.
- Maksim Passar, A sniper serving in the Red Army during World War II, credited with killing 237 enemy soldiers.

== Autonomous areas ==
Province (or equivalent)	Prefecture level	County level	Township level
Heilongjiang	Shuangyashan	Raohe County	Sipai Hezhe Autonomous Township 四排赫哲族乡
Heilongjiang	Jiamusi	Tongjiang	Jiejinkou Hezhe Autonomous Township 街津口赫哲族乡
Heilongjiang	Jiamusi	Tongjiang	Bacha Hezhe Autonomous Township 八岔赫哲族乡
Khabarovsk Krai		Nanaysky District	

== Gallery ==
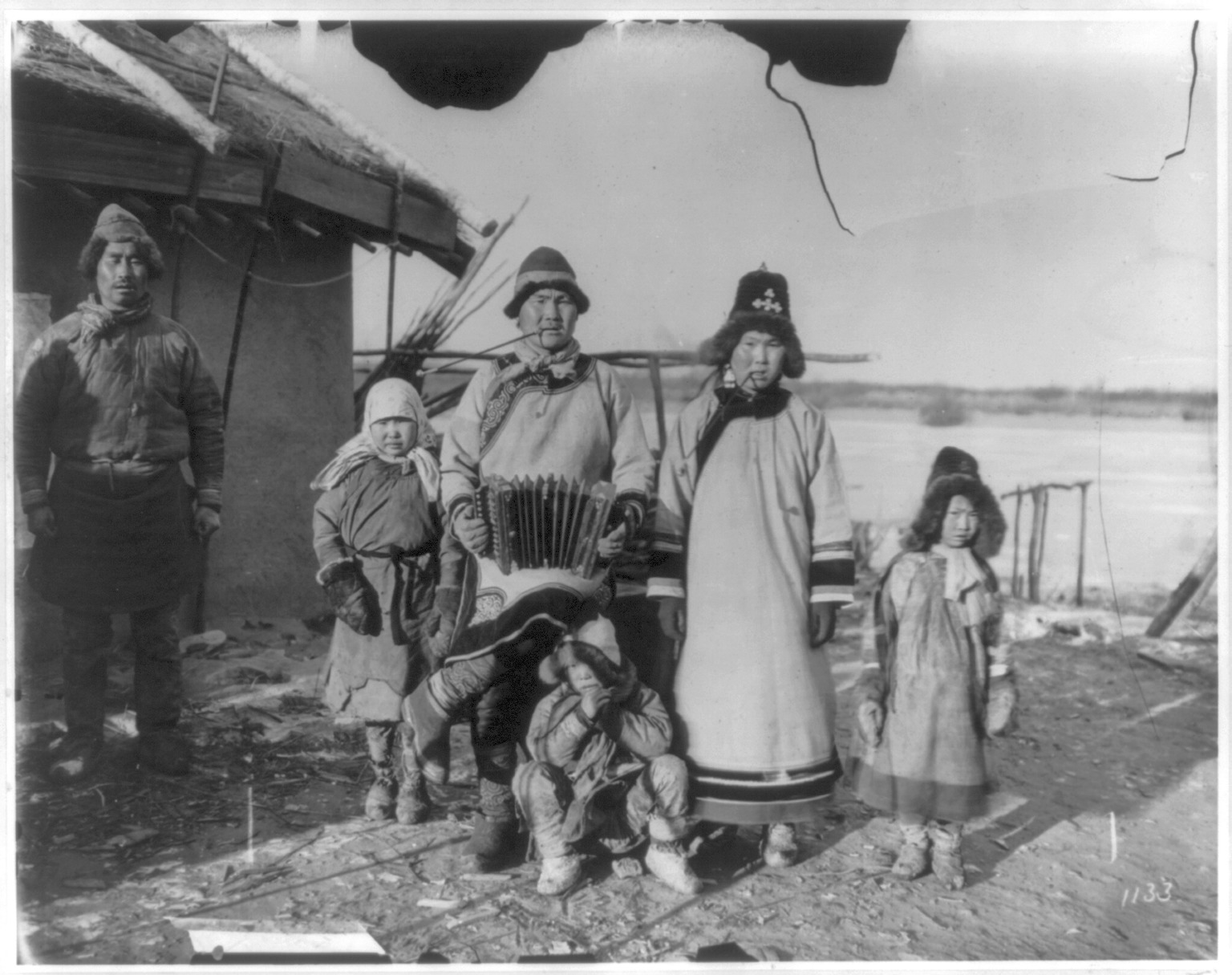
Goldi family group, north of Khabarovsk 1895

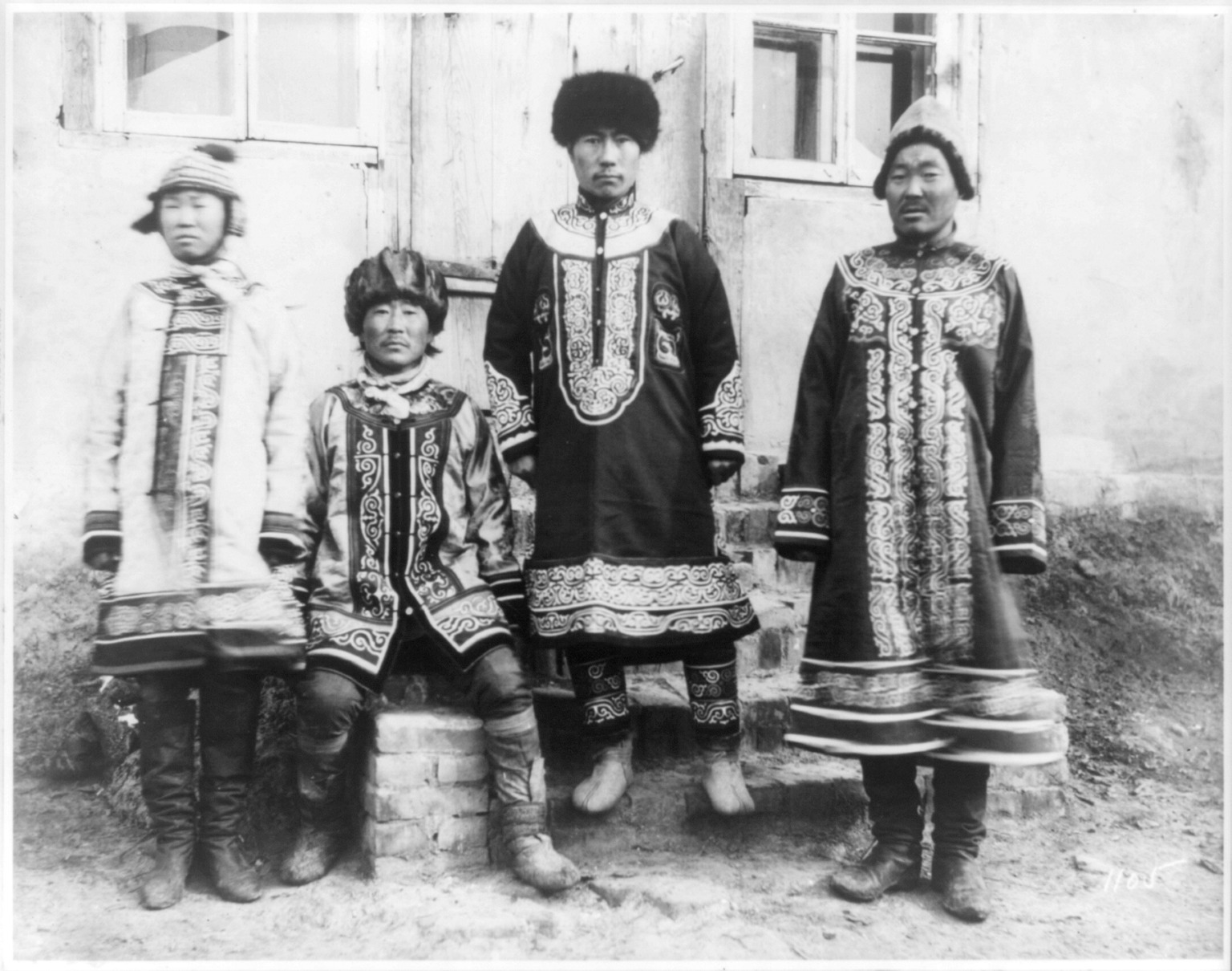
Goldi chiefs north of Khabarovsk, 1895

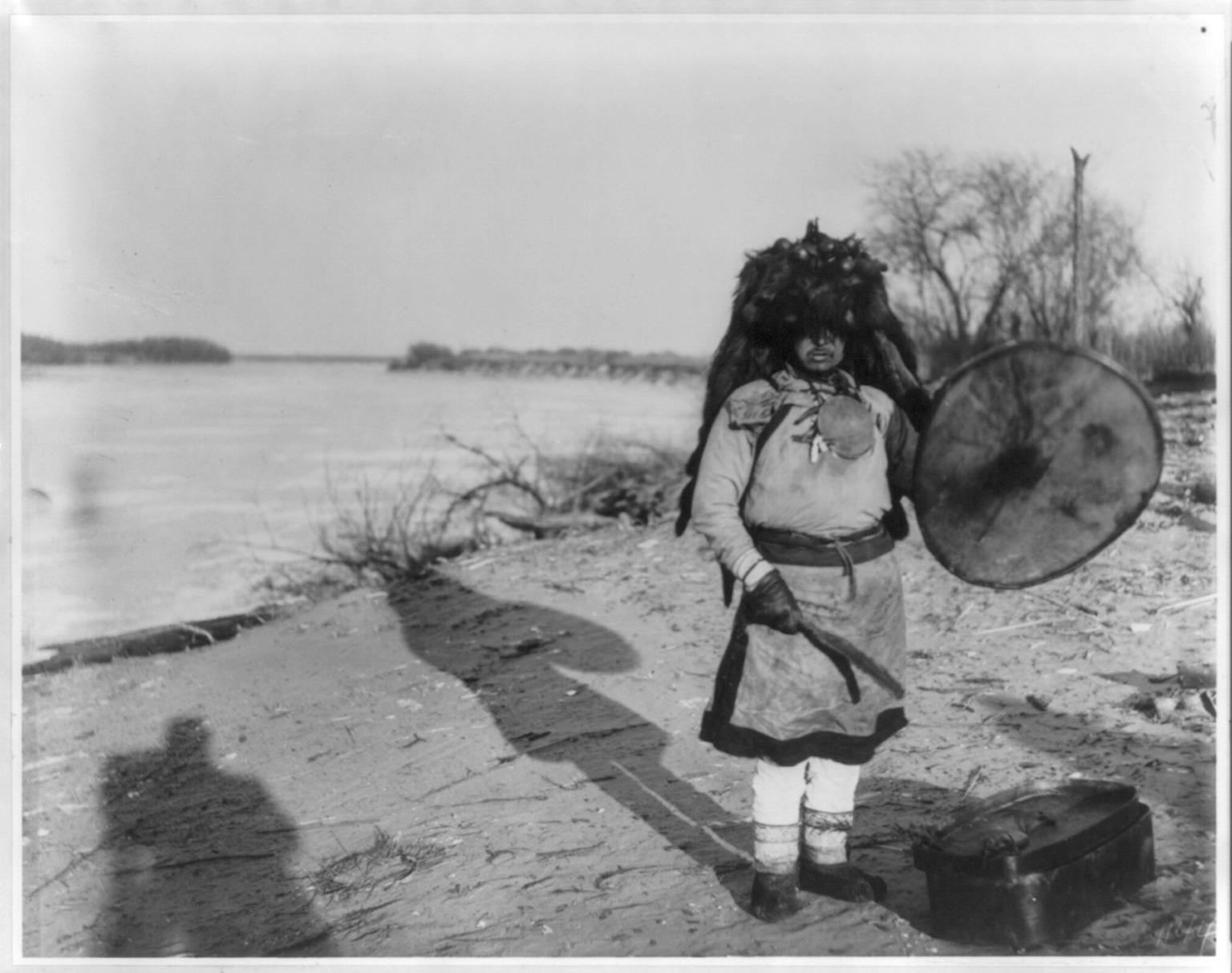
Goldes shaman priest in his regalia, 1895

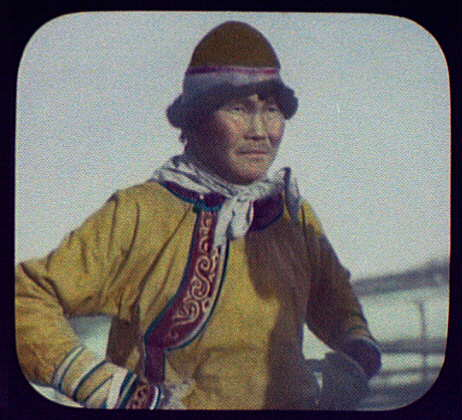
Goldi village chieftain 1895

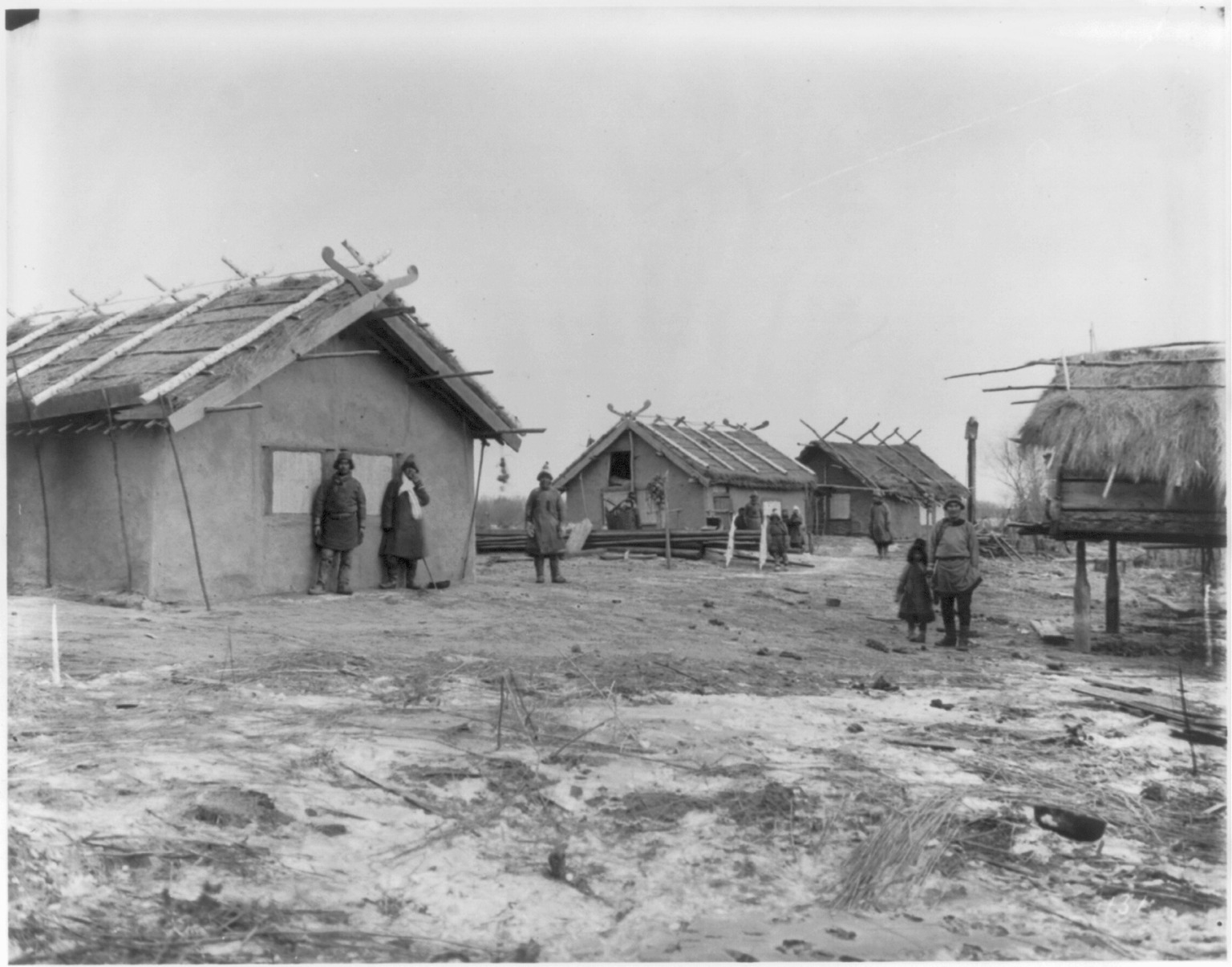
Goldi village on the Amur, north of Khabarovsk 1895

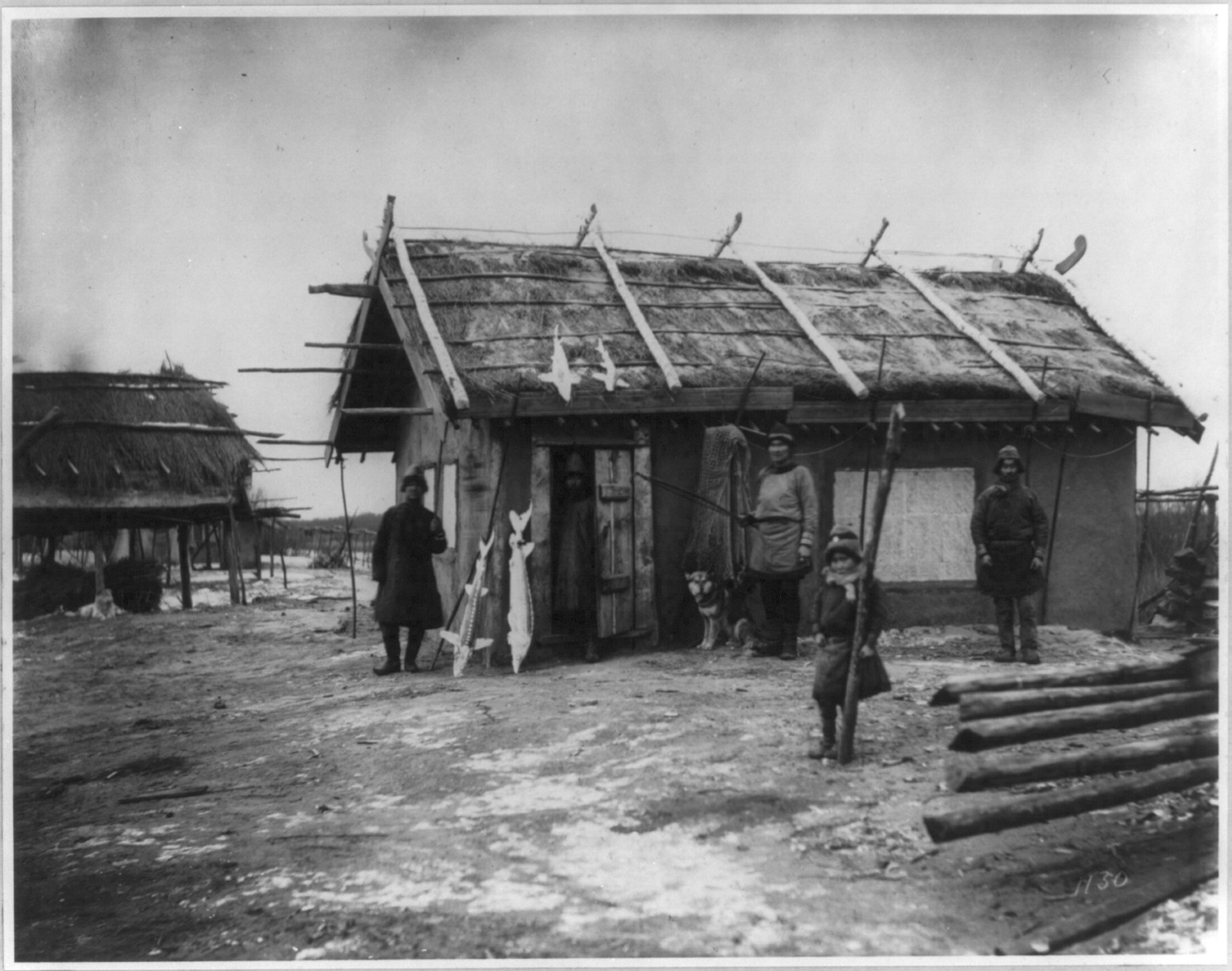
Goldi village along the Amur River, north of Khabarovsk 1895. Note the dried sturgeon leaning against the home and atop its thatched roof.
