= Vladimir Arsenyev =

Russian and Soviet explorer, ethnographer and writer (1872–1930)

- Владимир Арсеньев
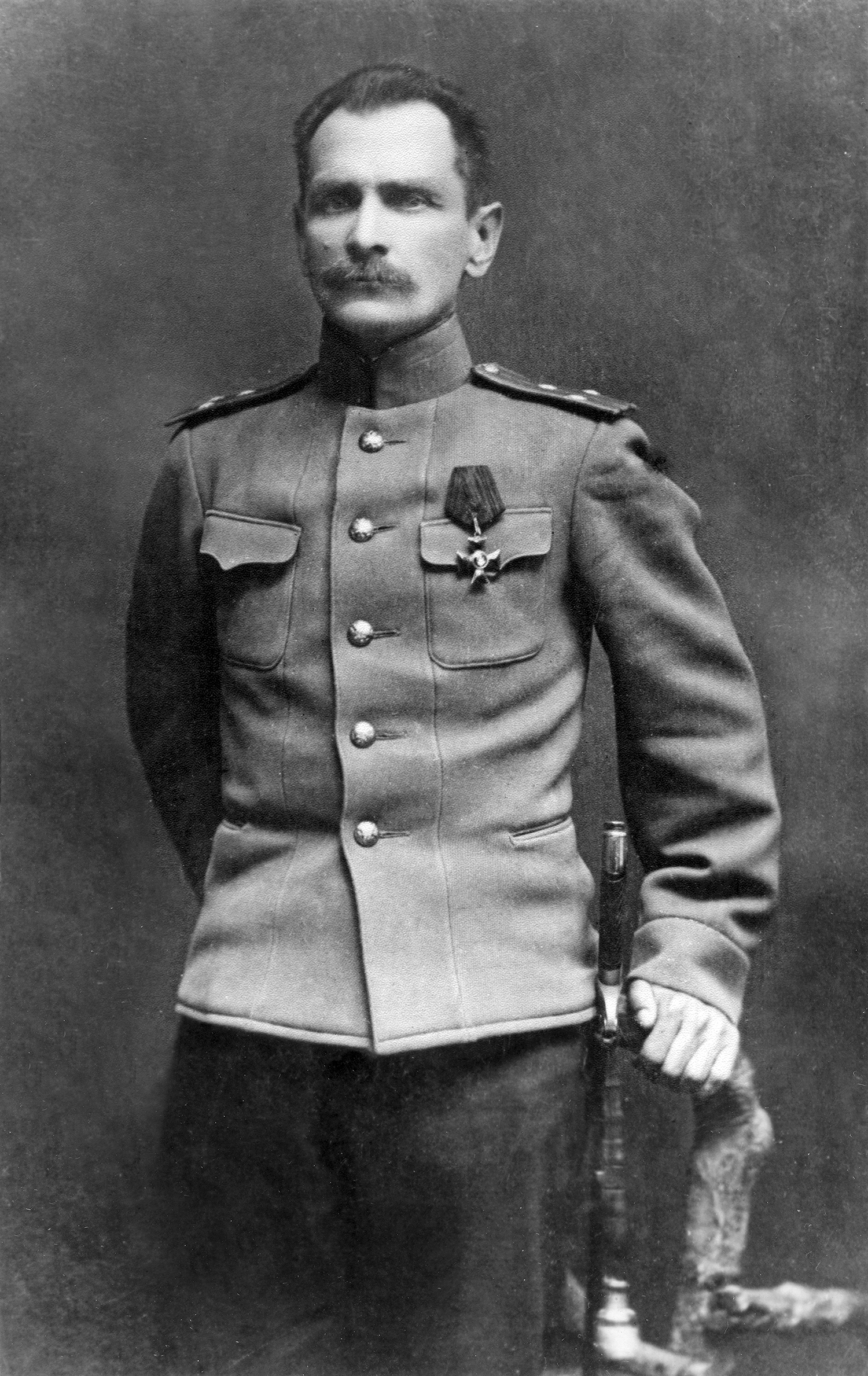
- Arsenyev in 1917
- Born: 10 September 1872; Saint Petersburg, Russian Empire
- Died: 4 September 1930 (aged 57); Vladivostok, Russian SFSR, Soviet Union
- Education: Vladimir Military School
- Occupation: Explorer
- Years active: 1906–1930
- Known for: exploring Russian Far East
- Awards: Order of Saint Vladimir; Order of Saint Anna; Order of Saint Stanislaus; Medal for China Campaign; Russo-Japanese War Medal; Medal "In Commemoration of the 100th Anniversary of the 1812 War"; Medal "In Commemoration of the 300th anniversary of Romanov dynasty"

Vladimir Klavdiyevich Arsenyev, FRGS (Russian: Влади́мир Кла́вдиевич Арсе́ньев; 10 September 1872 – 4 September 1930) was a Russian explorer of the Far East who recounted his travels in a series of books—Po Ussuriyskomu krayu (По Уссурийскому краю, "Along the Ussuri land," 1921) and Dersu Uzala (Дерсу Узала, "Dersu Uzala," 1923)—telling of his military journeys to the Ussuri basin with Dersu Uzala, a native hunter, from 1902 to 1907. He was the first to describe numerous species of Siberian flora and the lifestyles of the local ethnic groups.

== Life ==
Vladimir Arsenyev was born in Saint Petersburg, Russian Empire, on 10 September 1872. His father Klavdy Arsenyev was the illegitimate son of Fyodor Goppmayer, a Tver townsman, and Agrafena Filippovna, a serf woman who was later freed and married Goppmayer. Klavdy Arsenyev, who took the surname of his godfather, was raised to the status of burgher (meshchanin) after the death of his father. He spent most of his life as a clerk for the Nikolayevskaya (Saint Petersburg–Moscow) Railway. (Later, when Vladimir was already an adult, his father served as chief of the Moscow District Railway.) Vladimir's mother, Rufina Kashlachevaya, was the daughter of a serf from the Nizhny Novgorod Governorate.

Arsenyev graduated from the Saint Petersburg Infantry Cadet School in 1896. He began his service in Vladivostok in 1900 and made his first military expedition in the Far East in 1902. His most important expeditions were to Sikhote-Alin, in 1906, 1907–08, 1908–10 and 1912–13. The main purpose of the missions was to draw up maps of the region, but Arsenyev documented a large amount of data not directly related to this task, including botanical, zoological, archaeological and ethnographic information. He studied various local peoples, especially the Udeges. Ethnographic materials collected by Arsenyev are held at the Russian Museum of Ethnography in Saint Petersburg, the Khabarovsk Regional Lore Museum, and elsewhere. He conducted an expedition to Kamchatka in 1918 and another to the Commander Islands in 1923. In 1927 he led a large expedition along the route Sovetskaya Gavan–Khabarovsk. He served as the director of the Khabarovsk Regional Lore Museum from 1910 to 1918 and again from 1924 to 1925.

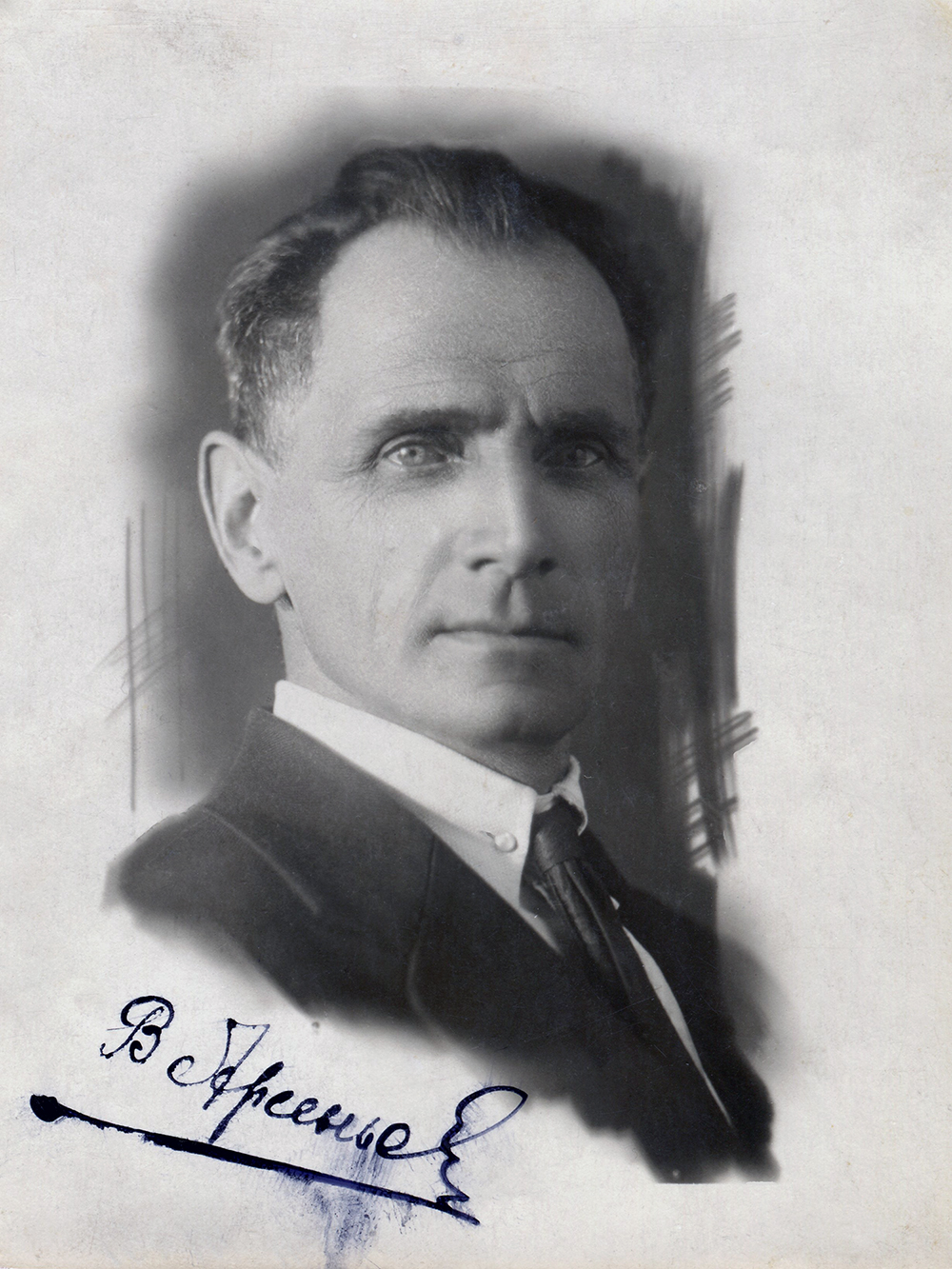
Vladimir Arsenyev in 1928

Arsenyev lived in Vladivostok through the years of the Russian Civil War and was a Commissar for Ethnic Minorities (Komissar po delam inorodcheskim) of the independent Far Eastern Republic. In 1918 his parents and two siblings were murdered in their home by burglars. He married Margarita Nikolayevna Solovyоva, the daughter of a Vladivostok official, in 1919. After the Far Eastern Republic was absorbed by Soviet Russia in 1922 Arsenyev refused to emigrate and stayed in Vladivostok. He gave lectures on ethnography, anthropology, archeology, and the history of "primitive societies" at the universities of Khabarovsk and Vladivostok. He played a major role in the preparation of the 1926 Soviet census and helped draft an ethnographic map of Siberia.

In 1930, Arsenyev made his final trip, this time to the lower part of the Amur River to oversee expeditions for the identification of possible railroad routes. He caught a cold during the trip and died of a heart attack en route back to Vladivostok on 4 September 1930, at the age of fifty-seven. His widow Margarita was arrested in 1934 and again in 1937 after being accused of being a member of an underground organization of spies and saboteurs allegedly headed by her late husband. The military court hearing of the case (21 August 1938) lasted ten minutes and sentenced her to death. She was executed immediately. Arsenyev's daughter Natalya also was arrested in April 1941 and sentenced to the Gulag.

== Work ==
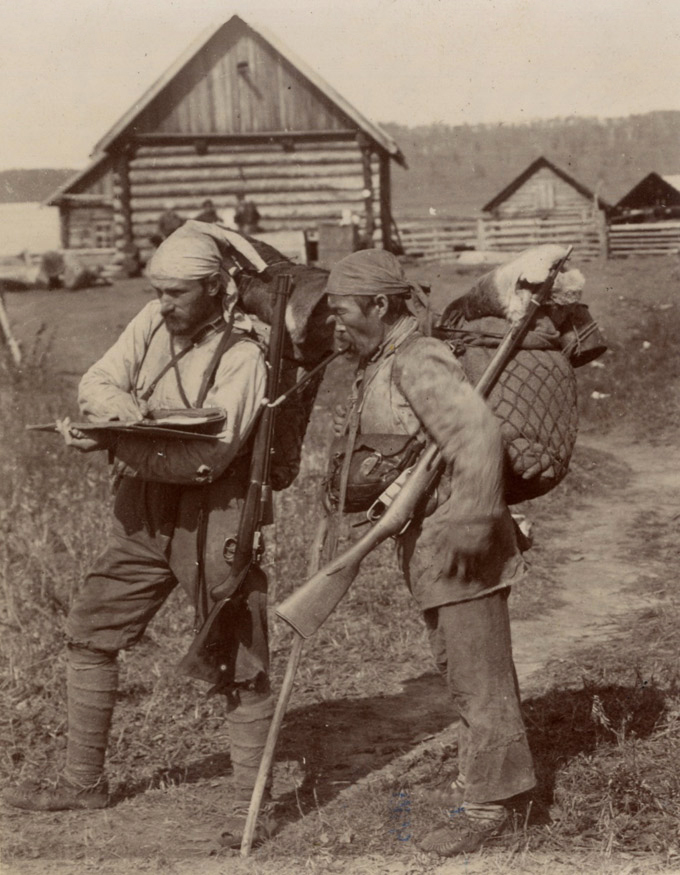
Arsenyev and Dersu Uzala.

Arsenyev is most famous for authoring many books about his explorations, including some 60 works on the geography, wildlife and ethnography of the regions he traveled. Arsenyev's most famous book, Dersu Uzala, is a memoir of three expeditions in the Ussurian taiga (forest) of Northern Asia along the Sea of Japan and North to Vladivostok. The book is named after Arsenyev's guide, an Ussurian native of the Goldi tribe (referred to as the Nanai people today). Eventually the book was made into two films, one by Soviet director Agasi Babayan in 1961, the other by Japanese filmmaker Akira Kurosawa in 1975. Kurosawa's Dersu Uzala won that year's Oscar for Best Foreign-Language Film, only the second Russian film, the first being War and Peace (1966–1967), to win the award. The third book of Arsenyev's trilogy, In the Sikhote-Alin mountains, was published posthumously in 1937.

Arsenyev's books have been translated into multiple languages including English, German, French, Spanish, and Japanese. The "Dersu Uzala trilogy" was first translated in 1924 into German as a two-volume set (In der Wildnis Ostsibiriens). More recently, in 2016 an uncensored, annotated edition of 1921's Across the Ussuri Kray was translated to English.

== Legacy ==
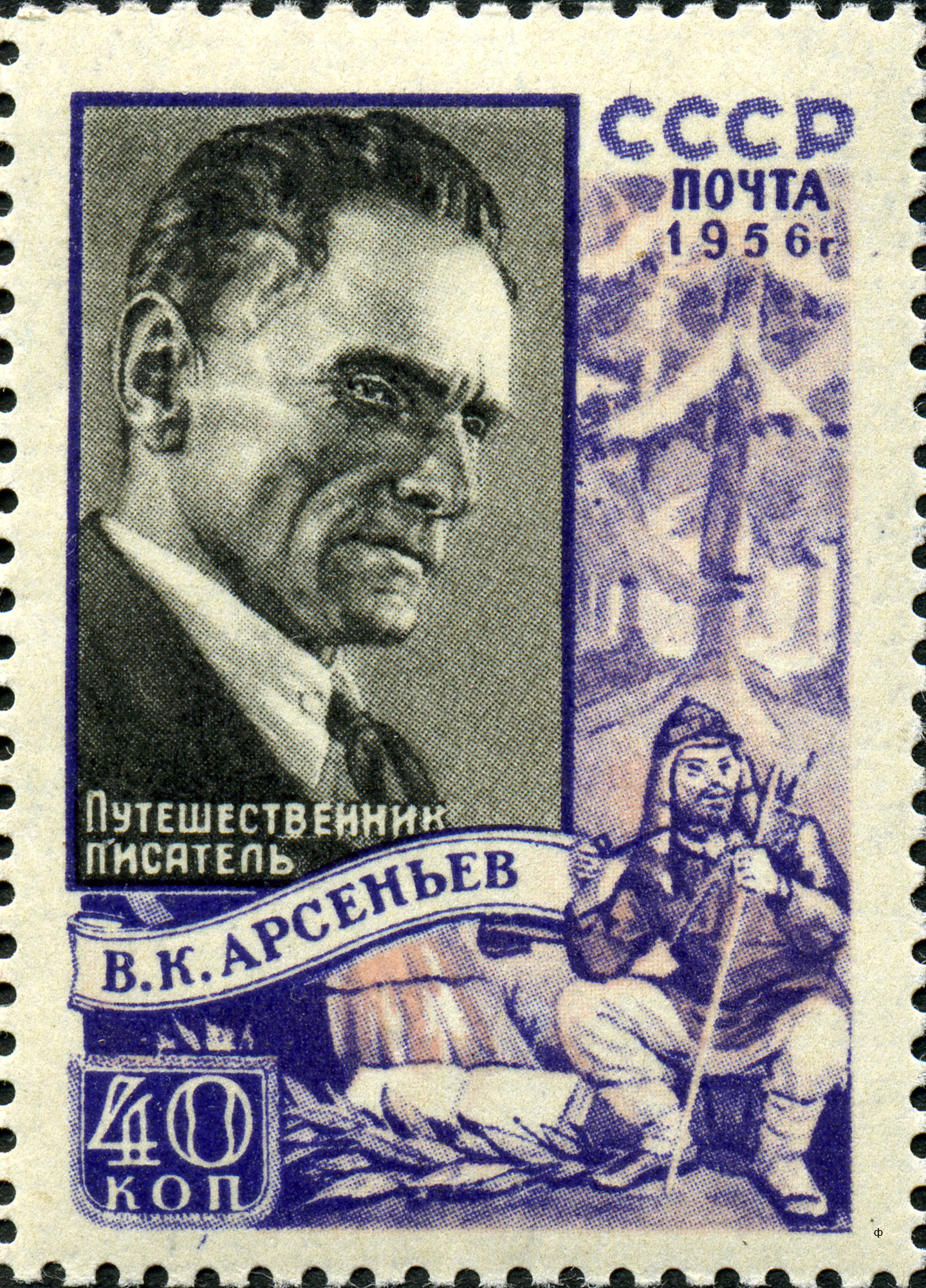
1956 Soviet postage stamp commemorating Vladimir Arsenyev.

Arsenyev's family home in Vladivostok has been made into a museum. A town, Arsenyev, and a river, the Arsenyevka, both located in the Primorsky Krai, are named after him. In 2018 Vladivostok International Airport was renamed after him.

== Selected works ==
- (1921) Po Ussuriyskomu krayu (Dersu Uzala): Puteshestviye v gornuyu oblast Sikhote-Alin (По Уссурийскому краю (Дерсу Узала). Путешествие в горную область Сихотэ-Алинь (Through the Ussuri land (Dersu Uzala): journey in the mountainous region of Sikhote-Alin)). Vladivostok: Tip. Ekho. The first book of Dersu Uzala trilogy. English translation: Across the Ussuri Kray: Travels in the Sikhote-Alin Mountains (Indiana University Press, 2016).
- (1923) Dersu Uzala: Iz vospominaniy o puteshestviyakh po Ussuriyskomu krayu v 1907 g. (Дерсу Узала. Из воспоминаний о путешествиях по Уссурийскому краю в 1907 г (Dersu Uzala: memories from journeys in the Ussuri land in 1907)). Vladivostok: Svobonaya Rossiya. The second book of the Dersu Uzala trilogy.
  - The heavily redacted 1926 combination of Po Ussuriyskomu krayu and Dersu Uzala, titled V debryakh Ussuriyskogo kraya, was translated into English by Malcolm Burr and published as Dersu the Trapper (London: Secker & Warburg, 1939). Another heavily redacted combination from 1946 was translated into English by Victor Shneerson and published as Dersu Uzala (1950). Anne Terry White's 1965 adaptation With Dersu the Hunter: Adventures in the Taiga is a shortening of Shneerson's translation.
- (1930) Skvoz taygu (Сквозь тайгу (Through the taiga)). Moscow: Molodaya Gvardiya.
- (1937) V gorakh Sikhote-Alinya (В горах Сихотэ-Алиня (In the Sikhote-Alin Mountains)). The third book of the Dersu Uzala trilogy, published posthumously.
- (1947–49) Sochineniya (Сочинения (Works)). 6 vols. Vladivostok: Primizdat. (The works in this collection were subject to censorship and abridgment.)
- (1995) Mify, legendy, predaniya i skazki narodov Dalnego Vostoka (Мифы, легенды, предания и сказки народов Дальнего Востока (Myths, legends, traditions, and fables of the peoples of Far East)). Khabarovsk: International Institute of Ethnolinguistic and Oriental Studies (IIEOS). ISSN 1230-3283; ISBN 83-902273-4-7.
- (2007–) Sobraniye sochineniy v 6 tomakh (Собрание сочинений в 6 томах (Collected works in 6 volumes)). Vladivostok: Rubezh.
