= Agasi Babayan =

Agasi Babayan (Armenian: Աղասի Բաբայան, Russian: Агаси́ (Агасий) Арутю́нович Бабая́н; 21 December 1921 in Azatavan, Armenian SSR, USSR – November 17, 1995) was an Armenian film director, screenwriter, and actor. He received the title of Merited Artist of the RSFSR in 1974.

== Biography ==
He studied acting and film direction under Sergei Gerasimov at VGIK and worked at Armenfilm for several years. In 1952, he moved to work at the Mosnauchfilm studio (a Moscow studio that produced educational movies and TV shows). He is best known for making the original 1961 film version of Dersu Uzala (later more famously remade by Akira Kurosawa), as well as a series of four movies about the lynx Kunak based on the stories by Vitaly Bianki, shot in the taiga: The Path Towards Uninterested Love (1971), The Lynx Follows the Path (1982), The Lynx Returns (1986) and The Lynx Follows the Trail (1994). He also produced several documentaries on nature, history, and music.
