= List of works by Akira Kurosawa =

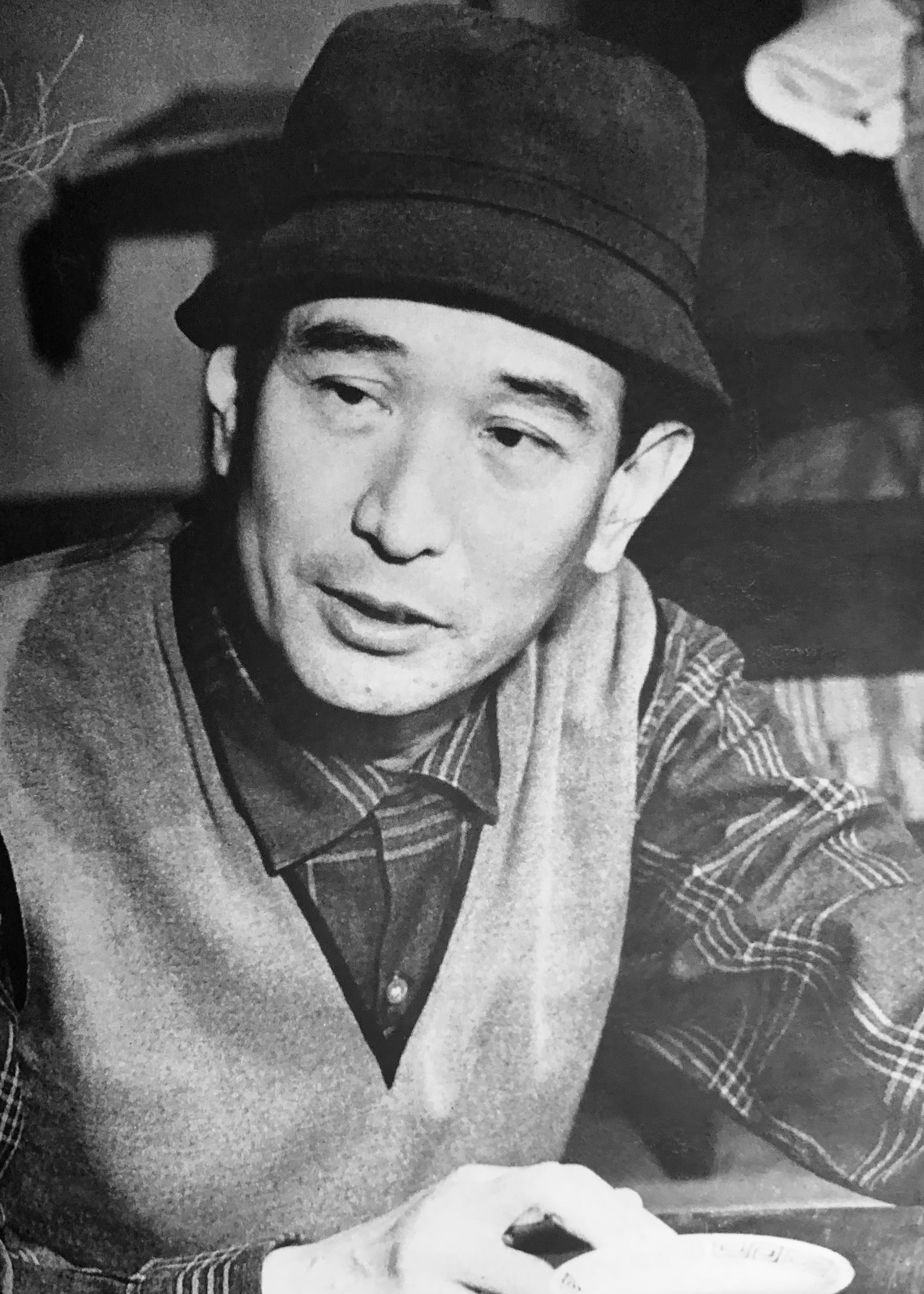
Kurosawa in 1960

The following is a list of works, both in film and other media, for which the Japanese filmmaker Akira Kurosawa made some documented creative contribution. This includes a complete list of films with which he was involved (including the films on which he worked as assistant director before becoming a full director), as well as his little-known contributions to theater, television and literature.

== Filmography ==
=== As director ===
All the following are Japanese productions unless otherwise specified.

| Year | English title | Japanese title | Romanized title | Director | Writer |
|---|---|---|---|---|---|
| 1943 | Sanshiro Sugata (Note: Alternatively known as Judo Saga.) | 姿三四郎 | Sugata Sanshirō | Yes | Yes |
| 1944 | The Most Beautiful | 一番美しく | Ichiban Utsukushiku | Yes | Yes |
| 1945 | Sanshiro Sugata Part II (Note: Alternatively known as Judo Saga 2.) | 續姿三四郎 | Zoku Sugata Sanshirō | Yes | Yes |
| 1945 | The Men Who Tread on the Tiger's Tail | 虎の尾を踏む男達 | Tora no O o Fumu Otokotachi | Yes | Yes |
| 1946 | Those Who Make Tomorrow (Note: Co-directed with Hideo Sekigawa and Kajirō Yamamoto.) | 明日を創る人々 | Asu o Tsukuru Hitobito | Yes | No |
| 1946 | No Regrets for Our Youth | わが青春に悔なし | Waga Seishun ni Kuinashi | Yes | Yes |
| 1947 | One Wonderful Sunday | 素晴らしき日曜日 | Subarashiki Nichiyōbi | Yes | Yes |
| 1948 | Drunken Angel | 酔いどれ天使 | Yoidore Tenshi | Yes | Yes |
| 1949 | The Quiet Duel | 静かなる決闘 | Shizukanaru Kettō | Yes | Yes |
| 1949 | Stray Dog | 野良犬 | Nora Inu | Yes | Yes |
| 1950 | Scandal | 醜聞 | Sukyandaru (Shūbun) | Yes | Yes |
| 1950 | Rashomon | 羅生門 | Rashōmon | Yes | Yes |
| 1951 | The Idiot | 白痴 | Hakuchi | Yes | Yes |
| 1952 | Ikiru | 生きる (Note: Translated literally as To Live.) | Ikiru | Yes | Yes |
| 1954 | Seven Samurai | 七人の侍 | Shichinin no Samurai | Yes | Yes |
| 1955 | I Live in Fear | 生きものの記録 (Note: Translated literally as Record of a Living Being.) | Ikimono no Kiroku | Yes | Yes |
| 1957 | Throne of Blood | 蜘蛛巣城 (Note: Translated literally as Spider Web Castle.) | Kumonosu-jō | Yes | Yes |
| 1957 | The Lower Depths | どん底 | Donzoko | Yes | Yes |
| 1958 | The Hidden Fortress | 隠し砦の三悪人 (Note: Translated literally as The Three Villains of the Hidden Fortress.) | Kakushi Toride no San Akunin | Yes | Yes |
| 1960 | The Bad Sleep Well | 悪い奴ほどよく眠る (Note: Translated literally as The Worse They Are, the Better They Sleep.) | Warui Yatsu Hodo Yoku Nemuru | Yes | Yes |
| 1961 | Yojimbo | 用心棒 (Note: Translated literally as Bodyguard.) | Yōjinbō | Yes | Yes |
| 1962 | Sanjuro | 椿三十郎 | Tsubaki Sanjūrō | Yes | Yes |
| 1963 | High and Low | 天国と地獄 (Note: Translated literally as Heaven and Hell.) | Tengoku to Jigoku | Yes | Yes |
| 1965 | Red Beard | 赤ひげ | Akahige | Yes | Yes |
| 1970 | Dodes'ka-den | どですかでん (Note: Japanese onomatopoeia for "clickety-clack".) | Dodesukaden | Yes | Yes |
| 1975 | Dersu Uzala (Note: Russian–Japanese co-production between Daiei Film and Mosfilm, with dialogue in the Russian language, the only Kurosawa-directed film in a language other than Japanese.) | デルス・ウザーラ | Derusu Uzāra | Yes | Yes |
| 1980 | Kagemusha | 影武者 (Note: Translated literally as Shadow Warrior.) | Kagemusha | Yes | Yes |
| 1985 | Ran (Note: French–Japanese co-production.) | 乱 (Note: Translated literally as Chaos.) | Ran | Yes | Yes |
| 1990 | Dreams (Note: Also known as Akira Kurosawa's Dreams.) (Note: American–Japanese co-production.) | 夢 | Yume | Yes | Yes |
| 1991 | Rhapsody in August | 八月の狂詩曲 | Hachigatsu no Rapusodī (Hachigatsu no Kyōshikyoku) | Yes | Yes |
| 1993 | Madadayo | まあだだよ (Note: Translated literally as Not Yet.) | Mādadayo | Yes | Yes |

=== As producer ===
Note: Data for the remainder of this filmography is derived primarily from the complete filmography created by Kurosawa's biographer, Stuart Galbraith IV, supplemented by IMDb's Kurosawa page.

For the following films that Kurosawa directed, he also received a production credit:

- Stray Dog (associate producer)
- Throne of Blood (co-producer)
- The Lower Depths (producer)
- The Hidden Fortress (co-producer)
- The Bad Sleep Well (co-producer)
- Yojimbo (associate producer)
- Sanjuro (associate producer)
- High and Low (associate producer)
- Red Beard (associate producer)
- Dodesukaden (executive producer and producer)
- Kagemusha (producer).

In addition, Kurosawa received a production credit on one film that he himself did not direct: Haru no tawamure (1949) (Spring Flirtation), written and directed by Kajiro Yamamoto, on which he served as an associate producer.

=== As screenwriter ===
Kurosawa wrote or co-wrote the screenplays for all the films he himself directed. However, to supplement his income, he also wrote scripts for other Japanese directors throughout the 1940s, and even through the 1950s and part of the 1960s, long after he had become world-famous. He also worked on the scripts for two Hollywood productions he was slated to direct, but which, for complex reasons, were completed by and credited to other directors (although he did shoot some scenes for Tora tora tora!, the footage from which has apparently not survived). Finally, near the end of his life, he completed scripts he intended to direct but did not live to make, which were then filmed by others. A table of all these screenplays is given below; all titles are Japanese productions unless otherwise noted.

Indicates principal works directed by Kurosawa.

| Year | English title | Japanese title | Romanized title | Director | Notes | Ref. |
|---|---|---|---|---|---|---|
| 1941 | Horse | 馬 | Uma | Kajirō Yamamoto | Uncredited, but written alongside his mentor Kajirō Yamamoto. | |
| 1942 | Wind Currents of Youth | 青春の気流 | Seishun no Kiryu | Shu Fushimizu | Based on "Construction of Love" and "The Life Plan" by Jun Minamikawa. | |
| 1942 | The Triumphant Song of the Wings | 翼の凱歌 | Tsubasa no Gaika | Satsuo Yamamoto | Credited alongside Bonhei Sotoyama. | |
| 1943 | Sanshiro Sugata | 姿三四郎 | Sugata Sanshirō | Akira Kurosawa | Based on the novel Sugata Sanshirō by judoka Tsuneo Tomita. | |
| 1944 | Wrestling-ring Festival | 土俵祭 | Dohyōmatsuri | Santaro Marune | —N/a | |
| 1944 | The Most Beautiful | 一番美しく | Ichiban Utsukushiku | Akira Kurosawa | —N/a | |
| 1945 | Bravo! Tasuke Isshin | 天晴れ一心太助 | Appare Isshin Tasuke | Kiyoshi Saeki | —N/a | |
| 1945 | Sanshiro Sugata Part II | 續姿三四郎 | Zoku Sugata Sanshirō | Akira Kurosawa | Based on the novel Sugata Sanshirō by judoka Tsuneo Tomita. | |
| 1945 | The Men Who Tread on the Tiger's Tail | 虎の尾を踏む男達 | Tora no O o Fumu Otokotachi | Akira Kurosawa | Based on the kabuki play Kanjinchō. | |
| 1946 | No Regrets for Our Youth | わが青春に悔なし | Waga Seishun ni Kuinashi | Akira Kurosawa | Credited alongside Eijiro Hisaita. Keiji Matsuzaki has an uncredited writer role. | |
| 1947 | Four Love Stories "First Love" | 四つの恋の物語 第一話 初恋 | Yotsu no Koi no Monogatari (Dai Ichi: Hatsukoi) | Shiro Toyoda | Omnibus film. Credited for first of four sections. | |
| 1947 | One Wonderful Sunday | 素晴らしき日曜日 | Subarashiki Nichiyōbi | Akira Kurosawa | Credited alongside Keinosuke Uegusa. | |
| 1947 | Snow Trail | 銀嶺の果て | Ginrei no Hate | Senkichi Taniguchi | Received main credit. Senkichi Taniguchi has an uncredited writer role. | |
| 1948 | The Portrait | 肖像 | Shōzō | Keisuke Kinoshita | —N/a | |
| 1948 | Drunken Angel | 酔いどれ天使 | Yoidore Tenshi | Akira Kurosawa | Credited alongside Keinosuke Uegusa. | |
| 1949 | Lady from Hell | 地獄の貴婦人 | Jigoku no Kifujin | Motoyoshi Oda | Credited alongside Motosada Nishikame. | |
| 1949 | The Quiet Duel | 静かなる決闘 | Shizukanaru Kettō | Akira Kurosawa | Credited alongside Senkichi Taniguchi. Based on a play by Kazuo Kikuta. | |
| 1949 | Jakoman and Tetsu | ジャコ萬と鉄 | Jakoman to Tetsu | Senkichi Taniguchi | Credited alongside Senkichi Taniguchi. Based on "Herring Fishery" by Keizo Kajino. | |
| 1949 | Stray Dog | 野良犬 | Nora Inu | Akira Kurosawa | Credited alongside Ryūzō Kikushima. | |
| 1950 | Escape at Dawn | 暁の脱走 | Akatsuki no Dassō | Senkichi Taniguchi | Credited alongside Senkichi Taniguchi. Based on a story by Yasujiro Tamura. | |
| 1950 | Scandal | 醜聞 | Sukyandaru (Shūbun) | Akira Kurosawa | Credited alongside Ryūzō Kikushima. | |
| 1950 | Tetsu of Jilba | ジルバの鉄 | Jiruba no Tetsu | Isamu Kosugi | —N/a | |
| 1950 | Rashomon | 羅生門 | Rashōmon | Akira Kurosawa | Credited alongside Shinobu Hashimoto. Based on the short stories "In a Grove" and "Rashōmon" by Ryūnosuke Akutagawa. | |
| 1950 | Fencing Master | 殺陣師段平 | Tateshi Danpei | Masahiro Makino | —N/a | |
| 1951 | Beyond Love and Hate | 愛と憎しみの彼方へ | Ai to Nikushimi no Kanata e | Senkichi Taniguchi | Credited alongside Senkichi Taniguchi. | |
| 1951 | The Idiot | 白痴 | Hakuchi | Akira Kurosawa | Credited alongside Eijiro Hisaita. Based on The Idiot by Fyodor Dostoevsky. | |
| 1951 | The Den of Beasts | 獣の宿 | Kedamono no Yado | Tatsuo Osone | —N/a | |
| 1952 | Vendetta for a Samurai | 荒木又右衛門 決闘鍵屋の辻 | Araki Mataemon: Kettō Kagiya no Tsuji | Kazuo Mori | —N/a | |
| 1952 | Sword for Hire | 戦国無頼 | Sengoku Burai | Hiroshi Inagaki | Credited alongside Hiroshi Inagaki. Based on a novel by Yasushi Inoue, serialized in Sunday Mainichi. | |
| 1952 | Ikiru | 生きる | Ikiru | Akira Kurosawa | Credited alongside Shinobu Hashimoto and Hideo Ogumi. | |
| 1953 | Blow! Spring Wind | 吹けよ春風 | Fukeyo Harukaze | Senkichi Taniguchi | Credited alongside Senkichi Taniguchi. | |
| 1954 | Seven Samurai | 七人の侍 | Shichinin no Samurai | Akira Kurosawa | Credited alongside Shinobu Hashimoto and Hideo Ogumi. | |
| 1955 | Vanished Enlisted Man | 消えた中隊 | Kieta Chūtai | Akira Minura | Credited alongside Ryūzō Kikushima. | |
| 1955 | I Live in Fear | 生きものの記録 | Ikimono no Kiroku | Akira Kurosawa | Credited alongside Shinobu Hashimoto and Hideo Ogumi. | |
| 1955 | Hiba Arborvitae Story | あすなろ物語 | Asunaro Monogatari | Hiromichi Horikawa | —N/a | |
| 1955 | Sanshiro Sugata | 姿三四郎 | Sugata Sanshirō | Shigeo Tanaka | First remake of Sanshiro Sugata (1943) based on Kurosawa's script. | |
| 1957 | Throne of Blood | 蜘蛛巣城 | Kumonosu-jō | Akira Kurosawa | Credited alongside Shinobu Hashimoto, Ryūzō Kikushima and Hideo Ogumi. Loosely based on Macbeth by William Shakespeare. | |
| 1957 | The Lower Depths | どん底 | Donzoko | Akira Kurosawa | Credited alongside Hideo Oguni. Based on The Lower Depths by Maxim Gorky. | |
| 1957 | Three Hundred Miles through Enemy Lines | 敵中横断三百里 | Tekichū Ōdan Sanbyaku Ri | Issei Mori | Credited alongside Hideo Oguni. | |
| 1958 | The Hidden Fortress | 隠し砦の三悪人 | Kakushi Toride no San Akunin | Akira Kurosawa | Credited alongside Ryūzō Kikushima, Hideo Oguni, and Shinobu Hashimoto. | |
| 1959 | Saga of the Vagabonds | 戦国群盗伝 | Sengoku Guntōden | Toshio Sugie | Credited alongside Sadao Yamanaka. Based on a story by Juro Miyoshi. | |
| 1960 | The Bad Sleep Well | 悪い奴ほどよく眠る | Warui Yatsu Hodo Yoku Nemuru | Akira Kurosawa | Credited alongside Hideo Oguni, Eijiro Hisata, Ryūzō Kikushima, and Shinobu Hashimoto. | |
| 1961 | Yojimbo | 用心棒 | Yōjinbō | Akira Kurosawa | Credited alongside Hideo Oguni and Ryūzō Kikushima. | |
| 1962 | Sanjuro | 椿三十郎 | Tsubaki Sanjurō | Akira Kurosawa | Credited alongside Hideo Oguni and Ryūzō Kikushima. Based on a novel by Shūgorō Yamamoto. | |
| 1962 | Fencing Master | 殺陣師段平 | Tateshi Danpei | Harumi Mizuho | A remake of Fencing Master (1950), which was written by Kurosawa. | |
| 1963 | High and Low | 天国と地獄 | Tengoku to Jigoku | Akira Kurosawa | Credited alongside Hideo Oguni and Ryūzō Kikushima. Based on the novel King's Ransom by Ed McBain. | |
| 1964 | Jakoman and Tetsu | ジャコ萬と鉄 | Jakoman to Tetsu | Kinji Fukasaku | A remake of Jakoman and Tetsu (1949), which was written by Kurosawa and Senkichi Taniguchi. Originally based on "Herring Fishery" by Keizo Kajino. | |
| 1965 | Red Beard | 赤ひげ | Akahige | Akira Kurosawa | Credited alongside Ryūzō Kikushima, Hideo Oguni, and Masato Ide. Based on the novel Akahige Shinryōtan by Shūgorō Yamamoto. | |
| 1965 | Sanshiro Sugata | 姿三四郎 | Sugata Sanshirō | Seiichirō Uchikawa | Second remake of Sanshiro Sugata (1943) based on Kurosawa's script. Kurosawa served as editor. | |
| 1970 | Tora! Tora! Tora! | トラ・トラ・トラ！ | Tora! Tora! Tora! | Richard Fleischer, Toshio Masuda, Kinji Fukasaku, Akira Kurosawa (portions removed) | Credit received by Larry Forrester, Hideo Oguni, Ryūzō Kikushima; Kurosawa's credit for directing and writing was removed after his firing in December 1969. Based on the books Tora! Tora! Tora by Gordon W. Prange and The Broken Seal by Ladislas Farago. | |
| 1970 | Dodes'ka-den | どですかでん | Dodesukaden | Akira Kurosawa | Credited alongside Hideo Ogumi and Shinobu Hashimoto. Based on the novel The Town Without Seasons by Shūgorō Yamamoto. | |
| 1975 | Dersu Uzala | デルス·ウザーラ | Derusu Uzāra | Akira Kurosawa | Japanese-Soviet co-production. Credited alongside Yuri Nagibin. Based on the novel Dersu Uzala by Vladimir Arsenyev. | |
| 1980 | Kagemusha | 影武者 | Kagemusha | Akira Kurosawa | Credited alongside Masato Ide. | |
| 1985 | Ran | 乱 | Ran | Akira Kurosawa | French-Japanese co-production. Credited alongside Hideo Oguni and Masato Ide. Loosely based on the play King Lear by William Shakespeare. | |
| 1985 | Runaway Train | —N/a | —N/a | Andrei Konchalovsky | American production. Originally set to be directed by Kurosawa. Contributions by Ryūzō Kikushima and Hideo Oguni are uncredited. | |
| 1990 | Dreams | 夢 | Yume | Akira Kurosawa | Sole writer. | |
| 1991 | Rhapsody in August | 八月の狂詩曲 | Hachigatsu no Rapusodī | Akira Kurosawa | Credited alongside Ishirō Honda. Based on the novel Nabe no Naka by Kiyoko Murata. | |
| 1993 | Madadayo | まあだだよ | Mādadayo | Akira Kurosawa | Credited alongside Ishirō Honda. Based on works by Hyakken Uchida. | |
| 2000 | After the Rain | 雨あがる | Ame Agaru | Takashi Koizumi | Posthumous script and final screenplay by Kurosawa. Based on a short story by Shūgorō Yamamoto. | |
| 2000 | Dora-heita | どら平太 | Doraheita | Kon Ichikawa | Credited alongside Kon Ichikawa, Keisuke Kinoshita, and Masaki Kobayashi. Based on the novel Diary of a Town Magistrate by Shūgorō Yamamoto. | |
| 2002 | The Sea Is Watching | 海は見ていた | Umi wa Miteta | Kei Kumai | Sole writer. Posthumous credit. | |

In addition, Kurosawa wrote the following unproduced scripts, composed during the pre-war period in the 1930s and also the wartime period in the 1940s, either when he was still an assistant director or had just graduated to full director. Some of these won prizes in screenwriting contests, establishing his reputation as a promising talent even though they were never filmed.

- Deruma-dera no Doitsujin – A German at Daruma Temple
- Shizukanari – All Is Quiet
- Yuki – Snow
- Mori no Senichia – A Thousand and One Nights in the Forest
- Jajauma Monogatari – The Story of a Bad Horse
- Dokkoi Kono Yari – The Lifted Spear
- San Paguita no Hana – The San Pajuito Flower
- Utsukishiki Koyomi – Beautiful Calendar
- Daisan Hatoba – The Third Harbor

=== As assistant director ===
| Year | Romanization of Japanese Title | English Title | Director | Kurosawa's Credit |
|---|---|---|---|---|
| 1936 | Shojo Hanazono | Paradise of the Virgin Flowers | Shigeo Yagura | Third Assistant Director |
| 1936 | Enoken no Senman Chōja | Enoken's Ten Million (The Millionaire or Enoken the Millionaire) | Kajirō Yamamoto | Third Assistant Director |
| 1936 | Zoku Enoken no Senman Chōja | Enoken's Ten Million Sequel | Kajirō Yamamoto | Third Assistant Director |
| 1936 | Tōkyō Rapusodi | Tokyo Rhapsody | Shū Fushimizu | Third Assistant Director |
| 1937 | Sengoku Guntō-den – Dai Ichibu Tora-ōkami (Sengoku Guntō-den – Zenpen Tora-ōkami) | Saga of the Vagabonds – Part One: Tiger-wolf | Eisuke Takizawa | Third Assistant Director |
| 1937 | Sengoku Guntō-den – Dai Nibu Akatsuki no Zenhin (Sengoku Guntō-den – Kōhen Akatsuki no Zenhin) | Saga of the Vagabonds – Part Two: Forward at Dawn | Eisuke Takizawa | Third Assistant Director |
| 1937 | Otto no Teisō – Haru Kureba (Otto no Teisō – Zenpen Haru Kureba) | A Husband's Chastity – If Spring Comes | Kajirō Yamamoto | Third Assistant Director |
| 1937 | Otto no Teisō – Aki Futatabi (Otto no Teisō – Kōhen Aki Futatabi) | A Husband's Chastity – Fall Again | Kajirō Yamamoto | Third Assistant Director |
| 1937 | Nihon Josei Dokuhon | Japanese Women's Textbook | Kajirō Yamamoto (Volume I only) | Third Assistant Director (Volume I only) |
| 1937 | Nadare | Avalanche | Mikio Naruse | Assistant Director |
| 1937 | Enoken no Chakkiri Kinta – Zenpen; Mamayo Sandogasa: Ikiha Yoiyoi | Enoken's Chikiri Kinta Part 1 – Momma, the Hat: The Nice Way | Kajirō Yamamoto | Third Assistant Director |
| 1937 | Enoken no Chakkiri Kinta – Kōhen kaeri wa Kowai Mateba Hiyori | Enoken's Chikiri Kinta Part 2 – Returning Is; Scary, but the Weather Will Clear If You Wait | Kajirō Yamamoto | Third Assistant Director |
| 1937 | Utsukushiki Taka | The Beautiful Hawk | Kajirō Yamamoto | Chief Assistant Director |
| 1938 | Chinetsu | Subterranean Heat | Eisuke Takizawa | Chief Assistant Director |
| 1938 | Tōjūrō no Koi | Tojuro's Love | Kajirō Yamamoto | Chief Assistant Director |
| 1938 | Tsuzurikata Kyōshitsu | Composition Class | Kajirō Yamamoto | Chief Assistant Director |
| 1938 | Enoken no Bikkuri Jinsei | Enoken's Surprising Life | Kajirō Yamamoto | Chief Assistant Director |
| 1939 | Enoken no Gatchiri Jidai | Enoken's Shrewd Period | Kajirō Yamamoto | Chief Assistant Director |
| 1939 | Chūshingura – Kōhen | Chushingura Part 2 | Kajirō Yamamoto | Chief Assistant Director |
| 1939 | Nonki Yokochō | Easy Alley | Kajirō Yamamoto | Chief Assistant Director |
| 1940 | Roppa no Shinkon Ryokō | Roppa's Honeymoon | Kajirō Yamamoto | Chief Assistant Director |
| 1940 | Enoken no Zangiri Kinta | Enoken's Cropped Kinta | Kajirō Yamamoto | Chief Assistant Director |
| 1940 | Songokū – Zenpen | Songoku Part 1 | Kajirō Yamamoto | Chief Assistant Director |
| 1940 | Songokū – Kōhen | Songoku Part 2 | Kajirō Yamamoto | Chief Assistant Director |
| 1941 | Uma | Horse | Kajirō Yamamoto | Second Unit Director (Also, editor, co-screenwriter and co-director (uncredited)) |

=== As editor ===
Kurosawa edited nearly all his own films from Throne of Blood onwards, though he only occasionally took on-screen credit for it. There are, however, a few instances in which he edited the work of others, as listed below.

- Horse (1941) (Uma), directed by Kajiro Yamamoto (also second unit director, co-writer (uncredited), co-director (uncredited))
- Snow Trail (1947) (Ginrei no Hate), directed and co-edited by Senkichi Taniguchi (also co-writer)
- Hiba Arborvitae Story (1955) (Asunaro Monogatari) (also co-writer), directed by Hiromichi Horikawa
- Legacy of the 500,000 (1963) (Gojuman-nin no Isan) (uncredited; with Shūichi Anbara), directed by Toshiro Mifune (Note: Mifune, directing his first film, was not confident of this suspense thriller's reception, so he hired Kurosawa to travel to the location and re-edit the footage. The latter agreed to do this more as a favor to his favorite actor than because of any belief in the project. The picture was a modest box-office success, but a critical disaster, and Mifune never directed another film.)

== Theater work ==
During the mid-to-late 1940s, for the first and apparently the only time in his career, Akira Kurosawa involved himself in a number of theater-related projects.

- Shaberu (Talking) – In 1945, immediately after the war, Kurosawa wrote a one-act play entitled Talking, for, in his words, "Kawaguchi's troupe" (presumably meaning playwright Matsutarō Kawaguchi, who was prominent at this time and who also worked in the film industry). The central character of the drama is a fish merchant who, during the war, greatly admires Prime Minister Tōjō. In emulation of his patriarchal hero, the merchant plays the tyrant at home, but when the war ends, his angry family members air their long pent-up grievances against him. Kurosawa called it "a comic treatment of... Japanese who all begin talking at once", because "we who had been able to express nothing of what we were thinking up to that time [the end of the war] all began talking at once."
- Yoidore Tenshi (Drunken Angel) – During the Toho strike of 1948, when Kurosawa could not work, he wrote and directed a stage adaptation of his acclaimed 1948 film (see above), with Takashi Shimura and Toshiro Mifune playing the same roles they played in the movie. The production ran for brief periods in a number of Japanese cities, apparently with great success.
- Predlozhenia (A Marriage Proposal) by Anton Chekhov – Also during the Toho strike, Kurosawa directed a production of this popular early Chekhov farce. Neither the actors who appeared in the production nor its reception by the public is known.

== Television work ==
A documentary about horses called Song of the Horse (or Uma no Uta), directed by Kurosawa, was broadcast in Japan, supposedly on August 31, 1970 (Kurosawa otherwise totally avoided working in television). Very little is known about the film, and even its release date is in question. Although the film is said to have aired in August 1970, it features footage of events that apparently did not take place until the summer of 1971. It was considered a lost film for decades and was not available on home video in any form. At some point in the 2010s, the film was rediscovered. It was remastered and released on DVD by the American independent company SamuraiDVD in 2017, complete with English subtitles.

== Books ==
Prior to writing the screenplay to his film, Stray Dog (Nora Inu, 1949), Kurosawa created, in about six weeks, a novel based on the same story (presumably also called Stray Dog), which he never published. It was written in the style of one of his favorite writers, the French crime author Georges Simenon. Writing it was supposed to help him compose the script as quickly as possible, but he found that writing the screenplay took even longer than usual because of the complex differences between literature and film.

In 1980, inspired by the memoir of one of his heroes, Jean Renoir, he began to publish in serial form his autobiography, entitled Gama no Abura (An Oily Toad). The book deals with the period from the director's birth to his winning the Golden Lion for Rashomon from the Venice Film Festival in 1951; the period from 1951 through 1980 is not covered. The title of the book is a reference to a legend according to which, if one places a deformed toad in a box full of mirrors, it will become so afraid of its own reflection that it will begin to sweat, and this sweat allegedly had medicinal properties. Kurosawa compared himself to the toad, nervous about having to contemplate, through the process of writing his life story, his own multiple "reflections." It was published as a book in Japan in 1981, and in English translation the following year under the title Something Like an Autobiography. The book's appearance coincided with the revival of interest in Kurosawa's work following the international release of Kagemusha. (ISBN 0394509382)

In 1999, his book, Yume wa Tensai de Aru (A Dream Is a Genius) was published posthumously. It has not been translated into English, except for Chapter 3. This chapter consists of a selection of 100 of the director's favorite films, listed in chronological order, with detailed commentaries on each film, all given at the request of Kurosawa's daughter, Kazuko. (Since he deliberately limits himself to one film per director, however, the list emerges as more of a "favorite directors" list than a "greatest films" list.) This chapter can be found in English on the Internet. (ISBN 4163555706) As of 2026, an annotated list of his 100 films appears in the book Long Take, translated by Anne McKnight (ISBN 9781517903299)

Complete Drawings (with text in Japanese) was published by Shogakukan in 1999. (ISBN 4096996114)

The screenplays of many of Kurosawa's films have been published in English. For further information, consult the Wikipedia articles relating to the individual films.
