= List of Japanese films of the 1940s =

A list of films produced in Japan ordered by year in the 1940s. For an A-Z of films see Category:Japanese films. Also see cinema of Japan.

Title	Director	Cast	Genre	Notes
1940
Kaze no Matasaburo	Koji Shima	Akikhiko Katayama	Drama	
Nobuko	Hiroshi Shimizu		Drama	
Shina no yoru	Osamu Fushimizu	Kazuo Hasegawa, Shirley Yamaguchi	Propaganda	
Travelling Actors	Mikio Naruse	Kamatari Fujiwara, Kan Yanagiya	Comedy	
1941
The 47 Ronin	Kenji Mizoguchi	Chojuro Kawarasaki	Samurai film	
Brothers and Sisters of the Toda Family	Yasujirō Ozu	Mieko Takamine	Drama	
Hideko the Bus-Conductor	Mikio Naruse	Hideko Takamine, Kamatari Fujiwara	Drama	
Ornamental Hairpin	Hiroshi Shimizu	Saito Tatsuo, Tanaka Kinuyo	Drama	
1942
Hawai Mare oki kaisen	Kajiro Yamamoto	Susumu Fujita, Setsuko Hara	Propaganda	
There Was a Father	Yasujirō Ozu	Mitsuko Mito, Chishū Ryū	Drama	
1943
Sanshiro Sugata	Akira Kurosawa	Denjiro Okochi, Susumu Fujita	Drama; Martial arts	Akira Kurosawa's first film
Momotarō no Umiwashi	Mitsuyo Seo		Propaganda Animation	
1944
Ano hata o ute	Gerardo de Leon, Yutaka Abe	Roma Aguirre, Norma Blancaflor, Angel Esmeralda, Shigenoba Kawazu, Fernando Poe, Sr., Leopoldo Salcedo, Ichirô Tsukida, Denjirō Ōkōchi	Drama War	co-production with Philippines
Army	Keisuke Kinoshita	Chishū Ryū, Kinuyo Tanaka	Drama	
Miyamoto Musashi	Kenji Mizoguchi	Chojuro Kawarasaki, Kinuyo Tanaka	Jidaigeki	
The Most Beautiful	Akira Kurosawa	Ichirō Sugai	Propaganda drama	
1945
The Men Who Tread on the Tiger's Tail	Akira Kurosawa	Susumu Fujita	Samurai film	
Momotarō: Umi no Shinpei	Mitsuyo Seo		Propaganda Animation	
Sanshiro Sugata Part II	Akira Kurosawa	Denjiro Okochi	Martial arts film	
1946
Aru yo no Tonosama	Teinosuke Kinugasa		Drama	
A Descendant of Taro Urashima	Mikio Naruse	Susumu Fujita, Nobuo Nakamura	Drama	
Josei no Shori	Kenji Mizoguchi	Kinuyo Tanaka, Michiko Kuwano	Drama	
Minshū no Teki	Tadashi Imai	Susumu Fujita, Akitake Kōno	Drama	
No Regrets for Our Youth	Akira Kurosawa	Masao Shimizu	Drama	
Those Who Make Tomorrow	Akira Kurosawa	Kenji Susukida		
Utamaro and His Five Women	Kenji Mizoguchi	Kinuyo Tanaka	Biopic	
1947
Ima Hitotabi no	Heinosuke Gosho		Drama	
The Love of Sumako, the Actress	Kenji Mizoguchi	Kinuyo Tanaka, So Yamamura	Drama	
One Wonderful Sunday	Akira Kurosawa	Isao Numasaki	Romantic comedy	
The Record of a Tenement Gentleman	Yasujirō Ozu	Chōko Iida, Hohi Aoki	Drama	
Snow Trail	Senkichi Taniguchi	Toshiro Mifune, Takashi Shimura	Crime	
Three-Fingered Detective	Sadatsugu Matsuda	Setsuko Hara, Reiko Hatsune, Chiezō Kataoka, Akiko Kazami	Horror	
These Foolish Times	Kajiro Yamamoto	Roppa Furukawa, Kenichi Enomoto	Comedy	
1948
Drunken Angel	Akira Kurosawa	Toshirō Mifune	Crime	
A Hen in the Wind	Yasujirō Ozu	Kinuyo Tanaka	Drama	
President and a female clerk	Hideo Ôba	Taiji Tonoyama	Comedy	music by Akira Ifukube
A Woman in the Typhoon Area	Hideo Ōba	Sô Yamamura, Setsuko Hara, Takashi Kanda, Kamon Kawamura	Crime	
1949
Aoi sanmyaku	Tadashi Imai	Setsuko Hara, Ryō Ikebe	Comedy Drama	
Jakoman and Tetsu	Senkichi Taniguchi	Toshiro Mifune	Action Drama	
Kane no naru oka: Dai san hen, kuro no maki	Keisuki Sasaki	Keiji Sada, Masao Inoue	Drama	
Lady from Hell	Motoyoshi Oda	Michiyo Kogure, Eitaro Ozawa, Ichiro Ryuzaki	Action Drama	
Late Spring	Yasujirō Ozu	Haruko Sugimura	Drama	
The Quiet Duel	Akira Kurosawa	Toshirō Mifune	Drama	
Stray Dog	Akira Kurosawa	Toshirō Mifune	Crime	
Zoku aoi sanmyaku	Tadashi Imai	Setsuko Hara, Ryō Ikebe	Comedy drama	
