= I Live in Fear =

1955 Japanese film by Akira Kurosawa

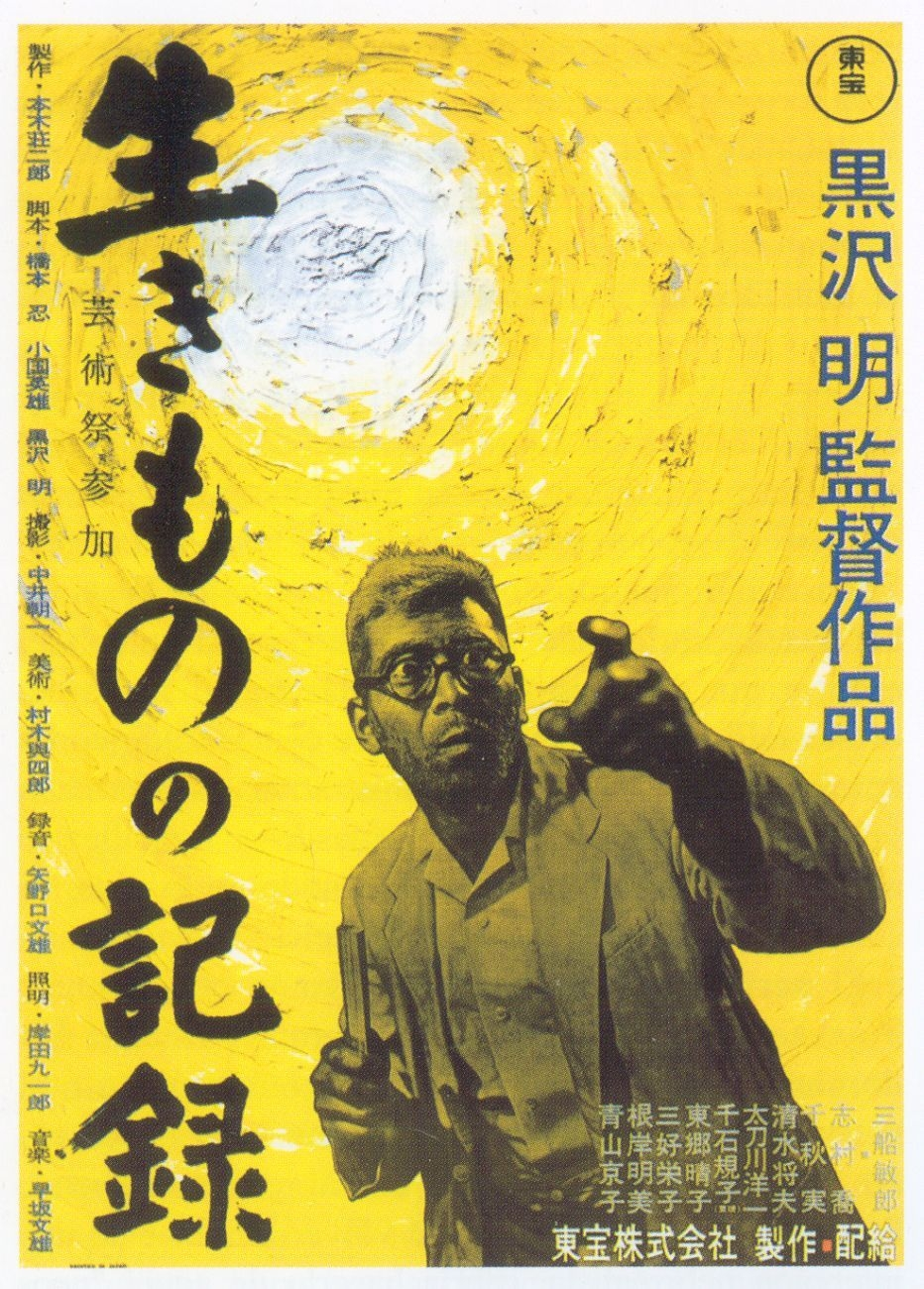
- Theatrical release poster
- Directed by: Akira Kurosawa
- Written by: Shinobu Hashimoto; Akira Kurosawa; Hideo Oguni
- Produced by: Sōjirō Motoki
- Starring: Toshiro Mifune; Takashi Shimura
- Cinematography: Asakazu Nakai
- Edited by: Chozo Obata
- Music by: Fumio Hayasaka
- Production company: Toho
- Distributed by: Toho
- Release date: November 22, 1955
- Running time: 103 minutes
- Country: Japan
- Language: Japanese
- Budget: ¥130 million

I Live in Fear (Japanese: 生きものの記録, Hepburn: Ikimono no Kiroku; lit. 'Record of a Living Being') is a 1955 Japanese drama film directed by Akira Kurosawa, produced by Sōjirō Motoki, and co-written by Kurosawa, Shinobu Hashimoto, and Hideo Oguni. The film is about an elderly Japanese factory owner so terrified of the prospect of a nuclear attack that he becomes determined to move his entire extended family to what he imagines is the safety of a farm in Brazil.

The film stars Kurosawa regulars Toshiro Mifune and Takashi Shimura, and is the director's last with composer Fumio Hayasaka, who died while working on it. It is in black-and-white and runs 103 minutes. The film was entered into the 1956 Cannes Film Festival.

== Plot ==
Kiichi Nakajima (Toshiro Mifune) is an elderly foundry owner who is convinced he and his loved ones will all be killed in an imminent nuclear war if they stay in Japan, so he resolves to move them to perceived safety in Brazil. He does not care that no one else wants to go or that it might make things awkward that he wants to bring his three illegitimate children and two surviving mistresses along with his wife and the four children they have together, saying that nothing is more important than their continued survival.

Kiichi's three oldest children convince his wife to try to have him ruled incompetent in order to keep him from wasting their inheritance on his plan, and they bring him before a three-man arbitration panel that includes Dr. Harada (Takashi Shimura). Harada, a dentist who volunteers with the family court, sympathizes with Kiichi's concerns and points out that the fear of nuclear weapons is present in every citizen of Japan. He wonders aloud whether it may be wrong to rule someone incompetent simply for being more worried than the average citizen, but the panel eventually decides that Kiichi's irrational behavior justifies removing his ability to make the financial decisions for his family by himself.

After this, Kiichi tries to find a way to move forward with the move anyway, but his efforts fail, and his mental state begins to deteriorate more rapidly once he no longer feels as though he is doing anything to save himself and his family from the nuclear holocaust he is sure is coming. Growing increasingly desperate, he decides that his family will be willing to go with him to South America if they no longer have jobs or a source of income tying them to Japan, and he burns down the foundry. When this is discovered, his distress reaches a breaking point after some of his employees point out that his actions indicate he is unconcerned about their lives and his son-in-law argues that there are already more than enough nuclear weapons to destroy all life on this planet and nowhere is really safe.

Harada goes to visit Kiichi at the psychiatric facility to which he has been sent. While waiting to be shown to his room, Harada talks with a psychologist, who remarks that he has found Kiichi's case particularly troubling personally, since it has made him wonder whether it may be more insane to ignore the nuclear threat than it is to take it too seriously. Harada discovers that Kiichi believes he has escaped to another planet and that he has become severely withdrawn from his surroundings. During the visit, however, Kiichi becomes agitated when he sees the Sun through his window and thinks it is the Earth burning.

== Cast ==
- Toshiro Mifune as Kiichi Nakajima
- Takashi Shimura as Dr. Harada
- Minoru Chiaki as Jiro Nakajima, Kiichi's second-eldest son
- Eiko Miyoshi as Toyo Nakajima, Kiichi's wife
- Kyoko Aoyama as Sue Nakajima, Kiichi's youngest legitimate daughter
- Haruko Togo as Yoshi Nakajima, Kiichi's eldest daughter
- Noriko Sengoku as Kimie Nakajima, Ichiro's wife
- Akemi Negishi as Asako Kuribayashi, Kiichi's current mistress and the mother of a toddler who is Kiichi's son
- Hiroshi Tachikawa as Ryoichi Sayama, Kiichi's eldest illegitimate child with a former mistress of his who is now dead
- Kichijirō Ueda as Mr. Kuribayashi, Asako's father
- Masao Shimizu as Takao Yamazaki, Yoshi's husband
- Yutaka Sada as Ichiro Nakajima, Kiichi's eldest son
- Kamatari Fujiwara as Okamoto
- Ken Mitsuda as Judge Araki
- Eijirō Tōno as old man from Brazil
- Atsushi Watanabe as Ishida, a factory worker

== Production ==
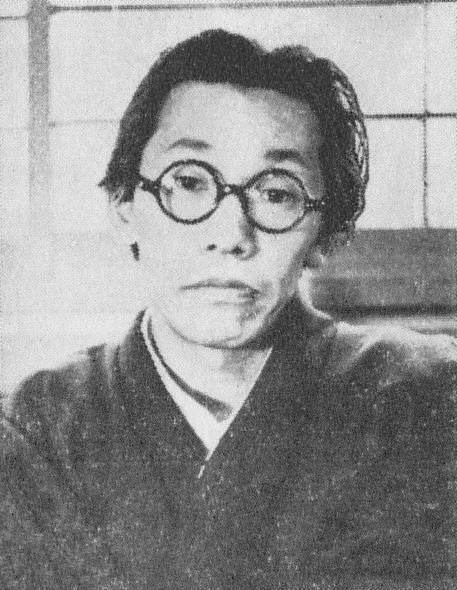
Composer Fumio Hayasaka died while working on I Live in Fear.

I Live in Fear was the last film that composer Fumio Hayasaka worked on before dying of tuberculosis in 1955. He had been Akira Kurosawa's close friend since Drunken Angel in 1948 and collaborated with him on several films. The composer and director collaborated to test "oppositional handling of music and performance" and, in Something Like an Autobiography, Kurosawa would say that working with Hayasaka changed his views on how film music should be used; from then on, he viewed music as "counterpoint" to the image and not just an accompaniment. Kurosawa recalled that it was a conversation with Hayasaka about nuclear weapons in the wake of the H-bomb test accident of 1954 that inspired the plot of I Live in Fear. Masaru Sato, Hayasaka's pupil, wrote that he completed the film's score.

== Release ==
The film was screened in conjunction with the first New York Film Festival at the Museum of Modern Art in New York City in 1963. Vincent Canby felt that the "major flaw of the film is that one never quite believes - or understands - the sincerity of the old man" and claimed that the English subtitles were barely acceptable.

== Reception ==
On the review aggregator website Rotten Tomatoes, the film holds an approval rating of 73%, based on 11 reviews.

== Reissues ==
The Criterion Collection has released I Live in Fear on DVD in North America as part of two Kurosawa-centered box sets; 2008's Postwar Kurosawa, the seventh entry in their Eclipse series, and 2009's AK 100: 25 Films by Akira Kurosawa.
