= Mainichi Film Award for Best Music =

Annual Japanese film award

- Awarded for: Best music of the year
- Country: Japan
- First award: 1946

The Mainichi Film Award for Best Music is a film award given at the Mainichi Film Awards.

== Award winners ==
Year	Film	Composer
1946	Minshū no Teki	Fumio Hayasaka
1947	Joyū	Fumio Hayasaka
1948	Yoidore Tenshi; Niji o Idaku Shojo; Fuji Sanchō	Fumio Hayasaka
1949	Stray Dog	Fumio Hayasaka
1950	Kikyō	Hiroshi Yoshizawa; Toshiro Mayuzumi
1951	Fūsetsu 20-nen	Shinichi Takata
1952	The Life of Oharu; Mother; Lightning; Himitsu	Ichirō Saitō
1953	Entotsu no Mieru Basho	Yasushi Akutagawa
1954	The Garden of Women; Kono Hiroi Sora no Dokoka ni	Chūji Kinoshita
1955	Koko ni Izumi Ari	To the planner and the production staff concerned
1956	The Burmese Harp; Onibi; Mahiru no ankoku	Akira Ifukube
1957	Sun in the Last Days of the Shogunate; Kichigai Buraku	Toshiro Mayuzumi
1958	The Ballad of Narayama	Rokuzaemon Kineya; Matsunosuke Nozawa
1959	Lucky Dragon No. 5 Niguruma no Uta; Ningen no Kabe	Hikaru Hayashi
1960	The Bad Sleep Well; Chikuhō no Kodomo Tachi; Dokuritsu Gurentai Nishi e	Masaru Sato
1961	Mozu; Bad Boys	Toru Takemitsu
1962	Harakiri; Pitfall	Toru Takemitsu
1963	Bad Girl; The Insect Woman	Toshiro Mayuzumi
1964	Assassination; The Woman in the Dunes	Toru Takemitsu
1965	Tokyo Olympiad	Toshiro Mayuzumi
1966	The Face of Another; Akogare	Toru Takemitsu
1967	Chōhen Manga Shōnen Jack to Mahō Tsukai	Seiichrō Uno
1968	The Human Bullet; Gion Matsuri; Kubi	Masaru Sato
1969	The Love Suicides at Amijima	Toru Takemitsu
1970	Apart from Life	Teizo Matsumura
1971	Inn of Evil; Silence; The Ceremony	Toru Takemitsu
1972	The Long Darkness	Teizo Matsumura
1973	Seigenki Tōi Hi no Haha wa Utsukushiku	Toru Takemitsu
1974	Castle of Sand	Yasushi Akutagawa; Mitsuaki Kanno
1975	The Fossil	Toru Takemitsu
1976	The Inugami Family	Yuji Ohno
1977	The Yellow Handkerchief	Masaru Sato
1978	Empire of Passion	Toru Takemitsu
1979	Ah! Nomugi Toge	Masaru Sato
1980	Kagemusha	Shin’ichirō Ikebe
1981	Station	Ryudo Uzaki
1982	The Go Masters	Hikaru Hayashi 江定仙
1983	Merry Christmas, Mr. Lawrence	Ryuichi Sakamoto
1984	MacArthur's Children	Shin’ichirō Ikebe
1985	Sorekara; Tomo Yo, Shizuka ni Nemure	Shigeru Umebayashi
1986	House of Wedlock	Saeko Suzuki
1987	A Taxing Woman	Toshiyuki Honda
1988	Rock yo shizukani nagareyo	Hiroaki Yoshino
1989	Untamagiru	Kōji Ueno
1990	Dreams; Childhood Days	Shin’ichirō Ikebe
1991	A Scene at the Sea	Joe Hisaishi
1992	Porco Rosso; Seishun Dendeke Dekedeke	Joe Hisaishi
1993	Bloom in the Moonlight	Masaru Sato
1994	Ghost Pub; Tokarefu	Shigeru Umebayashi
1995	Maborosi	Chen Ming-chang
1996	Numuru Otoko	Toshio Hosokawa
1997	Lost Paradise	Michiru Ōshima
1998	Dr. Akagi	Yōsuke Yamashita
1999	M/Other	Haruyuki Suzuki
2000	Nabbie's Love	Kenichirō Isoda
2001	Spirited Away	Joe Hisaishi; Youmi Kimura
2002	Amidadō Dayori	Takashi Kako
2003	Hotel Hibiscus	Kenichirō Isoda
2004	Tōkō no Ki	Terumasa Hino
2005	Break Through!	Kazuhiko Katō
2006	The Professor's Beloved Equation	Takashi Kako
2007	A Gentle Breeze in the Village	Rei Harakami
2008	Children of the Dark	Taro Iwashiro
2009	Watashi wa Neko Stalker	Shigeomi Hasumi
2010	Sketches of Kaitan City	Jim O'Rourke
2011	Postcard	Hikaru Hayashi
2012	Bokutachi Kyūkō A Ressha de Ikou	Michiru Ōshima
2013	The Devil's Path	Gorō Yasukawa
2014	Lady Maiko	Yoshikazu Suo
2015	Nagasaki: Memories of My Son	Ryuichi Sakamoto
2016	In This Corner of the World	Kotringo
2017	Bangkok Nites	Soi48; Young-G
2018	And Your Bird Can Sing	Hi'Spec
2019	Weathering with You	Radwimps
2020	Midnight Swan	Keiichirō Shibuya
2021	Under the Open Sky	Masaki Hayashi
2022	This Is Amiko	Ichiko Aoba
2023	Yoko	Jim O'Rourke
2024	Evil Does Not Exist	Eiko Ishibashi
2025	Kokuho	Marihiko Hara
