= Tomoyuki Tanaka =

Japanese film producer (1910–1997)

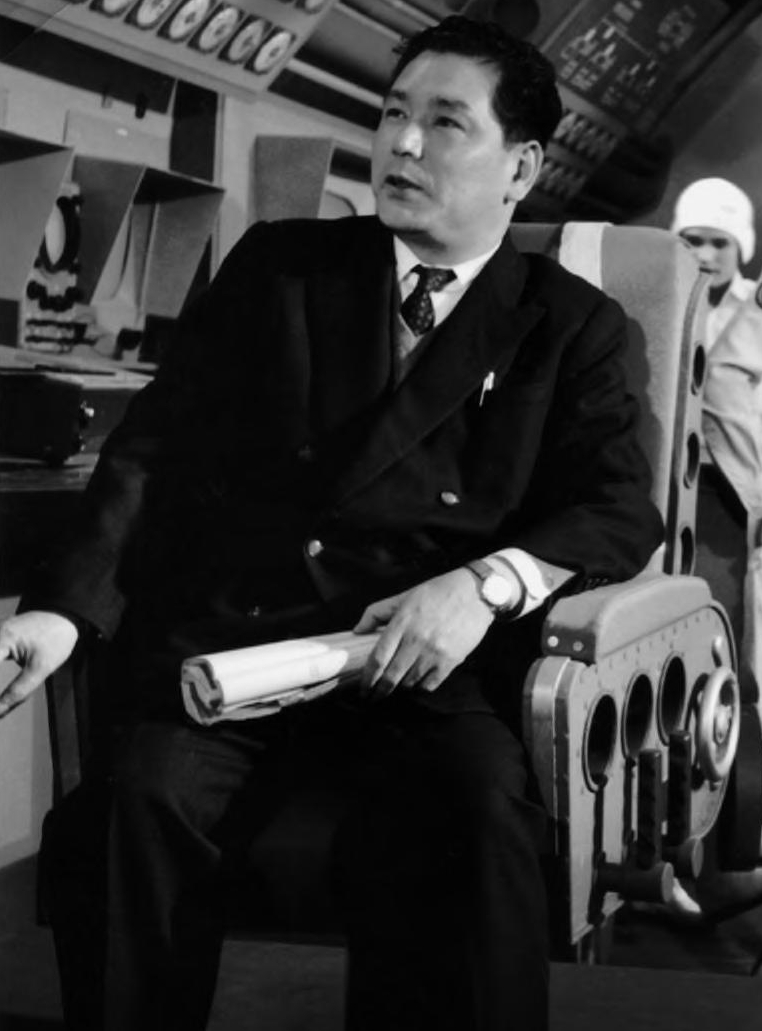
- Tanaka on the set of Battle in Outer Space in 1959
- Born: April 26, 1910; Kashiwara, Osaka, Empire of Japan
- Died: April 2, 1997 (aged 86); Tokyo, Japan
- Education: Kansai University
- Occupation: Film producer
- Years active: 1940–1997
- Spouse: Chieko Nakakita (m. 1950)
- Children: 4
- Honours: Order of the Sacred Treasure (1981)

Japanese name
- Kanji: 田中 友幸
- Hiragana: たなか ともゆき
- Romanization: Tanaka Tomoyuki

Tomoyuki "Yūkō" Tanaka (Japanese: 田中 友幸(ともゆき), Hepburn: Tanaka Tomoyuki; April 26, 1910 – April 2, 1997) was a Japanese film producer, best known as the creator of Godzilla. He produced most of the installments in the Godzilla series, beginning in 1954 with Godzilla and ending in 1995 with Godzilla vs. Destoroyah. He was one of the most prolific Japanese producers of all time, having worked on more than 200 films, including over 80 tokusatsu films and six of Akira Kurosawa's films, notably Yojimbo and Kagemusha.

== Biography ==
=== Early life ===
Tanaka was born on April 26, 1910, in Kashiwara, Osaka. As a child, he would often walk miles to the nearest theater to watch silent adventure and ninja films in the afternoons. At the age of 14, Tanaka saw the silent Western film The Covered Wagon and was so enamored by its cinematography that it remained his all-time favorite film. In his youth, Tanaka was once disowned by his parents because he focused more on his interests, films and acting, than on his studies. Tanaka studied economics at Kansai University, graduating in 1940.

=== Career ===
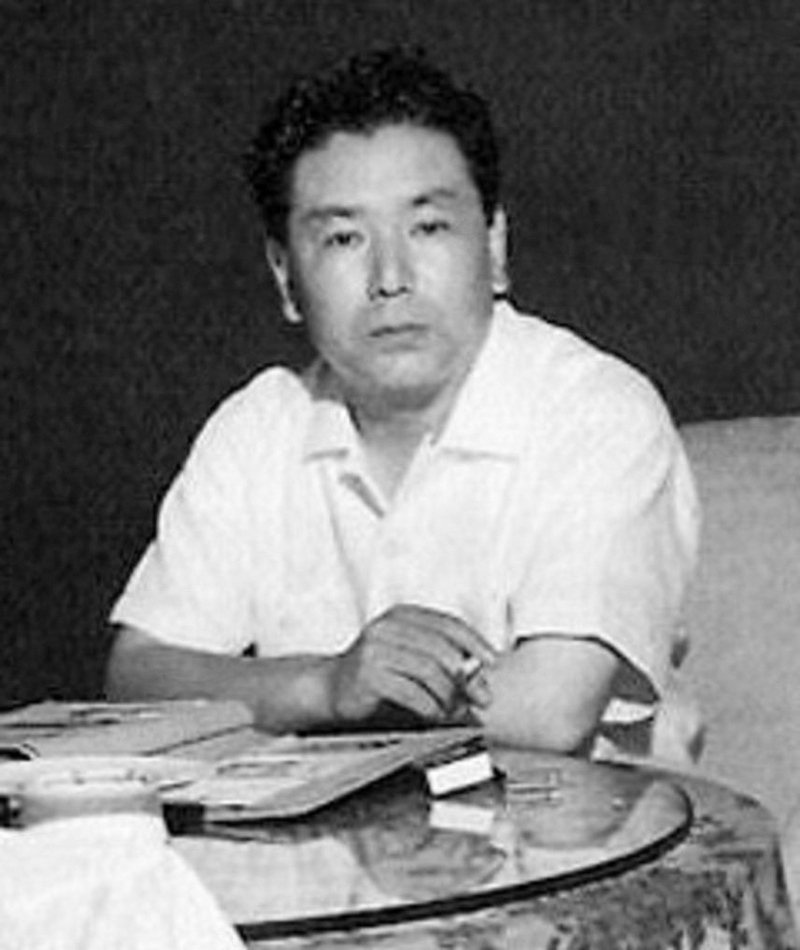
Tanaka c. 1950s

Tanaka entered the Japanese film industry in 1940, joining the film studio Taiho Eiga. The following year, Tanaka moved to Toho after it merged with Taiho Eiga and began his career as a producer under Iwao Mori. After four years with the company, he began producing his own films, and one of his first efforts, Three People of the North, was released in 1945.

Tanaka left Toho in 1947 during the Toho strikes; he would return to the company in 1952.

In 1954 Tanaka started on production of the war movie In the Shadow of Glory (栄光のかげに, Eikō no Kage ni), to be directed by Senkichi Taniguchi, co-produced with the Indonesian studio Perfini, and filmed in Jakarta. The project was cancelled when the Indonesian government refused to grant visas to the Japanese filmmakers. On the flight back to Japan from Jakarta, Tanaka wrote the outline for a new film. Inspired by King Kong, which had been re-released in Japan in 1952, as well as by The Beast from 20,000 Fathoms and the recent Daigo Fukuryū Maru incident, Tanaka wrote a daikaiju film, working title The Giant Monster from 20,000 Miles Beneath the Sea (海底二万哩から来た大怪獣, Kaitei Niman Mairu kara kita Daikaijū). Tanaka pitched the project to Iwao Mori, who approved, and work began on Godzilla.

Tanaka selected Ishirō Honda to direct Godzilla; the two had recently collaborated on Farewell Rabaul and Senkichi Taniguchi, Tanaka's first choice, had refused the job. Shigeru Kayama, a prominent detective and science fiction author, provided the treatment for Godzilla at Tanaka's request, Tanaka being a fan of Kayama's. Tanaka had worked with special effects director Eiji Tsuburaya on several earlier films; Tsuburaya was attached to Godzilla from the beginning, as his determination of the feasibility of the project was a condition for its approval.

Godzilla would spawn a series of sequels, adding up to 38 films as of March 29, 2024. Thirty-three movies have been produced by Toho, and five by the American studios TriStar Pictures and Legendary Pictures. He often worked with the other three members of the Godzilla team: Honda, Tsuburaya, and composer Akira Ifukube, to complete such works as The Mysterians (1957) and Matango (1963). he also creates manipulative aliens, causing problems for the Earth, for the purpose of political, according to the tendencies of his monster films. Tanaka also created the space-monster King Ghidorah and the innocent Minilla.

Akira Kurosawa started the Kurosawa Production Company in 1959, with Toho holding a majority stake, and closed it in 1966; during this period, Tanaka would produce all five films directed by Kurosawa: The Bad Sleep Well, Yojimbo, Sanjuro, High and Low, and Red Beard. Tanaka would later reunite with Kurosawa to produce Kagemusha (1980), which was nominated for the Academy Award for Best Foreign Language Film and won the Palme d'Or at Cannes.

Toho entered into a similar arrangement with actor Toshiro Mifune and Mifune Productions in 1962, with Tanaka assisting in the operation of the company. Tanaka produced several successful films with Mifune Productions, including Legacy of the 500,000, Samurai Assassin, and Fort Graveyard.

In 1971 Tanaka became President of the newly formed Toho Eizo, a Toho subsidiary that would create special effects for the parent company. In 1975 he became President and CEO of Toho Pictures. In 1978 Toho Eizo merged with Tokyo Eiga, a Toho affiliate; Tanaka would step down as President and become Chairman of the merged company. In 1988 Toho Eizo merged with Toho Bijutsu, another Toho subsidiary, to form Toho Eizo Bijutsu; Tanaka would step down as Chairman of Toho Eizo. In 1989 Tanaka became Chairman and CEO of Toho Pictures. In 1995 Tanaka retired from his official duties and became an advisor to Toho Pictures.

He is credited for the "original story" in Godzilla 1985.

Tanaka oversaw the production of Mitsubishi's pavilion at several expos, including the Osaka Expo, Expo '75 in Okinawa, and Expo '85 in Tsukuba.

=== Personal life ===
In 1950, Tanaka married 23-year-old actress Chieko Nakakita, with whom he later had three sons and adopted a daughter named Mieko.

== Godzilla ==
Tanaka is best known as the creator, with author Shigeru Kayama, director Ishirō Honda, screenwriter Takeo Murata, and special effects director Eiji Tsuburaya, of Godzilla, the towering embodiment of post-World War II anxiety. Tanaka created Godzilla in 1954 in an effort to illustrate the terror Japan felt after the atomic bombings of Hiroshima and Nagasaki and the recent Daigo Fukuryū Maru incident. In an interview in 1991, Tanaka summed up the symbolism of Godzilla:

Japanese people back then had a great fear of radiation, which is what gave Godzilla his enormous size. He has always stood for nature's retaliation against humanity.

== Filmography ==
=== As producer ===
Year	Title	Notes	Ref(s)
1944	Until the Day of Victory (Note: 勝利の日まで, Shōri no Hi made)	With Sanezumi Fujimoto and Sōjirō Motoki; uncredited	
1945	Legend of the Great Japanese Swordsman (Note: 日本剣豪伝, Nihon kengō-den)		
1945	Three People of the North (Note: 北の三人, Kita no san-nin)		
1946	Cheerful Woman (Note: 陽気な女, Yōkina on'na)		
1946	Those Who Make Tomorrow (Note: 明日を創る人々, Asu o tsukuru hitobito)		
1946	As Long as I Live (Note: 命ある限り, Inochi aru kagiri)		
1946	Eleven Schoolgirls (Note: 十一人の女学生, Juichinin no jogakusei)		
1946	Declaration of Love (Note: 愛の宣書, Ai no sen-sho)		
1947	Four Love Stories (Note: 四つの恋の物語, Yottsu no koi no monogatari)	With Keiji Matsuzaki	
1947	24 Hours of a Secret Life (Note: 地下街二十四時間, Chikagai nijuyojikan)		
1947	Snow Trail (Note: 銀嶺の果て, Ginrei no Hate)		
1948	My Love on the Other Side of the Mountains (Note: わが愛は山の彼方に, Waga ai wa yama no kanata ni)		
1949	Lady from Hell (Note: 地獄の貴婦人, Jigoku no kifujin)	With Keiji Matsuzaki	
1949	Senta Was Cut		
1949	Jakoman and Tetsu (Note: ジャコ萬と鉄, Jakoman to Tetsu)		
1950	Escape at Dawn (Note: 暁の脱走, Akatsuki no dassō)		
1950	The Gold of the Devil (Note: 魔の黄金, Ma no kogane)	With Sōjirō Motoki	
1950	The Angry Street (Note: 怒りの街, Ikari no machi lit. 'The City of Rage')		
1950	White Beast (Note: 白い野獣, Shiroi Yajū)		
1950	Pursuit at Dawn (Note: 暁の追跡, Akatsuki no tsuiseki)		
1950	The Gate of Tokyo		
1951	Beyond Love and Hate		
1951	A White Orchid		
1951	Who is to Judge Me?		
1951	Hakamadare Yasusuke		
1951	Cliff of Death		
1951	Equatorial Festival		
1952	Foghorn		
1952	My Son's Bride		
1952	Sword for Hire		
1952	The Lady from Shanghai		
1952	Adolescence		
1952	A Swift Current		
1952	The Man Who Came to Port		
1953	My Wonderful Yellow Car		
1953	Embrace		
1953	Yasugorō Succeeds		
1953	Mother and Daughter		
1953	Adolescence Part II		
1953	Youth of Heiji Senigata		
1953	Red-Light Bases		
1954	Farewell Rabaul		
1954	Itsuko and Her Mother		
1954	Forever Be Mine		
1954	The Surf		
1954	Godzilla		
1955	Godzilla Raids Again		
1955	Oen-san		
1955	Lovetide		
1955	Love Never Fails		
1955	Half Human		
1955	Asunaro monogatari		
1956	The Legend of the White Serpent		
1956	Barefoot Youth		
1956	Rodan		
1957	Untamed		
1957	The Last Escape		
1957	The Mysterians		
1957	Yagyu Secret Scrolls		
1958	The H-Man		
1958	Varan the Unbelievable		
1958	Rickshaw Man		
1959	The Three Treasures	with Sanezumi Fujimoto	
1959	Battle in Outer Space		
1959	Life of an Expert Swordsman		
1960	The Secret of the Telegian		
1960	The Human Vapor		
1960	The Bad Sleep Well		
1960	The Last Gunfight		
1961	Yojimbo		
1961	Mothra		
1961	The Story of Osaka Castle		
1961	The Merciless Trap		
1962	Sanjuro		
1962	Gorath		
1962	King Kong vs. Godzilla		
1962	Chūshingura: Hana no Maki, Yuki no Maki		
1963	Atragon		
1963	High and Low		
1963	Warring Clans		
1963	Matango		
1963	Legacy of the 500,000		
1963	The Lost World of Sinbad		
1964	Mothra vs. Godzilla		
1964	Ghidorah, the Three-Headed Monster		
1964	Dogora		
1964	Whirlwind		
1965	Frankenstein vs. Baragon		
1965	Invasion of Astro-Monster		
1965	Red Beard		
1965	Samurai Assassin		
1965	Ironfinger		
1965	Key of Keys		
1965	Fort Graveyard		
1966	The War of the Gargantuas	with Kenichiro Tsunoda	
1966	Ebirah, Horror of the Deep		
1967	King Kong Escapes		
1967	Son of Godzilla		
1967	Samurai Rebellion		
1967	Japan's Longest Day		
1968	Destroy All Monsters		
1968	Kill!		
1968	Admiral Yamamoto		
1968	Judge and Jeopardy		
1969	All Monsters Attack		
1969	Samurai Banners		
1969	Battle of the Japan Sea		
1969	Portrait of Hell		
1970	Space Amoeba		
1970	The Vampire Doll		
1971	Godzilla vs. Hedorah		
1972	Godzilla vs. Gigan		
1973	Godzilla vs. Megalon		
1973	Submersion of Japan	with Osamu Tanaka	
1974	Godzilla vs. Mechagodzilla		
1974	Prophecies of Nostradamus		
1974	ESPY	with Fumio Tanaka	
1975	Terror of Mechagodzilla		
1976	Zero Pilot		
1976	House		
1980	Kagemusha		
1981	Imperial Navy		
1984	The Return of Godzilla		
1987	Princess from the Moon		
1989	Gunhed		
1989	Godzilla vs. Biollante	with Shōgo Tomiyama	
1994	Godzilla vs. SpaceGodzilla	with Shōgo Tomiyama	
1995	Godzilla vs. Destoroyah	with Shōgo Tomiyama	

== Notes ==
Preceded by Sanezumi Fujimoto	President of Toho Pictures; 1975–1981	Succeeded by Yoshinobu Hayashi
