= Rangiku monogatari =

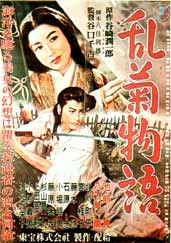
- Japanese movie poster
- Directed by: Senkichi Taniguchi
- Screenplay by: Toshio Yasumi
- Story by: Jun'ichirō Tanizaki
- Produced by: Tomoyuki Tanaka
- Starring: Yū Fujiki; Ryō Ikebe; Kaoru Yachigusa
- Cinematography: Tadashi Iimura
- Edited by: Yoshitami Kuroiwa
- Music by: Ikuma Dan
- Production company: Toho
- Distributed by: Toho
- Release date: January 22, 1956 (Japan)
- Running time: 96 minutes
- Country: Japan
- Language: Japanese

Rangiku monogatari (Japanese: 乱菊物語), also known as The Maiden Courtesan, is a 1956 black-and-white Japanese film directed by Senkichi Taniguchi.

== Cast ==
- Yū Fujiki
- Ryō Ikebe
- Kaoru Yachigusa
