= Foghorn (film) =

1952 film by Senkichi Taniguchi

- Theatrical release poster
- Directed by: Senkichi Taniguchi
- Screenplay by: Senkichi Taniguchi; Toshio Yasumi
- Based on: A novel by Jirō Osaragi
- Produced by: Tomoyuki Tanaka
- Starring: Shirley Yamaguchi; Toshiro Mifune; Bob Booth; Fuyuki Murakami; Noriko Sengoku
- Cinematography: Masao Tamai
- Music by: Ichirō Saitō; Nobuo Iida
- Distributed by: Toho
- Release date: March 3, 1952 (Japan)
- Running time: 99 minutes
- Country: Japan
- Language: Japanese

Foghorn (Japanese: 霧笛, Hepburn: Muteki) is a 1952 Japanese drama film directed by Senkichi Taniguchi. It stars Shirley Yamaguchi and Toshirō Mifune. It was produced by Toho Studios. The film, based on a novel by Jirō Osaragi, which was previously filmed in 1934 by Minoru Murata, is about a Japanese woman, the lover of an American, who falls in love with her servant.

== Cast ==
- Shirley Yamaguchi as Chiyo (Hana)
- Toshiro Mifune as Chiyokichi
- Bob Booth as Takashi Shimura
- Fuyuki Murakami
- Noriko Sengoku
