= Foghorn (disambiguation) =

A foghorn is a navigation aid at sea.

Foghorn may also refer to:

- "The Fog Horn", a 1951 science-fiction short story by Ray Bradbury
- "The Foghorn", a 1933 semi-horrific short story by Gertrude Atherton
- Foghorn Leghorn, a cartoon rooster that appears in the Looney Tunes and Merrie Melodies series
- Foghorn (film), a 1952 Japanese drama film
- "Foghorn", song by the band A from their 1997 album How Ace Are Buildings
