= Something Like an Autobiography =

1981 autobiography by Akira Kurosawa

- First edition cover
- Author: Akira Kurosawa
- Original title: 蝦蟇の油 自伝のようなもの
- Translator: Audie E. Bock
- Language: Japanese
- Publisher: Iwanami Shoten
- Publication date: 1981
- Publication place: Japan
- English publication date: 1983
- Pages: 240
- ISBN: 9784000003049

Something Like an Autobiography (Japanese: 蝦蟇の油 自伝のようなもの, Hepburn: Gama no Abura: Jiden no Yō na Mono) is the memoir of Japanese film director Akira Kurosawa. It was published by Iwanami Shoten in 1981, and translated into English by Audie E. Bock the following year.

== Sources ==
In 1980, inspired by the memoir of one of his heroes, Jean Renoir, Kurosawa began to publish in serial form his autobiography, entitled Gama no Abura ("Toad Oil"; a traditional Japanese ointment for medical purposes). In English translations, the book's subtitle Jiden no Yō na Mono ("Something Like an Autobiography") is normally used as the title instead. The book deals with the period from the director's birth to his winning the Golden Lion for Rashomon from the Venice Film Festival in 1951; the period from 1951 through 1980 is not covered. The title of the book is a reference to a legend according to which, if one places a deformed toad in a box full of mirrors, it will become so afraid of its own reflection that it will begin to sweat, and this sweat allegedly had medicinal properties. Kurosawa compared himself to the toad, nervous about having to contemplate, through the process of writing his life story, his own multiple "reflections."

== Synopsis ==
The book has 54 chapters that trace Kurosawa's early childhood through his teenage years, where he recollects memories of his schooldays, times spent with his elder brother, the great Great Kantō earthquake, the destruction left in its aftermath and the Kantō massacre (p. 51).

At the age of 25, shortly after his older brother Heigo committed suicide, Kurosawa responded to an advertisement for recruiting new assistant directors at the film studio Photo Chemical Laboratories, known as P.C.L. (which later became the major studio, Toho) and was subsequently accepted for the position with four others.

During his five years as an assistant director, Kurosawa worked under numerous directors, but by far the most important figure in his development was Kajiro Yamamoto. Of his 24 films as A.D., he worked on 17 under Yamamoto. Yamamoto nurtured Kurosawa's talent, promoting him directly from third assistant director to chief assistant director after a year. Kurosawa's responsibilities increased, and he worked at tasks ranging from stage construction and film development to location scouting, script polishing, rehearsals, lighting, dubbing, editing and second-unit directing. In the last of Kurosawa's films as an assistant director, Horse (1941), Kurosawa took over most of the production, as Yamamoto was occupied with the shooting of another film.

In the later part of the book, Kurosawa recounts the production of his early films as director, including Sanshiro Sugata, The Most Beautiful, Drunken Angel, Stray Dog, and Rashomon.
