= Fumio Hayasaka =

Japanese composer (1914–1955)

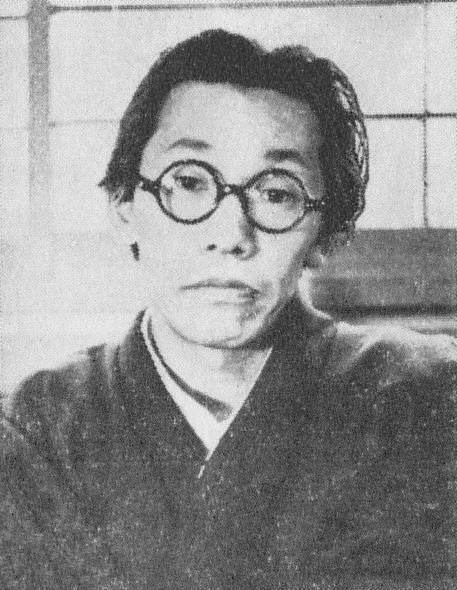
- Born: August 19, 1914; Sendai, Miyagi Prefecture, Empire of Japan
- Died: October 15, 1955 (aged 41); Setagaya, Tokyo, Japan
- Other name: 早坂 文雄
- Occupation: Composer

Fumio Hayasaka (早坂 文雄, Hayasaka Fumio; August 19, 1914 – October 15, 1955) was a Japanese composer of classical music and film scores.

== Early life ==
Hayasaka was born in the city of Sendai on the main Japanese island of Honshū. In 1918, Hayasaka and his family moved to Sapporo on the northern island of Hokkaidō. In 1933, Hayasaka and Akira Ifukube organized the New Music League, which held a new music festival the year after.

Hayasaka won a number of prizes for his early concert works; in 1935, his piece Futatsu no sanka e no zensōkyoku won first prize in a radio competition, and another concert piece, Kodai no bukyoku, won the 1938 Weingartner Prize. Other early works include a Nocturne (1936) for piano and the orchestral Ancient Dance (1938). In 1939, Hayasaka moved to Tokyo to begin a career as film composer. By early 1940, Hayasaka was seen as "a major composer for Japanese Cinema".

== Post-War film music ==
After the war, Hayasaka continued working on films, quickly winning recognition for his abilities. In 1946, he received the film music award for An Enemy of the People (Minshū no Teki, 1946) at the first annual Mainichi Film Awards. The year after, 1947, Hayasaka received the Mainichi film music award for Teinosuke Kinugasa's Actress (Joyu).

In the late 1940s, Hayasaka invited his friend Akira Ifukube to write film music with him at Toho Studios. Ifukube's first film score for Toho was for Senkichi Taniguchi's Snow Trail (Ginrei no hate) in 1947. Toshirō Mifune, who later starred in most of Kurosawa's films, first met Kurosawa at a pre-screening of this movie.

On 22 June 1948 a concerto by Fumio Hayasaka was premiered in Tokyo with Hiroshi Kajiwara as soloist on the grand piano and the Toho Symphony Orchestra (today's Tokyo Symphony Orchestra) under Masashi Ueda.

== Relationship with Akira Kurosawa ==
Fumio Hayasaka had a celebrated association with the pre-eminent Japanese director Akira Kurosawa which was short-lived due to Hayasaka's early death. The 1948 film Drunken Angel (Yoidore tenshi) was the first film directed by Akira Kurosawa that Hayasaka composed music for. The director and composer collaborated to test "oppositional handling of music and performance". Their collaboration turned into a very deep artistic relationship, with Hayasaka contributing ideas to the visual part of the film. In his autobiography, Kurosawa would say that working with Hayasaka changed his views on how film music should be used; from then on, he viewed music as "counterpoint" to the image and not just an "accompaniment". This is also the first film that Kurosawa used Toshiro Mifune as an actor.

Among the films Hayasaka scored for Kurosawa are Stray Dog (1949), Rashomon (1950), Ikiru (1952) and Seven Samurai (1954). During the 1950s, Hayasaka also composed the scores for some of the final works of another Japanese director, Kenji Mizoguchi. Hayasaka composed music for Ugetsu (1953), Sansho the Bailiff (1954), and The Crucified Lovers (1954).

The 1950 film Rashomon was especially significant for Hayasaka. This film won the 1951 Golden Lion from the Venice film festival, and is considered the first Japanese film to be widely seen in the West. In the Japanese film culture, directors normally wanted music that sounded like well-known Western works; Kurosawa specifically had asked Hayasaka to compose music that sounded like Maurice Ravel's Boléro. Masaru Satō, then a young composer, was so impressed with the music that he decided to study with Hayasaka. This film was also related to the atomic scar of the Japanese culture; although the American occupation forces forbade the Japanese media from "criticizing America's role in the tragedy" of Hiroshima and Nagasaki, Rashomon depicts a historical era of Japan where her cities are in ruin and social chaos abounds.

Hayasaka was continually productive in the years leading up to his death. In 1950, he founded the Association of Film Music. The 1953 film Ugetsu, directed by Kenji Mizoguchi, featured a score by Hayasaka; the film won the silver prize at the 1953 Venice Film Festival. The year after, 1954, Hayasaka did another Mizoguchi film, the jidai-geki Sansho the Bailiff (Sansho dayu). This film shared the 1954 Silver Lion prize from the Venice Film Festival with Kazan's On the Waterfront, Fellini's La Strada, and Kurosawa's Seven Samurai.

Seven Samurai, a Kurosawa jidai-geki film, also features music by Hayasaka. At the time, it was the largest Japanese film production ever. This film featured strong directorial music choices that are closely related to Western symphonic concert music. Masaru Sato assisted with the orchestration of Hayasaka's score. This score utilized the leitmotif, which is a method of compositional organization borrowed from western operas.

During his time in Tokyo, Hayasaka also wrote several notable concert works including Ancient Dances of the Left and on the Right (1941), a Piano Concerto (1948) and the orchestral suite Yukara (1955).

Hayasaka served as a musical mentor to both Masaru Satō and Tōru Takemitsu.

== Death ==
In 1955, Hayasaka died of tuberculosis in Tokyo at the age of 41. He died while working on the score for I Live in Fear (Record of a Living Being, Ikimono no kiroku), so Masaru Sato completed the score. The depth of the relationship between Hayasaka and Kurosawa is shown in that this film was based on a conversation between the two friends. Hayasaka was very ill at the time, and pondering the fear of his own death. Weak and sickly from TB, he told Kurosawa that "with this illness threatening my life, I can't work." Kurosawa was deeply affected by his friend's death and "fell into a deep depression". The film Record of a Living Being combined his depression and the Japanese atomic scar to create a film that illustrates the "human experience in the atomic age".

== Influence on other composers ==
Akira Ifukube, influenced by Hayasaka to work with films, scored Toho Studio's Godzilla, sealing his fame as a composer of music for Japanese horror films. This movie was another of a series of postwar films that displayed a Japanese fear of the effects of atomic weapons.

After finishing Hayasaka's score for I Live in Fear, Masuro Sato went on to score seven more films by Kurosawa. Keeping with Hayasaka's western-orchestral influence, for Kurosawa's 1957 jidai-geki film, Throne of Blood (Kumonosu-jo), Sato composed a score that also borrows from the western composer Verdi. Sato continued to use demonstrate deep western influences through the rest of his career, making his scores (and the films they accompany) "especially accessible to non-Oriental listeners". This was another film of Kurosawa's that indirectly alluded to the atomic bombs, being set in "a period after cataclysmic destruction to a center of Japanese life and political power".

In his memory, as an homage, Tōru Takemitsu wrote his Requiem for strings in 1957.

== Musical style ==
Hayasaka's early musical style was late-Romantic with influences of traditional Japanese music. In the years before his death his style drifted towards atonality and modernism. Keeping with tradition and the demands of film makers, while scoring for films his music was closely related to (and often borrowed from) western orchestral music.

== Selected list of classical works ==
=== Orchestral works ===
- Prelude for Two Hymns (1936)
- Ancient Dance (1938)
- Overture in D (1939)
- Adagio for strings (1940)
- Ancient Dances on the Left and on the Right (1941)
- The Tale of the Tree of Muku (1946)
- Piano Concerto (1948)
- Metamorphosis for orchestra (1953)
- Yukara (1955)

=== Chamber/instrumental works ===
- Kunshi no Iori, for piano (1934)
- Nocturne No. 1, for piano (1937)
- Piano Pieces for Chamber (1941)
- Four unaccompanied songs to poems by Haruo Sato for solo soprano (1944)
- Romance, for Piano
- Nocturne No. 2, for piano (1947)
- Autumn, for piano (1947)
- String Quartet (1950)
- Suite in Seven Parts (1952)
