= Those Who Make Tomorrow =

- Theatrical release poster
- Directed by: Akira Kurosawa; Hideo Sekigawa; Kajirō Yamamoto
- Written by: Yusaku Yamagata; Kajirō Yamamoto
- Produced by: Keiji Matsuzaki; Sōjirō Motoki; Ryo Takei; Tomoyuki Tanaka
- Starring: Susumu Fujita; Hideko Takamine
- Cinematography: Takeo Itō; Taiichi Kankura; Mitsuo Miura
- Music by: Noboru Itō
- Distributed by: Toho
- Release date: 1 May 1946 (Japan)
- Running time: 82 minutes
- Country: Japan
- Language: Japanese

Those Who Make Tomorrow (Japanese: 明日を創る人々, Hepburn: Asu o Tsukuru Hitobito) is a 1946 Japanese film directed by Akira Kurosawa, Hideo Sekigawa and Kajirō Yamamoto (who was also co-writer).

== Purpose ==
The film was produced to illustrate the purpose of the workers' union at the Toho film studios, as the Allied Forces endorsed the formation of unions as part of the democratisation process during the post-World War II Occupation of Japan. Toho's studio stars Hideko Takamine and Susumu Fujita appear playing themselves.

== Plot ==
The sisters Chieko, a script girl working at a big film studio, and Aiko, a revue dancer, are daughters to anti-unionist father Gintarō. When the workers at a railway company, including the family's subtenant Seizo, go on strike, Chieko and her co-workers demonstrate their solidarity and call for a strike to achieve financial security for the film studio's staff.

Meanwhile, Aiko and her dancing troupe decide to get organised in opposition to the theatre's mean stage manager. When Gintarō is fired together with a large group of employees at his company, he finally gives up his reluctance and joins the unionists, impressed by their earnestness.

== Cast ==
- Susumu Fujita – Fujita
- Hideko Takamine – Takamine
- Kenji Susukida – Gintarō Okamoto, father
- Masayuki Mori – Seizō Hori, chauffeur
- Chieko Takehisa – Kin Okamoto, mother
- Takashi Shimura – Theatre manager
- Yonosuke Toba – Okamoto's colleague
- Masao Shimizu – Section chief
- Hyō Kitazawa – Director
- Chieko Nakakita – Yoshiko
- Mitsue Tashibana – Aiko

== Background ==
As a result of the first strike by the Toho labor union in March 1946, a production administration committee was established, allowing the union to take part in decision-making. At the suggestion of the Allied Forces' Civil Information and Education Section, the film was planned by the union, produced in a week, and released on International Workers' Day, the celebration of which had been banned in Japan since 1936. Kurosawa later distanced himself from the film, calling it "an excellent example of why a committee-made film is no good," and refused to mention it in his autobiography.

== Reception ==
Critical and commercial reception of the film was not positive. Kyuichi Tokuda, chairman of the Japanese Communist Party, called the film "too intellectualized and uninteresting".

== Legacy ==
Those Who Make Tomorrow was screened as part of a retrospective on actress Hideko Takamine by the National Museum of Modern Art, Tokyo in 2004.
