= Drunken Angel =

1948 film by Akira Kurosawa

- Theatrical release poster
- Directed by: Akira Kurosawa
- Screenplay by: Keinosuke Uekusa; Akira Kurosawa
- Produced by: Sōjirō Motoki
- Starring: Takashi Shimura; Toshiro Mifune; Reizaburo Yamamoto; Noriko Sengoku
- Cinematography: Takeo Itō
- Edited by: Akikazu Kōno
- Music by: Fumio Hayasaka
- Production company: Toho
- Distributed by: Toho
- Release date: April 27, 1948 (Japan)
- Running time: 98 minutes
- Country: Japan
- Language: Japanese

Drunken Angel (Japanese: 醉いどれ天使, Hepburn: Yoidore Tenshi) is a 1948 Japanese yakuza film directed by Akira Kurosawa and co-written by Kurosawa and Keinosuke Uekusa. Produced by Toho and starring Takashi Shimura and Toshiro Mifune, it tells the story of the alcoholic doctor Sanada and his yakuza patient Matsunaga. Sanada tries to save Matsunaga from illness and the corruption brought about by the crime in the community while Matsunaga finds himself gradually sidelined within the syndicate and becomes increasingly self-destructive. The film was the first to depict the post-Second World War yakuza and is generally considered to be Kurosawa's first major work.

During the writing of the screenplay Kurosawa and Uekusa clashed over Uekusa's growing sympathies with the yakuza due to his regular meetings with a life-model to study for the character Matsunaga. Production began in 1947 amid a series of labour disputes in the Toho company. Filming lasted from November of that year to March 10, 1948. During production, Kurosawa encountered a number of setbacks, including the death of his father in February 1948. The film was the first of sixteen collaborations between Kurosawa and Mifune, and the first collaboration between Kurosawa and Fumio Hayasaka. Kurosawa's work on Drunken Angel prompted him to think more about the relationship between music and image in film.

Despite facing censorship from the Civil Information and Education Section of the Allied occupation government, the film was released in Japan on April 27, 1948, to generally positive reviews. The film won awards for Best Film from Kinema Junpo and Mainichi Shimbun. After the international success of Rashomon (1950) at the 1951 Venice Film Festival, Toho promoted the film abroad. Analyses of Drunken Angel have looked at the pairing of multiple characters and their interactions in the postwar environment, with discussions focussing on the morality of its characters (the titular 'drunken angel'), intertextual references to the novels of Fyodor Dostoevsky and contemporary noir fiction, and the symbolic meaning of the sump—a kind of open cesspool—seen throughout much of the film.

== Plot ==
Sanada is an alcoholic doctor living in a shanty town next to an open sump. He treats a small-time yakuza named Matsunaga—who was injured in a gunfight with a rival syndicate—despite his dislike of organised crime. Sanada diagnoses Matsunaga with tuberculosis; Matsunaga's initially violent reaction is interrupted by the arrival of Sanada's nurse Miyo. The following day Sanada goes to the local black market, which Matsunaga controls. He finds Matsunaga at a bar and attempts to persuade him to give up drinking and smoking; Matsunaga kicks him out. Sanada and Miyo discuss the imminent release from prison of Matsunaga's fellow yakuza and sworn brother Okada, who is also Miyo's abusive ex-boyfriend. Sanada continues treating other patients, including a high school student making progress against her tuberculosis. After some pestering, Matsunaga agrees to listen to the doctor's advice and quit drinking.

However, with Okada's release, Matsunaga quickly succumbs to peer pressure and slips back into his old habits with his fellow yakuza. Angered at the betrayal of his commitment to Matsunaga's treatment, Sanada rebukes him. Matsunaga finds himself gradually displaced within the yakuza syndicate, and after losing a large amount of money to Okada playing chō-han, he collapses and is taken to Sanada's clinic for the evening. Distressed as his lover leaves him for Okada and his illness takes a turn for the worse, Matsunaga leaves his apartment and is confronted by Sanada at the sump. Sanada implores Matsunaga to continue his treatment, while Matsunaga has a vision of his own corpse trying to kill him. Okada shows up at the clinic and threatens to kill the doctor if he does not tell him where to find Miyo, but Matsunaga intervenes and persuades him to leave, realising that his sworn brother cannot be trusted.

Hoping to resolve the issue, Matsunaga goes to the home of the boss of his syndicate, but overhears a discussion in which the boss tells Okada he intends to order Matsunaga to sacrifice him as a pawn in the war against a rival syndicate. Distressed and self-destructive, Matsunaga orders a drink from Gin, a local barmaid, who tries to persuade him to leave the slum with her and seek treatment in the countryside. The boss returns control of the black market to Okada, who orders the storeowners in his territory to refuse service to Matsunaga. He goes to Okada's apartment; there, he finds his sworn brother with his former lover, and angrily tries to stab Okada. While they are fighting Matsunaga starts to cough up blood. The two wrestle each other on the floor in spilled paint until Okada stabs Matsunaga in the chest, and the latter stumbles outside before he succumbs to his wounds and dies.

Okada is later arrested for the murder, and the boss collects money for his aid, but refuses to pay for Matsunaga's funeral. Gin, who had feelings for Matsunaga, pays for it instead and tells Sanada that she plans to take Matsunaga's ashes to be buried on her father's farm, where she had invited him to live with her. The doctor retorts that while he understands how she feels, he cannot forgive Matsunaga for throwing his life away. His student patient arrives and reveals that her tuberculosis is cured. The doctor happily leads her to the market to buy her the anmitsu he promised to treat her to once she was well.

== Cast ==
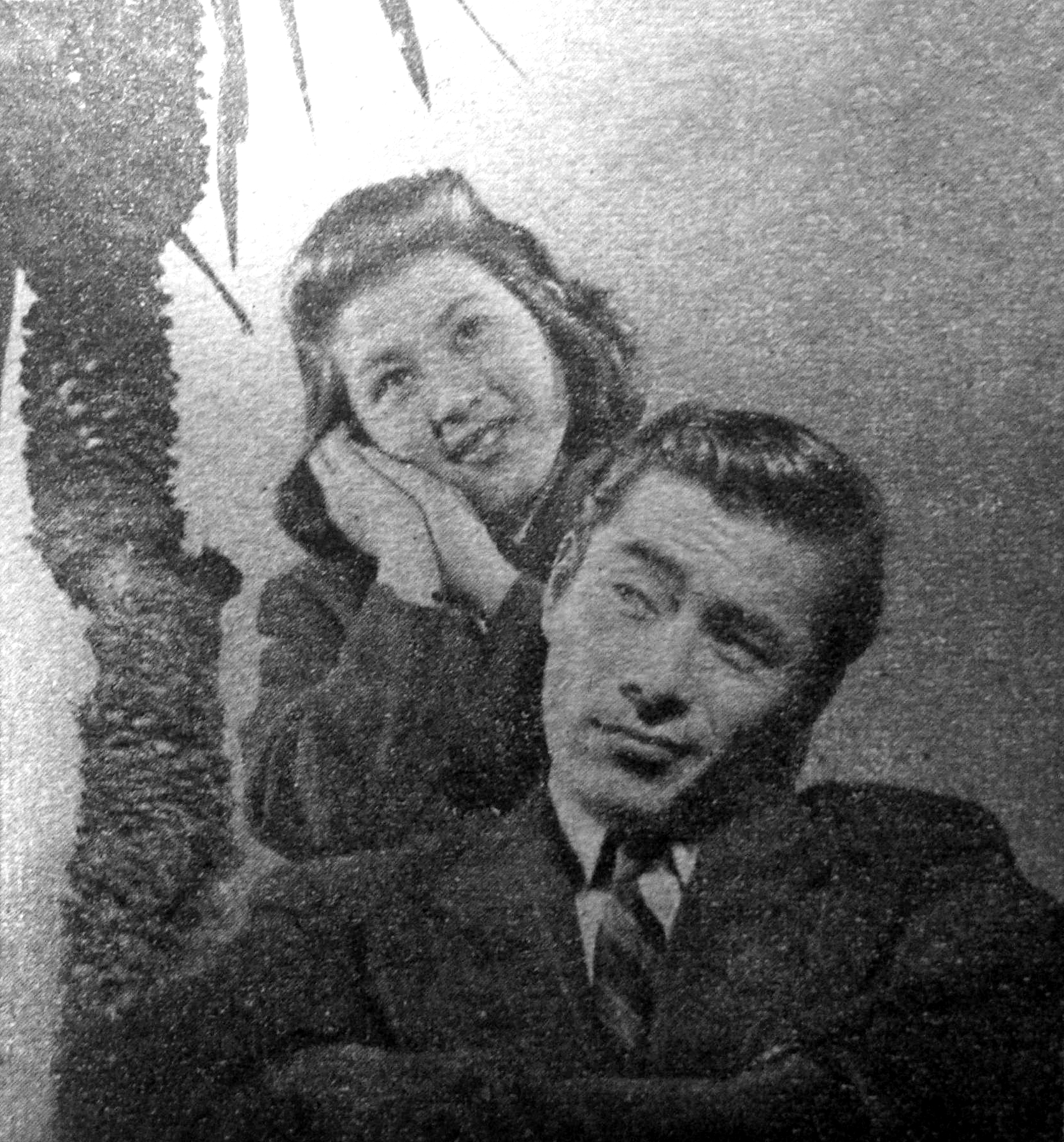
Toshiro Mifune (bottom) and Yoshiko Kuga in a publicity shot for the film

- Takashi Shimura as Doctor Sanada (真田)
- Toshiro Mifune as Matsunaga (松永)
- Reizaburo Yamamoto as Okada (岡田)
- Michiyo Kogure as Nanae (奈々江)
- Chieko Nakakita as Nurse Miyo (美代)
- Eitarō Shindō as Takahama (高浜)
- Noriko Sengoku as Gin (ぎん)
- Shizuko Kasagi as singer
- Masao Shimizu as Oyabun
- Yoshiko Kuga as schoolgirl

== Production ==
=== Development ===
Drunken Angel was made in the context of a series of labour disputes with the Toho company, a major Japanese film studio. The powerful trade union had managed the production of films, with Kurosawa's prior works No Regrets for Our Youth (1946) and One Wonderful Sunday (1947) requiring the approval of the union. By the end of 1947, the union's influence had waned following a series of less profitable Toho releases. As a result, Kurosawa was able to produce the film with minimal interference from the studio and its union. Kurosawa co-wrote the film with his childhood friend Keinosuke Uekusa in their second and last collaboration. While staying at an inn at the seaside resort Atami, Kurosawa noticed that the prow of a sunken concrete ship was being used as a diving board by local children. Seeing it as an apt metaphor for Japan's defeat in the Second World War, this image became the open sump—a kind of cesspool—seen in Drunken Angel. Kurosawa intended the film to report on—and denounce—the growing power of the yakuza in postwar Japan.

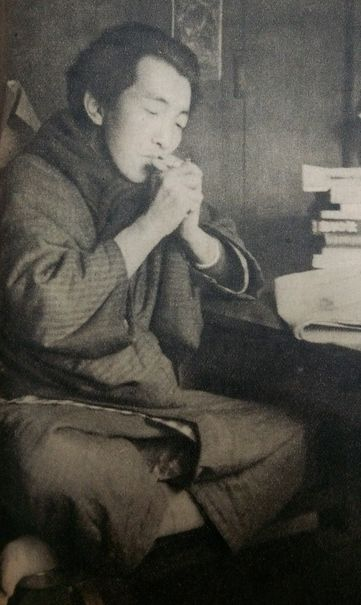
Keinosuke Uekusa in 1948

During writing of the screenplay, Uekusa met up with a member of the yakuza to develop the character of Matsunaga. While he and Kurosawa had intended for his counterpart to be a morally upright humanistic young doctor, the character was difficult to conceptualise and was changed when the two remembered an encounter they had with an unlicensed alcoholic doctor in Tokyo's black market district. Having spent five days prior to the doctor's change in character unsure of how to progress the script, they finished writing the film in about one session. However, Uekusa's meetings with the yakuza character model caused him to sympathise with their way of life to the degree that he and Kurosawa eventually argued. Despite the speed with which the two of them finished the script, Kurosawa recalled the two of them sharing a rocky relationship during its development. Although they remained friends, they did not collaborate again after completing the script.

=== Pre-production and production ===
Pre-production began in November 1947. Toshiro Mifune was cast after Kurosawa saw his performances in Snow Trail (1947) and Kajirō Yamamoto's These Foolish Times (1947). Kurosawa had seen Mifune's audition to work at the Toho company in 1946 and had directly intervened in the hiring process in order to secure Mifune a position; the panel had wrongly interpreted the actor's wild behaviour during the audition as disrespect. Drunken Angel became the first of their sixteen collaborations. This was also the first film where Kurosawa worked with Yoshiro Muraki. The film was built around a pre-existing set, used in These Foolish Times. This set was of a shopping street with a black market, which Kurosawa credits for the origin of his interest in dissecting the character of yakuza gang members.

The film was produced by Toho and shot in black-and-white. Filming began in November 1947. During the course of production, Kurosawa faced a number of personal and professional problems. Toho executives pressured Kurosawa to finish production quickly, anxious to see more films in cinemas before any more potential strikes, and actress Keiko Orihara became ill shortly into production—she was replaced by Chieko Nakakita in January 1948. Additionally, in February, Kurosawa's father Isamu died at the age of 83. Kurosawa was under pressure to complete the film during the final weeks of shooting, and was unable to return to Akita Prefecture to be with his father.

Takashi Shimura loosely based his character of the doctor on the performance of Thomas Mitchell in Stagecoach (1939). Despite Shimura's role as the protagonist, Kurosawa later expressed difficulty in being able to contain Mifune's performance as the gangster so that he did not dominate the film with his screen presence. Kurosawa also praised the acting of Reizaburo Yamamoto, although he described being too afraid to approach him for some time due to his "frightening eyes". Filming ended on March 10, 1948. A 150-minute cut of Drunken Angel was made but never released; the film's negatives and remaining prints are of the 98-minute cut.

=== Music ===
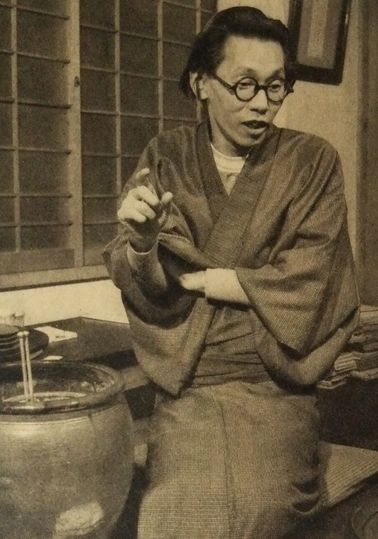
Composer Fumio Hayasaka in 1955

Drunken Angel marked Kurosawa's first collaboration with composer Fumio Hayasaka. The two agreed on much of the film's composition. Kurosawa wrote memos (published in the April 1948 edition of Eiga Shunshu) that detailed his changing attitude towards the use of music in his films, becoming more conscious of its inclusion by matching it to parts of the script during the film's writing. For Okada's introductory scene, Kurosawa and Hayasaka wanted to use the song "Mack the Knife" from The Threepenny Opera, but found that it was copyrighted and the studio was unwilling to pay for the rights. The use of cheerful-sounding song "The Cuckoo Waltz" was designed to juxtapose the film's low-point of Matsunaga being rejected from different neighbourhood establishments. Kurosawa thought to use this song when, on the day he received news of his father's death, he heard the music over a loudspeaker and found that it intensified his own grief. According to Stuart Galbraith IV, the director and composer shook hands after discovering that they had had the same idea separately but simultaneously. The film's sound recorder was Wataru Konuma.

=== Occupation censorship ===
At the time of Drunken Angel's production, the Allied occupation government imposed restrictions on Japanese cinema. Films were encouraged to promote individual liberties and Japan's demilitarisation, while forbidden from promoting nationalistic or feudal values. From 1946, the Civil Information and Education Section enforced a double censorship of completed scripts during pre-production and completed films following the final edit. The occupation's censors required Kurosawa to rewrite several portions of the film mostly due to ethical concerns; for example, a mention of suicide was cut, and complaints were made concerning the film's frank depiction of prostitution and black markets. The film's ending was also changed; originally the doctor Sanada drove Matsunaga's corpse around the Tokyo slum. Matsunaga's manner of death also underwent several re-writes, with different characters responsible in different drafts.

== Themes ==
=== Postwar dual identity ===
In his study of Kurosawa's filmography, Galbraith sees the gangster Matsunaga and Doctor Sanada as linked by their illness. To Sanada, Matsunaga stands for both the "chaotic temptations of postwar Japan"—which the doctor relates to his own past behaviour—and the corrupt criminality of the period's social chaos that Sanada reviles. Galbraith believes that the doctor is the film's titular 'drunken angel' for seeking the improvement of others over himself despite his self-hatred; the film historian Donald Richie agrees, but believes that Matsunaga and Sanada "are angels to each other." To Richie, Matsunaga's death, doused in white paint, represents a blurring of morality and an apotheosis for the character. Matsunaga is also paired with various women in the film: he and Sanada's nurse Miyo each have a relationship with his old yakuza boss Okada, however, she resists returning to her old life; additionally, one of Sanada's patients is also afflicted with tuberculosis, but is able to overcome her illness. Both Matsunaga and Sanada have women that love and care for them in what Galbraith terms a "Hitchcock-like parallelism". It is these women that historian David Conrad believes best embody the future, despite their marginal role in comparison to Kurosawa's earlier films No Regrets for Our Youth and One Wonderful Sunday.

A publicity still showing Matsunaga (Mifune) and Sanada (Shimura)

The film scholar James Goodwin's perspective on the film's dual identity is informed by his reading of the psychological doubling between Matsunaga and Sanada. He considers Sanada's commitment to healing his patients (thus ending their need for his services), while he himself remains an unhealed alcoholic to be paradoxical. Similarly, when Matsunaga's condition deteriorates, he hallucinates raising his own corpse from a coffin, only to be scorned by it. Both characters are positioned as sharing, "a vital [emotional] bond." Richie identifies Matsunaga's hallucinatory sequence with the relationship he shares with the nurse Miyo to the yakuza Okada. The sequence follows a scene where Miyo had been recognised by the yakuza; she is then identified by an edit that sees Mifune watching a doll floating in the sump. As he hallucinates, the sump transforms into the open sea, a change in location that signifies both characters' desires to escape. The film's final scene between Sanada and the barmaid Gin is thus a misunderstanding, since the conflict within Matsunaga was internal, they are unable to understand that his violent death was an attempt to eradicate the evil of his past self. However, Mitsuhiro Yoshimoto considers Kurosawa's attempt at moral complexity to be a mistake, since despite his alcoholism, Sanada remains the idealistic moral anchor of the film.

Stephen Prince, in his analysis of Kurosawa's filmography, considers the "double loss of identity" present within the film. One loss requires the individual to forge a new sense of self by separating themselves from old institutions, such as the nation and yakuza, which erode personal identity. The other loss is symptomatic of a "national schizophrenia" that has resulted from the Americanisation of Japan, which also represents an affront to the individual. In the film the young are cut off from the past but still bound by its social mores. Scholar James Maxfield examines the relationship formed between yakuza within the film. To him, Sanada's assertion that the code of honour observed by the yakuza is only built on money is proved correct when Matsunaga's confrontation with his syndicate's boss shows the former wearing shoes on tatami with money strewn around him, indicating the two men's mutual disrespect to each other. As Matsunaga continues to lose his status, Maxfield rejects any moral reasoning for Matsunaga's confrontation with Okada, rather positing that he is motivated by pride and selfishness. Through this motivation, Maxfield sees the link in Sanada and Matsunaga's relationship: that because of his identification with Matsunaga's behaviour, Sanada loves him and tries to heal his own past wounds.

=== Open sump imagery ===
Sanada stands over the open sump, variously interpreted as a representation of contemporary Japanese society, illness, and character psychology.

Goodwin, Galbraith, and the film critic Mark Schilling, each view the open sump as a representative of the desolate postwar world. Maxfield sees in the sump specifically the source of evil within postwar society. Both Galbraith and Richie see in the sump an additional psychological dimension, viewing the characters' reflections on the murky water as an indication of their mentality, with Matsunaga throwing his carnation away as a symbol that he has discarded his life. Yoshimoto agrees with this psychological assessment of the sump, arguing that its recurring appearance structures the film and establishes Matsunaga's psychological profile. He links this to Matsunaga's eventual breakdown, which is visually foreshadowed when his image is split across a three-panel mirror during his fight with Okada.

Richie additionally identifies the sump with a metaphysical condition as well as illness directly. Citing the scene where Matsunaga collapses after voluntarily returning to the clinic at night: because the camera movement from the clinic across the sump occurs after Matsunaga has declared his intent to reform himself, the movement implies a more ambiguous future. Prince links this sequence with a prior scene containing a similar series of dissolves that links Miyo to the sump, an image that constrains both her and Matsunaga to a decaying social space. He writes that the narrative and spatial confinement of much of the film close to the sump returns the film's action to sickness, posing the question of how recovery can emerge from a humane ethic under postwar conditions.

=== Intertextuality ===
David Desser points to Drunken Angel as an early example of Kurosawa showing how Western culture impacted Japanese society, arguing that the film adapts modes of thought from American gangster stories and the existentialist literature of Fyodor Dostoevsky. Similarly, Goodwin writes on the intertextual qualities of the film and Kurosawa's references to different artistic mediums. He considers the final fight between Matsunaga and his rival among spilt paint to be a kind of "action painting" and also compares Drunken Angel's literary qualities to the novels of Dostoevsky. In particular, Goodwin focusses on a process of psychological doubling found in Dostoevsky's novels, wherein internal paradoxes and contrasting personalities—such as those of Matsunaga and Sanada—form a dialogue on suffering and human nature. In comparing characterisations, the film theorist Noël Burch compares Sanada and Matsunaga to Prince Mishkin and the characters of The Lower Depths for their "stubborn fantasising" amidst a series of complex social obligations. To Conrad, Kurosawa's focus on illness in a world of yakuza and panpan girls, so employing the genre trappings of film noir, served to criticise American governance via the aesthetics of American culture.

== Release ==
=== Theatrical ===
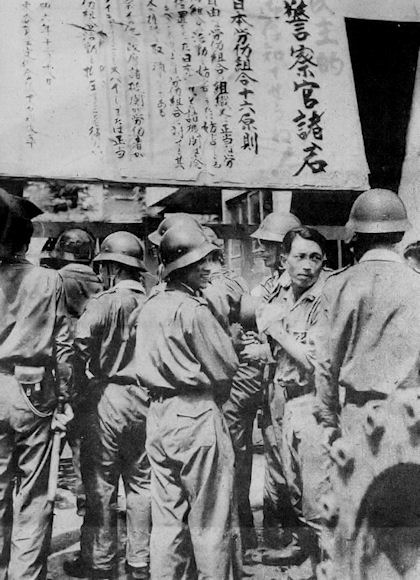
Toho strikes (1948)

Drunken Angel was released in Japanese cinemas on April 27, 1948. Upon the film's completion, Kurosawa went to Akita to observe the memorial services of his father, but was recalled as the Toho union's strikes had escalated. The new company president, Tetsuzo Watanabe, vetoed any further union-supported films and, in April, fired 1,200 employees. In response, the union occupied the building, halting production on new films. The strikers were placed under siege by police and the American military. The studio ended the workers' pay and shut down the filming lot on June 1. In need of money, Kurosawa directed two stage productions, one of Anton Chekhov's A Marriage Proposal, and the other an adaptation of Drunken Angel. Kurosawa soon left the studio, being both disillusioned by executives' attitudes to the union, and by the state of siege the occupying strikers were put under. In his memoir Kurosawa writes that the studio, "I had thought was my home actually belonged to strangers".

The film was one of only four productions that Toho released in 1948, reflecting the studio management's priorities amidst the strike action. Toho promoted the release of the film throughout the 1950s, with it premiering in the United States in January 1960 as part of a nine-film release licensed by Brandon Films. The film was re-released in the United States in 2002 as part of the "Kurosawa & Mifune" film festival where it accrued $561,692 ($1.01 million in 2025) in total.

=== Home media ===
A VHS version of Drunken Angel was released by Home Vision Cinema. The Criterion Collection released a DVD version of the film alongside other Kurosawa films in a 2009 box set.

== Reception ==
=== Critical response ===
==== Contemporary opinion ====
Upon release in Japan, the film received positive reviews. However, there were some critics who did not believe the film went far enough in condemning the activities of its protagonist or the yakuza world at-large. According to Kurosawa, critics referred to him as a journalistic filmmaker because he was interested in contemporary subjects. Japanese audiences were surprised by Mifune's emotional performance, a form of expressiveness that was not generally seen in Japanese cinema of the time. Galbraith compares the impact of, and audiences' positive reaction to, Mifune's performance with Marlon Brando's in A Streetcar Named Desire (1951). Japanese critics have pointed to Drunken Angel as embodying the postwar epoch in Japanese society, with comparisons made to Bicycle Thieves (1948) and Paisan (1946).

In a 1954 article for Sight and Sound, prior to any wide international release, filmmaker Jay Leyda discussed Drunken Angel in the context of growing international interest in Japanese cinema, praising its range, cinematography, and fluid structure. Writing just prior to the American release, Bosley Crowther's 1959 review for The New York Times, cites the film's creation of an unpleasant atmosphere in his positive appraisal of its symbolic moral conflict. He also gives a positive account of the acting and Kurosawa's "forceful imagery", despite criticising some of the film's unoriginal formal methods and clichés. A review in Variety magazine compared Drunken Angel to Italian neorealist cinema in its depiction of contemporary Japanese society; the review also praised the film's acting and pursuit of morality within the postwar devastation. However, a negative review by Dwight Macdonald in Esquire negatively compared the film to the simultaneous American releases of Ikiru (1952) and The Men Who Tread on the Tiger's Tail (1945), criticising the film as an "embarrassingly familiar gangster melodrama."

==== Retrospective opinion ====
On the review aggregator website Rotten Tomatoes, Drunken Angel has a 94% approval rating based on 16 reviews. A review in Slant Magazine gave the film three stars out of four, praising Kurosawa's dynamic cinematism. In a 2007 essay for The Criterion Collection, East Asian scholar Ian Buruma writes on the changes taking place within Japanese society as seen in Drunken Angel. He perceives the lack of Allied soldiers and panpan girls within a narrative where traditional feudal loyalties to the state have been used to justify crime and immoral behaviour as an effective criticism of the pre- and postwar social orders. Writing for New York Press in 2010, film critic Armond White praised the film's handling of the balance between remorse and grief. Although he considers some of its symbolism obvious, he writes appreciatingly of its deployment and favourably compares the film to later social and crime dramas.

=== Accolades ===
Award	Date	Category	Recipient(s)	Result	Ref.
Mainichi Film Awards	1948	Best Film	Drunken Angel	Won	
Mainichi Film Awards	1948	Best Cinematography	Takeo Itō	Won	
Mainichi Film Awards	1948	Best Music	Fumio Hayasaka	Won	
Kinema Junpo	1948	Best Film of the Year	Drunken Angel	Won	

== Legacy ==
Drunken Angel is often considered Kurosawa's first major work. Leyda credits the film as the precursor responsible for the entry of Rashomon (1950) into the 1951 Venice Film Festival, and thus exposing non-Japanese audiences to postwar Japanese cinema. Kurosawa later reflected on the film's structural weakness which he mostly attributed to Mifune's intense screen-presence, one which overshadowed Shimura's role as the moral centre of the film. However, the director saw it as his earliest project that deeply considered the image's relationship to music, and remembered it happily as the first film that was his own, meaning that was free from the interference of the studio, union, and wartime censorship. In a 1960 interview with Donald Richie, Kurosawa attributed the film's popularity upon its release to the fact that it was the only film in cinemas that took an interest in its characters. Kurosawa later referred to Drunken Angel as the first of his films that used dynamic compositions.

In Mark Schilling's study on yakuza films, he cites Drunken Angel as the first to depict postwar yakuza. Schilling notes that the film does not follow many of the formal expectations within the genre, which he attributes to Kurosawa's humanism, examining how the world around the yakuza influences their actions. In a 2002 interview, actor Bunta Sugawara likewise referenced the film as the earliest postwar yakuza movie. Conrad cites Drunken Angel as the first postwar film with a yakuza protagonist.
