= Legacy of the 500,000 =

- Theatrical release poster

Japanese name
- Kanji: 五十万人の遺産
Transcriptions
- Revised Hepburn: Gojuman-nin no Isan
- Directed by: Toshiro Mifune
- Written by: Ryūzō Kikushima
- Produced by: Sanezumi Fujimoto; Tomoyuki Tanaka
- Starring: Toshiro Mifune; Tatsuya Mihashi; Tsutomu Yamazaki; Sachio Sakai; Yoshio Tsuchiya; Yoshifumi Tajima; Tatsuya Nakadai; Mie Hama; Yuriko Hoshi
- Cinematography: Takao Saito
- Edited by: Shūichi Anbara; Akira Kurosawa (uncredited)
- Music by: Masaru Sato
- Production companies: Mifune Productions; Takarazuka Eiga; Toho
- Distributed by: Toho
- Release date: April 1963 (Japan)
- Running time: 98 minutes
- Country: Japan
- Language: Japanese
- Box office: ¥225 million

Legacy of the 500,000 (五十万人の遺産, Gojuman-nin no Isan) is a 1963 Japanese epic action film directed by Toshiro Mifune (in his sole directorial credit) and co-edited by Akira Kurosawa, with special effects by Eiji Tsuburaya. The film stars Mifune, Tatsuya Mihashi, Tsutomu Yamazaki, Sachio Sakai, Yoshio Tsuchiya, Yoshifumi Tajima, Tatsuya Nakadai, Mie Hama and Yuriko Hoshi. It was also Mifune Productions' first feature film.

== Premise ==
A war veteran who battled in the Philippines during World War II is kidnapped by two brothers in search of the gold he buried on an island in the Philippines during the war.

== Cast ==
- Toshiro Mifune as Takeichi Matsuo
- Tatsuya Mihashi as Keigo Gunji
- Tsutomu Yamazaki as Tsukuda
- Sachio Sakai as Igarashi
- Yoshifumi Tajima as Yasumoto
- Tatsuya Nakadai as Mitsuru Gunji
- Yoshio Tsuchiya as Yamazaki
- Mie Hama as Igorot native
- Yuriko Hoshi as Masako Matsuo
- Tetsu Nakamura as an oriental man
- Keiko Yamada as Baker's spouse
- Michiko Hayashi as a female clerk

== Release ==
The film was released April 8 or 28, 1963 in Japan, by Toho. A U.S. screening followed on June 12, 1964.
