= Minshū no Teki =

- 民衆の敵
- Directed by: Tadashi Imai
- Music by: Fumio Hayasaka
- Release date: April 25, 1946
- Running time: 83 minutes
- Country: Japan
- Language: Japanese

Minshū no Teki (民衆の敵, An Enemy of the People) is a 1946 Japanese drama film directed by Tadashi Imai and released on April 25, 1946. It was an attack on the Imperial system and an expression of Imai's allegiance to the Japanese Communist Party.

== Cast ==
- Susumu Fujita
- Akitake Kōno
- Kogiku Hanayagi
- Ureo Egawa
- Takashi Shimura
- Ichiro Sugai

== Reception ==
At the 1st Mainichi Film Award, Tadashi Imai won the Award for Best Director and Fumio Hayasaka won the Award for Best Music.
