= Akitake Kōno =

Japanese actor (1911–1978)

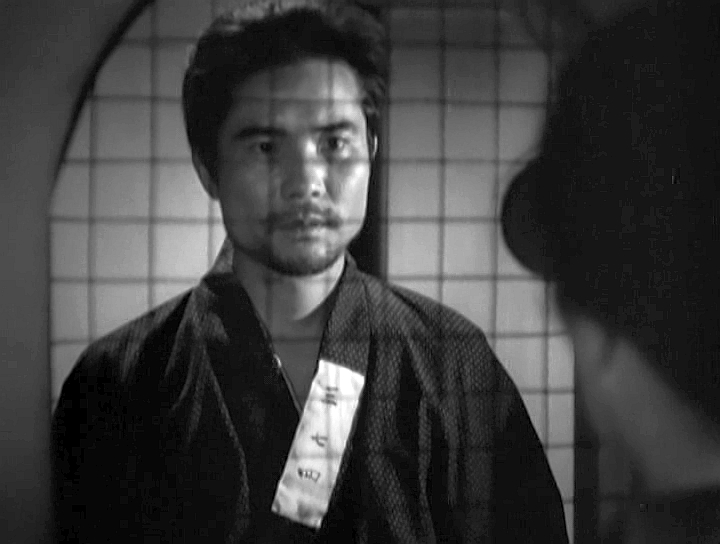
- Born: 8 October 1911; Nagasaki, Japan
- Died: 17 March 1978 (aged 66); Itō, Shizuoka, Japan
- Occupation: Actor
- Years active: 1943-1977

Akitake Kōno (河野 秋武, Kōno Akitake; 8 October 1911 – 17 March 1978) was a Japanese film actor. He appeared in more than sixty films from 1943 to 1973.

== Career ==
Kōno started acting with the Zenshinza theater troupe before joining the Toho studio in 1942. Mostly a character actor, he appeared in films by directors such as Akira Kurosawa and Kenji Mizoguchi as well on television.

== Selected filmography ==
Film
Year	Title	Role	Notes
1943	Sanshiro Sugata		
1945	The Men Who Tread on the Tiger's Tail		
1945	Sanshiro Sugata Part II		
1946	Minshū no Teki		
1946	No Regrets for Our Youth	Itokawa	
1949	Lady from Hell	Tachibana	
1950	Bōryoku no Machi		
1950	Listen to the Voices of the Sea		
1954	Sansho the Bailiff		
1955	Rokunin no Ansatsusha	Nakaoka Shintarō	
1956	Shirogane Shinjū		
1957	Temptress and the Monk		
1957	Sun in the Last Days of the Shogunate		
1959	The Human Condition I: No Greater Love		
1964	Adventures of Zatoichi		
