= Noriko Sengoku =

Japanese actress (1922–2012)

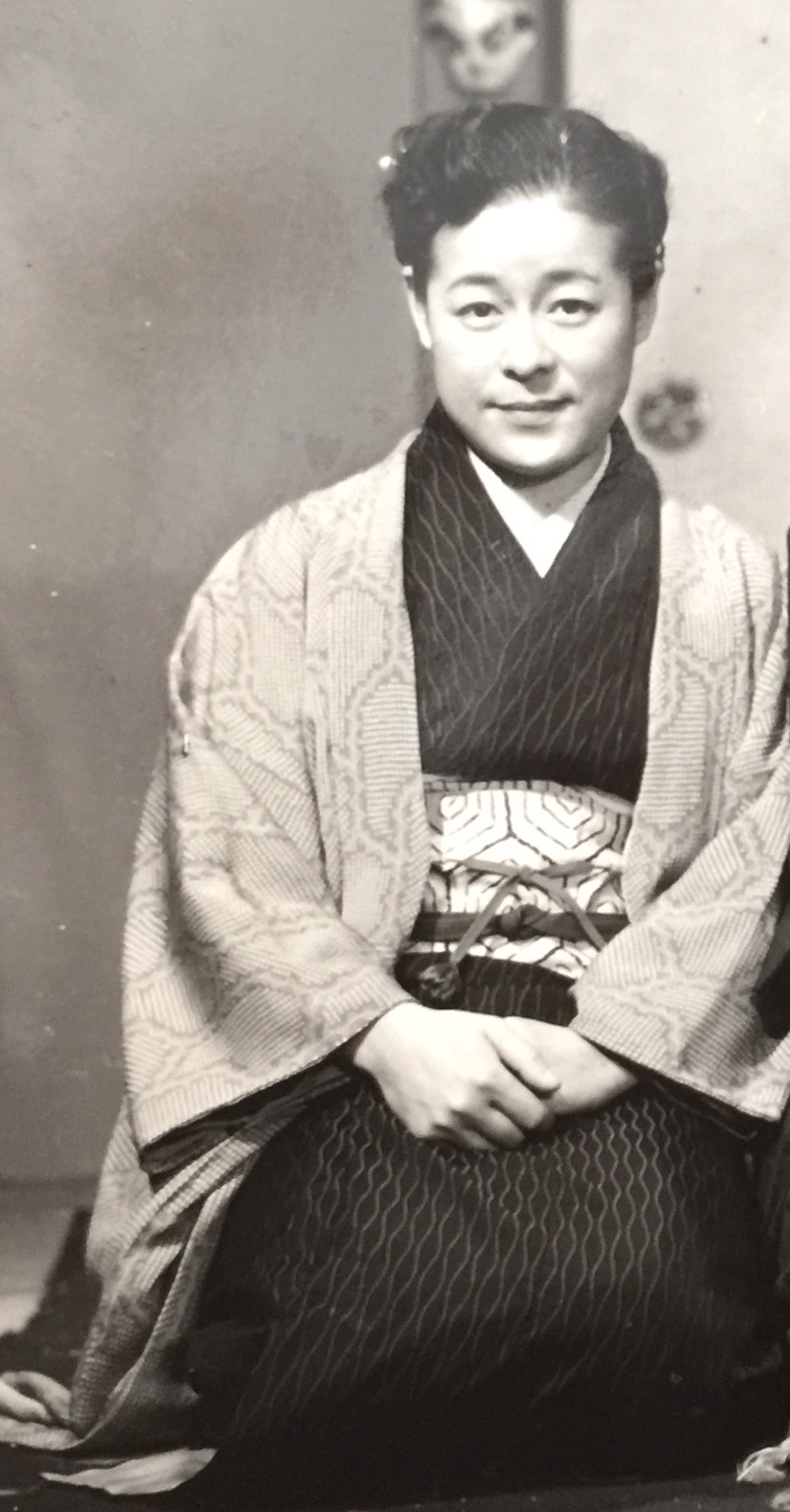
- Noriko Sengoku in 1956.
- Born: Reiko Mori; April 29, 1922; Tokyo, Japan
- Died: December 27, 2012 (aged 90)
- Years active: 1947–2012

Noriko Sengoku (千石規子, Sengoku Noriko), born Reiko Mori (森 礼子, Mori Reiko; April 29, 1922 – December 27, 2012) was a Japanese film and television actress active primarily in the 1950s and 1960s. She made her film debut in 1947 and starred in several of Akira Kurosawa's early films such as Drunken Angel (1948), The Quiet Duel (1949), Stray Dog (1949), Scandal (1950), The Idiot (1951) and Seven Samurai (1954).
