= Jakoman and Tetsu =

Jakoman and Tetsu is a screenplay by Akira Kurosawa and Senkichi Taniguchi that was based on the novel Nishin gyogyo (Herring Fishery) by Keizo Kajino. It has been adapted into film twice.

== 1949 Toho adaptation ==
Jakoman and Tetsu (1949) is a Toho Studios adaptation directed by co-screenwriter Senkichi Taniguchi starring Toshiro Mifune. This adaptation was followed by a sequel, Tetsu of Jilba (ジルバの鉄) (1950), co-written by Akira Kurosawa and Goro Tanada and directed by Isamu Kosugi, with Toshiro Mifune taking over the role of Tetsu.

== 1964 Toei adaptation ==
Jakoman and Tetsu (1964) is a Toei Studios adaptation based on the earlier screenplay directed by Kinji Fukasaku and starring Ken Takakura and Tetsuro Tamba.
