= The Quiet Duel =

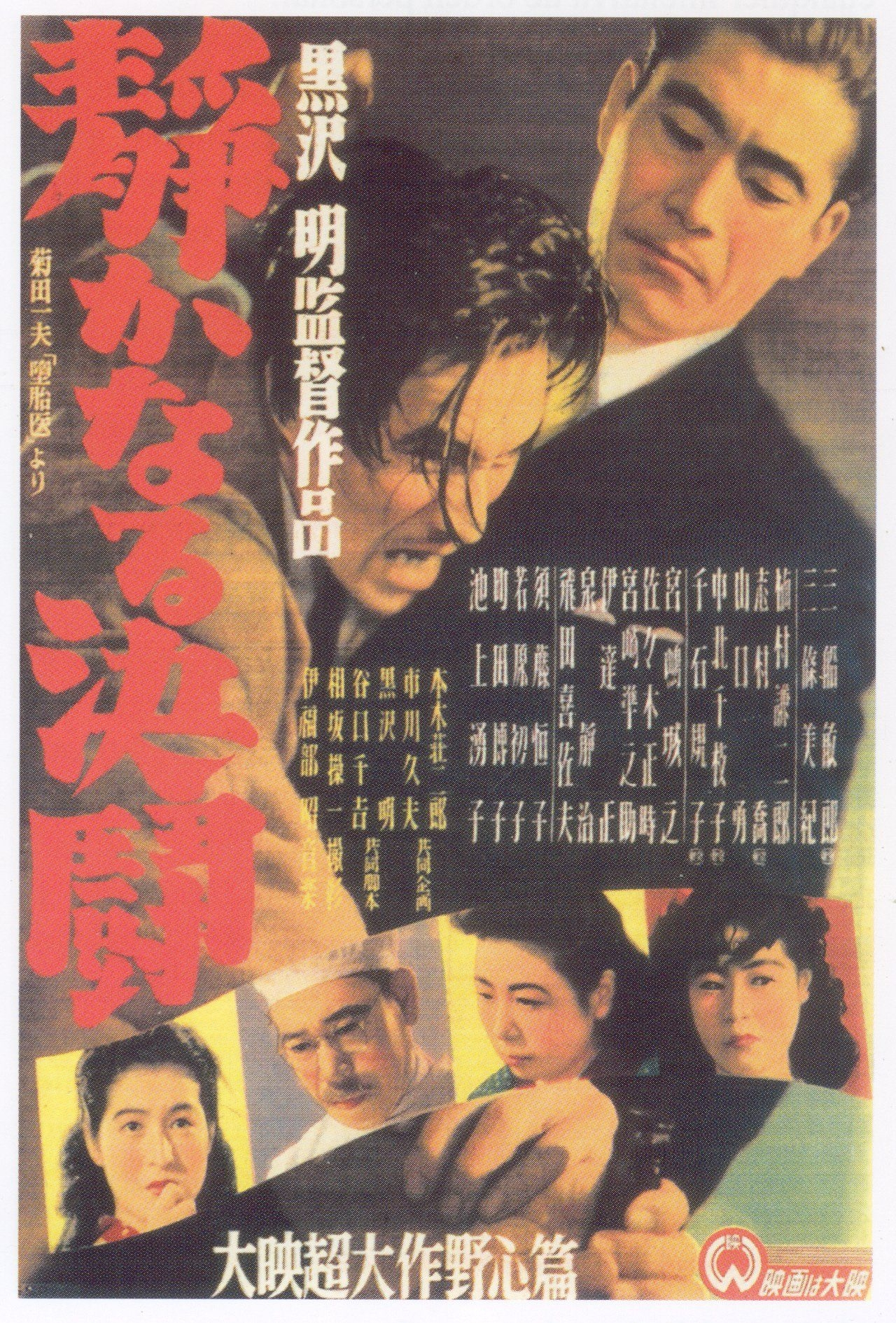
- Directed by: Akira Kurosawa
- Screenplay by: Senkichi Taniguchi; Akira Kurosawa
- Based on: The Abortion Doctor by Kazuo Kikuta
- Produced by: Sōjirō Motoki; Hisao Ichikawa
- Starring: Toshiro Mifune; Takashi Shimura
- Cinematography: Soichi Aisaka
- Edited by: Masanori Tsujii
- Music by: Akira Ifukube
- Production companies: Film Art Association; Daiei Film
- Distributed by: Daiei Film
- Release date: March 13, 1949 (Japan)
- Running time: 95 minutes
- Country: Japan
- Language: Japanese

The Quiet Duel (静かなる決闘, Shizukanaru Kettō) is a 1949 Japanese medical drama film directed by Akira Kurosawa from a screenplay he co-wrote with Senkichi Taniguchi.

== Plot ==
The film centers on Dr. Kyoji Fujisaki, a young, idealistic doctor who, during his service as an army physician during World War II, contracted syphilis from the blood of a patient when he accidentally cut himself during an operation.

Contaminated with this infectious, typically shameful, and then-virtually incurable disease, Fujisaki returns home from the war to the clinic presided over by his obstetrician father, Dr. Konosuke Fujisaki. He comes into contact with the patient who contaminated him, in the process seeing the consequences of ignoring the disease. Treating himself in secret with Salvarsan and tormented by his sense of injustice for not being able to help the man, he rejects Misao, his fiancé of six years, without explanation, as he does not wish her to have to wait for a number of years until he is cured. Heartbroken, Misao becomes engaged to another man. She makes one last plea to Fujisaki, but he stands firm in rejecting her.

== Cast ==
- Toshiro Mifune as Dr. Kyoji Fujisaki
- Miki Sanjo as Misao Matsumoto
- Takashi Shimura as Dr. Konosuke Fujisaki
- Kenjiro Uemura as Susumu Nakada
- Isamu Yamaguchi as Patrolman Nosaka
- Noriko Sengoku as apprentice nurse Rui Minegishi
- Chieko Nakakita as Takiko Nakada
- Kenichi Miyajima as the dealer
- Masateru Sasaki as the old soldier
- Seiji Izumi as the policeman
- Tadashi Date as the father of the boy with appendicitis
- Shigeyuki Miyajima as the officer

== Production ==
Production was interrupted due to a lengthy strike at the Toho movie studio, and Kurosawa would ultimately finish the movie at rival studio Daiei. At that time Daiei also owned a baseball team, the Daiei Stars, whose players visited the movie set during filming.

== Reception ==
According to review aggregator Rotten Tomatoes, the film received three critic reviews rated 'Fresh', but did not receive enough reviews to earn a consensus.

== Home video ==
The Quiet Duel was released on DVD in the U.S. by BCI Eclipse, as the first title in their "Director's Series". It was never released in U.K. cinemas, but was released on DVD in the U.K. in 2006 under the title "The Silent Duel".
