= Sōjirō Motoki =

Japanese film producer and film director (1914–1977)

- Born: 19 June 1914; Shinbashi, Tokyo, Japan
- Died: 21 May 1977 (aged 62); Shinjuku, Tokyo, Japan
- Occupations: Film producer, screenwriter, film director
- Years active: 1938–1977

Sōjirō Motoki (本木 荘二郎, Motoki Sōjirō) was a Japanese filmmaker who served primarily as a film producer, but also as a writer and director. He was most famous for producing several films for Akira Kurosawa, including Seven Samurai, Ikiru and Throne of Blood. He also produced films for other directors, including Mikio Naruse, for whom he produced Spring Awakens and Battle of Roses, and Kazuo Mori, for whom he produced Vendetta for a Samurai. As a writer, he provided the story for Kei Kumai's 1968 film The Sands of Kurobe, starring Kurosawa favorite Toshiro Mifune.

Besides the films he is credited with producing, Motoki also had an influence on other Kurosawa films. For example, he was involved in the production of Rashomon. Motoki sent the letter to screenwriter Shinobu Hashimoto inviting him to help expand the script of Rashomon.

During the late 1940s, Motoki joined with directors Kurosawa, Senkichi Taniguchi and Kajiro Yamamoto (eventually joined by Naruse as well) to form a short-lived independent production company, the Motion Picture Art Association, which was responsible for such films as Rashomon, The Quiet Duel and Stray Dog.
