= Snow Trail =

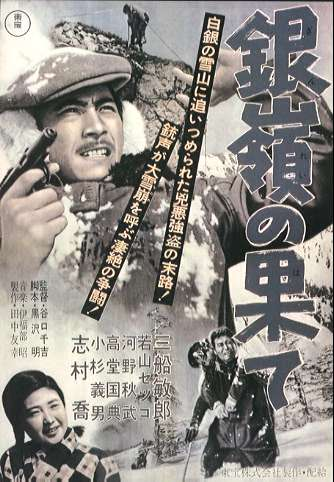
- Theatrical release poster
- Directed by: Senkichi Taniguchi
- Written by: Akira Kurosawa; Senkichi Taniguchi (uncredited)
- Produced by: Tomoyuki Tanaka
- Cinematography: Junichi Segawa
- Edited by: Senkichi Taniguchi; Akira Kurosawa (uncredited)
- Music by: Akira Ifukube
- Production company: Toho
- Distributed by: Toho
- Release date: August 5, 1947 (Japan)
- Running time: 89 minutes
- Country: Japan
- Language: Japanese

Snow Trail (Japanese: 銀嶺の果て, Hepburn: Ginrei no Hate) is a 1947 black-and-white Japanese film directed by Senkichi Taniguchi from a screenplay by Akira Kurosawa. It was the first film role for Toshirō Mifune, later to become one of Japan's most famous actors. Mifune and the other main actor in the film, Takashi Shimura, later became long-term collaborators of Kurosawa.

== Plot ==
Three bank robbers (Mifune, Takashi Shimura, and Yoshio Kosugi) on the run from the police hide out high up in the snowy Japanese mountains in a remote lodge inhabited by an old man, his granddaughter and an intrepid mountaineer (Akitake Kono) trapped there by a recent blizzard. They don't know that the men are criminals, and a tense standoff starts to unfold.

== Cast ==
- Toshiro Mifune as Eijima
- Takashi Shimura as Nojiro
- Yoshio Kosugi as Takasugi
- Akitake Kono as Honda
- Setsuko Wakayama as Haruko
- Kokuten Kōdō as Haruko's Grandfather
