= Senkichi Taniguchi =

Japanese film director and screenwriter

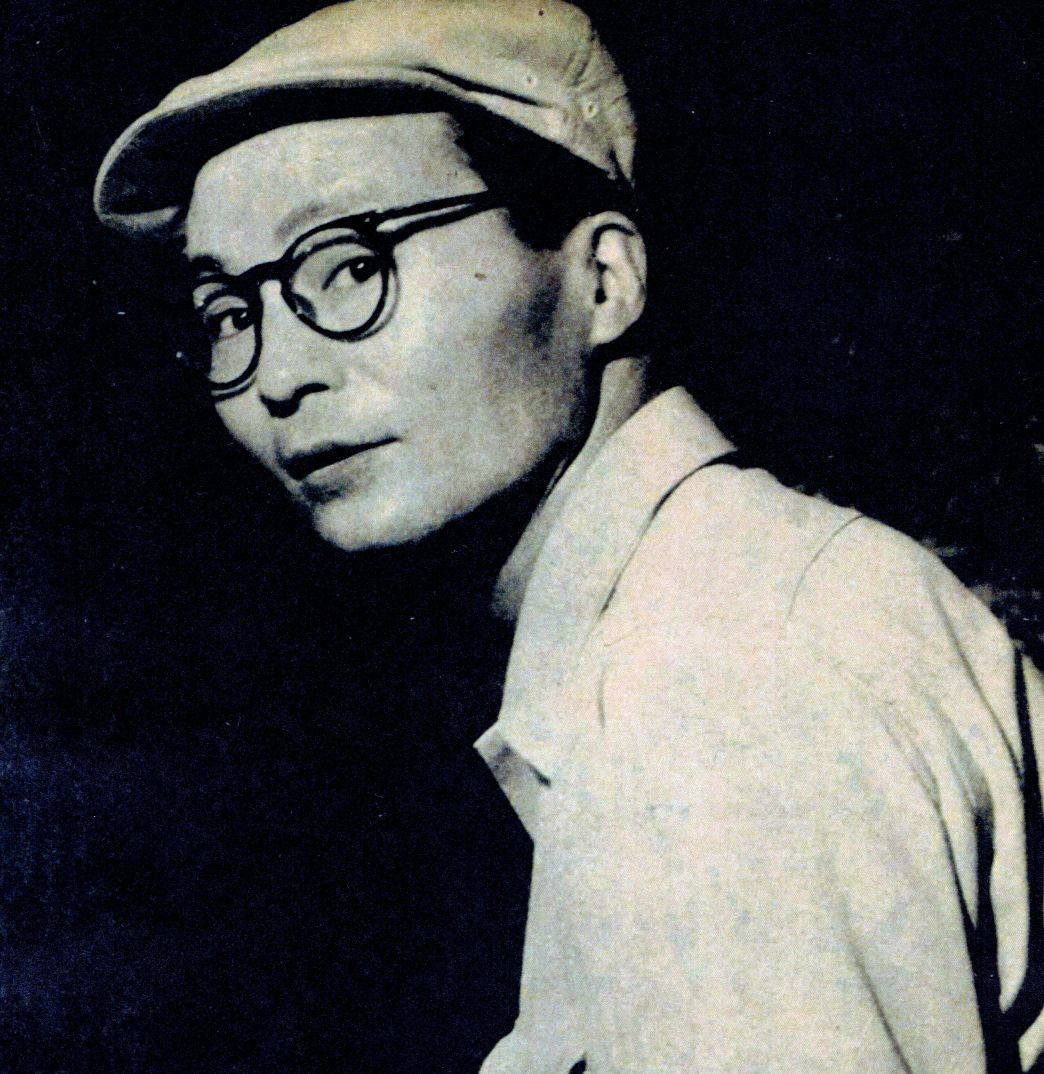
- Taniguchi in 1954
- Born: February 19, 1912; Tokyo, Japan
- Died: October 29, 2007 (aged 95); Tokyo, Japan
- Occupations: Film director, screenwriter

Senkichi Taniguchi (谷口 千吉, Taniguchi Senkichi) (February 19, 1912 – October 29, 2007) was a Japanese film director and screenwriter.

== Life and career ==
Born in Tokyo, Japan, he attended Waseda University but left before graduating due to his involvement in a left-wing theater troupe. He joined P.C.L. (a precursor to Toho) in 1933 and began working as an assistant director to Kajirō Yamamoto alongside his longtime friend, acclaimed Japanese filmmaker, Akira Kurosawa. He made his feature film directing debut in 1947 with Snow Trail, which was written by Kurosawa. Snow Trail starred Toshirō Mifune in his film debut and actress Setsuko Wakayama. It helped establish Taniguchi's reputation for action film.

Taniguchi and Wakayama married in 1949 (he had earlier been married to screenwriter Yōko Mizuki), and divorced in 1956. He married his third wife, actress Kaoru Yachigusa, in 1957; they remained married until his death in 2007.

Taniguchi was the screenwriter for the 1949 film, The Quiet Duel, which Kurosawa directed and which also starred Mifune. His most acclaimed film as a director was Escape at Dawn, a controversial anti-war work from 1950 about a Japanese soldier and a "comfort woman" that got into trouble with Occupation era censors. Taniguchi continued to direct movies throughout the 1950s and 1960s, but the quality of his work declined. His films from the time period include Man Against Man, The Gambling Samurai, A Man in the Storm and The Lost World of Sinbad. His 1965 film International Secret Police: Key of Keys was famously re-dubbed and re-released as What's Up, Tiger Lily? by Woody Allen. He was chosen as the supervising director of the official documentary of Expo '70.

Senkichi Taniguchi died of pneumonia at a hospital in Tokyo, Japan, on October 29, 2007, at the age of 95.

== Filmography ==
=== Director ===
- Snow Trail (銀嶺の果て, Ginrei no hate) (1947)
- Jakoman and Tetsu (ジャコ万と鉄, Jakoman to Tetsu) (1949), from a script by Akira Kurosawa
- Escape at Dawn (暁の脱走, Akatsuki no dassō) (1950)
- Beyond Love and Hate (愛と憎しみの彼方へ, Ai to nikushimi no kanata he) (1951)
- Foghorn (霧笛, Muteki) (1952)
- Rangiku monogatari (乱菊物語) (1956)
- Samurai Pirate (大盗賊, Daitōzoku) (1963)
- International Secret Police: Key of Keys (国際秘密警察 鍵の鍵, Kokusai himitsu keisatsu: Kagi no kagi) (1965)

=== Screenplay only ===
- The Quiet Duel (静かなる決闘, Shizukanaru kettō) (1949)
