= One Wonderful Sunday =

1947 Japanese film by Akira Kurosawa

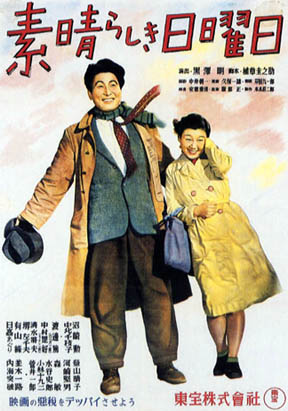
- Theatrical release poster
- Directed by: Akira Kurosawa
- Written by: Akira Kurosawa; Keinosuke Uekusa
- Produced by: Sojiro Motoki
- Starring: Isao Numazaki; Chieko Nakakita
- Cinematography: Asakazu Nakai
- Edited by: Yoshitama Imaizumi
- Music by: Tadashi Hattori
- Production company: Toho Studios
- Distributed by: Toho
- Release date: 1 July 1947
- Running time: 108 minutes
- Country: Japan
- Language: Japanese

One Wonderful Sunday (Japanese: 素晴らしき日曜日, Hepburn: Subarashiki Nichiyōbi) is a 1947 Japanese film directed by Akira Kurosawa and co-written by Kurosawa and Keinosuke Uekusa. The film was produced by Sojiro Motoki for Toho and stars Chieko Nakakita and Isao Numazaki. It was made during the allied occupation of Japan and depicts a young couple who, with only 35 yen between them, go on a date together on the only day of the week they can see each other. The film makes use of sequences depicting characters' imagination and a creative use of sound.

Conceived in the aftermath of a split within Toho resulting from a series of strikes, the film featured unknown actors and was shot on location in the destroyed city of Tokyo. The film, which depicts the challenges of life in early postwar Japan, was released in Japan on 1 July 1947. One Wonderful Sunday received mixed reception, but marked the first award Kurosawa received for his talent as a director. The film has been described as a shomin-geki, a style of realist cinema that focussed on the ordinary lives of the middle class. Reviews focussed on a fourth wall-breaking scene at the climax centred on Franz Schubert's Unfinished Symphony. The film has since been regarded as a point in Kurosawa's directorial career that established many themes in his work.

== Plot ==
Masako and her fiancé, Yuzo, meet in Tokyo on a Sunday for their weekly date. They are determined to remain happy, despite only having thirty-five yen between them. Seeing it as a free activity, Masako persuades Yuzo to go to an open house, Yuzo is depressed at the price since it is far beyond their means. He becomes tetchy when Masako tries to cheer him up, dismissing her dream-like positive attitude, but reconciles with her and the two agree they want to move in together. They hear about an apartment they hope to rent, but find that the quality is poor and that it is too expensive. Yuzo plays baseball with a group of children but accidentally damages a manjū shop, paying ten yen as recompense. Finding a business card for a cabaret owned by someone Yuzo knew in the army, they visit but Yuzo finds himself barred because the manager considers him to be too impoverished to enter. The experience leaves Yuzo questioning whether he should instead turn to illegal means to survive.

After separate encounters with an orphan and children with affluent parents, they reflect on their own maturity and the divided state of the country. They pay two yen to go to the zoo where they satirically refer to the animals' human qualities, but they leave when it starts to rain and they have no umbrella. They try to see a performance of Schubert's Unfinished Symphony only to find that ticket scalpers have already bought up all the cheap tickets to sell at a markup. When Yuzo confronts the scalpers, they beat him up. Yuzo and Masako go back to the apartment Yuzo shares with his friend, who is temporarily away. Masako attempts to comfort a depressed Yuzo's bruised self-confidence, but leaves after Yuzo aggressively tries to pressure her into sex; forgetting her purse, they reconcile when she comes back for it.

The rain stops, and they go to a café, where they are charged for two café au lait, which are twice as expensive as the coffee they thought they had ordered. Spending the last of their money, they are still unable to fully meet the bill, so Yuzo gives his coat to the restaurant as collateral, promising to pay back the rest of the bill the following day. The couple's spirits begin to lift as they talk about their dream of opening a "café for the masses" with good food and drinks at reasonable prices; the two of them act out running their shop in an empty lot they pass by. Yuzo then takes Masako to an empty park where they sing traditional songs while playing on swings. Yuzo spots an outdoor amphitheatre within the park, where he pretends to conduct a performance of the Unfinished Symphony they were not able to see earlier that day. Initially the performance falls flat and the music fails to appear, but after Masako entreats the audience to applaud, Yuzo tries again and successfully conducts the unseen orchestra. The two embrace and return to the train station where they part ways, promising to meet again the following Sunday.

== Cast ==
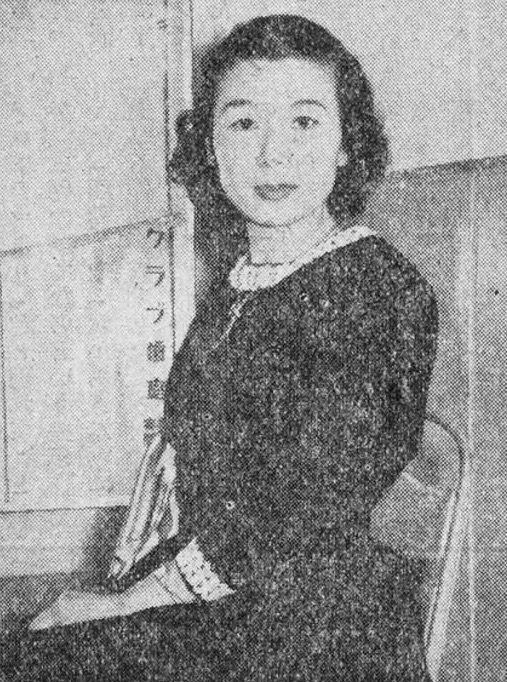
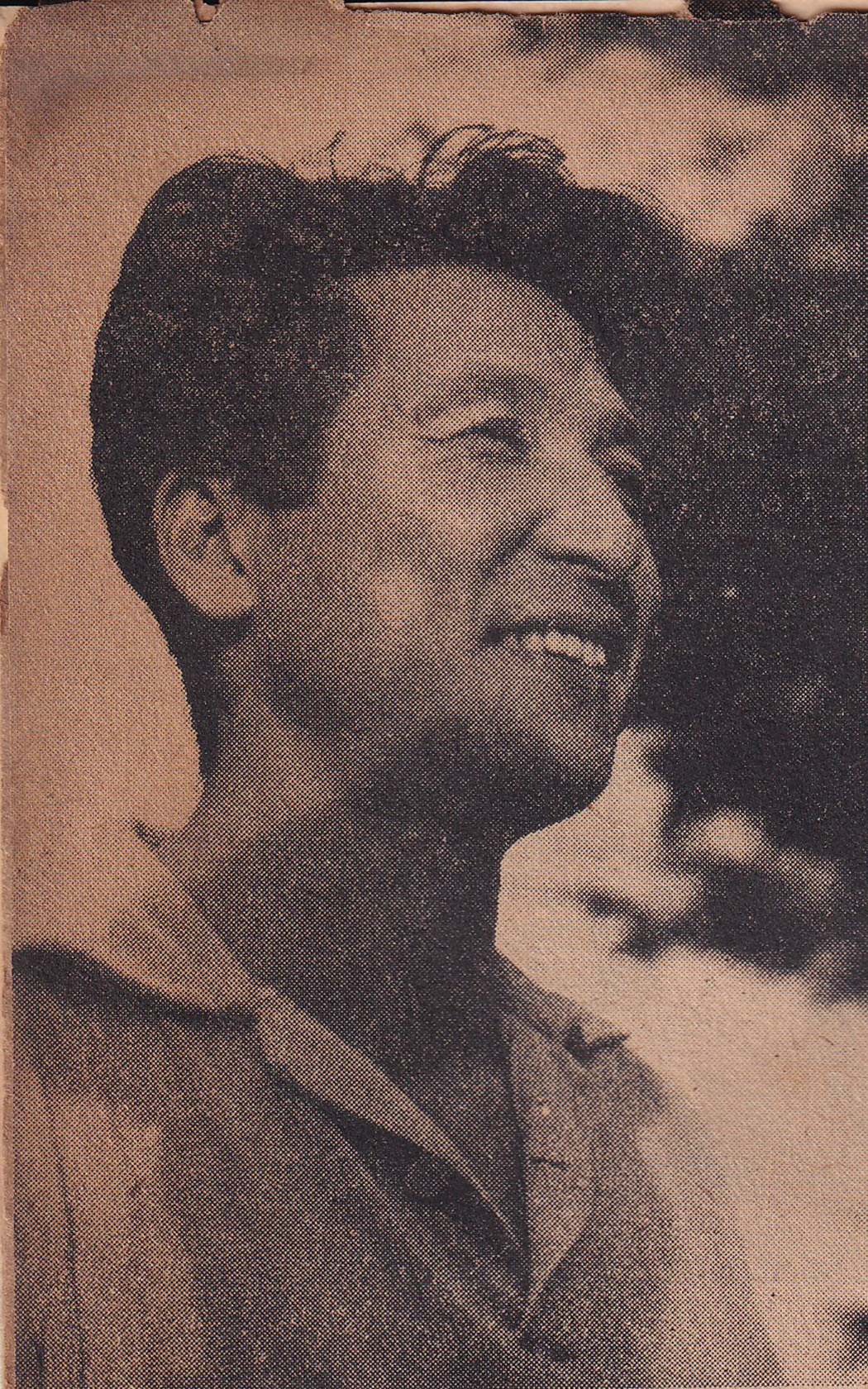
Chieko Nakakita and Isao Numazaki pictured in 1953.
- Chieko Nakakita as Masako
- Isao Numazaki as Yuzo
- Atsushi Watanabe as Yamamoto
- Zekou Nakamura as the dessert shop owner
- Ichiro Sugai as Yamiya, the black-marketeer
- Masao Shimizu as the dance hall manager
- Midori Ariyama as Sono, Yamiya's mistress
- Sachio Sakai as the ticket seller

== Production ==
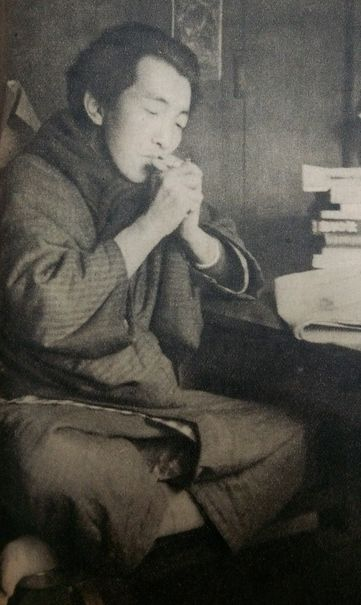
Co-screenwriter of the film Keinosuke Uekusa pictured in 1948.

One Wonderful Sunday was produced by Toho in 1947. The film was conceived in the aftermath of a series of labour strikes that led the stars of Akira Kurosawa's previous film, No Regrets for Our Youth (1946), to defect from the studio and form Shintoho. This breakaway led to a lack of familiar actors contracted to Toho, with the studio relying on its directors, while Shintoho distinguished itself by focussing on their stars. As a result of this new challenge to the film studio, Kurosawa was commissioned to write a segment of the anthology film Four Love Stories (1947) and co-write Snow Trail (1947) concurrently with writing One Wonderful Sunday. The film was written by Kurosawa and his childhood friend Keinosuke Uekusa. (Note: Only Uekusa is credited for his contributions to the screenplay; per Shinobu Hashimoto: " [...] Kurosawa forwent credit.") It was the first film they wrote together in their short professional partnership, and while they collaborated well, they had a difference of opinion about handling the film's climax. While Kurosawa intended to elicit audience participation through applause, Uekusa suggested that applause be included in the film's sound, with the empty amphitheatre revealing couples similar to the film's protagonists. Inspiration for its melodrama came from D.W. Griffith's film Isn't Life Wonderful (1924) and the films of Frank Capra. Kurosawa later reflected that, in the vein of the Italian neorealist movement at the time, he wanted to make a film similar to Bicycle Thieves (1948).

The film was shot on location in Tokyo. Actors Isao Numazaki and Chieko Nakakita were unknown at the time, allowing the crew to film around the city using a handheld camera hidden inside a box and carrying-cloth. The use of this camera caused several problems when bystanders, unaware that a film was being shot, ended up obscuring planned shots, including one man at Shinjuku Station who assumed Kurosawa was a pickpocket when he tried to nudge him out of the camera's view. The actors (deliberately dressed as civilians) were indistinct from the crowds of Tokyo, such that both Kurosawa and the camera operators often lost track of them. Numazaki's lack of musical awareness became an issue when Kurosawa and composer Tadashi Hattori had to spend days teaching him how to conduct the symphony at the film's climax. Filmed in black-and-white and edited by Kurosawa, the lack of good lighting and high-quality camera lenses led to many scenes using a sharp focus that could only emphasise one actor at a time. According to film historian and acquaintance of Kurosawa Donald Richie, this is also the first film where Kurosawa gave particular attention to shot composition and the use of lateral motion. One Wonderful Sunday was shot at the same time as Snow Trail, during the production of which Kurosawa was sent rushes by director Senkichi Taniguchi for comment.

== Themes ==
=== Neorealism in occupied Japan ===
Seen as a variation on the shomin-geki genre, One Wonderful Sunday depicts the everyday life of a young lower-middle class couple in a city haunted by the aftermath of the Second World War. In his study of Kurosawa's filmography, Stephen Prince writes that the film portrays spiritual and social attempts at recovery after the Second World War, he considers Kurosawa's films of this period to form a union of ethics and aesthetics in pursuit of this sense of recovery. Historian David A. Conrad writes that One Wonderful Sunday is one of many occupation-era Japanese films that parallel the more famous Italian neorealism movement; emphasising poverty, hunger, weakening social mores, and urban dilapidation during those years. He continues, writing that it reflects a counter-point to his earlier film No Regrets for Our Youth as being a more cynical take on the occupation and national recovery.

Film scholar James Goodwin states that it was the first in a series of journalistic films intended to examine the realities of Japan's social life. He analyses the film intertextually as an example of Kurosawa employing themes of paradox from the novels of Fyodor Dostoevsky, that is, the transgression of distinct categories like spirituality and materialism, or life and death. He cites the scene of Yuzo being rejected from the cabaret as an example of paradoxical contact between social classes. Here the paradoxical situation of the working-class Yuzo's presence in a high-end club confronts the orthodoxy of contemporary Japanese society as Yuzo struggles to maintain his respectability. Rachael Hutchinson also references the film's emphasis on post-War life, labelling it as a "counter-discursive" take on the Occupation's policies by showing poverty, desolation, and English signage in violation of the CIE censorship regulations.

=== Sound and the affirmation of life ===
I. Allegro moderato
The portion of the Unfinished Symphony heard at the film's climax. Performed by Fulda Symphonic Orchestra, recording in 2000.

According to Prince, the couple is rescued from their despair by the presence of Schubert's Unfinished Symphony in the soundtrack, affirming imaginative power as a means to dispel a harsh reality. He later compares this use of sound as an affirmation of life with the hallucinations of Kurosawa's young protagonist in his later film Dodes'ka-den (1970) who, imagining himself driving a tram, sees this hallucination realised by the film's soundtrack. Noting that suffering in contemporary Japan was widespread, Conrad states that Yuzo and Masako are "unrealistically upright in their adherence to moral ideals". Film scholar Mitsuhiro Yoshimoto also commented on thematic similarities shared by Dodes'ka-den, The Lower Depths (1957), and Dreams (1990), including a focus on imagination and hope for the future.

Goodwin describes the use of the Unfinished Symphony as structuring the film, believing the contradiction between the music's symphonic power and the poor conditions that Schubert composed it under as reflective of the characterisation of the film's protagonists. Donald Richie, in his analysis of the film, draws particular attention to the use of music. However, he comments that the film most creatively employs sound by incorporating it into mundane activities, e.g. the sound of water hitting a metal pan at unexpected intervals, and the tuning note of an oboe evoking the train's whistle at the end. Yoshimoto, however, considers Kurosawa's use of music in the film to be ill-suited to the image. Considering the same scene of water hitting a metal pan, he describes the effect for the viewer as merely irritating and overpowering, an artificial intrusion of the effects. He comments that the use of the Unfinished Symphony in the film's climatic scene is "the most problematic use of sound" which attempts to destroy the diegetic fantasy by encouraging the audience to applaud.

== Release ==
=== Theatrical ===
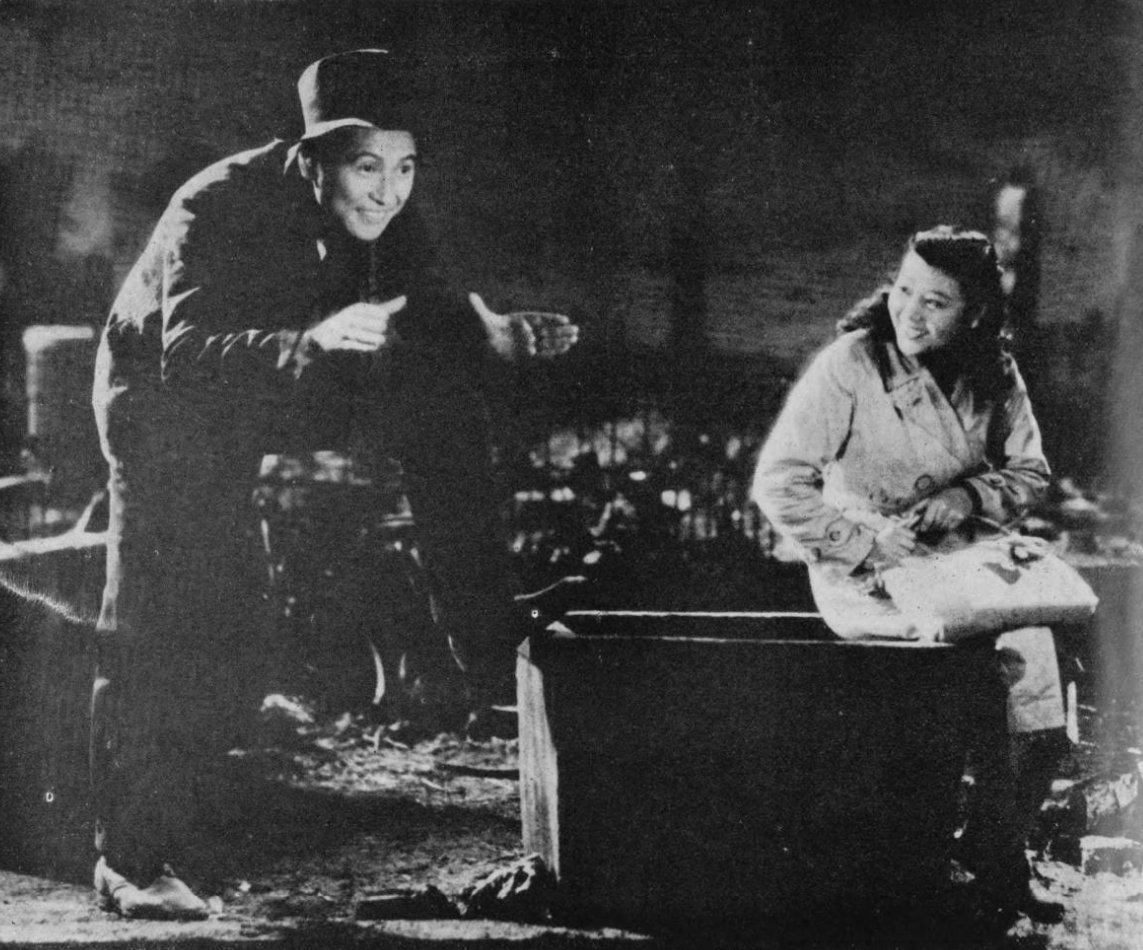
A promotional image showing Yuzo and Masako imagining their café.

The film was released in Japan on 1 July 1947. (Note: Stuart Galbraith IV writes the release date as 25 June 1947 in one source.) As the first major role of her career, One Wonderful Sunday briefly made Chieko Nakakita a star in Toho, while it was the only Kurosawa film that her co-star Numazaki acted in. After the film's release in Japan, Kurosawa received a postcard from his old teacher congratulating him and Uekusa on their achievement; Kurosawa and Uekusa invited him for dinner. During the film's climatic fourth wall-breaking scene, where Masako appeals to the audience to applaud, Kurosawa said he wanted to induce audience participation. Although Japanese audiences sat motionless during the scene where Kurosawa intended engagement, the director later happily remarked that audiences in Paris applauded with enthusiasm. The film made its US theatrical debut on 29 June 1982 but was cut to 95 minutes; the film was re-released in 1987.

=== Home video ===
The Criterion Collection has released One Wonderful Sunday on DVD in North America as part of two Kurosawa-centered box sets; 2008's Postwar Kurosawa, the seventh entry in their Eclipse series, and 2009's AK 100: 25 Films by Akira Kurosawa.

== Reception ==
On the review aggregator website Rotten Tomatoes, One Wonderful Sunday has an approval rating of 88% based on eight critic reviews; those with a score formed an average of 6.8 out of 10. Upon release, One Wonderful Sunday received a mixed reception. It was ranked sixth in Kinema Junpo's "Best Ten" list in 1947. A review in the magazine by Shinbi Iida in July considered the characterisation shallow but praised the film's sense of realism and Kurosawa's technique, referring to his work as, "among the best in contemporary Japanese cinema." The film received awards for its screenplay and direction at the second annual Mainichi Film Awards, marking the first award Kurosawa received for his role as a film director. Reviews tended to focus on the film's orchestral climax, without paying much attention to the preceding events. The film was accused by Kurosawa's contemporary, director Kunio Watanabe, of being Communist propaganda.

Upon the American release of the film in 1982, film critic Vincent Canby contrasted its apparent simplicity with the stylishness of its composition and called it "an essential work" in Kurosawa's oeuvre. Writing in 1986, Rita Kempley of The Washington Post called One Wonderful Sunday "stylistically excessive, [and] wildly experimental", but wrote that it presages the genius of Kurosawa's later works, that in retrospect, the film demonstrates many hallmarks that would come to define Kurosawa's directorial style. Film scholar Peter Wild describes One Wonderful Sunday as the "first glimpse of Kurosawa's humanism" and characterised it as the last juvenile film that he produced.
