= Secondary education in Japan =

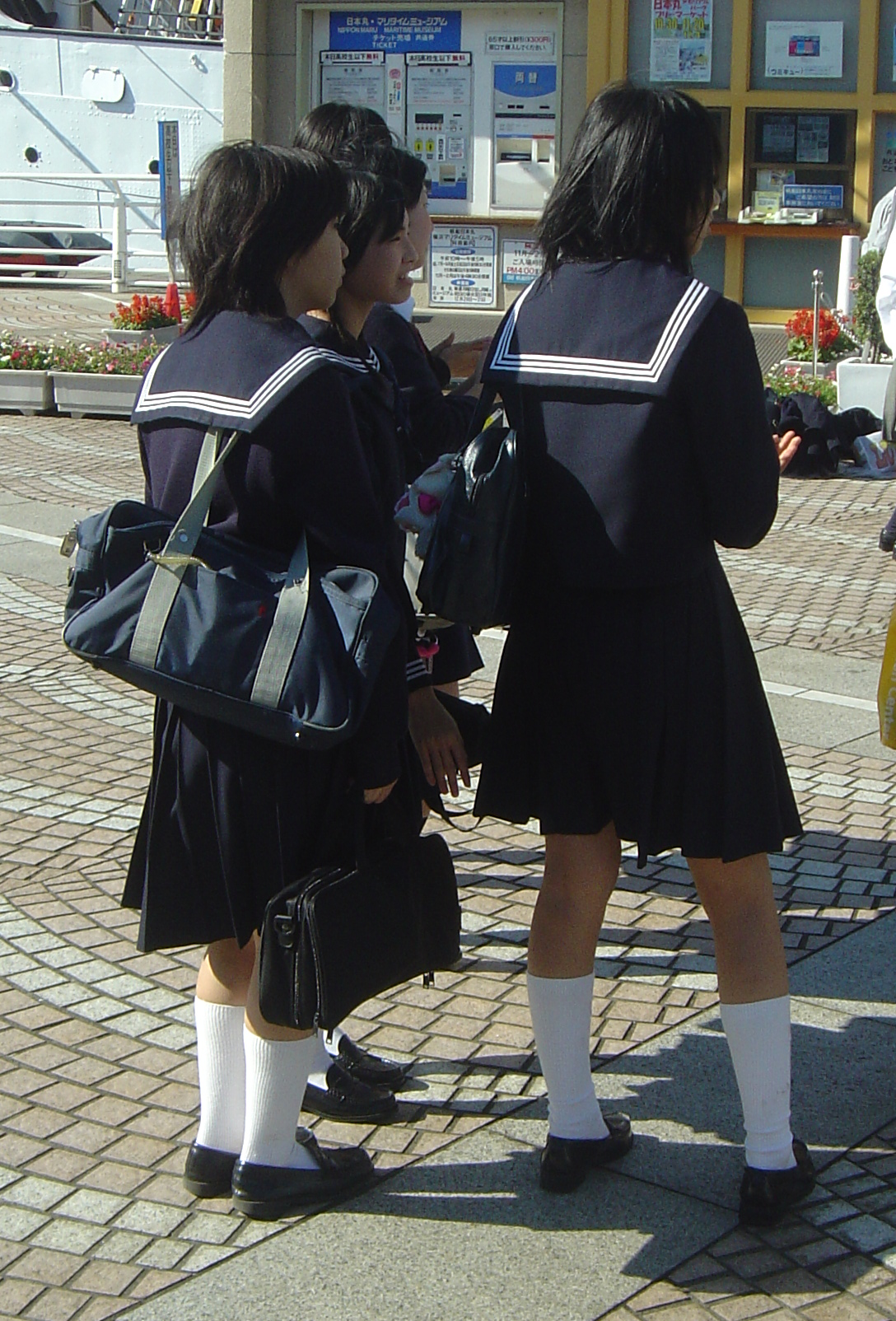
Japanese high school students wearing the sailor fuku

Secondary education in Japan is split into junior high schools (中学校, chūgakkō), which cover the seventh through ninth grade, and senior high schools (高等学校, kōtōgakkō), abbreviated to 高校 (kōkō), which mostly cover grades ten through twelve.

== Junior high school ==
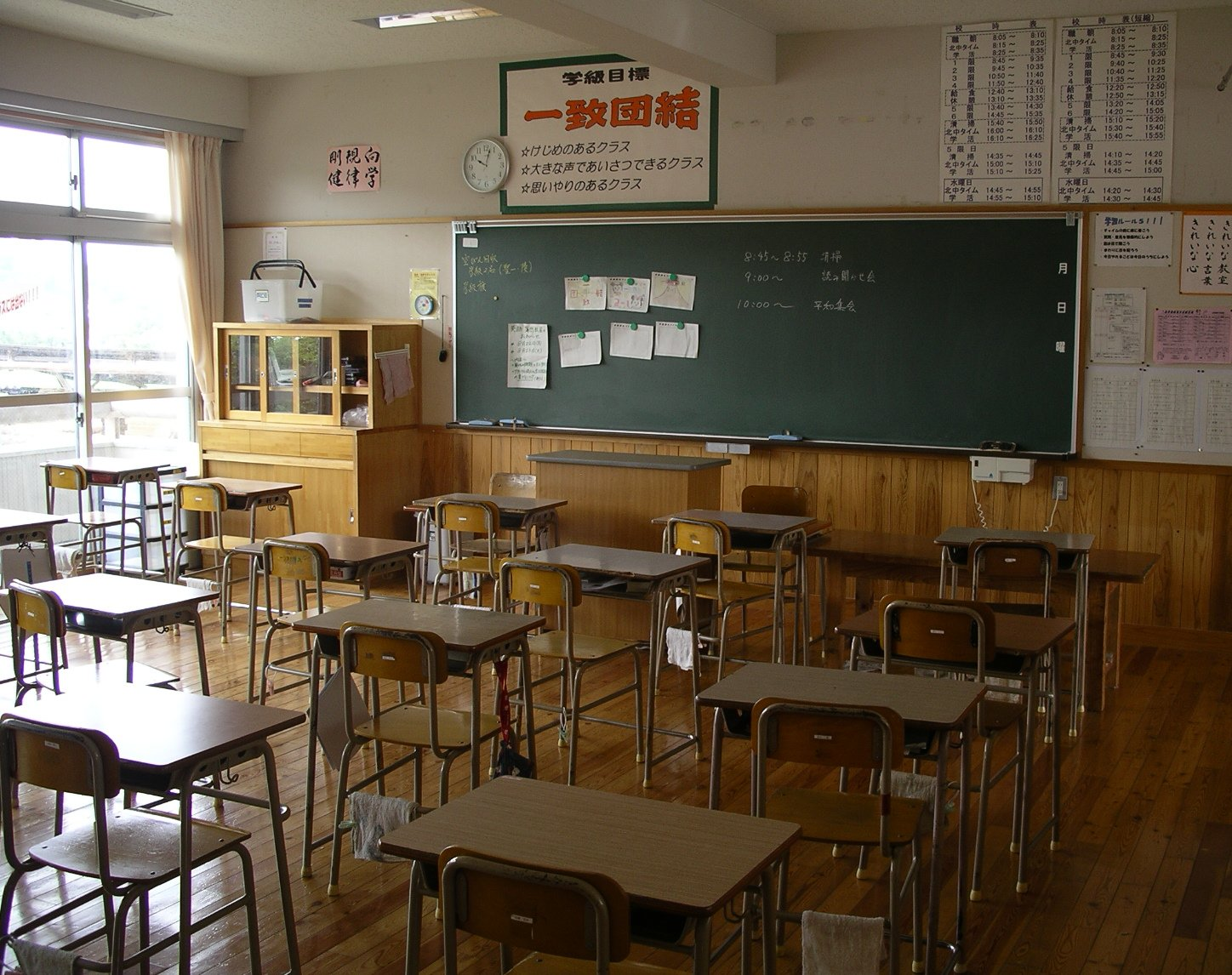
A typical Japanese classroom

Lower-secondary schools cover grades seven, eight, and nine. Ages are 12/13 through 14/15 years old with increased focus on academic studies. Although it is possible to leave the formal education system after completing lower secondary school and find employment, fewer than 4% did so by the late 1980s.

Most junior high schools in the 1980s were government-funded public schools; 5% were private schools. At ¥552,592 (US$3,490.44) per pupil, private schools had a per-student cost that was four times as high as public schools.

=== Instruction ===
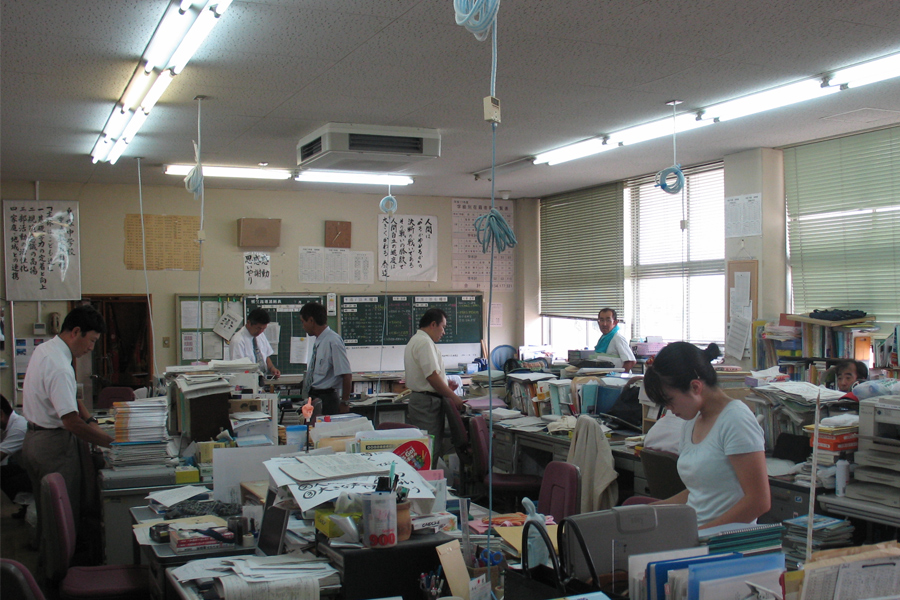
A teachers' room at a junior high school

Instruction tends to rely on the lecture method. Teachers also use other media, such as television and radio, and laboratory work is often involved. By 1989, about 45% of all public lower-secondary schools had computers, including schools that used them only for administrative purposes. Classroom organization is still based on small work groups, although no longer for reasons of discipline. Students are expected to have mastered daily routines and acceptable behavior.

Teachers usually major in the subjects they teach. Each class is assigned a homeroom teacher who doubles as counselor. Unlike elementary students, junior high school students have different teachers for different subjects. The subject teachers usually move to a new room for each 50-minute period. Usually, students' lunch is provided by the school itself.

=== Curriculum ===
All course contents are specified in the Course of Study for Lower-Secondary Schools curriculum. Some subjects, such as Japanese language and mathematics, are coordinated with the elementary curriculum. The curriculum covers Japanese language, English, social studies, mathematics, science, music, fine arts, industrial arts, homemaking, health, and physical education. Moral education and special activities continue to receive attention.

The minimum number of school days in a year is 210 in Japan, compared to 180 in the United States. A significant part of the school calendar is taken up by non-academic events such as sports days and school trips.

=== Extracurricular activities ===
Many students participate in after-school clubs. Sports clubs, such as baseball, are especially popular among boys, while wind bands are one of the most popular clubs for girls. Football (soccer) clubs are gaining popularity. Other popular sports clubs include tennis, basketball, gymnastics, judo and volleyball. In every sport, many games are held between schools and at the regional level, so students have opportunities to compete.

For cultural clubs, choir and art clubs, brass band, tea ceremony, and flower arrangement clubs are popular.

Some junior high schools encourage students to take academic ability tests such as the STEP Eiken for English or the Kanji Kentei for Japanese.

Students in the highest grades of elementary, junior high, and senior high schools also take trips lasting up to several days to culturally important cities such as Kyoto and Nara, ski resorts, or other places such as Tokyo, Osaka, Okinawa and Hokkaido.

== Senior high school ==
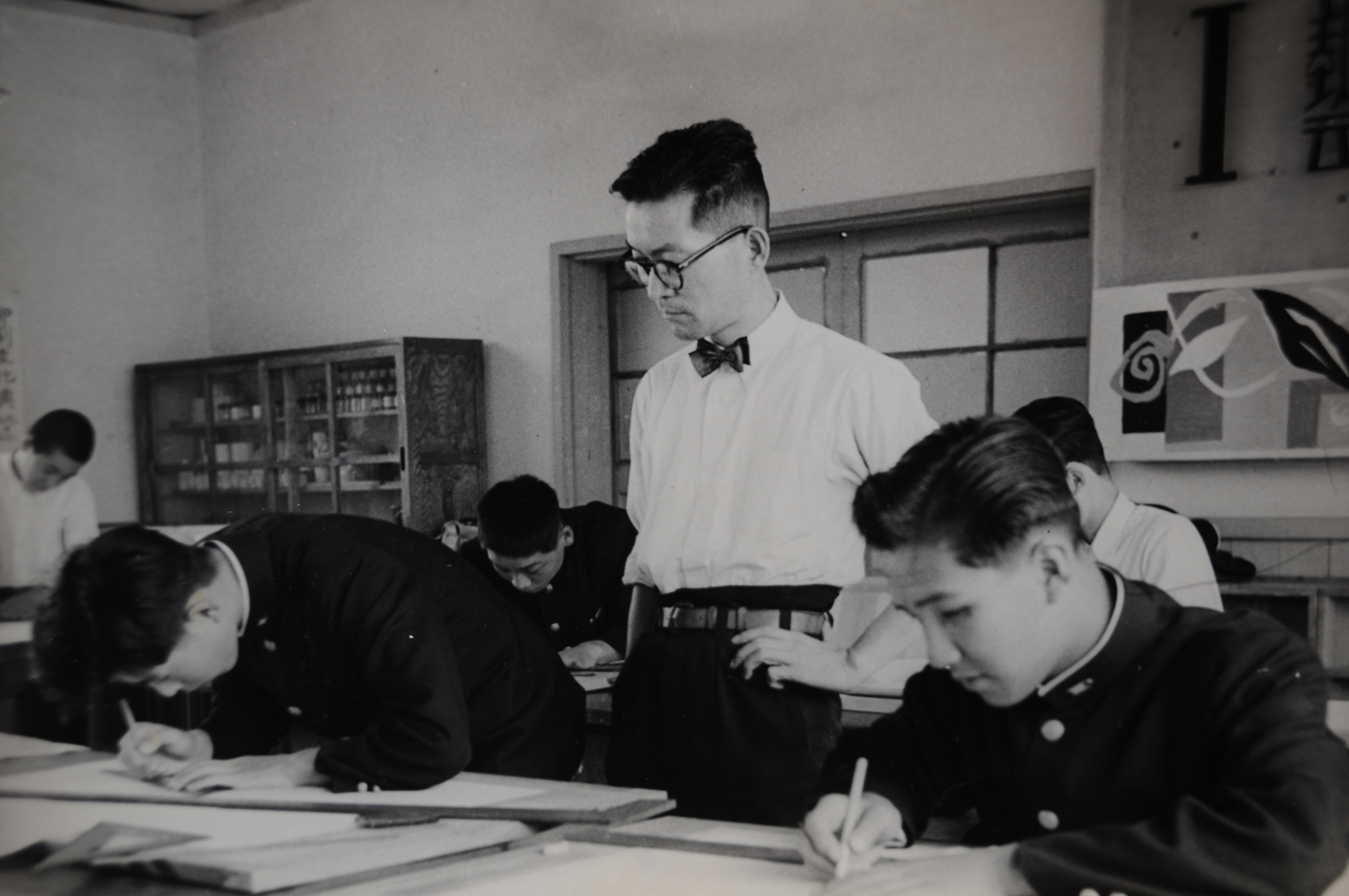
A high school class in 1963

Even though upper secondary school is not compulsory in Japan, as of 2005, 94% of all junior high school graduates entered high schools and over 95% of students graduated successfully from them.

To enter, students typically take an entrance examination in Japanese, mathematics, science, social studies, and English, whether it is standardized for all public high schools in the prefecture or a test created by a private high school for that school alone.

=== Daily life ===
High schools typically begin at 8:30 AM, when teachers meet for a five-minute meeting, followed by homeroom. Students assemble in their homerooms of an average of around 40 students each, Homeroom teachers are in charge of morning or afternoon homeroom times, about five minutes each, as well as a weekly long homeroom period.

Many students are assigned to specific task committees in their homeroom class.

There are four classes of 50 minutes each before lunch. Students go to different classrooms for physical education, laboratory classes, or other specialized courses; otherwise, teachers change classrooms instead of the students for the entire day. Students typically attend between ten and fourteen courses a year.

Some schools do not have their own cafeteria, so students generally eat in their homerooms instead. Unlike students in elementary and middle school, high school students do not have government-subsidized lunches. Because of this, many students bring bento from home. After lunch students have two more classes. Typically, by 3:30 PM, students are free to attend extracurricular activities.

Saturday schooling, when offered, ends at 1 PM after four classes.

=== Curriculum ===
Schools have limited autonomy in developing their curriculum or choosing their textbooks. Instead, although the latter are written and produced in the private sector, the Ministry of Education has the final say over any and all content and materials. Typically students take three years each of mathematics, social studies, Japanese, science, and English, with additional courses including physical education, music, art, and moral studies. In particular social studies in Japan is broken down into civics, geography, Japanese history, world history, sociology, and politics/economics. There are a large number of mandatory courses, and a few number of electives.

Upper-secondary teachers are university graduates. Upper-secondary schools are organized into departments, and teachers specialize in their field of study although they teach a variety of courses sharing a more general discipline. Teaching depends largely on the lecture system, with the main goal being to cover the curriculum. Approach and subject coverage tends to be uniform, at least in the public schools.

=== Extracurriculars ===
In most schools, there are two types of extracurricular clubs, sports clubs and culture clubs. New students usually choose a club after the school year begins and only rarely change for the rest of their high school careers. Clubs meet for two hours after school every day, and often during school vacations. These clubs are an important chance for students to make friends and learn social etiquette and relationships like the senpai and kōhai dynamic.

== Education reforms ==
=== Citizenship ===
As part of the movement to develop an integrated curriculum and the education reform movement of the late 1980s, the entire Course of Study for Lower-Secondary Schools was revised in 1989 and took effect in the 1992–93 school year. A main aim of the reform was to equip students with the basic knowledge needed for citizenship. In some measure, this means increased emphasis on Japanese history and culture, as well as understanding Japan as a nation and its relationships with other nations of the world. The course of study also increased elective hours, recommending that electives be chosen in light of individual student differences and with an eye toward diversification.

A further revision to the Fundamental Law of Education was carried out on 22 December 2006. The revised law left the structure of schooling basically the same but included new emphases on respect for Japanese culture (Article 2.5), school discipline (Article 6.2), and parental responsibility (Article 10).

=== Foreign languages ===
The Ministry of Education, Culture, Sports, Science and Technology (MEXT) recognizes a need to improve the teaching of all foreign languages, especially English. To improve instruction in spoken English, the government invites many young native speakers of English to Japan to serve as assistants to school boards and prefectures under its Japan Exchange and Teaching Program. By 2005 participants numbered over 6,000. In the last few years, several school boards in Japan have relied on ALTs (Assistant Language Teacher) from private dispatch companies.

=== Junior high issues ===
Two problems of great concern to educators and citizens began to appear at the lower-secondary level in the 1980s: bullying, which remains a major problem, and the school-refusal syndrome (toko kyohi; manifested by excessive absenteeism), which was on the rise. In 2008, there were 42,754 incidents of problematic behavior in junior high schools, according to a government survey.

Experts disagreed over the specific causes of these phenomena, but there is general agreement that the system offers little individualized or specialized assistance, thus contributing to disaffection among those who can not conform to its demands or who are otherwise experiencing difficulties. Another problem concerns Japanese children returning from abroad. These students, particularly if they have been overseas for extended periods, often need help in reading and writing — and in adjusting to rigid classroom demands. Even making the adjustment does not guarantee acceptance. Besides having acquired a foreign language, many of these students have also acquired foreign customs of speech, dress, and behavior that mark them as different.

=== Senior high issues ===
The upper-secondary curriculum underwent thorough revision in 1989. That year a new Course of Study for Upper-Secondary Schools was announced that was to be phased in beginning with the tenth grade in 1994, followed by the eleventh grade in 1995 and the twelfth grade in 1996. Among noteworthy changes was the requirement that male and female students take a course in home economics. The government was concerned with instilling in all students an awareness of the importance of family life, the roles and responsibilities of family members, the concept of cooperation within the family, and the role of the family in society. Another change of note was the division of the old social studies course into history-and-geography and civics courses.

== See also ==
- Education in Japan
  - Educational reform in occupied Japan
  - Higher education in Japan
