= Filmmaking technique of Akira Kurosawa =

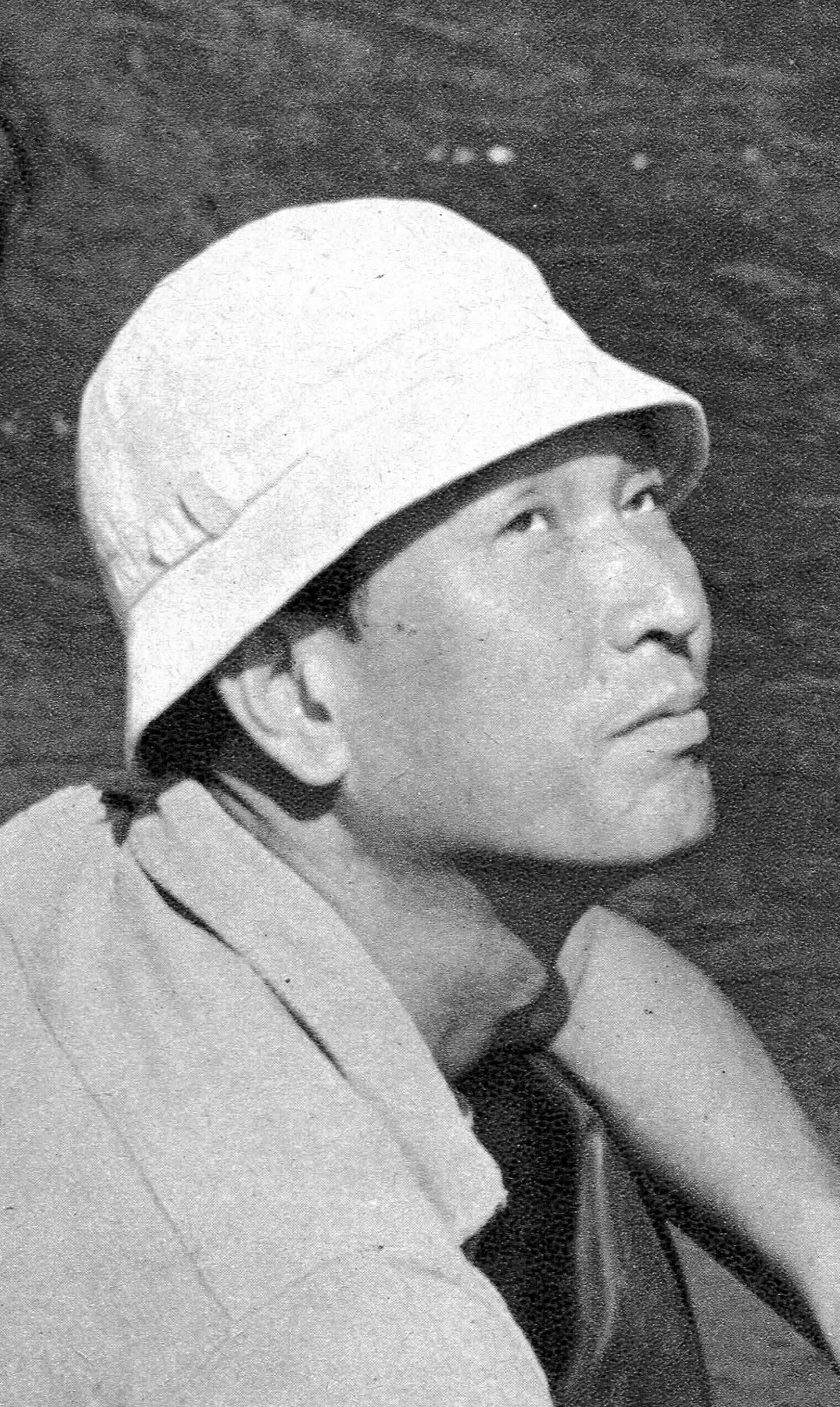
Akira Kurosawa was a completely "hands-on" director, involved in every aspect of filmmaking.

The legacy of filmmaking technique left by Akira Kurosawa (1910–1998) for subsequent generations of filmmakers has been diverse and of international influence beyond his native Japan. The legacy of influence has ranged from working methods, influence on style, and selection and adaptation of themes in cinema. Kurosawa's working method was oriented toward extensive involvement with numerous aspects of film production. He was also an effective screenwriter who would work in close contact with his writers very early in the production cycle to ensure high quality in the scripts which would be used for his films.

Kurosawa's aesthetic visual sense meant that his attention to cinematography and filming was also demanding and often went beyond the attention which directors would normally expect to use with their cameramen. His reputation as an editor of his own films was consistent throughout his lifetime in his insisting on close participation with any other editors involved in the editing of his films. Throughout his career, Kurosawa worked constantly with people drawn from the same pool of creative technicians, crew members and actors, popularly known as the "Kurosawa-gumi" (Japanese: 黒澤組; 'Kurosawa group').

The style associated with Kurosawa's films is marked by a number of innovations which Kurosawa introduced in his films over the decades. In his films of the 1940s and 1950s, Kurosawa introduced innovative uses of the axial cut and the screen wipe which became part of the standard repertoire of filmmaking for subsequent generations of filmmakers. Kurosawa, and his emphasis on sound-image counterpoint, by all accounts always gave great attention to the soundtracks of his films and he was involved with several of Japan's outstanding composers of his generation including Toru Takemitsu.

There are four themes which can be associated with Kurosawa's filmmaking technique which recur from his early films to the films he made at the end of his career. These include his interest in (a) the master-disciple relationship, (b) the heroic champion, (c) the close examination of nature and human nature, and (d) the cycles of violence. Regarding Kurosawa's reflections on the theme of cycles of violence, these found a beginning with Throne of Blood (1957), and became nearly an obsession with historical cycles of inexorable savage violence—what Stephen Prince calls "the countertradition to the committed, heroic mode of Kurosawa's cinema" which Kurosawa would sustain as a thematic interest even toward the end of his career in his last films.

== Working methods ==
All biographical sources, as well as the filmmaker's own comments, indicate that Akira Kurosawa was a completely "hands-on" director, passionately involved in every aspect of the filmmaking process. As one interviewer summarized, "he (co-)writes his scripts, oversees the design, rehearses the actors, sets up all the shots and then does the editing." His active participation extended from the initial concept to the editing and scoring of the final product.

=== Script ===
Kurosawa emphasized time and again that the screenplay was the absolute foundation of a successful film and that, though a mediocre director can sometimes make a passable film out of a good script, even an excellent director can never make a good film out of a bad script. During the postwar period, he began the practice of collaborating with a rotating group of five screenwriters: Eijirō Hisaita, Ryuzo Kikushima, Shinobu Hashimoto, Hideo Oguni, and Masato Ide. Whichever members of this group happened to be working on a particular film would gather around a table, often at a hot-springs resort, where they would not be distracted by the outside world. (Seven Samurai, for example, was written in this fashion.) Often they all (except Oguni, who acted as "referee") would work on exactly the same pages of the script, and Kurosawa would choose the best-written version from the different drafts of each particular scene. This method was adopted "so that each contributor might function as a kind of foil, checking the dominance of any one person's point-of-view."

In addition to the actual script, Kurosawa at this stage often produced extensive, fantastically detailed notes to elaborate his vision. For example, for Seven Samurai, he created six notebooks with (among many other things) detailed biographies of the samurai, including what they wore and ate, how they walked, talked and behaved when greeted, and even how each tied his shoes. For the 101 peasant characters in the film, he created a registry consisting of 23 families and instructed the performers playing these roles to live and work as these "families" for the duration of shooting.

=== Shooting ===
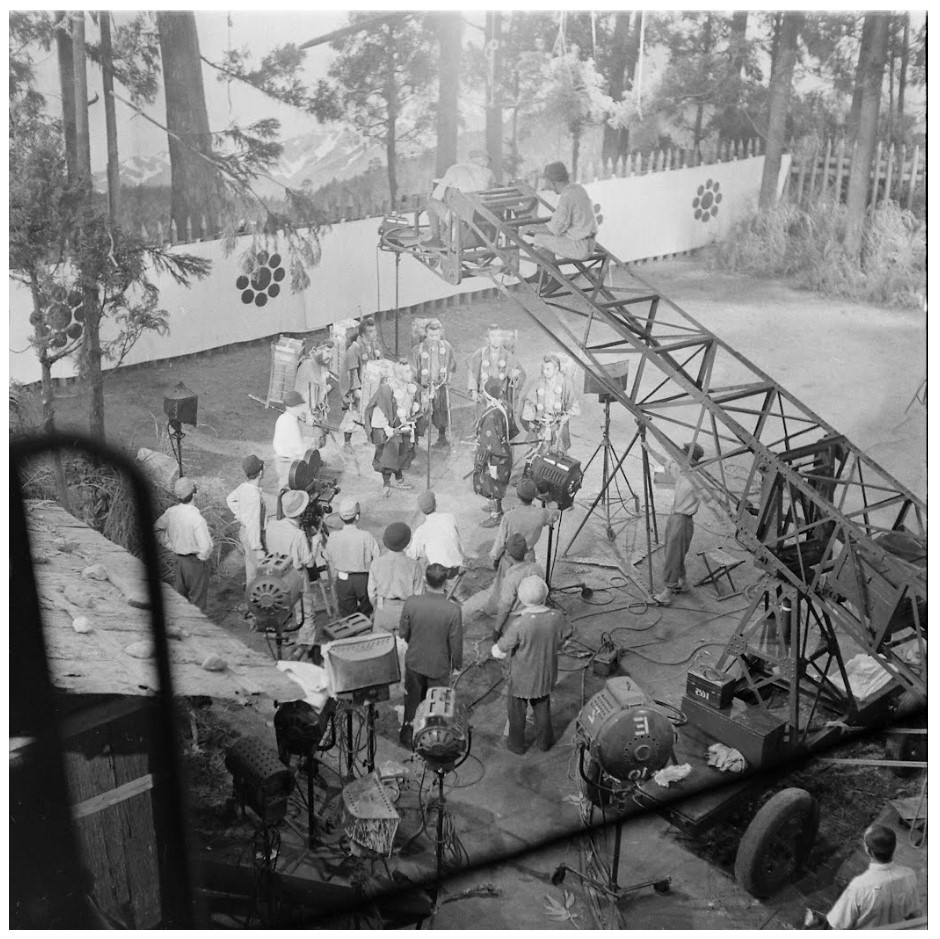
Filming of The Men Who Tread on the Tiger's Tail, 1945

For his early films, although they were consistently well photographed, Kurosawa generally used standard lenses and deep-focus photography. Beginning with Seven Samurai (1954), however, Kurosawa's cinematic technique changed drastically with his extensive use of long lens and multiple cameras. The director claimed that he used these lenses and several cameras rolling at once to help the actors—allowing them to be photographed at some distance from the lens, and without any knowledge of which particular camera's image would be utilized in the final cut—making their performances much more natural. (In fact, Tatsuya Nakadai agreed that the multiple cameras greatly helped his performances with the director.) But these changes had a powerful effect as well on the look of the action scenes in that film, particularly the final battle in the rain. Says Stephen Prince: "He can use the telephoto lenses to get under the horses, in between their hooves, to plunge us into the chaos of that battle in a visual way that is really quite unprecedented, both in Kurosawa's own work and in the samurai genre as a whole."

With The Hidden Fortress (1958), Kurosawa began to utilize the widescreen (anamorphic) process for the first time in his work. These three techniques—long lenses, multiple cameras and widescreen—were in later works fully exploited, even in sequences with little or no overt action, such as the early scenes of High and Low that take place in the central character's home, in which they are employed to dramatize tensions and power relationships between the characters within a highly confined space.

For Throne of Blood (1957), in the scene where Washizu (Toshiro Mifune) is attacked with arrows by his own men, the director had archers shoot real arrows, hollowed out and running along wires, toward Mifune from a distance of about ten feet, with the actor carefully following chalk marks on the ground to avoid being hit. (Some of the arrows missed him by an inch; the actor, who admitted that he was not merely acting terrified in the film, suffered nightmares afterward.)

For Red Beard (1965), to construct the gate for the clinic set, Kurosawa had his assistants dismantle rotten wood from old sets and then create the prop from scratch with this old wood, so the gate would look properly ravaged by time. For the same film, for teacups that appeared in the movie, his crew poured fifty years' worth of tea into the cups so they would appear appropriately stained.

For Ran (1985), art director Yoshirō Muraki, constructing the "third castle" set under the director's supervision, created the "stones" of that castle by having photographs taken of actual stones from a celebrated castle, then painting Styrofoam blocks to exactly resemble those stones and gluing them to the castle "wall" through a process known as "rough-stone piling", which required months of work. Later, before shooting the famous scene in which the castle is attacked and set on fire, in order to prevent the Styrofoam "stones" from melting in the heat, the art department coated the surface with four layers of cement, then painted the colors of the ancient stones onto the cement.

=== Editing ===
Kurosawa both directed and edited most of his films, which is nearly unique among prominent filmmakers. (Note: See List of film director and editor collaborations. The Coen Brothers are perhaps the best known contemporary filmmakers who both direct and edit their films.) Kurosawa often remarked that he shot a film simply in order to have material to edit, because the editing of a picture was the most important and creatively interesting part of the process for him. Kurosawa's creative team believed that the director's skill with editing was his greatest talent. Hiroshi Nezu, a longtime production supervisor on his films, said, "Among ourselves, we think that he is Toho's best director, that he is Japan's best scenarist, and that he is the best editor in the world. He is most concerned with the flowing quality which a film must have ... The Kurosawa film flows over the cut, as it were."

The director's frequent crew member Teruyo Nogami confirms this view. "Akira Kurosawa's editing was exceptional, the inimitable work of a genius ... No one was a match for him." She claimed that Kurosawa carried in his head all the information about all shots filmed, and if, in the editing room, he asked for a piece of film and she handed him the wrong one, he would immediately recognize the error, though she had taken detailed notes on each shot and he had not. She compared his mind to a computer, which could do with edited segments of film what computers do today.

Kurosawa's habitual method was to edit a film daily, bit by bit, during production. This helped particularly when he started using multiple cameras, which resulted in a large amount of film to assemble. "I always edit in the evening if we have a fair amount of footage in the can. After watching the rushes, I usually go to the editing room and work." Because of this practice of editing as he went along, the post-production period for a Kurosawa film could be startlingly brief: Yojimbo (1961) had its Japanese premiere on April 20, 1961, four days after shooting concluded on April 16.

== "Kurosawa-gumi" ==
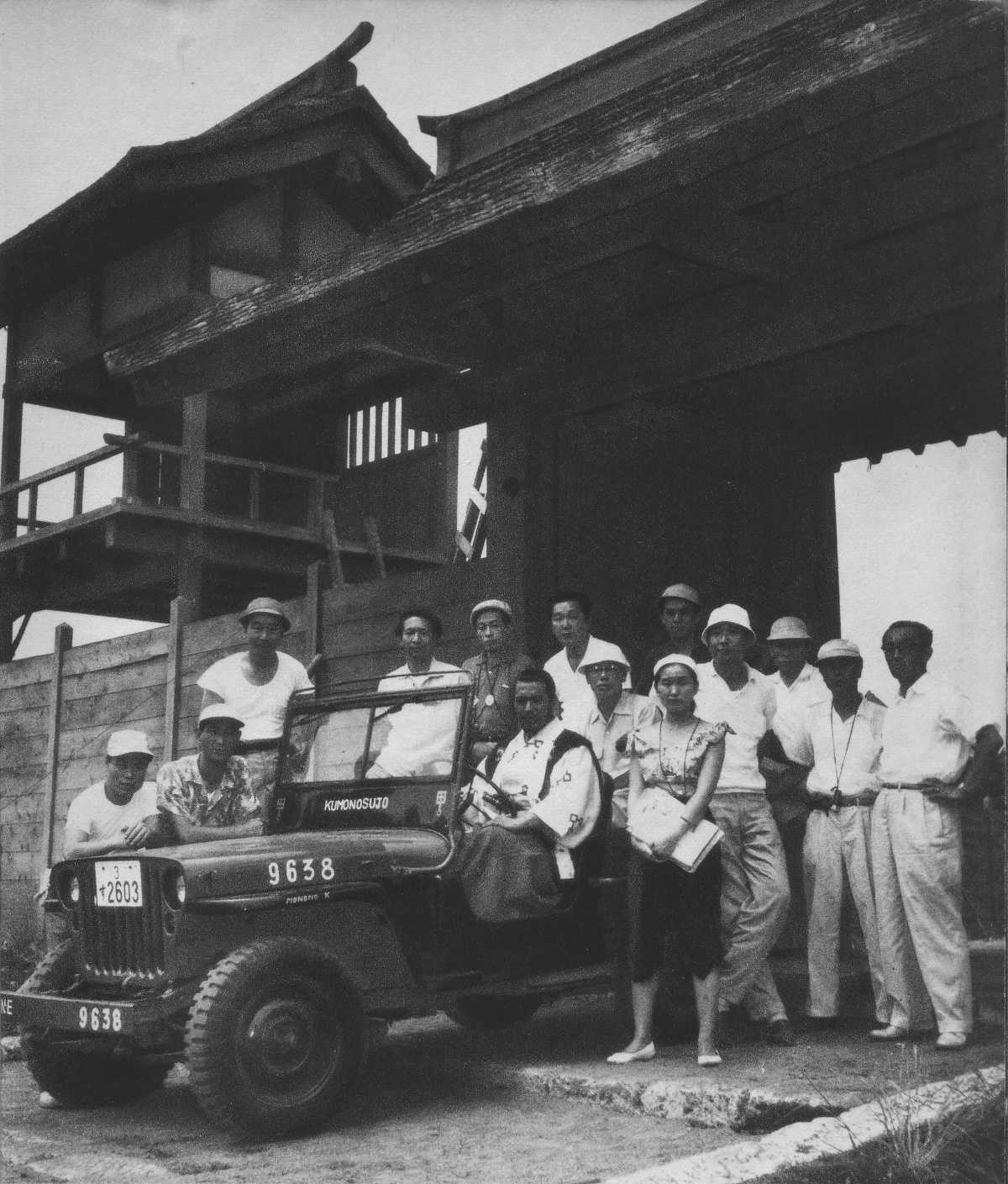
Cast and crew of Throne of Blood taken in 1956, showing some of the Kurosawa-gumi. (From left to right) Shinjin Akiike, Fumio Yanoguchi, Kuichiro Kishida, Samaji Nonagase, Takao Saito, Toshiro Mifune (in the jeep), Minoru Chiaki, Takashi Shimura, Teruyo Nogami (scripter), Yoshirō Muraki, Akira Kurosawa, Hiroshi Nezu, Asakazu Nakai, and Sōjirō Motoki.

Throughout his career, Kurosawa worked constantly with people drawn from the same pool of creative technicians, crew members and actors, popularly known as the "Kurosawa-gumi" (Kurosawa group). The following is a partial list of this group, divided by profession. This information is derived from the IMDb pages for Kurosawa's films and Stuart Galbraith IV's filmography:

Composers: Fumio Hayasaka (Drunken Angel, Stray Dog, Scandal, Rashomon, The Idiot, Ikiru, Seven Samurai, I Live in Fear); Masaru Sato (Throne of Blood, The Lower Depths, The Hidden Fortress, The Bad Sleep Well, Yojimbo, Sanjuro, High and Low, Red Beard); Tōru Takemitsu (Dodeskaden, Ran); Shin'ichirō Ikebe (Kagemusha, Dreams, Rhapsody in August, Madadayo).

Cinematographers: Asakazu Nakai (No Regrets for Our Youth, One Wonderful Sunday, Stray Dog, Ikiru, Seven Samurai, I Live in Fear, Throne of Blood, High and Low, Red Beard, Dersu Uzala, Ran); Kazuo Miyagawa (Rashomon, Yojimbo); (Note: Miyagawa was hired as cinematographer for Kagemusha, but about one month into shooting, eye problems caused by diabetes forced him to drop out of the project.) Kazuo Yamazaki (The Lower Depths, The Hidden Fortress); Takao Saito (Sanjuro, High and Low, Red Beard, Dodeskaden, Kagemusha, Ran, Dreams, Rhapsody in August, Madadayo).

Art Department: Yoshirō Muraki served as either assistant art director, art director or production designer for all Kurosawa's films (except for Dersu Uzala) from Drunken Angel until the end of the director's career. The 1,400 uniforms and suits of armor used for the extras in the film Ran were designed by costume designer Emi Wada and Kurosawa, and were handmade by master tailors over more than two years, for which the film won its sole Academy Award.

Production Crew: Teruyo Nogami served as script supervisor, production manager, associate director or assistant to the producer on all of Kurosawa's films from Rashomon (1950) to the end of the director's career. Hiroshi Nezu was production supervisor or unit production manager on all the films from Seven Samurai to Dodeskaden, except Sanjuro. After retiring as a director, Ishirō Honda returned more than 30 years later to work again for his friend and former mentor as a directorial advisor, production coordinator and creative consultant on Kurosawa's last five films (Kagemusha, Ran, Dreams, Rhapsody in August and Madadayo).

Actors: Leading actors: Takashi Shimura (21 films); Toshiro Mifune (16 films), Susumu Fujita (8 films), Tatsuya Nakadai (6 films) and Masayuki Mori (5 films). Supporting performers (in alphabetical order): Minoru Chiaki, Kamatari Fujiwara, Bokuzen Hidari, Fumiko Homma, Hisashi Igawa, Yunosuke Ito, Kyōko Kagawa, Daisuke Katō, Isao Kimura, Kokuten Kodo, Akitake Kono, Yoshio Kosugi, Koji Mitsui, Seiji Miyaguchi, Eiko Miyoshi, Nobuo Nakamura, Akemi Negishi, Denjiro Okochi, Noriko Sengoku, Gen Shimizu, Ichiro Sugai, Haruo Tanaka, Akira Terao, Eijirō Tōno, Yoshio Tsuchiya, Kichijiro Ueda, Atsushi Watanabe, Isuzu Yamada, Tsutomu Yamazaki and Yoshitaka Zushi.

== Style ==
Virtually all commentators have noted Kurosawa's bold, dynamic style, which many have compared to the traditional Hollywood style of narrative moviemaking, one that emphasizes, in the words of one such scholar, "chronological, causal, linear and historical thinking". But it has also been claimed that, from his very first film, the director displayed a technique quite distinct from the seamless style of classic Hollywood. This technique involved a disruptive depiction of screen space through the use of numerous unrepeated camera setups, a disregard for the traditional 180-degree axis of action around which Hollywood scenes have usually been constructed, and an approach in which "narrative time becomes spatialized", with fluid camera movement often replacing conventional editing. The following are some idiosyncratic aspects of the artist's style.

=== Axial cut ===
In his films of the 1940s and 1950s, Kurosawa frequently employs the "axial cut", in which the camera moves closer to, or further away from, the subject, not through the use of tracking shots or dissolves, but through a series of matched jump cuts. For example, in Sanshiro Sugata Part II (1945), the hero takes leave of the woman he loves, but then, after walking away a short distance, turns and bows to her, and then, after walking further, turns and bows once more. This sequence of shots is illustrated on film scholar David Bordwell's blog. The three shots are not connected in the film by camera movements or dissolves, but by a series of two jump cuts. The effect is to stress the duration of Sanshiro's departure.

In the opening sequence of Seven Samurai in the peasant village, the axial cut is used twice. When the villagers are outdoors, gathered in a circle, weeping and lamenting the imminent arrival of the bandits, they are glimpsed from above in extreme long shot, then, after the cut, in a much closer shot, then in an even closer shot at ground level as the dialogue begins. A few minutes later, when the villagers go to the mill to ask the village elder's advice, there is a long shot of the mill, with a slowly turning wheel in the river, then a closer shot of this wheel, and then a still closer shot of it. (As the mill is where the elder lives, these shots forge a mental association in the viewer's mind between that character and the mill.)

=== Cutting on motion ===
A number of scholars have pointed out Kurosawa's tendency to "cut on motion": that is, to edit a sequence of a character or characters in motion so that an action is depicted in two or more separate shots, rather than one uninterrupted shot. One scholar, as an example, describes a tense scene in Seven Samurai in which the samurai Shichirōji, who is standing, wishes to console the peasant Manzo, who is sitting on the ground, and he gets down on one knee to talk to him. Kurosawa chooses to film this simple action in two shots rather than one (cutting between the two only after the action of kneeling has begun) to fully convey Shichirōji's humility. Numerous other instances of this device are evident in the movie. "Kurosawa [frequently] breaks up the action, fragments it, in order to create an emotional effect."

=== Wipe ===
A form of cinematic punctuation very strongly identified with Kurosawa is the wipe. This is an effect created through an optical printer, in which, when a scene ends, a line or bar appears to move across the screen, "wiping" away the image while simultaneously revealing the first image of the subsequent scene. As a transitional device, it is used as a substitute for the straight cut or the dissolve (though Kurosawa, of course, often used both of those devices as well). In his mature work, Kurosawa employed the wipe so frequently that it became a kind of signature.

There are a number of theories concerning the purpose of this device, which, as James Goodwin notes, was common in silent cinema but became considerably rarer in the more "realistic" sound cinema. Goodwin claims that the wipes in Rashomon, for instance, fulfill one of three purposes: emphasizing motion in traveling shots, marking narrative shifts in the courtyard scenes and marking temporal ellipses between actions (e.g., between the end of one character's testimony and the beginning of another's). He also points out that in The Lower Depths (1957), in which Kurosawa completely avoided the use of wipes, the director cleverly manipulated people and props "in order to slide new visual images in and out of view much as a wipe cut does".

An instance of the wipe used as a satirical device can be seen in Ikiru (1952). A group of women visit the local government office to petition the bureaucrats to turn a waste area into a children's playground. The viewer is then shown a series of point of view shots of various bureaucrats, connected by wipe transitions, each of whom refers the group to another department. Nora Tennessen comments in her blog (which shows one example) that "the wipe technique makes [the sequence] funnier—images of bureaucrats are stacked like cards, each more punctilious than the last."

=== Image-sound counterpoint ===
Kurosawa by all accounts always gave great attention to the soundtracks of his films (Teruyo Nogami's memoir gives many such examples). In the late 1940s, he began to employ music for what he called "counterpoint" to the emotional content of a scene, rather than merely to reinforce the emotion, as Hollywood traditionally did (and still does). The inspiration for this innovation came from a family tragedy. When news reached Kurosawa of his father's death in 1948, he wandered aimlessly through the streets of Tokyo. His sorrow was magnified rather than diminished when he suddenly heard the cheerful, vapid song "The Cuckoo Waltz", and he hurried to escape from this "awful music". He then told his composer, Fumio Hayasaka, with whom he was working on Drunken Angel, to use "The Cuckoo Waltz" as ironic accompaniment to the scene in which the dying gangster, Matsunaga, sinks to his lowest point in the narrative.

This approach to music can also be found in Stray Dog (1949), a film released a year after Drunken Angel. In the climactic scene, the detective Murakami is fighting furiously with the murderer Yusa in a muddy field. The sound of a Mozart piece is suddenly heard, played on the piano by a woman in a nearby house. As one commentator notes, "In contrast to this scene of primitive violence, the serenity of the Mozart is, literally, other-worldly" and "the power of this elemental encounter is heightened by the music." Nor was Kurosawa's "ironic" use of the soundtrack limited to music. One critic observes that, in Seven Samurai, "During episodes of murder and mayhem, birds chirp in the background, as they do in the first scene when the farmers lament their seemingly hopeless fate."

== Recurring themes ==
=== Master–disciple relationship ===
Many commentators have noted the frequent occurrence in Kurosawa's work of the complex relationship between an older and a younger man, who serve each other as master and disciple, respectively. This theme was clearly an expression of the director's life experience. "Kurosawa revered his teachers, in particular Kajiro Yamamoto, his mentor at Toho", according to Joan Mellen. "The salutary image of an older person instructing the young evokes always in Kurosawa's films high moments of pathos." The critic Tadao Sato considers the recurring character of the "master" to be a type of surrogate father, whose role it is to witness the young protagonist's moral growth and approve of it.

In his very first film, Sanshiro Sugata (1943), after the judo master Yano becomes the title character's teacher and spiritual guide, "the narrative [is] cast in the form of a chronicle studying the stages of the hero's growing mastery and maturity." The master-pupil relationship in the films of the postwar era—as depicted in such works as Drunken Angel, Stray Dog, Seven Samurai, Red Beard and Dersu Uzala—involves very little direct instruction, but much learning through experience and example; Stephen Prince relates this tendency to the private and nonverbal nature of the concept of Zen enlightenment.

By the time of Kagemusha (1980), however, according to Prince, the meaning of this relationship has changed. A thief chosen to act as the double of a great lord continues his impersonation even after his master's death: "the relationship has become spectral and is generated from beyond the grave with the master maintaining a ghostly presence. Its end is death, not the renewal of commitment to the living that typified its outcome in earlier films." However, according to the director's biographer, in his final film, 1993's Madadayo—which deals with a teacher and his relationship with an entire group of ex-pupils—a sunnier vision of the theme emerges: "The students hold an annual party for their professor, attended by dozens of former students, now adults of varying age ... This extended sequence ... expresses, as only Kurosawa can, the simple joys of student-teacher relationships, of kinship, of being alive."

=== Heroic champion ===
Kurosawa's is a heroic cinema, a series of dramas (mostly) concerned with the deeds and fates of larger-than-life heroes. Stephen Prince has identified the emergence of the unique Kurosawa protagonist with the immediate post-World War II period. The goal of the American Occupation to replace Japanese feudalism with individualism coincided with the director's artistic and social agenda: "Kurosawa welcomed the changed political climate and sought to fashion his own mature cinematic voice." The Japanese critic Tadao Sato concurs: "With defeat in World War II, many Japanese ... were dumbfounded to find that the government had lied to them and was neither just nor dependable. During this uncertain time Akira Kurosawa, in a series of first-rate films, sustained the people by his consistent assertion that the meaning of life is not dictated by the nation but something each individual should discover for himself through suffering." The filmmaker himself remarked that, during this period, "I felt that without the establishment of the self as a positive value there could be no freedom and no democracy."

The first such postwar hero was, atypically for the artist, a heroine—Yukie, played by Setsuko Hara, in No Regrets for Our Youth (1946). According to Prince, her "desertion of family and class background to assist a poor village, her perseverance in the face of enormous obstacles, her assumption of responsibility for her own life and for the well-being of others, and her existential loneliness ... are essential to Kurosawan heroism and make of Yukie the first coherent ... example." This "existential loneliness" is also exemplified by Dr. Sanada (Takashi Shimura) in Drunken Angel: "Kurosawa insists that his heroes take their stand, alone, against tradition and battle for a better world, even if the path there is not clear. Separation from a corrupt social system in order to alleviate human suffering, as Sanada does, is the only honorable course."

Many commentators regard Seven Samurai as the ultimate expression of the artist's heroic ideal. Joan Mellen's comments are typical of this view: "Seven Samurai is above all a homage to the samurai class at its most noble ... Samurai for Kurosawa represent the best of Japanese tradition and integrity." It is because of, not in spite of, the chaotic times of civil war depicted in the film that the seven rise to greatness. "Kurosawa locates the unexpected benefits no less than the tragedy of this historical moment. The upheaval forces samurai to channel the selflessness of their credo of loyal service into working for peasants." However, this heroism is futile because "there was already rising ... a merchant class which would supplant the warrior aristocracy." So the courage and supreme skill of the central characters will not prevent the ultimate destruction of themselves or their class.

As Kurosawa's career progressed he seemed to find it increasingly difficult to sustain the heroic ideal. As Prince notes, "Kurosawa's is an essentially tragic vision of life, and this sensibility ... impedes his efforts to realize a socially committed mode of filmmaking." Furthermore, the director's ideal of heroism is subverted by history itself: "When history is articulated as it is in Throne of Blood, as a blind force ... heroism ceases to be a problem or a reality." According to Prince, the filmmaker's vision eventually became so bleak that he would come to view history merely as eternally recurring patterns of violence, within which the individual is depicted as not only unheroic, but utterly helpless (see "Cycles of violence" below).

=== Nature and weather ===
Nature is a crucial element in Kurosawa's films. According to Stephen Prince, "Kurosawa's sensibility, like that of many Japanese artists, is keenly sensitive to the subtleties and beauties of season and scenery." He has never hesitated to exploit climate and weather as plot elements, to the point where they become "active participants in the drama ... The oppressive heat in Stray Dog and I Live in Fear is omnipresent and becomes thematized as a signifier of a world disjointed by economic collapse and the atomic threat." The director himself once said, "I like hot summers, cold winters, heavy rains and snows, and I think most of my pictures show this. I like extremes because I find them most alive."

Wind is also a powerful symbol: "The persistent metaphor of Kurosawa's work is that of wind, the winds of change, of fortune and adversity." "The visually flamboyant [final] battle [of Yojimbo] takes place in the main street, as huge clouds of dust swirl around the combatants ... The winds that stir the dust ... have brought firearms to the town along with the culture of the West, which will end the warrior tradition."

It is also difficult not to notice the importance of rain to Kurosawa: "Rain in Kurosawa's films is never treated neutrally. When it occurs ... it is never a drizzle or a light mist but always a frenzied downpour, a driving storm." "The final battle [in Seven Samurai] is a supreme spiritual and physical struggle, and it is fought in a blinding rainstorm, which enables Kurosawa to visualize an ultimate fusion of social groups ... but this climactic vision of classlessness, with typical Kurosawan ambivalence, has become a vision of horror. The battle is a vortex of swirling rain and mud ... The ultimate fusion of social identity emerges as an expression of hellish chaos."

=== Cycles of violence ===
Beginning with Throne of Blood (1957), an obsession with historical cycles of inexorable savage violence—what Stephen Prince calls "the countertradition to the committed, heroic mode of Kurosawa's cinema"—first appears. According to Donald Richie, within the world of that film, "Cause and effect is the only law. Freedom does not exist." and Prince claims that its events "are inscribed in a cycle of time that infinitely repeats." He uses as evidence the fact that Washizu's lord, unlike the kindly King Duncan of Shakespeare's play, had murdered his own lord years before to seize power, and is then murdered in turn by Washizu (the Macbeth character) for the same reason. "The fated quality to the action of Macbeth ... was transposed by Kurosawa with a sharpened emphasis upon predetermined action and the crushing of human freedom beneath the laws of karma."

Prince claims that Kurosawa's last epics, Kagemusha and particularly Ran, mark a major turning point in the director's vision of the world. In Kagemusha, "where once [in the world of his films] the individual [hero] could grasp events tightly and demand that they conform to his or her impulses, now the self is but the epiphenomenon of a ruthless and bloody temporal process, ground to dust beneath the weight and force of history." The following epic, Ran, is "a relentless chronicle of base lust for power, betrayal of the father by his sons, and pervasive wars and murders." The historical setting of the film is used as "a commentary on what Kurosawa now perceives as the timelessness of human impulses toward violence and self-destruction." "History has given way to a perception of life as a wheel of endless suffering, ever turning, ever repeating", which is compared in many instances in the screenplay with hell. "Kurosawa has found hell to be both the inevitable outcome of human behavior and the appropriate visualization of his own bitterness and disappointment."

== See also ==
- Cinematography
- Filmmaking
- Cinematographer
- 3D film
