= Takigawa =

Takigawa (written: 滝川, 瀧川, or 多岐川) is a Japanese surname. Notable people with the surname include:

- Takigawa Kazumasu (1525–1586), Sengoku period samurai retainer
- Christel Takigawa (born 1977), Japanese television announcer and news presenter
- Eiji Takigawa (born 1979), Japanese actor, singer, and entertainer
- Yumi Takigawa (born 1951), Japanese actress and singer

== See also ==
- alternate spelling of Takikawa, Hokkaidō, Japanese city
- Takigawa incident, an incident at Kyoto University during the 1930s
