= Civil Information and Education Section =

The Civil Information and Education Section (Japanese: 民間情報教育局(Minkan Jōhō Kyōikukyoku)) or CIE was one of the divisions of the General Headquarters of the Allied Powers (GHQ/SCAP) Staff Department, in charge of measures related to education, religion and cultural property conducted by Allied forces in Japan and Korea during the occupation of Japan after the end of World War II. It existed from September 1945 to April 1952.

It was involved in controlling and censoring media and educational content in Japan, overseeing newspapers, radio broadcasts, movies, and books to ensure they aligned with the Allied objectives of democratization and demilitarization. It played a major part in Japan's postwar educational reform, restructuring the curriculum to emphasize democratic values and critical thinking. It sought more generally through various campaigns to promote change in cultural norms, such as fostering individualism, gender equality, and democracy.

It is said to have had a lasting impact on Japanese society in its promotion of a liberal democratic society.

== History ==
The CIE was initially established in the Yokohama General Headquarters, US Pacific Command, on September 22, 1945, through General Orders 193. It was formed initially as an independent staff group from two different organizations, the Education Branch of the Public Affairs Division and the Information Dissemination Section, which themselves had been created only a few months before. On October 2 of the same year, it was incorporated into General Headquarters and moved to the Radio Tokyo Building in Hibiya Park.

After several reorganizations in the course of the occupation administration, the CIE as an organization was abolished at the end of the occupation on 28 April 1952.

== Organization ==
The first Chief of Section was Brigadier General Kermit R. Dyke, formerly a vice-president of the National Broadcasting Company. In May 1946, Lieutenant Colonel Donald R. Nugent became the second Chief.

=== Organisational structure ===
CIE consisted of the following four groups and seven committees

- Primary Group初等班
- Secondary Group中等班
- Higher Secondary Group高等班
- Special Education Group 特種教育班
- Cooperation Committee 協同委員会
- Teacher training committee 教員養成委員会
- Higher School Investigation Committee 高等調査委員会
- Textbooks and educational materials licensing committee 教科書および教育資料許可調査委員会
- Research and Information Committee 調査情報委員会
- Review Committee 審査委員会
- Liaison Committee 連絡委員会

=== Membership ===
Members of the Bureau who have served <bullet>

- Don Brown - Chief of the Information Section
- David Conde - first head of the Film Unit
- John Pelzel - Chief of the Public Opinion and Social Research Section
- Walter Crosby Eales - Adviser
- Robert B. Downs - Special Adviser
- Frank Shozo Baba - Radio Section
- Winfield Niblo - Instructor
- William Bunce - Chief, Religious Resources Section
- William Woodard - Religious and Cultural Resources Section
- Lulu Holmes - Chief, Religious and Cultural Resources Section
- Mark Orr - Education Section Chief
- Ernest Sato - Photographer
- Suekichi Akaba (photographer)
- Erimichi Asai - Advisor
- Joji Saito - Advisor
- Eitaro Suzuki - Advisor
- Takeuchi Toshimi - Advisor, Public Opinion and Social Research Department
- Keigo Seki - Adviser
- Hideo Kishimoto - Advisor, Religious Administration
- Taeko Nakamura

== Activities ==
The CIE undertook a very wide range of educational and cultural reforms in occupied Japan, including education in general (primary, secondary and higher education, social education), qualification of education personnel, various media (newspapers, magazines, radio), arts (film, theater), religion (Shinto, Buddhism, Christianity, emerging religions), public opinion research, and cultural property protection. Compared to Germany and Italy, which were also defeated, control over Japan was stricter.

=== News media ===
The initial role of the CIE in news media was to promote an independent press as part of its support for democratization. The CIE intervened to prompt reform the press club system in 1949.

=== Film censorship ===
During the occupation, completed films had to be shown to two organisations, the CIE for civilian censorship. and the Civil Censorship Detachment (CCD) for military censorship. Themes that could lead to censorship included militarism, anti-democracy, nationalism, as well as sensitive topics such as the atomic bombings that ended the war.

=== Educational reform ===
The CIE was involved in the enactment of the Fundamental Law of Education through the Education Reform Commission and other committees, the establishment of the National Diet Library, the promotion of public and school libraries, and the establishment of 23 information centres (CIE libraries) in various parts of Japan.
