= Keinosuke Uekusa =

Japanese screenwriter and novelist

- 植草 圭之助
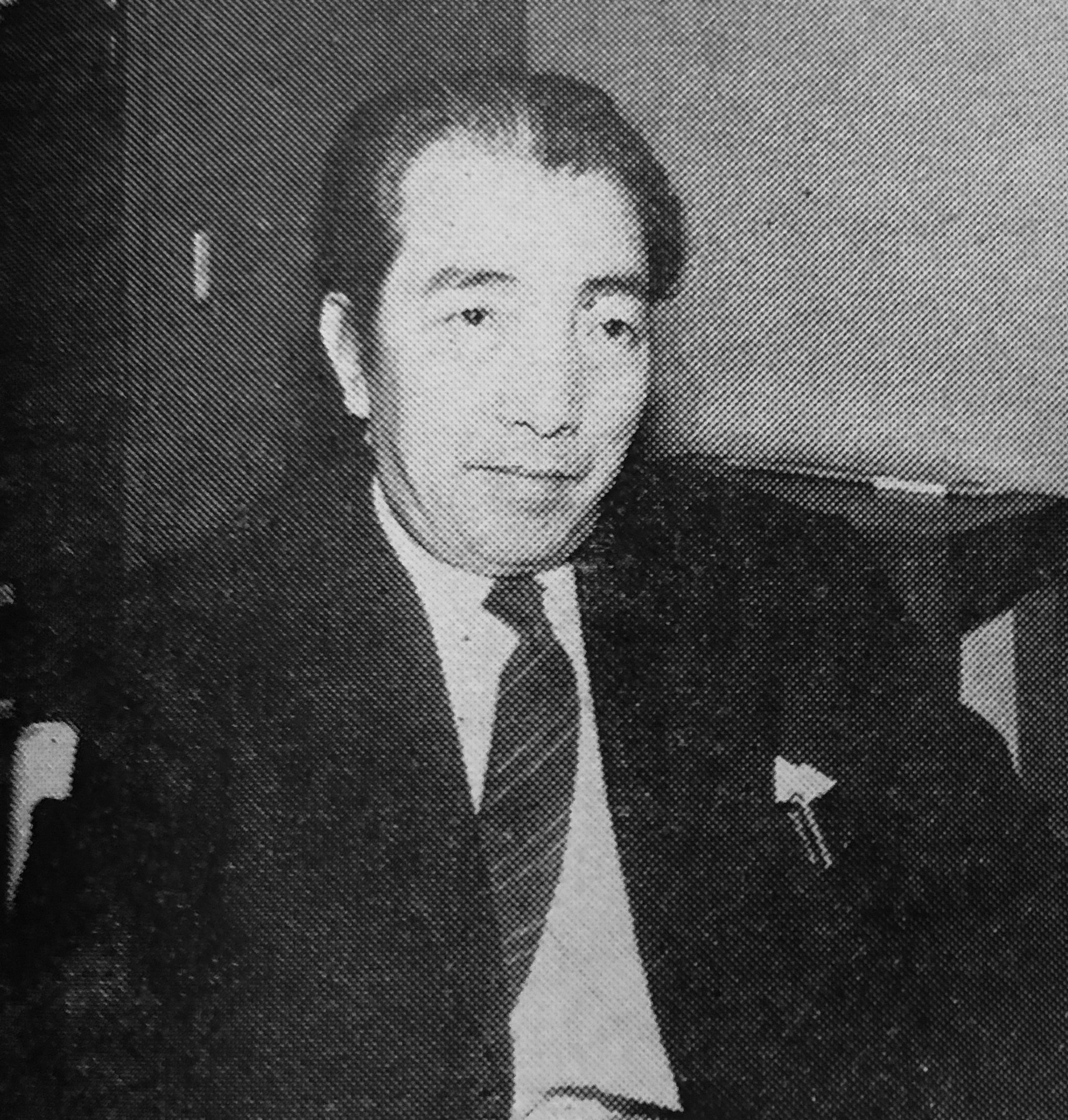
- Uekusa in 1961
- Born: 5 March 1910; Tokyo Prefecture, Empire of Japan
- Died: 19 December 1993 (aged 83)
- Occupations: Screenwriter; playwright; novelist
- Notable work: One Wonderful Sunday (1947) Drunken Angel (1948) Alakazam the Great (1960)

Keinosuke Uekusa (植草 圭之助, Uekusa Keinosuke; 5 March, 1910 – 19 December, 1993) was a Japanese screenwriter, playwright, and novelist. He is known for his longstanding friendship and collaborations with the filmmaker Akira Kurosawa.

== Early life ==
Uekusa was born in Tokyo in 1910. He grew up in a townsman's household. As a child Uekusa attended Kuroda Primary School where he met Akira Kurosawa. They were close friends through their adolescence, as according to Kurosawa, they shared a penchant for being "crybabies" and an admiration for their art teacher, Mr. Tachikawa. (Note: Uekusa contested the assertion that Kurosawa was a "crybaby" in school.) Their relationship led to Kurosawa declaring that he was Sei Shonagon while Uekusa was Murasaki Shikibu, a reference to the rival poets in the Imperial Court of the Heian era, Kurosawa offers the reason for this comparison being that he wrote short impressions while Uekusa wrote long compositions. (Note: This comparison was remembered by Uekusa later in life, per Kurosawa, "I have no recollection whatever of having said this.") Uekusa attended Keika Commerce School after graduating from primary education.

== Career ==
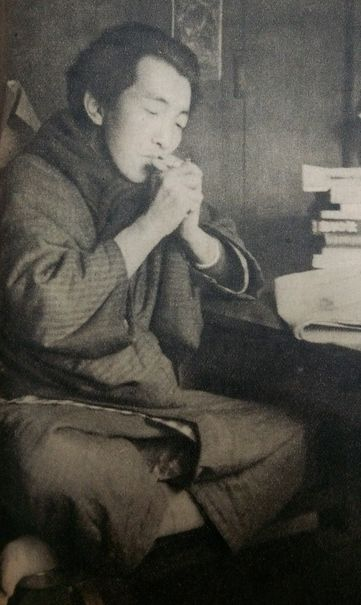
Uekusa in 1948

During the 1930s, Uekusa studied drama but was short of money. He took on odd jobs as a playwright and appeared as an extra in several Toho films. During the Second World War, he wrote screenplays (one of which was published in the periodical Nihon Eiga) and joined the screenwriter's section of Toho. After the war, Uekusa reunited with Kurosawa to write the screenplay for the film One Wonderful Sunday (1947), a story about a young couple who go on a date in the bombed-out city of Tokyo. Although writing together led to no issues between them, they had a disagreement about the role of music in the film's climax. After the release of the film, he and Kurosawa reunited with their old teacher Mr. Tachikawa after he sent them a postcard praising their achievement.

Uekusa and Kurosawa also collaborated on their next film, Drunken Angel (1948). They met with difficulty in realising the character of the doctor. However, Uekusa regularly met with a member of the yakuza in order to provide a model for the film's protagonist. While giving the character an authenticity, according to Kurosawa, this led to him becoming sympathetic to the criminal underworld such that the two of them fought about it. After having had some difficulty to conceptualise the film, the two of them simultaneously remembered an eccentric doctor running an unlicensed practice, and they finished writing the film in nearly one sitting. After the film, the two stopped collaborating but remained good friends.

After Drunken Angel, Uekusa wrote a number of stage plays, occasionally returning to write films.

== Filmography ==
Table featuring completed feature films written by Keinosuke Uekusa
Year	Title	Credited as			Notes	Ref.
Year	Title	Director	Writer	Producer	Notes	Ref.
1947	Once More	No	Yes	No		
1947	One Wonderful Sunday	No	Yes	No	Co-written with Akira Kurosawa.	
1948	Drunken Angel	No	Yes	No	Co-written with Akira Kurosawa.	
1951	Weeping Doll	No	Yes	No	Co-written with Juntaro Hozumi.	
1958	The Outsiders	No	Yes	No		
1960	Alakazam the Great	No	Yes	No	Based on Journey to the West, adapted from Osamu Tezuka's manga Boku no Son Goku.	
