= Educational reform in occupied Japan =

Educational reform in occupied Japan (August 1945 – April 1952) encompassed changes in philosophy and goals of education; the nature of the student-teacher relationship; coeducation; the structure of the compulsory education system; textbook content and the procurement system; personnel at the Ministry of Education (MEXT); kanji script reform; and establishment of a university in every prefecture. The reforms were directed by the Education Division (Joseph C. Trainor) of the Civil Information and Education Section (CIE; Kermit R. Dyke, followed by Donald M. Nugent) of the Supreme Commander for the Allied Powers (SCAP, in Japanese: "GHQ"). Also influential were the two reports of the United States Education Mission to Japan (March 1946; September 1950).

== Background ==
During World War II, many Japanese students were mobilized for the war effort, practicing military drills and working in factories, while schools became factory-like production centers. Bombings destroyed some schools, and others were used as refuge centers. After Japan's defeat, the occupation forces (SCAP) undertook the task of reconstruction.

SCAP philosophy regarded a reformed educational system as vital for Japan to become a democratic nation. Traditional Japanese methods were nearly opposite to those of the United States - control of schools was highly centralized and rote memorization of textbooks without much interaction described the standard student-teacher relationship. Also, the study texts were generally described as boring.

Over the period of occupation, these and many other systems were changed. A less centralized hierarchy of school administrators was introduced and parents were allowed to vote for school boards for the first time. A new textbook industry was also created.. The division of school years was changed to resemble that of the United States which, at the time consisted of 6 years of Primary education (elementary schools), 3 years of Lower Secondary education (junior high schools), 3 years of Upper Secondary education (senior high schools), and 4 years of Higher Education (Universities or colleges).

Much of the reform was focused on conditioning students to more readily accept democratic, liberal and egalitarian ideals, directly competing with the previously prevailing hierarchical structures deeply ingrained in every level of Japanese society, from family life to government institutions. Classes became co-educational, with a single track system composed of 9 compulsory years - moving away from the former 6-year, single-sex, multi-track system. The use of kanji script was overhauled and greatly simplified, eliminating all but the 1,850 more commonly used characters, referred to as the tōyō kanjihyō.

Initially, before the Japanese Ministry of Education (MEXT) and Allied command's Civil Information and Education Section (CI&E) produced new textbooks to replace them, narratives in existing Japanese textbooks extolling feudalistic, nationalistic, militaristic, authoritarian, State Shinto-religious, or anti-American views were censored. This was done during class by students through a process of suminuri-kyōkasho, or "blackening-over textbooks" - crossing out blocks of text with ink, under orders of the Supreme Commander for the Allied Powers (SCAP).

== Reform Philosophy ==
The Civil Information and Education Division (CIE) under SCAP followed seven principles for implementing education reforms in occupied Japan. The CIE's objective was to eliminate practices that contradicted the tenets of democracy and employ democratic models. Some of the CIE's main reforms include the 6-3-3-4 school ladder, core curriculum, the program of tests and policies, graduation requirements, collaborative style of learning, and a new course in social studies.

The primary strategy was to establish standards of education common among democratic societies. CIE was aware that patterns built from these theories were implemented differently depending on circumstances. Principles were general, but their local expression was unique. Eventually, these standards became benchmarks for the CIE to ascertain genuine progress in education reforms.

The position of the reformers was that militarism and ultra-nationalism (promoting Japanese cultural unity) must not be a segment of school curriculum. The Division removed the military from academic institutions. Decision-making was left to the civilian population, although under direct American guidance at first. The Americans decentralized administration and authority. At the same time, equality was practiced in education, and discrimination was eliminated. The basis of education must be facts and the experimental method applied whenever necessary. Last but not least it was decided that teaching must be regarded as a profession that requires special training programs. These principles were published in three documents during the early part of the occupation: The Civil Affairs Handbook (1944), Education in Japan (1946), and Report of the United States Mission to Japan (1946).

Efforts to develop a comprehensive program of a democratic educational platform had to be deferred until after The USA Education Mission to Japan headed by George D. Stoddard concluded its visit in March 1946. This delegation included 26 education experts sent by the government upon the request of occupation leaders. A Japanese team worked hand in hand with the American group.

=== Adopting mixed-sex education ===
Under the rule of occupation by the Supreme Commander for the Allied Powers after World War II and the reformed School Education Act of Japan, former secondary schools were converted into Upper secondary schools, established as part of the democratization policy. At that time many public schools with single-sex education were made into mixed-sex education with exception of some schools in Miyagi prefecture, Fukushima prefecture, Gumma prefecture, and Saitama prefecture.

Rare cases occurred such as in Yamaguchi Prefecture, where former high schools were integrated with nearby former secondary schools and transformed into upper secondary schools under a new school system. Osaka Prefecture converted upper secondary schools under its administration into the new system; however, instead of integrating with neighboring junior/upper secondary schools, they replaced the whole population of students and teachers in school A with those who had belonged to school B.

=== Amami Islands ===
The Amami Islands left Japanese administrative power in 1946 (Showa 21), and the Provisional Government of Northern Ryukyu Islands (ja) introduced their new school system in 1949, delayed by one year.

== Transition from the former to the new school system ==
Various transitional measures were taken to alleviate the turmoil caused by the major changes in the school system due to academic reform. A transitional system was applied between 1947 (Showa 22) and 1950 (Showa 25), when schools consolidated under the former and the new systems coexisted. There were cases that fifth-graders in the former secondary school of 1947 (Showa 22) were given the choice whether to graduate with a diploma of the former secondary school, or to transfer to the senior year in the secondary education in Japan, for one additional year of schooling before graduation.

=== Transition measures for the former primary and secondary education (1946–1950) ===
Public schools

Up to March 1946, compulsory education in the secondary level was offered up to the senior level at public National schools in Japan kokumin gakko kotoka (国民学校高等科), a level providing lower secondary education equivalent to Senior elementary school called Kōtō-shōgakkō (高等小学校). Graduates were admitted to those surviving Middle schools (ja) or chuto gakko (中等学校) under former system. All those who graduated from elementary schools after March 1947 (Showa 22) were admitted to the current Junior high schools in Japan, or chugakko (中学校) for their lower secondary education. Starting in 1935, in some public primary schools, continued education for working youth was offered along with military drills at Youth Schools (in Japanese) or Seinen gakko (青年学校)(ja).

In August 1945, there were three sub-systems to middle schools; for boys kyusei chugakko (旧制中学校), for girls koto jogakko (高等女学校), and for both sexes vocational school jitsugyo gakko (実業学校). It was in April 1947 (Showa 22) a measure was taken to provide interim attached middle school (併設中学校, heisetsu chugakko) to each faculty of public middle school: although new students admitted in April 1947 were admitted to the current junior high schools at once, those entered middle school level in 1945 and 1946 (sophomore and senior students) were advanced to the attached middle schools as a transition phase to secondary higher education.

Private schools

The private middle schools were given choice of whether they will change to new school system at once, or to apply transitional system. There were cases that private schools decided to continue the attached middle school after 1950, and they offered continued six-year period of secondary education.

University of Tokyo Junior High School

During WWII, they suspended recruiting students for the former high school regular course (旧制高校尋常科), and in 1946 (Showa 21) very few public secondary schools admitted students as Tokyo koto gakko (東京高等学校) (ja) did, but none in 1947. The freshmen of 1946 became isolated as no new students followed them under former school regulation, and in their senior year in 1948 (Showa 23), the school was reformed into the University of Tokyo Junior High School, recruited new freshmen and sophomores to fill the classrooms. It is reformed later to become the current Secondary School of the Faculty of Education, the University of Tokyo affiliated to the University of Tokyo.

- 1946 (Showa 21)

- A 6th grader in shotoka, kokumin gakko (in Japanese) would enter a reformed junior high in 1947, then graduate and would enter an upper secondary in 1950;
- A 1st grader in Kotoka, kokumin gakko (in Japanese) would transfer to a 2nd grade in a reformed junior high in 1947, then graduate and would enter an upper secondary in 1949;
- A 1st grader at Youth school: in Futsuka (in Japanese) Regular course would transfer to a 2nd grade in a reformed junior high in 1947, then graduate and would enter an upper secondary in 1949;

Education reform in Japan (1946–1950) Transition measures from pre-1945
School calendar of:	1946 Showa 21	1947 Showa 22	1948 Showa 23	1949 Showa 24	1950 Showa 25	1951 Showa 26	1952 Showa 27
Reformed school system	Elementary | Junior high	Upper secondary was started	Colleges and universities were built.				
	Transition period to new school system						
	Pre-1946 Junior high schools 中等学校 (former system) were placed under pre-1946 high schools in 1948, then terminated by the end of 1950 school calendar.						
		Interim junior high schools were introduced in 1947, integrated into reformed upper secondary schools in 19xx, to be terminated by the end of 1949 school calendar.					
	Former School System was terminated in 1949.				Last Middle School 中等学校 (former system) was terminated by the end of 1950 school calendar.	New School System started officially.	
Category and transition, primary and secondary education
School calendar of:	1946 Showa 21	1947 Showa 22	1948 Showa 23	1949 Showa 24	1950 Showa 25	1951 Showa 26	1952 Showa 27
National schools or Kokumin gakko, (in Japanese)	1st grade, shotoka (in Japanese); 7yrs old. Start of compulsory education	2nd to 6th grades, elementary school (new)	Elementary school				Junior high school
National schools or Kokumin gakko, (in Japanese)	2nd grade, 8yrs old.	2nd to 6th grades, elementary school (new)	Elementary school			Junior high school	
National schools or Kokumin gakko, (in Japanese)	3rd grade 9yrs old.	2nd to 6th grades, elementary school (new)	Elementary school		Junior high school		
National schools or Kokumin gakko, (in Japanese)	4th grade 10yrs old.	2nd to 6th grades, elementary school (new)	Elementary school	Junior high school			
National schools or Kokumin gakko, (in Japanese)	5th grade 11 yrs old	2nd to 6th grades, elementary school (new)	Junior high school				
National schools or Kokumin gakko, (in Japanese)	6th grade, shotoka (in Japanese); 12yrs (grad 13yrs)	1st to 3rd grade, interim junior high. Compulsory education extended to junior high.					
National schools or Kokumin gakko, (in Japanese)	6th grade, shotoka (in Japanese); 12yrs (grad 13yrs)	1st grader, Youth School	merged into junior high school (新制中学校) under new system.				
National schools or Kokumin gakko, (in Japanese)	Tokushu-ka (supplementary course)	Admitted to 3rd grade, interim junior high					
Youth school (青年学校, Seinen gakko) (in Japanese)	1st grade, futsuka (in Japanese)	Students and teachers transferred to new Junior High Schools. In old system, Futsuka students would have finished courses in the 2nd grade.					
Youth school (青年学校, Seinen gakko) (in Japanese)	2nd grade, futsuka,	3rd grade, interim junior high	1st to 3rd grade, upper secondary (new)			transferred to reformed colleges and universities	
Youth school (青年学校, Seinen gakko) (in Japanese)	1st grader, Honka (in Japanese)	2st grade, Honka (in Japanese)	Students and teachers transferred to new upper secondary education as new part-time courses for vocational education. In old system, Honka students would have finished courses in the 5th grade.				
Middle school (中等教育学校, Chuto gakko/Chuto kyoiku gakko) 中等学校 (former system) (in Japanese)	1st grader	2nd and 3rd grade, lower secondary education (新制中学校, shinsei chugakko) (new)	Transformed to upper secondary schools in 1948. The last school was closed in March 1950 due to document arrangements for over year students applying to colleges and universities.				
Middle school (中等教育学校, Chuto gakko/Chuto kyoiku gakko) 中等学校 (former system) (in Japanese)	1st grader	2nd and 3rd grade, interim junior high		Transformed to upper secondary schools in 1948. The last school was closed in March 1950 due to document arrangements for over year students applying to colleges and universities.			
Girls' high schools (高等女学校, Koto jogakko) (in Japanese)	1st grader	Transferred to 2nd grade, but no new 1st graders were admitted.	Schools decided to adopt new education system. However, basically, continued education for six years of secondary education even if they issue graduation diploma at the end of 3rd grade junior high school, or the lower upper education.				
Girls' high schools (高等女学校, Koto jogakko) (in Japanese)	1st grader	Transferred to 2nd grade under new system. New 1st graders were admitted.	Schools decided to adopt new education system. However, basically, continued education for six years of secondary education even if they issue graduation diploma at the end of 3rd grade junior high school, or the lower upper education.				
Business schools (実業学校, Jitsugyo gakko) 実業学校 (in Japanese)	1st grade (Note: 1946 (Showa 21) - 5 years were required to qualify for diploma. Politecnic schools for boys were converted back to Men's commercial schools. See also jawp jitsugyo gakko.)	No students admitted in 1947. Interim junior high introduced and attached to jitsugyo gakko.	Admitted as 1st grade, upper secondary education (新制高校).	2nd and 3rd grades, upper secondary education (新制高校).			
Business schools (実業学校, Jitsugyo gakko) 実業学校 (in Japanese)	1st grade	Transferred 2nd and 3rd grades to 2nd and 3rd grades in junior high (new).	Admitted as 1st grade, upper secondary education (新制高校).	2nd and 3rd grades, upper secondary education (新制高校).			
Business schools (実業学校, Jitsugyo gakko) 実業学校 (in Japanese)	2nd grade	graduated	Nominated and enrolled as over-year 1st grade, upper secondary education (新制高校).	2nd and 3rd grades, upper secondary education (新制高校).			
Transformation of middle schools
School calendar of:	1946 Showa 21	1947 Showa 22	1948 Showa 23	1949 Showa 24	1950 Showa 25	1951 Showa 26	1952 Showa 27
Middle school (中等学校, Chuto gakko) (in Japanese)	1st grader	2nd and 3rd grades, lower secondary education (新制中学校, shinsei chugakko) (new)					
Middle school (中等学校, Chuto gakko) (in Japanese)	1st grader	2nd and 3rd grades, interim junior high					
Middle school (中等学校, Chuto gakko) (in Japanese)	2nd grader	3rd grade, interim junior high	1st and 2nd grades, upper secondary (new)		senior, upper secondary (new system)	transferred to reformed colleges or universities	
Middle school (中等学校, Chuto gakko) (in Japanese)	2nd grader	3rd, 4th and 5th grades, interim junior high 中等学校 (Note: Cases were exceptional among public schools, however, for private sector, the transition from pre-1946 system was adopted but as a matter of fact, there were special cases when a new 1st grade students in the upper secondary education needs to apply for entrance examination among other graduates from other junior high schools, after finishing the 3rd grade in the lower secondary form.)			senior, upper secondary (new system)		
Middle school (中等学校, Chuto gakko) (in Japanese)	3rd grade	4th grade	2nd grade, upper secondary (new)	transferred to 2nd grade, upper secondary (new)	transferred to reformed colleges or universities		
Middle school (中等学校, Chuto gakko) (in Japanese)	4th grade	transferred to 1st grade, Kyusei koko (former system) (in Japanese)	3rd grade, upper secondary (new)	transferred to reformed colleges or universities			
Middle school (中等学校, Chuto gakko) (in Japanese)	5th grade	transferred to either reformed colleges or universities, preparatory/vocational/normal schools.					

=== Higher education : 1948–1950, converting to modern universities ===
Under the system former to reformation, the last students were admitted in spring of 1948; Kyusei kotogakko was introduced in 1894 and expired in 1950 after the reformation in 1918, Kyusei semmongakko (旧制専門学校) in 1903 as a single major normal school specializing in elementary school education was called Shihangakko (師範学校) with Koto shihangakko (高等師範学校) for training educators for high schools and college level.

Daigaku yoka (大学予科) along with Kyusei kotogakko had been established as the primary higher education for those who would continue to universities. For Kyusei kotogakko, the senior year graduates, or the 3rd graders who commenced from kotogakko in 1947 were the last generation finishing the full three years' term of high school education. Those freshmen entered in 1948 completed their first year under the former system, and as it expired at the end of the academic year 1948 or March 1949, they did not qualify to transfer for their choice of colleges under a new system, or shinsei daigaku (新制大学). They applied for admission examination and entered colleges and universities in the spring of 1949.

The idea of 1949 educational system reform was to reform so-called high schools under the old system as colleges and universities. As shinsei daigaku or universities under a new system, those high schools under the old system including single major semmon gakko and shihangakko for future educators were renamed.

For students, those who had studied for the full four years' term and qualify as kyusei chugakko (旧制中学校) graduates in 1947 were offered two options. They either could enter kyuseikoko and transfer, or enter shinsei koko, the present day high school and continue to prepare for college or university. As for special transition measure, those 3rd graders in old high schools were also given those two options. Like on the Komaba campus of University of Tokyo, there were rivalry seen among those high school students of Daiichi Kotogakko against the university students. While the last kyusei daigaku, or old system universities admitted students till 1950, there were considerable number of graduates of old system high schools who either failed at the admission examinations or postponed their applications. Universities established administered by the new system held special examinations for those graduates of past academic years as transfer students.

==== Medical schools ====
In 1949 (Showa 24), under the academic system reform, the qualification for admission to the medical and dental departments became "a person who has completed two years of college and who meets specific requirements (in defined subjects and credits)". Therefore, a single department (medical/dental) schools and nursing schools transformed and adapted those Preparatory colleges (大学予科, Daigaku yoka) under Japanese University Act of 1918 as two years' undergraduate course after the academic reformation. The four-year university which had established the “Science Department” made a two-years' preparatory courses, called Rigakubu otsu (理学部乙), or the “Preparatory Course, Science Department”, especially for medical and dental students: requirements of two-year university graduates were hence cleared. preparatory two-years colleges Fr:Loi sur l'université The anomalous state of mixed students with academic achievement under the new and old systems lasted by 1955, when the new regulation for department of medical and dental studies went into effect, and surviving preparatory courses as well as those university preparatory courses was merged into Faculty of Science. Nursing school reform followed the course as well.

== See also ==
- Education in Japan
- History of education in Japan
- Sadao Araki
- Occupation of Japan by the Supreme Commander for the Allied Powers (SCAP)

== Bibliography ==
- Divine, Charles Peter (1978). Educational reforms in occupied Japan. Madison, WI: University of Wisconsin.
- Kenneth B. Pyle. The Making of Modern Japan, 1996.
- Yamanaka, Hisashi (1986-11-20). Kodomotachi no taiheiyō sensō [Children at National Schools and the Age of the Pacific War]. Iwanami Shinsho (ki 356) (in Japanese). Tokyo: Iwanami Shoten. ISBN 4-00-420356-2.
- "Gakusei hyakunen-shi : Kokumin gakko no seiritsu" [A Century of Schooling : Formation of national schools]. White Papers> Centennial History> §5 Education under Wars (in Japanese). Shinjuku, Tokyo: Ministry of Education, Culture, Sports, Science and Technology. September 5, 1981.
