= No Regrets for Our Youth =

- Theatrical release poster
- Directed by: Akira Kurosawa
- Written by: Eijirō Hisaita; Akira Kurosawa; Keiji Matsuzaki
- Produced by: Keiji Matsuzaki
- Starring: Setsuko Hara; Susumu Fujita; Denjirō Ōkōchi
- Cinematography: Asakazu Nakai
- Edited by: Toshio Goto
- Music by: Tadashi Hattori
- Production company: Toho
- Distributed by: Toho
- Release date: October 29, 1946
- Running time: 110 minutes
- Country: Japan
- Language: Japanese

No Regrets for Our Youth (Japanese: わが青春に悔なし, Hepburn: Waga Seishun ni Kuinashi) is a 1946 Japanese film written and directed by Akira Kurosawa. It is based on the 1933 Takigawa incident, and is considered a quintessential "democratization film", taking up many themes associated with social policy under the early Occupation of Japan.

The film stars Setsuko Hara, Susumu Fujita, Takashi Shimura and Denjirō Ōkōchi. Fujita's character was inspired by the real-life Hotsumi Ozaki, who assisted the famous Soviet spy Richard Sorge and became the only Japanese citizen to suffer the death penalty for treason during World War II. The film is in black-and-white and runs 110 minutes.

== Plot ==
The film begins in 1933. Students at Kyoto Imperial University protest the Japanese invasion of Manchuria. Prominent professor Yagihara (Denjiro Okochi) is relieved of his post because of his views against fascism. The professor's daughter Yukie (Setsuko Hara) is courted by two of her father's students: Ryukichi Noge (Susumu Fujita) and Itokawa (Akitake Kôno). Itokawa is equable and moderate while Noge is fiery and a radical leftist. Although she fights with him vigorously, Yukie is eventually drawn toward Noge.

Noge disappears following an anti-militarist student protest, the result of being arrested and spending four years in jail. By the time Itokawa, now a prosecutor for the government, tells Yukie of Noge's whereabouts, he has been out of jail for a year. He warns her that he is a changed man and no longer how Yukie remembered him.

Itokawa brings Noge over to the Yagihara residence. During dinner, Professor Yagihara mentions that Noge would not have been released unless the government was convinced that Noge had "converted" from his radical ways. Noge confirms this and says that Itokawa vouched for him and had even found him a job in the army.

After realizing that Noge has changed from his days at university, Yukie excuses herself from the dinner table and locks herself in her room. Her mother eventually tells her that the young men are leaving. Yukie is reluctant to see them out, but once her mother tells her that Noge is leaving for China she decides to see Noge one last time to say goodbye.

After Noge's departure, Yukie begins to pack for Tokyo and has a deep conversation with her father. For three years in Tokyo, Yukie works in menial jobs to get by. One day she runs into Itokawa and is told that Noge is in the city. She goes to Noge's offices, but is reluctant to reconnect. Yukie is shown outside of the offices several times until eventually Noge notices her. They spend several years together and get married.

Yukie discovers that Noge is involved in dangerous and illegal activities, but they agree that she should not know exactly what they are. Noge is arrested the night before his plans are to go into effect. Yukie is interrogated, but she proffers no information. She is treated badly during the interrogations but Itokawa is eventually able to free her.

Her parents take the train to Tokyo where Yukie's father meets up with Itokawa, thanks him for what he has done and informs him that he intends to represent Noge in court. Itokawa mournfully responds that Noge died the night before. Yukie is crushed. She brings his ashes to his parents, farmers in the countryside, and tells them she is his wife. Noge's father rejects her, believing that she has come to mock them because their son was convicted of being a spy but Yukie stays and works the rice fields with them. They are scorned and harassed in their village, and Yukie tries to convince them of her sincerity and that their son was a good man. The work in the rice fields is hard on her, but she is determined to prove her mettle, even to the point of working through a severe fever.

The night that Yukie and her mother-in-law finally finish planting all of the fields, the neighbors sneak in and destroy their work. When Yukie mourns the vandalism, Noge's father finally accepts her and his son is redeemed in his eyes. At the end of the war, Professor Yagihara is reinstated and Noge is honored for his anti-war efforts. Yukie returns to Kyoto to visit her parents. Yukie's mother invites her to stay since it seems her daughter has achieved her goal: Noge's parents are no longer ashamed of their son. However, Yukie now feels more comfortable planting rice than playing the piano and sees the value in the social work that still must be done in the village (obliquely referencing occupation-era reforms like land reform and women's enfranchisement), so she returns to Noge's parents.

== Cast ==
- Setsuko Hara as Yukie Yagihara
- Susumu Fujita as Ryukichi Noge
- Denjirō Ōkōchi as Professor Yagihara
- Haruko Sugimura as Madame Noge
- Eiko Miyoshi as Madame Yagihara
- Kokuten Kōdō as Mr. Noge
- Akitake Kōno as Itokawa
- Takashi Shimura Police Commissioner Dokui
- Taizō Fukami as Minister of Education
- Masao Shimizu as Professor Hakozaki
- Haruo Tanaka as Student
- Kazu Hikari as Detective
- Hisako Hara as Itokawa's mother
- Shin Takemura as Prosecutor
- Chieko Nakakita as Lady
- Fusako Fujima as Old Woman

== Background ==
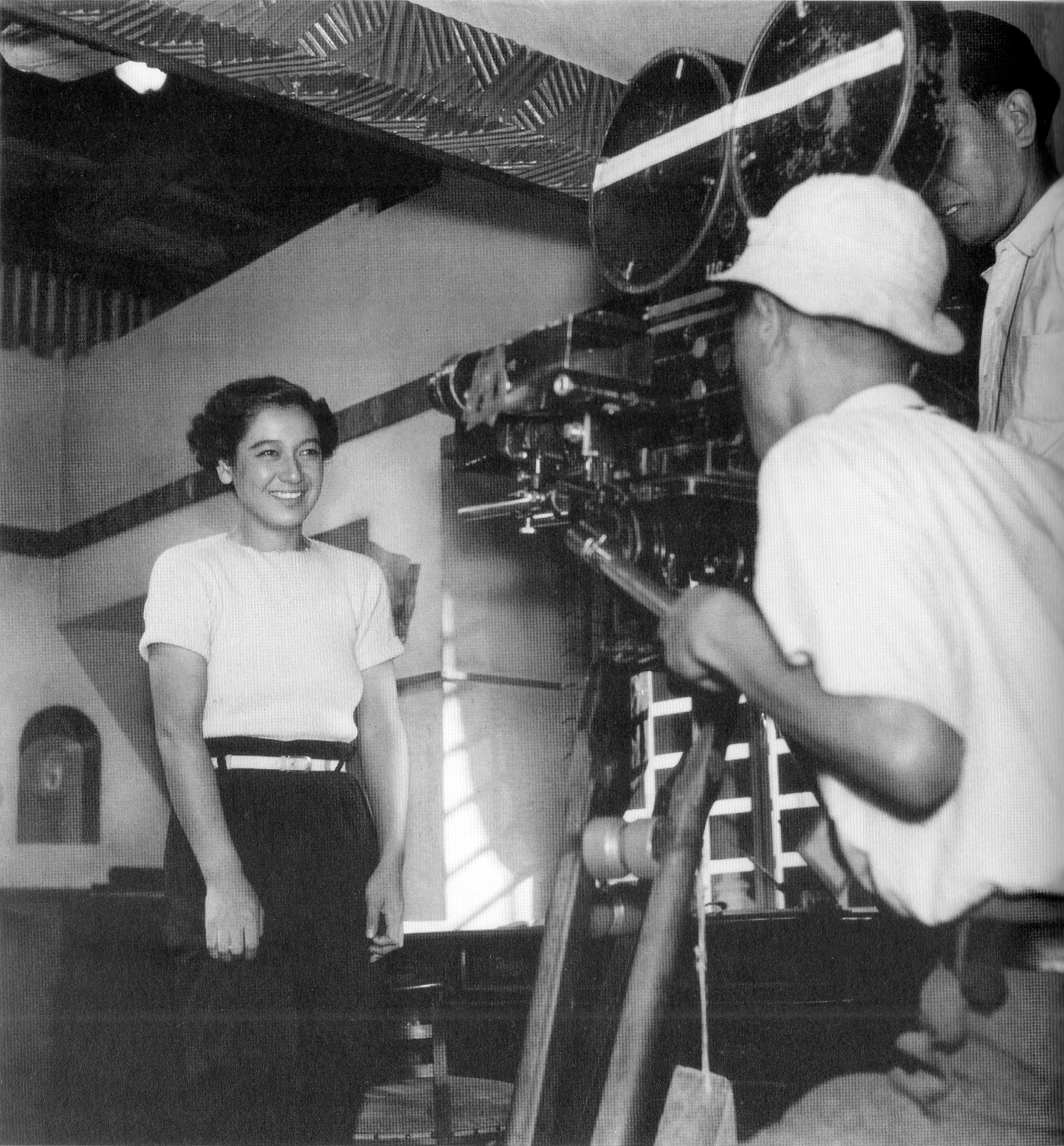
Setsuko Hara being filmed by Asakazu Nakai and Akira Kurosawa on set.

After the surrender of Japan, the newly established Civil Information and Education Division set guidelines for the making of "democratization films", encouraging topics including the emancipation of women, civil rights, and the condemnation of militarists and war profiteers. Producer and co-writer Keiji Matsuzaki had been a student of Professor Takigawa at Kyoto University and wanted to produce a film based on the Takigawa incident. Matsuzaki worked on the storyline with Eijiro Hisaita and Akira Kurosawa, then travelled to Kyoto in December 1945 to interview the people involved in the incident. The opening titles of the film, giving the background of the incident, originally mentioned the responsibility of Ichirō Hatoyama, former Minister of Education. Kurosawa later explained "the Toho company told me to delete [Hatoyama’s name] because it would have been upsetting".

The completed film was markedly different from the Hisaita's original script, which Kurosawa considered superior. The production administration committee of the Toho labor union considered the script too similar to a script by newcomer Kiyoshi Kusuda, also based on the case of Hotsumi Ozaki. Kurosawa was forced to rewrite to latter half of the film, and was indignant when the committee recanted after the film was finished. The film was released on October 29, 1946, when the labor union was on strike, and management made the decision to release the film in Nikkatsu theatres, over the protests of the filmmakers.

== Reception ==
No Regrets for Our Youth was received enthusiastically by post-war audiences and was ranked as the second best film of 1946 by Kinema Junpo. David Conde of the Civil Information and Education Section considered the film the best among those he had been involved in. However, many critics considered the character of Yukie to be too eccentric, exaggerated and inhuman.

In The Films of Akira Kurosawa, Donald Richie lists No Regrets for Our Youth as the first of Kurosawa's films that he considers "perfect", and argues that Japanese critics resented the film's uncompromising individualist message. In addition, Richie argues that the depiction of both the military and peasants as antagonists is evidence for Kurosawa's "political uninvolvement" with both the right-wing and left-wing. Mitsuhiro Yoshimoto rejects Richie's characterization of the film as apolitical in light of the involvement of the Civil Information and Education Section in film production, Hisaita and Matsuzaki's prewar involvement in the proletarian art movement, and Matsuzaki's personal interest in the Takigawa incident.

Nagisa Ōshima was profoundly affected by No Regrets for Our Youth as a teenager, but later criticized the film for transforming the historical figures of Ozaki, a communist, and Takigawa, who opposed post-war student movements, into staunch defenders of liberalism, and for its false depiction of united resistance during the Kyoto University incident, which in reality was "a history of schisms, submissions, and conversions after conversions". Ōshima argues that the film ultimately absolves the Japanese people of their responsibility for wartime militarism.

== Reissues ==
The Criterion Collection has released No Regrets for Our Youth on DVD in North America as part of two Kurosawa-centered box sets; 2008's Postwar Kurosawa, the seventh entry in their Eclipse series, and 2009's AK 100: 25 Films by Akira Kurosawa.

== See also ==
- Japanese resistance during the Shōwa period
