= Takigawa incident =

1932 Japanese academic controversy

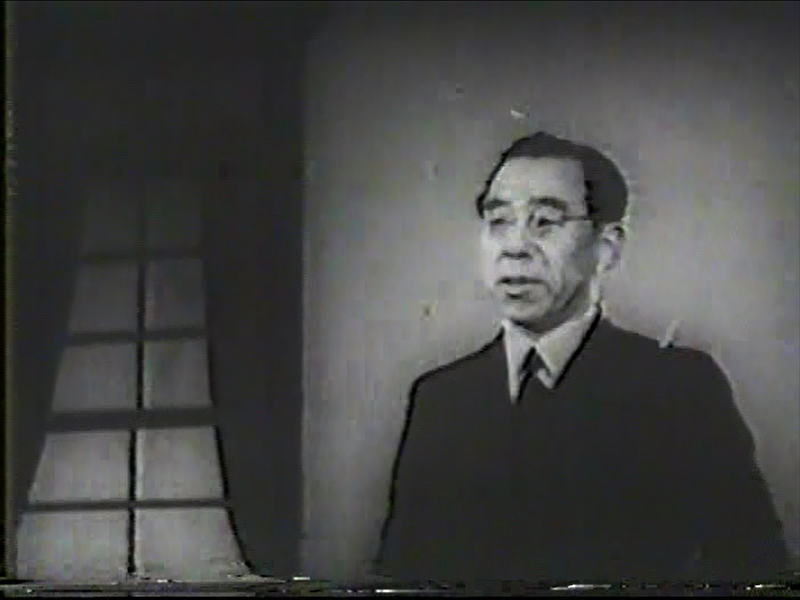

The Takigawa incident (滝川事件, Takigawa Jiken), or Kyoto University incident (京大事件, Kyōdai Jiken), began in October 1932 when Kyoto Imperial University Faculty of Law Professor Takigawa Yukitoki lectured on the need for the judiciary to understand the social roots of deviance when considering individuals who are before them. The climactic moment occurred in May 1933, when Education Minister Hatoyama Ichiro announced that Dr. Takigawa's theory of criminal law advocated Marxist philosophies and suspended him from teaching. This showed the state's widespread use of the Peace Preservation Law outlawing perceived subversion, as Yukitoki was a liberal, not a communist. The remaining members of the Faculty of Law resigned from their positions in protest, students boycotted classes, and sympathisers organised a protest movement. The Ministry of Education suppressed the movement by firing Takigawa.

== See also ==
- No Regrets for Our Youth (1946 film)
- Japanese resistance during the Shōwa period
