= David Conde =

Japan-based journalist and film censor

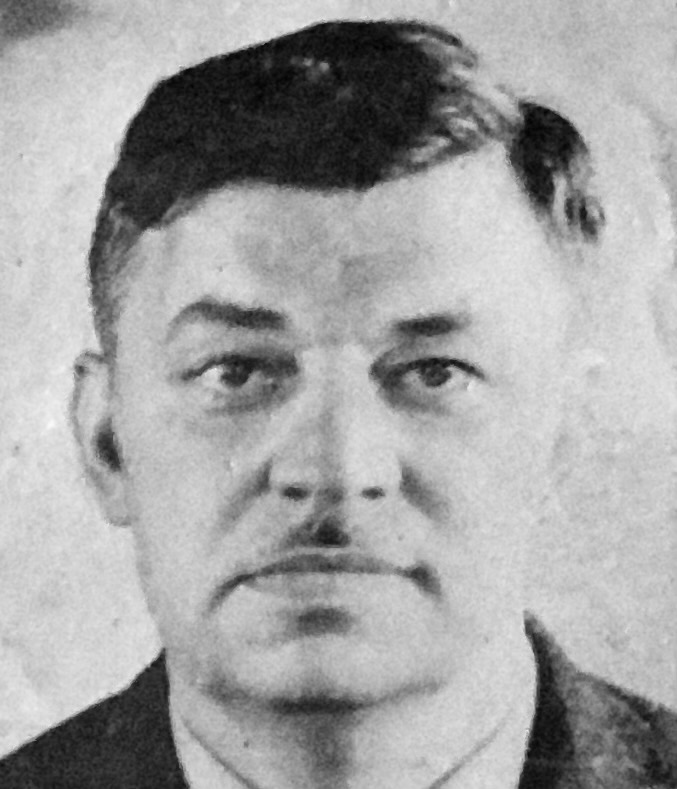
- Born: William David Wellwood Conde; July 19, 1906; Listowel, Ontario, Canada
- Died: April 1981 (aged 74); Oakland, California, U.S.
- Occupations: Journalist, film censor, writer

William David Wellwood Conde (July 18, 1906 – April 1981), usually known as David Conde or Wellwood Conde, was a Canadian-born American author, journalist, and film censor who worked in occupied Japan and wrote about Japanese politics and culture.

== Early life ==
Conde was born in Listowel, Ontario, the son of Melville Alexander Conde and Mary Hewitt Conde. He confessed to theft and receiving stolen property in his teens. He became a naturalized American citizen in 1932.

== Career ==
From October 1945 to July 1946, Conde served as the director of the Motion Picture Department of the Civil Information and Education Section (CIE) in the occupation government of Japan. Conde was known to be left-leaning and a union supporter, and has been linked to the Toho labor disputes at Toho Studios. During his time heading CIE's Motion Picture Department, Conde was tasked with promoting democratic and anti-militaristic films.

From 1946 to 1947 Conde reported on the Tokyo War Crimes Trial as a Reuters journalist. In 1947, he was forced by MacArthur's government to return to the United States. His expulsion from Japan in 1947 may have been related to suspicions that he was a communist. He later worked as a foreign correspondent in Tokyo, and wrote several books about Asian and American politics. He also wrote fiction, and reviewed books for the San Francisco Examiner.

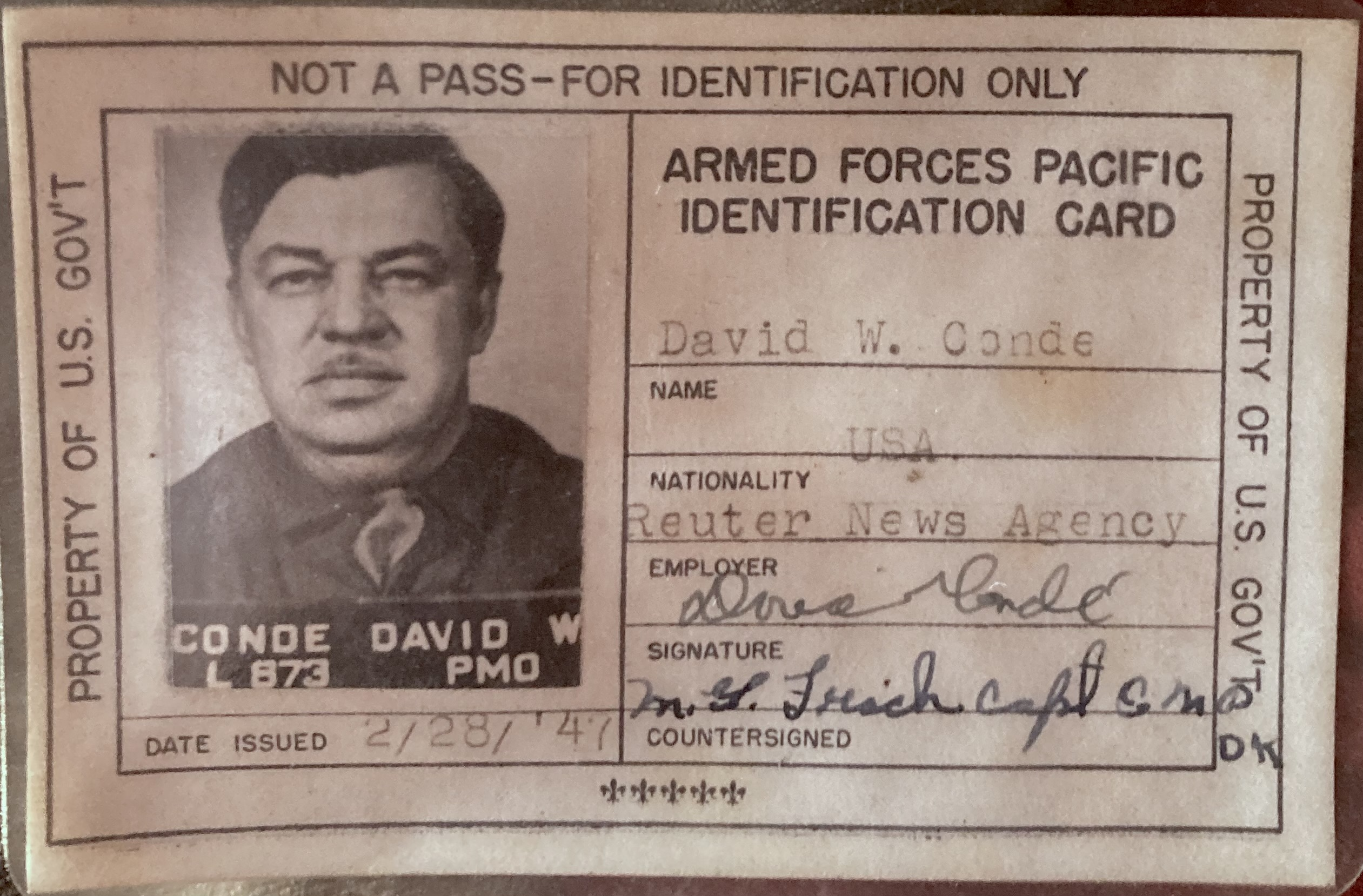

== Publications ==
- "Japan's Outward Calm Hides Many Unsolved Ills" (1946)
- "The Korean Minority in Japan" (1947)
- "Japan is Raking Up Its Militarist Past" (1973)
- "Japan Reviving Tunes of Glory" (1973)

== Personal life and legacy ==
Conde married twice. He married Helene Gates in 1930. They had two daughters, and divorced by 1950. He remarried to Marian Hope Scheifele in 1958. He died in Oakland, California, in 1981, at the age of 74. Many of his papers and effects are held by the University of British Columbia.
