= William Woodard =

American academic

William Parsons Woodard (September 10, 1896 – February 20, 1973), was born in Kalamazoo, Michigan. He was a scholar of Japanese religion, and served as an advisor on religion and cultural resources during the allied command after World War II.

== Personal life ==
In 1918 Woodard graduated from Kalamazoo College with a history degree. He spent a short period of military service as a sergeant during World War I. Woodard married Harriet Mead in May 1920 and graduated from Union Theological Seminary in 1921.

Harriet died in Tokyo, October 9, 1956. Later that year, Woodard married Margaret (Peggy) Cuddeback, a missionary and YWCA secretary.

Woodard died February 20, 1973, in Pomona, California.

== Career ==
In 1921 he went to Japan as a missionary of the American Board of Commissioners for Foreign Missions (Congregational Christian Churches). He stayed in Japan until 1941. During the later part of his stay he worked as a secretary in the headquarters of the Kumiai Christian Church.

From 1942 to 1947, he served in the U.S. Navy as an intelligence officer, rising to the rank of Lieutenant Commander. He returned to Japan in 1945 after the end of World War II. He remained in Japan working with the military in a variety of roles related to the Religious Juridical Persons Law, until the end of the Allied occupation in 1952, when he returned to the States.

In 1953 he went back to Japan to found the International Institute for the Study of Religions. He served as their director until 1966, when he again returned to the United States.

After returning to the States, Woodard lectured at Claremont Graduate School from 1966 until 1972.

== Research work ==
In Japan, he showed an interest in Japanese religion, co-authoring with Motonori Ono Shinto: The Kami Way. [Tokyo]: Bridgeway Press, 1962.. with over 500 copies in WorldCat libraries.

Woodard's research and study of Japanese religions during the Occupation resulted in his 1957 article "Religion-State Relations in Japan" in Contemporary Japan v.24, 640-676 (1957), which was at the time considered "The only scholarly work which concentrates on the occupation's religious efforts" This was then expanded into his book The Allied Occupation of Japan and Japanese Religions (1972). The book was translated into Japanese as 天皇と神道 : GHQの宗教政策 / Tennō to Shintō : GHQ no shūkyō seisaku.

In 1975, WE Skillend writing in the Bulletin of the School of Oriental and African Affairs said "No student of Japanese religion during the years since the war can fail to acknowledge a debt of gratitude to Mr. Woodard. " A Companion to Japanese History, said in 2007 that "Woodard's 1972 study remains the standard work on Japan's religious reformation ".

== Selected works ==
- Woodard, William Parsons (1972). The Allied Occupation of Japan 1945-1952 and Japanese religions. Brill. ISBN 9789004033528.
- Woodard, William Parsons; Kyokai, Nihon Gaiju (1960). Religious juridical persons law. Foreign Affairs Association of Japan.
- Woodard, William Parsons; Kishimoto, Hideo (1958). Religion and modern life. Kokusai Shūkyō Kenkyū Sho.
- Woodard, William Parsons (1959). The wartime persecution of Nichiren Buddhism. transactions of the Asiatic Society of Japan, 3rd. ser., vol. VII, Tokyo, 1959. Asiatic Society of Japan.
- Woodard, William Parsons (1958). 大学宗教関係講義 (in Japanese). International Institute for the Study of Religions.
- Woodard, William Parsons (1938). "How can We Help Japan?". The Missionary Herald at Home and Abroad. American Board of Commissioners for Foreign Missions, General Council of the Congregational and Christian Churches in the United States. Board of Home Missions, General Council of the Congregational and Christian Churches of the United States. Board of Home Missions. Missionary Herald: 4.
