= Asakazu Nakai =

Japanese cinematographer (1901–1988)

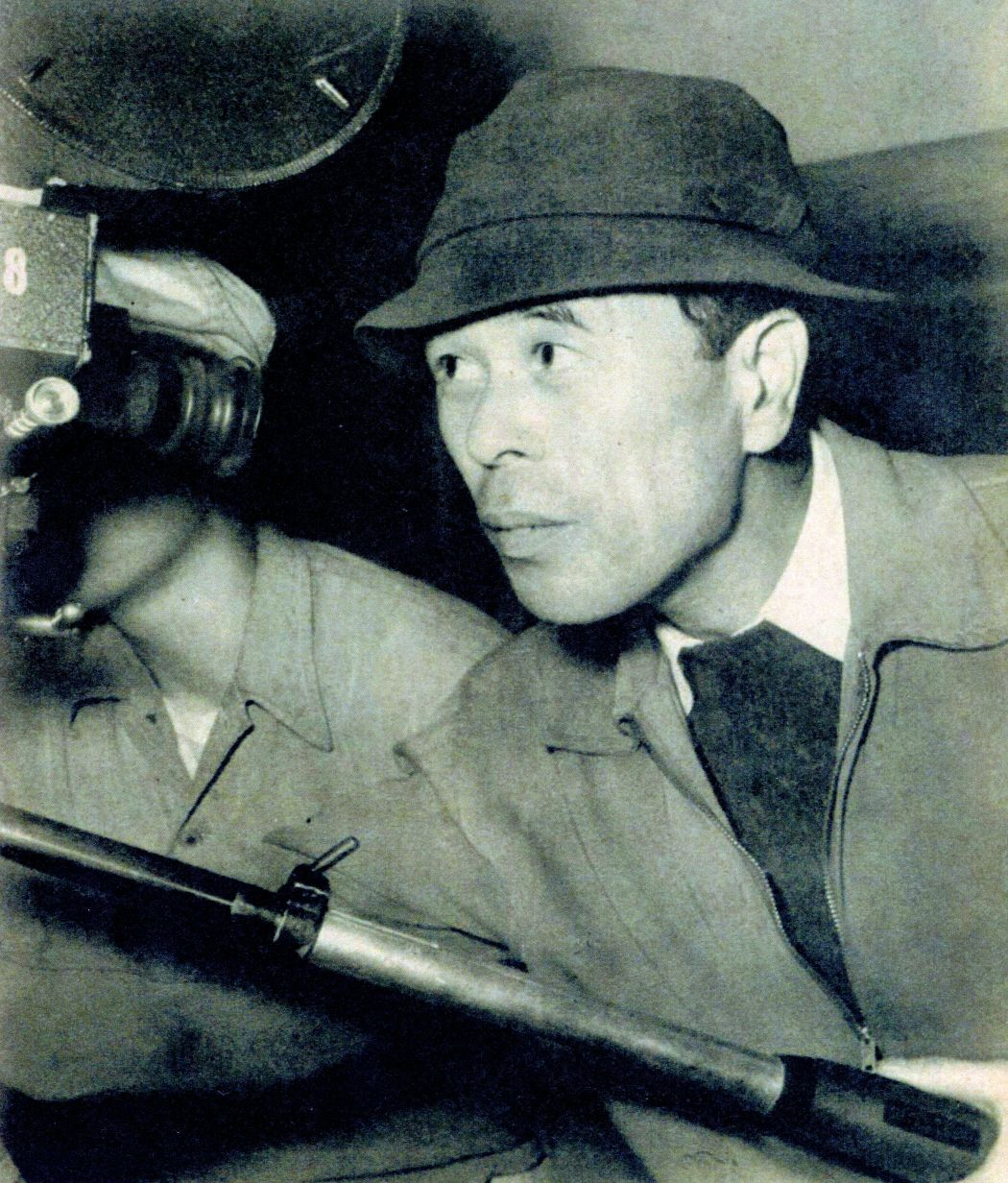
Nakai in 1952

Asakazu Nakai (中井朝一, Nakai Asakazu, 29 August 1901 – 28 February 1988) was a Japanese cinematographer born in Hyōgo Prefecture, best known for his work with Akira Kurosawa. In 1950, he won the Mainichi Film Award for Best Cinematography for Stray Dog. He was nominated for the Academy Award for Best Cinematography for his work on the film Ran (1985), being the oldest nominee ever in that category.

== Selected filmography ==
- 1943: The Song Lantern
- 1946: No Regrets for Our Youth
- 1947: One Wonderful Sunday
- 1949: Stray Dog
- 1952: Ikiru
- 1954: Seven Samurai
- 1955: I Live in Fear
- 1957: Throne of Blood
- 1961: The End of Summer
- 1963: High and Low
- 1965: Red Beard
- 1975: Dersu Uzala
- 1985: Ran
