= Winfield Niblo =

American educator who promoted square dancing

Winfield Puntenney Niblo (August 5, 1912 – March 8, 2007) was an American educator best known for his promotion of traditional square dancing in Japan after World War II.

== Recognition ==
Niblo was awarded the Order of the Sacred Treasure, Gold Rays with Neck Ribbon, in 1982.
