= Fundamental Law of Education =

Japanese education law

The Fundamental Law of Education (教育基本法, kyōiku kihonhō) is a Japanese law which sets the standards for the Japanese education system.

== Summary ==
The Fundamental Law of Education, as the name suggests, is a law concerning the foundation of Japanese education. Because it acts as the basis for the interpretation and application of various laws & ordinances regarding education, it is also known as "The Education Constitution" (教育憲法, kyōiku kenpō) and "The Charter of Education" (教育憲章, kyōiku kenshō). MEXT translations into English entitle it the Basic Act on Education.

The Fundamental Law of Education contains a preamble and 18 Articles. The law sets out the purposes and objectives of education and provides for equal opportunity in education, compulsory education, coeducation, social education, political education, religious education, educational administration, etc. According to the law, the purpose of education is "the full development of personality" (人格の完成, jinkaku no kansei). Article 1 states that the law

shall aim for the full development of personality and strive to nurture the citizens, sound in mind and body, who are imbued with the qualities necessary for those who form a peaceful and democratic state and society.

The current Fundamental law was enacted on December 22, 2006, replacing the previous 11-article Act of March 31, 1947 (the 'old fundamental law of Education').

== Original 1947 enactment ==
The old law was created under the auspices of SCAP, enacted by the 90th session of the Imperial Japanese Diet, which would be the last Imperial Diet conducted under the Imperial Japanese Constitution. It is often said that the old Fundamental Law of Education was written in the spirit of the new Japanese Constitution, representing a radical means of education reform, and replacing the pre-World War II Imperial Rescript on Education, which was based partly on Confucianist thought.

During the debate about constitutional reform, it was argued that provisions regarding education should be included in the national constitution itself. However, the Minister of Education at that time, Kōtarō Tanaka, proposed the creation of a separate law regarding education. The Ministry of Education then created an Educational Reform Committee, which deliberated over the contents of the Fundamental Law. The law was approved by the Imperial Diet as was written in the original draft, without revision.

== Provisions of the Fundamental Law of Education ==
- Preamble

We, the citizens of Japan, desire to further develop the democratic and cultural state we have built through our untiring efforts, and contribute to the peace of the world and the improvement of the welfare of humanity.

To realize these ideals, we shall esteem individual dignity, and endeavor to bring up people who long for truth and justice, honor the public spirit, and are rich in humanity and creativity, while promoting an education which transmits tradition and aims at the creation of a new culture.

We hereby enact this Act, in accordance with the spirit of the Constitution of Japan, in order to establish the foundations of education and promote an education that opens the way to our country’s future.

- Chapter 1 Aims and Principles of Education

- Article 1 Aims of Education

Education shall aim for the full development of personality and strive to nurture the citizens, sound in mind and body, who are imbued with the qualities necessary for those who form a peaceful and democratic state and society.

- Article 2 Objectives of Education

Whilst respect academic freedom, education will aim

（1） to foster an attitude to acquire wide-ranging knowledge and culture, and to seek the truth, cultivate a rich sensibility and sense of morality, while developing a healthy body.

（2） to develop the abilities of individuals while respecting their value; cultivate their creativity; foster a spirit of autonomy and independence; and foster an attitude to value labor while emphasizing the connections with career and practical life.

（3） to foster an attitude to value justice, responsibility, equality between men and women, mutual respect and cooperation, and actively contribute, in the public spirit, to the building and development of society.

（4） to foster an attitude to respect life, care for nature, and contribute to the protection of the environment.

（5） to foster an attitude to respect our traditions and culture, love the country and region that nurtured them (我が国と郷土を愛する), together with respect for other countries and a desire to contribute to world peace and the development of the international community.

- Article 3 Concept of Lifelong Learning
- Article 4 Equal Opportunity in Education

"Citizens shall all be given equal opportunities to receive education according to their abilities, and shall not be subject to discrimination in education on account of race, creed, sex, social status, economic position, or family origin"
People living with disabilities or financial hardship will be supported

- Chapter 2 Basics of Education Provision

- Article 5 Compulsory Education

Citizens have an obligation to educate their children to "cultivate the foundations for an independent life within society".
Compulsory education is free.

- Article 6 School Education

The government regulates the establishment of schools for compulsory education

- Article 7 Universities

Universities exist to seek truth, create knowledge, disseminate knowledge and specialised skills broadly, etc
The intellectual autonomy of universities is ensured.

- Article 8 Private Schools

Government will promote education in private schools

- Article 9 Teachers

（1） Teachers of the schools prescribed by law shall endeavor to fulfill their duties, while being deeply conscious of their noble mission and continuously devoting themselves to research and self-cultivation.

（2） Considering the importance of the mission and duties of the teachers set forth in the preceding paragraph, the status of teachers shall be respected, their fair and appropriate treatment ensured, and measures shall be taken to improve their education and training.

- Article 10 Education in the Family

Parents have the responsibility to teach children basic habits for living, a spirit of independence, and encourage the development of body and mind.
Families will be supported in this by government.

- Article 11 Early Childhood Education

Government will promote early childhood education and maintain standards in those environments.

- Article 12 Social Education

Government will support community education, including "libraries, museums, community halls and other social education facilities, opening the usage of school facilities, providing opportunities to learn, relevant information, and other appropriate means"

- Article 13 Partnership and Cooperation among Schools, Families, and Local Residents

"Schools, families, local residents, and other relevant persons shall be aware of their respective roles and responsibilities regarding education, and endeavor to develop partnership and cooperation"

- Article 14 Political Education

Political literacy and citizenship will be promoted
Schools will refrain from political education and activity.

- Article 15 Religious Education

（1） The attitude of religious tolerance, general knowledge regarding religion, and the position of religion in social life shall be valued in education.

（2） The schools established by the national and local governments shall refrain from religious education or other activities for a specific religion.

- Chapter 3 Education Administration

- Article 16 Education Administration

Government will provide for equal opportunities, raise the standards of education, respond to regional circumstances
Government will work in the spirit of cooperation without improper controls.

- Article 17 Basic Plan for the Promotion of Education

Government will systematically formulate plans to achieve educational objectives, make it public and report to the diet.

- Chapter 4 Enactment of Laws and Regulations

- Article 18

"Laws and regulations necessary to implement the provisions stipulated in this Act shall be enacted"

== 2006 revisions ==
Soon after the passing of the Fundamental Law, there were numerous arguments suggesting its revision. Some suggested that ideas of patriotism and regard for Japanese traditions were lacking, and others maintained that such provisions could lead to renewed feelings of nationalism and subservience to the state. Such arguments have been brought up repeatedly since the law was first passed.

On April 28, 2006, the Cabinet drafted a reformed version of the law which was submitted to the 164th ordinary session of the National Diet (sitting from January to June 2006). The draft is composed of a preamble and 18 articles. The new preamble does not include the phrase "the realization of the ideals laid forth in the constitution depend on the education of the people", as is stated in the current law, and includes some additions, such as the phrases "community spirit" and "the inheritance of tradition". In addition, the "purpose of education" has been divided into five items, containing such moral provisions as "to nurture an attitude[...]to love our country and our home".

On May 2, 2006, the Ministry of Education announced that they had established a "Fundamental Law of Education Reform Promotion Headquarters" under the direction of Kenji Kosaka, the Minister of Education. The first meeting was scheduled for May 8, and a project team was established. The objective of this group is not only to regulate argument in the Diet, but also to assist in initiatives to explain the educational reforms to the public and decide on basic programs promoting education.

On December 22, 2006 the complete revision of the Fundamental Law of Education passed and was implemented. It now contains 18 Articles.

=== Main points of contention ===
Opinion was divided on whether students should receive education "according to individual ability" or "equally". The new Law does not contain the word "equally" any longer.

There was also debate about whether the absolution of school fees at public universities should be limited only to tuition costs, or should also include textbook fees, food costs, commutation costs, etc.

There was debate concerning the topic of political neutrality, namely, what kind of political education should be forbidden, and how to harmonize this with the promotion of political interest amongst students. In 1954, the Japanese government, aiming to curb political activity by the Japan Teachers' Union, passed a law designed to ensure "political neutrality" in Japanese public schools. In 2004, Prime Minister Junichiro Koizumi refused to accept a petition—written by Japanese high school students—against the deployment of the Japan Self-Defense Forces to Iraq, said to be due to the prohibition on political education.

=== Political Debate ===
On March 20, 2003, based on the discussions of the People's Educational Reform Council (a consultative body to the Prime Minister dissolved in December 2000), the Central Education Council reported to Minister of Education Atsuko Toyama on the necessity of reform to the Fundamental Law.

According to the report, the concepts expressed in the Fundamental Law should continue to be valued; however, in order to meet the challenges of the 21st century, the following reforms would be necessary.

1. the establishment of a trustworthy schooling system
2. promotion of university reform, to become leaders in the information age
3. to restore the educational ability of the family, and to promote a society in which the school, family, and local community cooperate
4. to foster attitudes to take part in community planning
5. to foster respect for Japanese traditions and culture, to encourage love for the homeland, and promote the spirit of membership in the international community
6. the realization of a society based on lifelong learning
7. to decide on a master plan to encourage education

In April 2004, the ruling Liberal Democratic and Komei Parties reached an agreement on the meaning of the term "patriotism" ("to value customs and culture, and to love our country, from which they have developed") and submitted a reform proposal to the Diet, the first such proposal to be submitted to the Diet since the end of World War II.

The proposed reforms reflect three influential lines of thinking.

1. Educational reform is necessary to nurture an educational elite and in order for Japan to continue to be a leader in developing cutting-edge technology.
2. Problem children responsible for the disintegration of Japanese society (including such problems as youth crime, bullying and truancy) can be dealt with through home discipline, the strengthening of moral education, and community service.
3. The expansion of the Ministry of Education's realm of authority is critical. The reformed law would give the Ministry of Education a virtually free hand with regards to educational administration.

== Moral education ==
The extent and nature of moral education is a frequent point of debate in government and academia.

The old Fundamental law did not contain provisions regarding moral education, although moral education features in the curriculum overseen by the Ministry of Education. Along with other provisions in order to "broaden" the scope of the law, there were added provisions regarding moral education. For example, the objective in Article 2(5)

"to foster an attitude to respect our traditions and culture, love the country and region that nurtured them, together with respect for other countries and a desire to contribute to world peace and the development of the international community"

is designed to satisfy both conservative views on patriotism and progressive views on global integration and/or focus on individualism.

Based on the 2006 Revised FLE, moral education become a formal subject in primary schools from 2018 and junior high schools from 2019. According to Fukuoka, the content of the new moral education curriculum (Tokubetsu no Kyōka – Dōtoku (Special Subject: Moral Education) emphasizes Patriotism, Public Spirit, and International Cooperation. Bamkin notes that there remain tensions between government intentions in promoting nationalist sentiments and educator's ideological orientations in the classroom. However, Bamkin suggests that educators use moral education classtime as "a site for reflection and pre-learning which supports the learning of prosocial behaviour (moral education in the broad sense)."

== See also ==
- Education in Japan
