= Kazuko Kurosawa =

Japanese costume designer (born 1954)

Kazuko Kurosawa (黒澤 和子, Kurosawa Kazuko; born April 29, 1954) is a Japanese costume designer. She is the daughter of filmmaker Akira Kurosawa and actress Yōko Yaguchi.

== Life ==
Kazuko Kurosawa was born in 1954 in Tokyo as the daughter of Akira Kurosawa. She was born during the completion party for the film Seven Samurai, which had released three days earlier. Upon the release of his film High and Low in Japan, people called the Kurosawa household and threatened to kidnap Kazuko. As a precaution, she was driven to and from school every day and grounded in order to prevent a potential kidnapping.

She studied as a stylist at the Sun Design Institute.

Kurosawa provided the costumes for Zatōichi. She was also in charge of the costume design for the taiga drama Awaiting Kirin.

She won the 2008 Genie Award for Best Achievement in Costume Design.

Her son is actor Takayuki Kato. She is married to Haruyuki Katō, the son of actor Daisuke Katō.

== Recognition ==
- 2008 Genie Award for Best Achievement in Costume Design - Silk - Won (with Carlo Poggioli)
