= Akira Kurosawa =

Japanese filmmaker (1910–1998)

- 黒澤 明
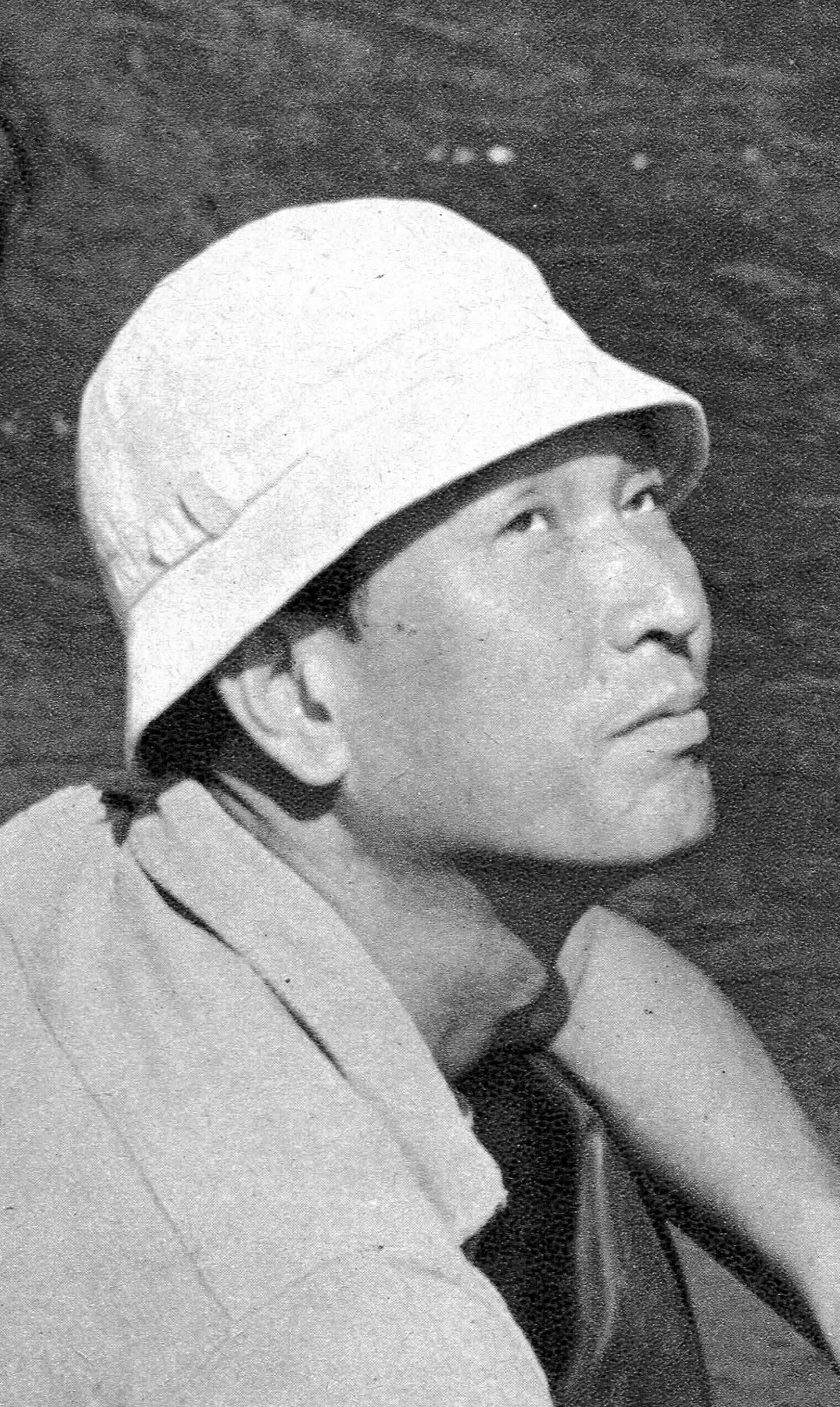
- Kurosawa in 1953
- Born: March 23, 1910; Shinagawa, Tokyo, Japan
- Died: September 6, 1998 (aged 88); Setagaya, Tokyo, Japan
- Resting place: An'yō-in, Kamakura, Japan
- Occupations: Film director; screenwriter; producer; editor; painter
- Years active: 1936–1993
- Spouse: Yōko Yaguchi (m. 1945; died 1985)
- Children: 2, including Kazuko

Akira Kurosawa (Note: English: /əˈkɪərə ˌkʊərəˈsɑːwə/ ə-KEER-ə KOOR-ə-SAH-wə, Japanese: [kɯɾosawa aꜜkiɾa].) (黒澤 明 or 黒沢 明, Kurosawa Akira; March 23, 1910 – September 6, 1998) was a Japanese filmmaker who directed 30 feature films in a career spanning six decades. With a bold and dynamic style strongly influenced by Western cinema yet distinct from it, he is widely regarded as one of the greatest and most influential filmmakers in the history of cinema. Known as a hands-on filmmaker, he was heavily involved with all aspects of production as a director, writer, producer, and editor.

Following a brief stint as a painter, Kurosawa entered the Japanese film industry in 1936. After years of working on numerous films as an assistant director and screenwriter, he made his directorial debut during World War II with the popular action film Sanshiro Sugata (1943), released when he was 33. Following the war, he cemented his reputation as one of the most important young filmmakers in Japan with the critically acclaimed Drunken Angel (1948), in which he cast the then-unknown actor Toshiro Mifune in a starring role; the two men would then collaborate on 15 more films.

Rashomon (1950) premiered in Tokyo and became the surprise winner of the Golden Lion at the 1951 Venice Film Festival. The film's commercial and critical success opened Western film markets to Japanese films for the first time, which in turn led to international recognition for other Japanese filmmakers. Kurosawa directed approximately one film per year throughout the 1950s and early 1960s, including a number of highly regarded and often adapted films, including Ikiru (1952), Seven Samurai (1954), Throne of Blood (1957), The Hidden Fortress (1958), Yojimbo (1961), High and Low (1963), and Red Beard (1965). He became much less prolific after the 1960s, though his later work—including two of his final films, Kagemusha (1980) and Ran (1985)—continued to receive critical acclaim.

In 1990, Kurosawa accepted the Academy Honorary Award. He was posthumously named "Asian of the Century" in the "Arts, Literature, and Culture" category by AsianWeek magazine and CNN, who cited him as one of the five people who most prominently contributed to the improvement of Asia in the 20th century. His career has been honored by many releases in many consumer media in addition to retrospectives, critical studies, and biographies in both print and video.

== Life and career ==
=== Childhood to war years (1910–1945) ===
==== Childhood and youth (1910–1935) ====
Kurosawa was born on March 23, 1910, in Ōi Town, Ebara County (now Higashi-Ōi in the Shinagawa ward of Tokyo). However, he once claimed he was born in Akita and later came to Tokyo as an infant. His mother, Shima (1870–1952), came from a merchant's family in Osaka; his father, Isamu (1864–1948), was a member of a samurai family from Akita Prefecture and worked as the director of the Army's Physical Education Institute's lower secondary school. Akira was the eighth and youngest child of the moderately wealthy family, with two of his siblings already grown up at the time of his birth and one deceased, leaving him to grow up with three sisters and a brother.

In addition to promoting physical exercise, Isamu was open to Western traditions, and considered theatre and cinema to have educational merit. He encouraged his children to watch films; a young Kurosawa saw his first film at age six. He attended elementary school and became close friends with Keinosuke Uekusa, while an important formative influence was his teacher Mr. Tachikawa, whose progressive educational practices ignited in him first a love of drawing and then an interest in education in general. During this time, he also studied calligraphy and Kendo swordsmanship.

Another major childhood influence was Kurosawa's older brother by four years, Heigo (1906–1933). In the aftermath of the Great Kantō earthquake and the subsequent Kantō Massacre of 1923, Heigo took the 13-year-old Kurosawa to view the devastation. When Kurosawa wanted to look away from the human and animal corpses scattered everywhere, Heigo forbade him to do so, encouraging him to instead face his fears by confronting them directly. Some commentators have suggested that this incident would influence Kurosawa's later artistic career, as he was easily willing to confront and explore unpleasant truths in his work. Heigo was academically gifted, but after failing to secure a place in Tokyo's foremost high school, he began to detach himself from the rest of the family and preferred to concentrate on his interest in foreign literature. In the late 1920s, Heigo quickly made a name for himself as a benshi (silent film narrator) for Tokyo theaters showing foreign films. Kurosawa, who at this point planned to become a painter, moved in with Heigo and the two became inseparable.

With Heigo's guidance, Kurosawa avidly watched not only films but also theater and circus performances, while exhibiting his paintings and working for the left-wing Proletarian Artists' League. He was never able to make a living from his art and lost his enthusiasm for painting because of this and his growing belief that most of the proletarian movement boiled down to "putting unfulfilled political ideals directly onto the canvas". With the increasing production of talking pictures in the early 1930s, film narrators like Heigo began to lose work, and Kurosawa moved back in with his parents. In July 1933, Heigo took his own life; Kurosawa has commented on the lasting sense of loss he felt at his brother's death, and the chapter of Something Like an Autobiography that describes it—written nearly 50 years after the event—is titled "A Story I Don't Want to Tell". Just four months after Heigo's suicide, Kurosawa's eldest brother also died, leaving 23-year-old Kurosawa as the sole surviving brother amongst his three sisters.

==== Director in training (1935–1941) ====
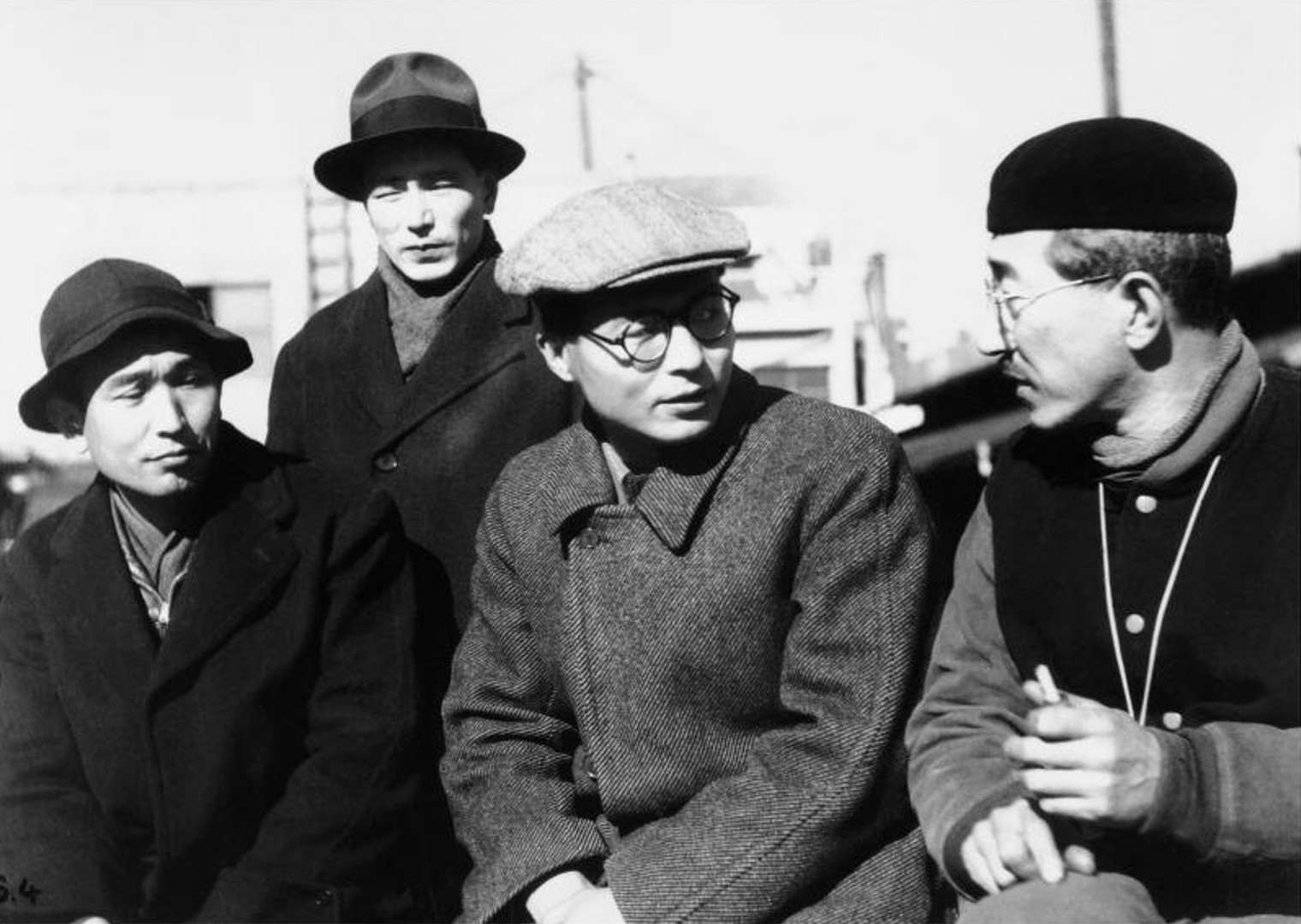
From the left: Kurosawa, Ishirō Honda, and Senkichi Taniguchi with their mentor Kajirō Yamamoto, late 1930s

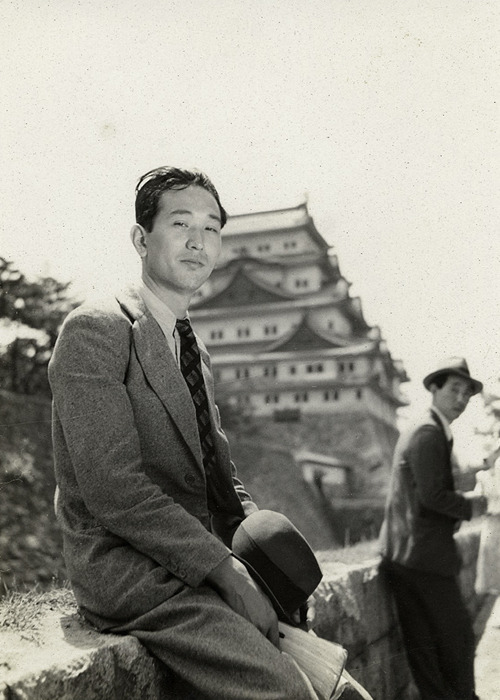
Kurosawa (left) and Mikio Naruse (right) during the production of Avalanche (1937)

In 1935, the new film studio Photo Chemical Laboratories, known as P.C.L. (which later became the major studio Toho), advertised for assistant directors. Although he had shown no prior interest in film as a profession, Kurosawa submitted the required essay, which asked applicants to discuss the fundamental deficiencies of Japanese films and find ways to overcome them. His half-mocking view was that if the deficiencies were fundamental, there was no way to correct them. Kurosawa's essay earned him a call to take the follow-up exams, and the director Kajirō Yamamoto, who was one of the examiners, took a liking to Kurosawa and insisted that the studio hire him. Kurosawa joined P.C.L. in February 1936, at the age of 25.

During his five years as an assistant director, Kurosawa worked under numerous directors, but by far the most important figure in his development was Yamamoto. Of his 24 films as A.D., he worked on 17 under Yamamoto, many of them comedies featuring the popular actor Ken'ichi Enomoto, known as "Enoken". Yamamoto nurtured Kurosawa's talent, promoting him directly from third assistant director to chief assistant director after a year. Kurosawa's responsibilities increased, and he worked at tasks ranging from stage construction and film development to location scouting, script polishing, rehearsals, lighting, dubbing, editing, and second-unit directing. In the last of Kurosawa's films as an assistant director for Yamamoto, Horse (1941), Kurosawa took over most of the production, as his mentor was occupied with the shooting of another film.

Yamamoto advised Kurosawa that a good director needed to master screenwriting. Kurosawa soon realized that the potential earnings from his scripts were much higher than what he was paid as an assistant director. He later wrote or co-wrote all his films and frequently penned screenplays for other directors such as Satsuo Yamamoto's film, A Triumph of Wings (Tsubasa no gaika, 1942). This outside scriptwriting would serve Kurosawa as a lucrative sideline lasting well into the 1960s, long after he became famous.

==== Wartime films and marriage (1942–1945) ====
In the two years following the release of Horse in 1941, Kurosawa searched for a story he could use to launch his directing career. Towards the end of 1942, about a year after the Japanese attack on Pearl Harbor, novelist Tsuneo Tomita published his Musashi Miyamoto-inspired judo novel, Sanshiro Sugata, the advertisements for which intrigued Kurosawa. He bought the book on its publication day, devoured it in one sitting, and immediately asked Toho to secure the film rights. Kurosawa's initial instinct proved correct as, within a few days, three other major Japanese studios also offered to buy the rights. Toho prevailed, and Kurosawa began pre-production on his directorial debut.

Shooting of Sanshiro Sugata began on location in Yokohama in December 1942. Production proceeded smoothly, but getting the completed film past the censors was an entirely different matter. The censorship office deemed the work objectionably "British-American" by the standards of wartime Japan, and it was only through the intervention of director Yasujirō Ozu, who championed the film, that Sanshiro Sugata was finally accepted for release on March 25, 1943. (Kurosawa had just turned 33.) The movie became both a critical and commercial success. Nevertheless, the censorship office later decided to cut out 18 minutes of footage, much of which is now considered lost.

He next turned to the subject of wartime female factory workers in The Most Beautiful, a propaganda film which he shot in a semi-documentary style in early 1944. To elicit realistic performances from his actresses, the director had them live in a real factory during the shoot, eat the factory food, and call each other by their character names. He would use similar methods with his performers throughout his career. During production, the actress playing the leader of the factory workers, Yōko Yaguchi, was chosen by her colleagues to present their demands to the director. She and Kurosawa were constantly at odds, and it was through these arguments that the two paradoxically became close. They married on May 21, 1945, with Yaguchi two months pregnant (she never resumed her acting career), and the couple would remain together until her death in 1985. They had two children, both surviving Kurosawa: a son, Hisao, born December 20, 1945, who served as producer on some of his father's last projects, and Kazuko, a daughter, born April 29, 1954, who became a costume designer.

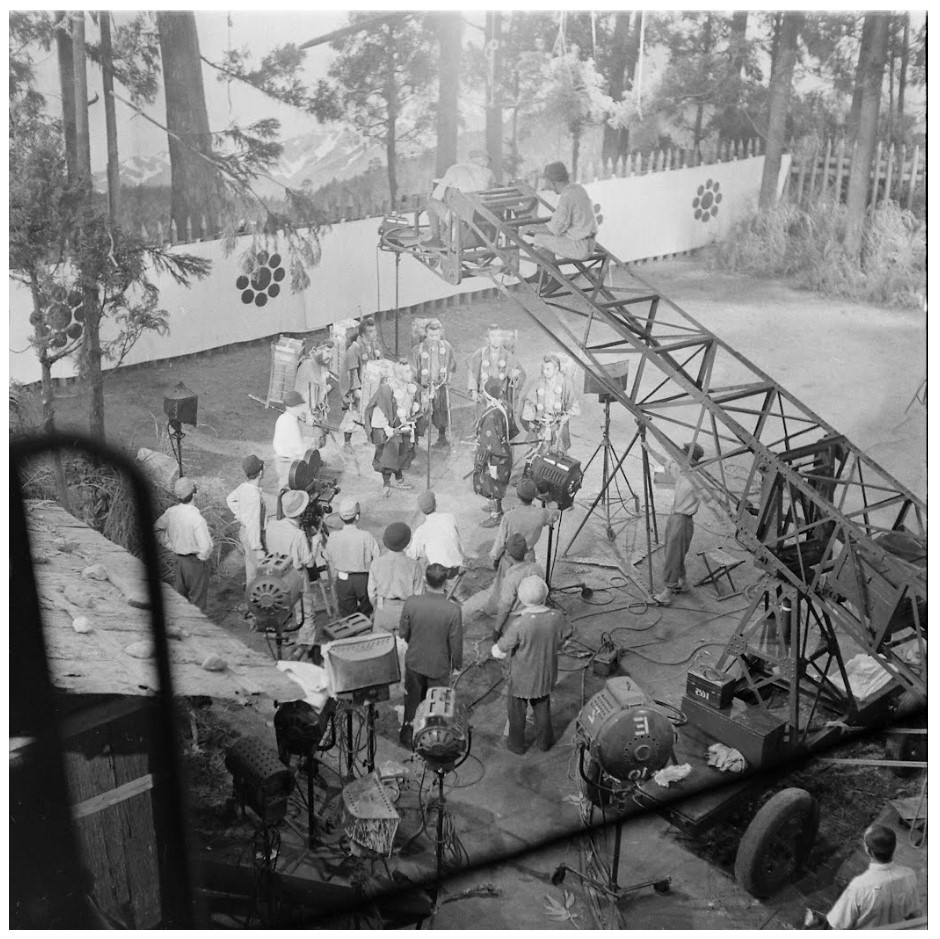
Filming of The Men Who Tread on the Tiger's Tail, 1945

Shortly before his marriage, Kurosawa was pressured by the studio against his will to direct a sequel to his debut film. The often blatantly propagandistic Sanshiro Sugata Part II, which premiered in May 1945, is generally considered one of his weakest pictures.

Kurosawa decided to write the script for a film that would be both censor-friendly and less expensive to produce. The Men Who Tread on the Tiger's Tail, based on the Kabuki play Kanjinchō and starring the comedian Enoken, with whom Kurosawa had often worked during his assistant director days, was completed in September 1945. By this time, Japan had surrendered, and the occupation of Japan had begun. The new American censors interpreted the values allegedly promoted in the picture as overly "feudal" and banned the work. It was not released until 1952, the year another Kurosawa film, Ikiru, was also released. While in production, the film had already been heavily censored by Japanese wartime censors as too Western and "democratic" (they particularly disliked the comic porter played by Enoken), so the movie most probably would not have seen the light of day even if the war had continued beyond its completion.

=== Early postwar years to Red Beard (1946–1965) ===
==== First postwar works (1946–1950) ====
After the war, Kurosawa, influenced by the democratic ideals of the Occupation, sought to make films that would establish a new respect towards the individual and the self. The first such film, No Regrets for Our Youth (1946), inspired by both the 1933 Takigawa incident and the Hotsumi Ozaki wartime spy case, criticized Japan's prewar regime for its political oppression. (Note: In 1946, Kurosawa co-directed, with his mentor, Kajiro Yamamoto, and Hideo Sekigawa, the feature Those Who Make Tomorrow (Asu o tsukuru hitobito). Apparently, he was commanded to make this film against his will by Toho studios, to which he was under contract at the time. (He claimed that his part of the film was shot in only a week.) It was the only film he ever directed for which he did not receive sole credit as director and the only one that has never been released on home video in any form. The movie was later repudiated by Kurosawa and is often not counted with the 30 other films he made, though it is listed in some filmographies of the director.) Atypically for the director, the heroic central character is a woman, Yukie (Setsuko Hara), who, born into upper-middle-class privilege, comes to question her values in a time of political crisis. The original script had to be extensively rewritten and, because of its controversial theme and the gender of its protagonist, the completed work divided critics. Nevertheless, it managed to win the approval of audiences, who turned variations on the film's title ("no regrets for...") into a postwar catchphrase.

His next film, One Wonderful Sunday, premiered in July 1947 to mixed reviews. It was the result of a collaboration with his childhood friend Keinosuke Uekusa. The film is a sentimental love story dealing with an impoverished couple trying to enjoy their one weekly day off within the devastation of postwar Tokyo. The movie bears the influence of Frank Capra, D. W. Griffith and F. W. Murnau, each of whom was among Kurosawa's favorite directors. Another film released in 1947 with Kurosawa's involvement was the action-adventure thriller, Snow Trail, directed by Senkichi Taniguchi from Kurosawa's screenplay. It marked the debut of the intense young actor Toshiro Mifune. It was Kurosawa who, with his mentor Yamamoto, had intervened to persuade Toho to sign Mifune, during an audition in which the young man greatly impressed Kurosawa, but managed to alienate most of the other judges.

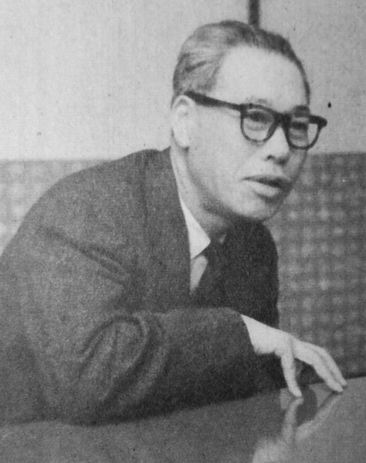
Takashi Shimura played a dedicated doctor helping an ailing gangster in Drunken Angel. Shimura performed in over 20 of Kurosawa's films.

Drunken Angel is often considered the director's first major work. Although the script, like all of Kurosawa's occupation-era works, had to go through rewrites due to American censorship, Kurosawa felt that this was the first film in which he was able to express himself freely. A gritty story of a doctor who tries to save a gangster (yakuza) with tuberculosis, it was also the first time that Kurosawa directed Mifune, who went on to play major roles in all but one of the director's next 16 films (the exception being Ikiru). While Mifune was not cast as the protagonist in Drunken Angel, his explosive performance as the gangster so dominates the drama that he shifted the focus from the title character, the alcoholic doctor played by Takashi Shimura, who had already appeared in several Kurosawa movies. However, Kurosawa did not want to smother the young actor's immense vitality, and Mifune's rebellious character electrified audiences in much the way that Marlon Brando's defiant stance would startle American film audiences a few years later. The film premiered in Tokyo in April 1948 to rave reviews and was chosen by the prestigious Kinema Junpo critics poll as the best film of its year, the first of three Kurosawa movies to be so honored.

After the completion of Drunken Angel, Toho became embroiled in a months-long labor strike, in which the Toho union occupied the grounds of the studio. When Toho management ceased paying workers' salaries, Kurosawa formed a touring acting troupe to raise funds, directing Anton Chekhov's The Proposal, and an adaptation of Drunken Angel starring Mifune and Shimura. Disillusioned by the division and violence between employees at Toho, the underhanded tactics of Toho leadership, and the breaking of the occupation by police and military standoff, Kurosawa left Toho, later recalling: "I had come to understand that the studio I had thought was my home actually belonged to strangers". Kurosawa, with producer Sōjirō Motoki and fellow directors and friends Kajiro Yamamoto, Mikio Naruse and Senkichi Taniguchi, formed a new independent production unit called Film Art Association (Eiga Geijutsu Kyōkai). For this organization's debut work, and first film for Daiei studios, Kurosawa turned to a contemporary play by Kazuo Kikuta and, together with Taniguchi, adapted it for the screen. The Quiet Duel starred Toshiro Mifune as an idealistic young doctor struggling with syphilis, a deliberate attempt by Kurosawa to break the actor away from being typecast as gangsters. Released in March 1949, it was a box office success, but is generally considered one of the director's lesser achievements.

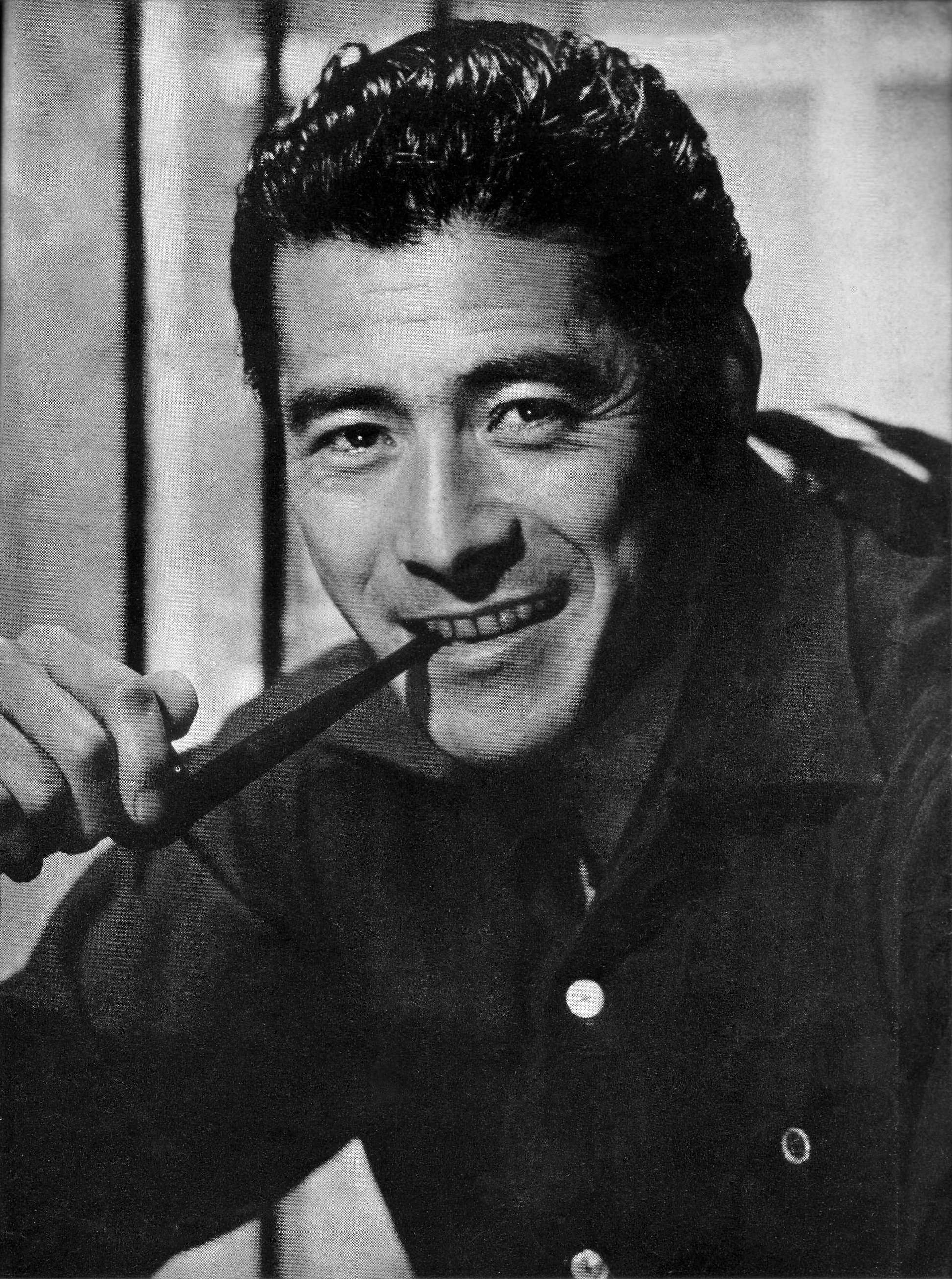
Toshiro Mifune, a frequent lead in Kurosawa's films, in 1954

His second film of 1949, also produced by Film Art Association and released by Shintoho, was Stray Dog. It is a detective movie (perhaps the first important Japanese film in that genre) that explores the mood of Japan during its painful postwar recovery through the story of a young detective, played by Mifune, and his fixation on the recovery of his handgun, which was stolen by a penniless war veteran who proceeds to use it to rob and murder. Adapted from an unpublished novel by Kurosawa in the style of a favorite writer of his, Georges Simenon, it was the director's first collaboration with screenwriter Ryuzo Kikushima, who would later help to script eight other Kurosawa films. A famous, virtually wordless sequence, lasting over eight minutes, shows the detective, disguised as an impoverished veteran, wandering the streets in search of the gun thief; it employed actual documentary footage of war-ravaged Tokyo neighborhoods shot by Kurosawa's friend, Ishirō Honda, the future director of Godzilla. The film is considered a precursor to the contemporary police procedural and buddy cop film genres.

Scandal, released by Shochiku in April 1950, was inspired by the director's personal experiences with (and anger towards) Japanese yellow journalism. The work is an ambitious mixture of courtroom drama and social problem film about free speech and personal responsibility, but even Kurosawa regarded the finished product as dramatically unfocused and unsatisfactory, and almost all critics agree. However, it would be Kurosawa's second film of 1950 that would ultimately win him (and Japanese cinema) a whole new international audience.

==== International recognition (1950–1952) ====
After finishing Scandal, Kurosawa was approached by Daiei studios to make another film for them. Kurosawa picked a script by an aspiring young screenwriter, Shinobu Hashimoto, who would eventually work on nine of his films. Their first joint effort was based on Ryūnosuke Akutagawa's experimental short story "In a Grove", which recounts the murder of a samurai and the rape of his wife from various different and conflicting points of view. Kurosawa saw potential in the script and, with Hashimoto's help, polished and expanded it, then pitched it to Daiei, which was happy to accept the project due to its low budget. The shooting of Rashomon began on July 7, 1950, and, after extensive location work in the primeval forest of Nara, wrapped up on August 17. Just one week was spent in hurried post-production, hampered by a studio fire, and the finished film premiered at Tokyo's Imperial Theatre on August 25, expanding nationwide the following day. The movie was met by lukewarm reviews, with many critics puzzled by its unique theme and treatment, but it was nevertheless a moderate financial success for Daiei.

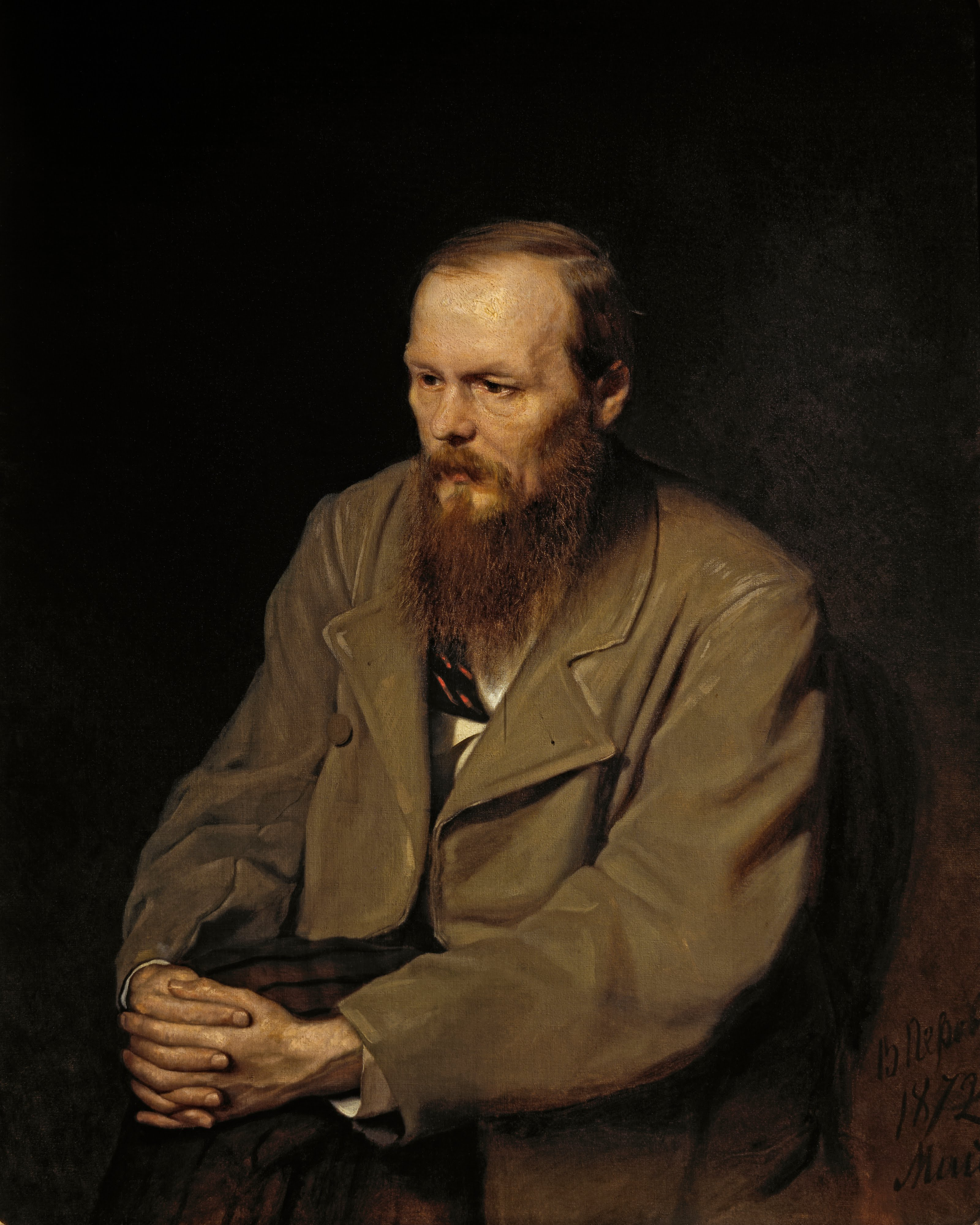
Fyodor Dostoevsky wrote The Idiot, which Kurosawa adapted into a Japanese film of the same name in 1951. Vasily Perov's portrait from 1872

Kurosawa's next film, for Shochiku, was The Idiot, an adaptation of the novel by the director's favorite writer, Fyodor Dostoevsky. The story is relocated from Russia to Hokkaido, but otherwise adheres closely to the original, a fact seen by many critics as detrimental to the work. A studio-mandated edit shortened it from Kurosawa's original cut of 265 minutes to just 166 minutes, making the resulting narrative exceedingly difficult to follow. The severely edited film version is widely considered to be one of the director's least successful works, and the original full-length version no longer exists. Contemporary reviews of the much shortened edited version were very negative, but the film was a moderate success at the box office, largely because of the popularity of one of its stars, Setsuko Hara.

Meanwhile, unbeknownst to Kurosawa, Rashomon had been entered in the Venice Film Festival, due to the efforts of Giuliana Stramigioli, a Japan-based representative of an Italian film company, who had seen and admired the movie and convinced Daiei to submit it. On September 10, 1951, Rashomon was awarded the festival's highest prize, the Golden Lion, shocking not only Daiei but the international film world, which at the time was largely unaware of Japan's decades-old cinematic tradition. After Daiei briefly exhibited a subtitled print of the film in Los Angeles, RKO purchased distribution rights to Rashomon in the United States. The company was taking a considerable gamble. It had put out only one prior subtitled film in the American market, and the only previous Japanese talkie commercially released in New York had been Mikio Naruse's comedy, Wife! Be Like a Rose!, in 1937: a critical and box-office flop. However, Rashomon's commercial run, greatly helped by strong reviews from critics and even the columnist Ed Sullivan, earned $35,000 in its first three weeks at a single New York theatre, an almost unheard-of sum at the time.

This success in turn led to a vogue in America and the West for Japanese movies throughout the 1950s, replacing the enthusiasm for Italian neorealist cinema. By the end of 1952 Rashomon was released in Japan, the United States, and most of Europe. Among the Japanese film-makers whose work, as a result, began to win festival prizes and commercial release in the West were Kenji Mizoguchi (The Life of Oharu, Ugetsu, Sansho the Bailiff) and, somewhat later, Yasujirō Ozu (Tokyo Story, An Autumn Afternoon)—artists highly respected in Japan but, before this period, almost totally unknown in the West.

==== Contemporary dramas and Seven Samurai (1952–1955) ====
His career boosted by his sudden international fame, Kurosawa, now reunited with his original film studio, Toho (which would go on to produce his next 11 films), set to work on his next project, Ikiru. Based on Leo Tolstoy's The Death of Ivan Ilyich, the movie stars Takashi Shimura as a cancer-ridden Tokyo bureaucrat, Watanabe, on a final quest for meaning before his death. For the screenplay, Kurosawa brought in Hashimoto as well as writer Hideo Oguni, who would go on to co-write twelve Kurosawa films. Despite the work's grim subject matter, the screenwriters took a satirical approach, which some have compared to the work of Brecht, to both the bureaucratic world of its hero and the U.S. cultural colonization of Japan. (American pop songs figure prominently in the film.) Because of this strategy, the filmmakers are usually credited with saving the picture from the kind of sentimentality common to dramas about terminally ill characters. Ikiru opened in October 1952 to rave reviews—it won Kurosawa his second Kinema Junpo "Best Film" award—and enormous box office success. It remains the most acclaimed of all the artist's films set in the modern era.

In December 1952, Kurosawa took his Ikiru screenwriters, Shinobu Hashimoto and Hideo Oguni, for a forty-five-day secluded residence at an inn to create the screenplay for his next movie, Seven Samurai. The ensemble work was Kurosawa's first proper samurai film, the genre for which he would become most famous. The simple story, about a poor farming village in Sengoku period Japan that hires a group of samurai to defend it against an impending attack by bandits, was given a full epic treatment, with a huge cast (largely consisting of veterans of previous Kurosawa productions) and meticulously detailed action, stretching out to almost three-and-a-half hours of screen time.

Three months were spent in pre-production and a month in rehearsals. Shooting took 148 days spread over almost a year, interrupted by production and financing troubles and Kurosawa's health problems. The film finally opened in April 1954, half a year behind its original release date and about three times over budget, making it at the time the most expensive Japanese film ever made. (However, by Hollywood standards, it was a quite modestly budgeted production, even for that time.) The film received positive critical reaction and became a big hit, quickly making back the money invested in it and providing the studio with a product that they could (and did) market internationally—though with extensive edits. Over time—and with the theatrical and home video releases of the uncut version—its reputation has steadily grown. It is now regarded by some commentators as the greatest Japanese film ever made, and in 1999 a poll of Japanese film critics also voted it the best Japanese film ever made. In the most recent (2022) version of the widely respected British Film Institute (BFI) Sight & Sound "Greatest Films of All Time" poll, Seven Samurai placed 20th among all films from all countries in the critics' and tied at 14th in the directors' polls, receiving a place in the Top Ten lists of 48 critics and 22 directors.

In 1954, nuclear tests in the Pacific were believed to be causing radioactive rainstorms in Japan, and one specific boat near the Marshall Islands incident was exposed to nuclear fallout, with harmful results. It was in this anxious atmosphere that Kurosawa's next film, I Live in Fear, was conceived. The story concerned an elderly factory owner (Toshiro Mifune) so terrified of the prospect of a nuclear attack that he becomes determined to move his entire extended family (both legal and extra-marital) to what he imagines is the safety of a farm in Brazil. Production went much more smoothly than the director's previous film, but a few days before shooting ended, Kurosawa's composer, collaborator, and close friend Fumio Hayasaka died (of tuberculosis) at the age of 41. The film's score was finished by Hayasaka's student, Masaru Sato, who would go on to score all of Kurosawa's next eight films. I Live in Fear opened in November 1955 to mixed reviews and muted audience reaction, becoming the first Kurosawa film to lose money during its original theatrical run. Today, it is considered by many to be among the finest films dealing with the psychological effects of the global nuclear stalemate.

==== Adaptations and birth of a company (1956–1960) ====
Kurosawa's next project, Throne of Blood, an adaptation of William Shakespeare's Macbeth—set, like Seven Samurai, in the Sengoku Era—represented an ambitious transposition of the English work into a Japanese context. Kurosawa instructed his leading actress, Isuzu Yamada, to regard the work as if it were a cinematic version of a Japanese rather than a European literary classic. Given Kurosawa's appreciation of traditional Japanese stage acting, the actor's performances, particularly Yamada, draws heavily on the stylized techniques of the Noh theater. It was filmed in 1956 and released in January 1957 to a slightly less negative domestic response than the director's previous film. Abroad, Throne of Blood, regardless of the liberties it takes with its source material, quickly earned a place among the most celebrated Shakespeare adaptations.

Another adaptation of a classic European theatrical work followed almost immediately, with production of The Lower Depths, based on a play by Maxim Gorky, taking place in May and June 1957. In contrast to the Shakespearean sweep of Throne of Blood, The Lower Depths was shot on only two confined sets, in order to emphasize the restricted nature of the characters' lives. Though faithful to the play, this adaptation of Russian material to a completely Japanese setting—in this case, the late Edo period—unlike his earlier The Idiot, was regarded as artistically successful. The film premiered in September 1957, receiving a mixed response similar to that of Throne of Blood. However, some critics rank it among the director's most underrated works.

Kurosawa's next three movies after Seven Samurai had not managed to capture Japanese audiences in the way that the film had. The mood of the director's work had been growing increasingly pessimistic and dark even as Japan entered a boom period of high-speed growth and rising standards of living. Out of step with the prevailing mood of the era, Kurosawa's films questioned the possibility of redemption through personal responsibility, particularly in Throne of Blood and The Lower Depths. He recognized this and deliberately aimed for a lighter, more entertaining film for his next production while switching to the new widescreen format that was gaining popularity in Japan. The resulting film, The Hidden Fortress, is an action-adventure comedy-drama about a medieval princess, her loyal general, and two peasants who must travel through enemy lines in order to reach their home region. Released in December 1958, The Hidden Fortress became an enormous box-office success in Japan and was warmly received by critics both in Japan and abroad. Today, the film is considered one of Kurosawa's most lightweight efforts, though it remains popular, not least because it is one of several major influences on George Lucas's 1977 space opera, Star Wars.

Starting with Rashomon, Kurosawa's productions had become increasingly large in scope, and so had the director's budgets. Toho, concerned about this development, suggested that he might help finance his own projects, thereby reducing the studio's potential losses and, in turn, allowing him more artistic freedom as co-producer. Kurosawa agreed, and the Kurosawa Production Company was established in April 1959, with Toho as the majority shareholder.

Despite risking his own money, Kurosawa chose a story that was more directly critical of the Japanese business and political elites than any previous work. The Bad Sleep Well, based on a script by Kurosawa's nephew Mike Inoue, is a revenge drama about a young man who is able to infiltrate the hierarchy of a corrupt Japanese company with the intention of exposing the men responsible for his father's death. Its theme proved topical: while the film was in production, the massive Anpo protests were held against the new U.S.–Japan Security treaty, which was seen by many Japanese, particularly the young, as threatening the country's democracy by giving too much power to corporations and politicians. The film opened in September 1960 to positive critical reaction and modest box office success. The 25-minute opening sequence depicting a corporate wedding reception is widely regarded as one of Kurosawa's most skillfully executed set pieces, but the remainder of the film is often perceived as disappointing by comparison. The movie has also been criticized for employing the conventional Kurosawan hero to combat a social evil that cannot be resolved through the actions of individuals, however courageous or cunning.

==== Box-office success (1961–1964) ====
Yojimbo (The Bodyguard), Kurosawa Production's second film, centers on a masterless samurai, Sanjuro, who strolls into a 19th-century town ruled by two opposing violent factions and provokes them into destroying each other. The director used this work to play with many genre conventions, particularly the Western, while also offering an unprecedented graphic portrayal of violence (for the Japanese screen). Some commentators have seen the Sanjuro character in this film as a fantasy figure who magically reverses the historical triumph of the corrupt merchant class over the samurai class. Featuring Tatsuya Nakadai in his first major role in a Kurosawa movie, and with innovative photography by Kazuo Miyagawa (who shot Rashomon) and Takao Saito, the film premiered in April 1961 and was a critically and commercially successful venture, earning more than any previous Kurosawa film. The movie and its blackly comic tone were also widely imitated abroad. Sergio Leone's A Fistful of Dollars was a virtual (unauthorized) scene-by-scene remake with Toho filing a lawsuit on Kurosawa's behalf and prevailing.

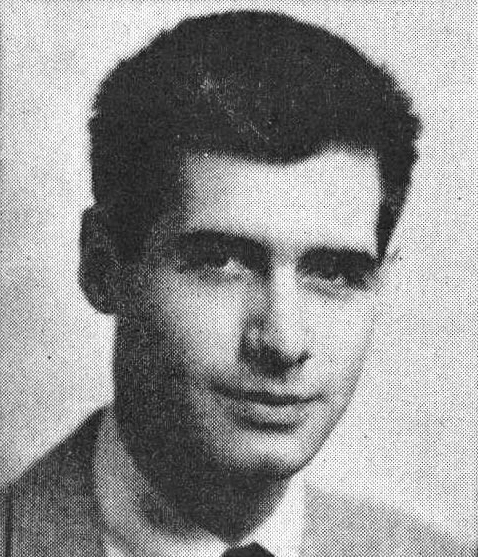
Kurosawa based his 1963 crime film High and Low on Ed McBain's novel King's Ransom. Image of McBain, 1953

Following the success of Yojimbo, Kurosawa found himself under pressure from Toho to create a sequel. Kurosawa turned to a script he had written before Yojimbo, reworking it to include the hero of his previous film. Sanjuro was the first of three Kurosawa films adapted from the work of the writer Shūgorō Yamamoto, the others being Red Beard and Dodeskaden. It is lighter in tone and closer to a conventional period film than Yojimbo, though its story of a power struggle within a samurai clan is portrayed with strongly comic undertones. The film opened on January 1, 1962, quickly surpassing Yojimbo's box office success and garnering positive reviews.

Kurosawa had meanwhile instructed Toho to purchase the film rights to King's Ransom, a novel about a kidnapping written by American author and screenwriter Evan Hunter, under his pseudonym of Ed McBain, as one of his 87th Precinct series of crime books. The director intended to create a work condemning kidnapping, which he considered one of the very worst crimes. The suspense film, titled High and Low, was shot in the latter half of 1962 and released in March 1963. It broke Kurosawa's box office record (the third film in a row to do so), became the highest-grossing Japanese film of the year, and won glowing reviews. His triumph was somewhat tarnished when the film was blamed for a wave of kidnappings which occurred in Japan about this time. He himself received kidnapping threats directed at his young daughter, Kazuko. High and Low is considered by many commentators to be among the director's strongest works.

==== Red Beard (1965) ====
Kurosawa quickly moved on to his next project, Red Beard. Based on a short story collection by Shūgorō Yamamoto and incorporating elements from Dostoevsky's novel The Insulted and Injured, it is a period film, set in a mid-nineteenth-century clinic for the poor, in which Kurosawa's humanist themes receive perhaps their fullest statement. A conceited and materialistic, foreign-trained young doctor, Yasumoto, is forced to become an intern at the clinic under the stern tutelage of Doctor Niide, known as "Akahige" ("Red Beard"), played by Mifune. Although he initially resists Red Beard, Yasumoto comes to admire his wisdom and courage and to perceive the patients at the clinic, whom he at first despised, as worthy of compassion and dignity.

Yūzō Kayama, who plays Yasumoto, was an extremely popular film and music star at the time, particularly for his "Young Guy" (Wakadaishō) series of musical comedies, so signing him to appear in the film virtually guaranteed Kurosawa a strong box-office. The shoot, the filmmaker's longest ever, lasted well over a year (after five months of pre-production) and wrapped up in spring 1965, leaving the director, his crew, and his actors exhausted. Red Beard premiered in April 1965, becoming the year's highest-grossing Japanese production and the third (and last) Kurosawa film to top the prestigious Kinema Jumpo yearly critics poll. It remains one of Kurosawa's best-known and most-loved works in his native country. Outside Japan, critics have been much more divided. Most commentators concede its technical merits and some praise it as among Kurosawa's best, while others insist that it lacks complexity and genuine narrative power, with still others claiming that it represents a retreat from the artist's previous commitment to social and political change.

The film marked something of an end of an era for its creator. The director himself recognized this at the time of its release, telling critic Donald Richie that a cycle of some kind had just come to an end and that his future films and production methods would be different. His prediction proved quite accurate. Beginning in the late 1950s, television increasingly dominated the leisure time of the formerly large and loyal Japanese cinema audience. And as film company revenues dropped, so did their appetite for risk—particularly the risk represented by Kurosawa's costly production methods. Red Beard also marked the midway point, chronologically, in the artist's career. During his previous twenty-nine years in the film industry (including his five years as assistant director), he had directed twenty-three films; during the remaining twenty-eight years, for many complex reasons, he would complete only seven more. Also, for reasons never adequately explained, Red Beard would be his final film starring Toshiro Mifune. Yū Fujiki, an actor who worked on The Lower Depths, observed, regarding the closeness of the two men on the set, "Mr. Kurosawa's heart was in Mr. Mifune's body." Donald Richie has described the rapport between them as a unique "symbiosis".

=== Hollywood ambitions to last films (1966–1998) ===
==== Hollywood detour (1966–1968) ====
When Kurosawa's exclusive contract with Toho ended in 1966, the 56-year-old director was seriously contemplating change. Observing the troubled state of the domestic film industry and having already received dozens of offers from abroad, he found the idea of working outside Japan more appealing than ever. For his first foreign project, Kurosawa chose a story based on a Life magazine article. The Embassy Pictures action thriller, to be filmed in English and called simply Runaway Train, would have been his first in color. But the language barrier proved a major problem, and the English version of the screenplay was not even finished by the time filming was to begin in autumn 1966. The shoot, which required snow, was moved to autumn 1967, then canceled in 1968. Almost two decades later, another foreign director working in Hollywood, Andrei Konchalovsky, finally made Runaway Train (1985), though from a new script loosely based on Kurosawa's.

The director, meanwhile, had become involved in a much more ambitious Hollywood project. Tora! Tora! Tora!, produced by 20th Century Fox and Kurosawa Production, would be a portrayal of the Japanese attack on Pearl Harbor from both the American and the Japanese points of view, with Kurosawa helming the Japanese half and an Anglophonic film-maker directing the American half. He spent several months working on the script with Ryuzo Kikushima and Hideo Oguni, but the project soon began to unravel. The director of the American sequences turned out not to be David Lean, as originally planned, but American Richard Fleischer. The budget was also cut, and the screen time allocated for the Japanese segment would now be no longer than 90 minutes—a major problem, considering that Kurosawa's script ran over four hours. After numerous revisions with the direct involvement of Darryl Zanuck, a largely finalized screenplay was agreed upon in May 1968.

Shooting began in early December, but Kurosawa would serve as director for only three weeks. He struggled to work with an unfamiliar crew and the requirements of a Hollywood production, while his working methods puzzled his American producers, who ultimately concluded that the director must be mentally ill. Kurosawa was examined at Kyoto University Hospital by a neuropsychologist, Dr. Murakami, whose diagnosis was forwarded to Darryl Zanuck and Richard Zanuck at Fox studios indicating a diagnosis of neurasthenia stating that, "He is suffering from disturbance of sleep, agitated with feelings of anxiety and in manic excitement caused by the above mentioned illness. It is necessary for him to have rest and medical treatment for more than two months." On Christmas Eve 1968, the Americans announced that Kurosawa had left the production due to "fatigue", effectively firing him. He was ultimately replaced, for the film's Japanese sequences, with two directors, Kinji Fukasaku and Toshio Masuda.

Tora! Tora! Tora!, finally released to unenthusiastic reviews in September 1970, was, as Donald Richie put it, an "almost unmitigated tragedy" in Kurosawa's career. He had spent years on a logistically nightmarish project to which he ultimately did not contribute a single foot of film shot himself. (He had his name removed from the credits, though the script used for the Japanese half was still his and his co-writers'.) He became estranged from his longtime collaborator, writer Ryuzo Kikushima, and never worked with him again. The project inadvertently exposed corruption within his production company (a situation reminiscent of his own movie, The Bad Sleep Well). His very sanity had been called into question. Worst of all, the Japanese film industry—and perhaps Kurosawa himself—began to suspect that he would never make another film.

==== A difficult decade (1969–1977) ====
Knowing that his reputation was at stake following the much-publicised Tora! Tora! Tora! debacle, Kurosawa moved quickly to a new project to prove he was still viable. To his aid came friends and famed directors Keisuke Kinoshita, Masaki Kobayashi, and Kon Ichikawa, who together with Kurosawa established in July 1969 a production company called the Club of the Four Knights (Yonki no kai). Although the plan was for the four directors to create a film each, it has been suggested that the real motivation for the other three directors was to make it easier for Kurosawa to successfully complete a film and therefore find his way back into the business.

The first project proposed and worked on was a period film to be called Dora-heita, but when this was deemed too expensive, attention shifted to Dodesukaden, an adaptation of yet another Shūgorō Yamamoto work, again about the poor and destitute. The film was shot quickly (by Kurosawa's standards) in about nine weeks, with Kurosawa determined to show he was still capable of working quickly and efficiently within a limited budget. For his first work in color, the dynamic editing and complex compositions of his earlier pictures were set aside, and the artist focused on creating a bold, almost surreal palette of primary colors in order to reveal the toxic environment in which the characters live. It was released in Japan in October 1970, but though a minor critical success, it was greeted with audience indifference. The picture lost money, and the Club of the Four Knights dissolved. Initial reception abroad was somewhat more favorable, but Dodesukaden has since been typically considered an interesting experiment not comparable to the director's best work.

After struggling through the production of Dodesukaden, Kurosawa turned to television work the following year for the only time in his career with Song of the Horse, a documentary about thoroughbred race horses. It featured a voice-over narrated by a fictional man and a child (voiced by the same actors as the beggar and his son in Dodesukaden). It is the only documentary in Kurosawa's filmography; the small crew included his frequent collaborator Masaru Sato, who composed the music. Song of the Horse is also unique in Kurosawa's oeuvre in that it includes an editor's credit, suggesting that it is the only Kurosawa film that he did not cut himself.

Unable to secure funding for further work and allegedly having health problems, Kurosawa apparently reached the breaking point: on December 22, 1971, he slit his wrists and throat multiple times. He survived the suicide attempt, with his health recovering fairly quickly. He subsequently took refuge in domestic life, uncertain if he would ever direct another film.

In early 1973, the Soviet studio Mosfilm approached the film-maker to ask if he would be interested in working with them. Kurosawa proposed adapting Russian explorer Vladimir Arsenyev's autobiographical work Dersu Uzala. The book, about a Goldi hunter who lives in harmony with nature until he is destroyed by encroaching civilization, was one that he had wanted to make since the 1930s. In December 1973, the 63-year-old Kurosawa set off for the Soviet Union with four of his closest aides, beginning a year-and-a-half stay in the country. Shooting began in May 1974 in Siberia, with filming in exceedingly harsh natural conditions proving very difficult and demanding. The picture's production wrapped up in April 1975, with a thoroughly exhausted and homesick Kurosawa returning to Japan and his family in June. Dersu Uzala had its world premiere in Japan on August 2, 1975, and did well at the box office. While critical reception in Japan was muted, the film was better reviewed abroad, winning the Golden Prize at the 9th Moscow International Film Festival, as well as an Academy Award for Best Foreign Language Film. Today, critics remain divided over the film: some see it as an example of Kurosawa's alleged artistic decline, while others count it among his finest works.

Although he received proposals for television projects, he had no interest in working outside the film world. Nevertheless, the hard-drinking director did agree to appear in a series of television ads for Suntory whiskey, which aired in 1976. While fearing that he might never be able to make another film, Kurosawa nevertheless continued working on various projects, writing scripts and creating detailed illustrations, intending to leave behind a visual record of his plans in case he would never be able to film his stories

==== Two epics (1978–1986) ====
In 1977, George Lucas released Star Wars, a wildly successful science fiction film influenced by Kurosawa's The Hidden Fortress. Lucas, like many other New Hollywood directors, revered Kurosawa and considered him a role model, and was shocked to discover that the Japanese filmmaker could not secure financing for any new work. The two met in San Francisco in July 1978 to discuss the project Kurosawa considered most financially viable: Kagemusha, the epic story of a thief hired as the double of a medieval Japanese lord of a great clan. Lucas, enthralled by the screenplay and Kurosawa's illustrations, leveraged his influence over 20th Century Fox to coerce the studio that had fired Kurosawa just ten years earlier to produce Kagemusha, then recruited fellow fan Francis Ford Coppola as co-producer.

Production began the following April, with Kurosawa in high spirits. Shooting lasted from June 1979 through March 1980 and was plagued with problems, not the least of which was the firing of the original lead actor, Shintaro Katsu—known for portraying the popular character Zatoichi—due to an incident in which the actor insisted, against the director's wishes, on videotaping his own performance. (He was replaced by Tatsuya Nakadai, in his first of two consecutive leading roles in a Kurosawa movie.) The film was completed only a few weeks behind schedule and opened in Tokyo in April 1980. It quickly became a massive hit in Japan. The film was also a critical and box office success abroad, winning the coveted Palme d'Or at the 1980 Cannes Film Festival in May, though some critics, then and now, have faulted the film for its alleged coldness. Kurosawa spent much of the rest of the year in Europe and America promoting Kagemusha, collecting awards and accolades, and exhibiting the drawings he had made to serve as storyboards for the film.

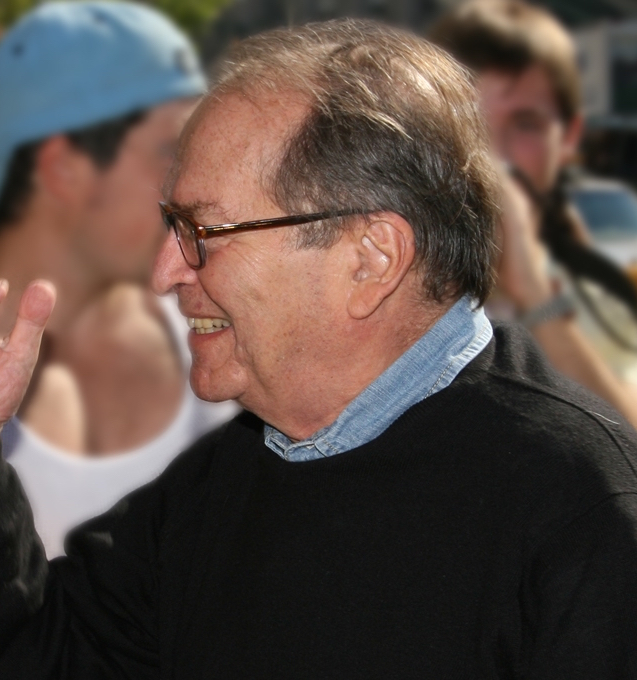
Sidney Lumet (pictured) successfully requested that Kurosawa be nominated as Best Director for his film Ran at the 58th Academy Awards; the award was won by Sydney Pollack.

The international success of Kagemusha allowed Kurosawa to proceed with his next project, Ran, another epic in a similar vein. The script, partly based on Shakespeare's King Lear, depicted a ruthless, bloodthirsty daimyō (warlord), played by Tatsuya Nakadai, who, after foolishly banishing his one loyal son, surrenders his kingdom to his other two sons, who then betray him, thus plunging the entire kingdom into war. As Japanese studios still felt wary about producing another film that would rank among the most expensive ever made in the country, international help was again needed. This time it came from French producer Serge Silberman, who had produced Luis Buñuel's final movies. Filming did not begin until December 1983 and lasted more than a year. In January 1985, production of Ran was halted as Kurosawa's 64-year-old wife Yōko fell ill. She died on February 1. Kurosawa returned to finish his film and Ran premiered at the Tokyo Film Festival on May 31, with a wide release the next day. The film was a moderate financial success in Japan, but a larger one abroad and, as he had done with Kagemusha, Kurosawa embarked on a trip to Europe and America, where he attended the film's premieres in September and October.

Ran won several awards in Japan, but was not quite as honored there as many of the director's best films of the 1950s and 1960s had been. The film world was surprised, however, when Japan passed over the selection of Ran in favor of another film as its official entry to compete for an Oscar nomination in the Best Foreign Film category, which was ultimately rejected for competition at the 58th Academy Awards. Both the producer and Kurosawa himself attributed the failure to even submit Ran for competition to a misunderstanding: because of the academy's arcane rules, no one was sure whether Ran qualified as a Japanese film, a French film (due to its financing), or both, so it was not submitted at all. In response to what at least appeared to be a blatant snub by his own countrymen, the director Sidney Lumet led a successful campaign to have Kurosawa receive an Oscar nomination for Best Director that year (Sydney Pollack ultimately won the award for directing Out of Africa). Ran's costume designer, Emi Wada, won the movie's only Oscar.

Kagemusha and Ran, particularly the latter, are often considered to be among Kurosawa's finest works. After Ran's release, Kurosawa would point to it as his best film, a major change of attitude for the director who, when asked which of his works was his best, had always previously answered "my next one".

==== Final works and last years (1987–1998) ====
For his next movie, Kurosawa chose a subject very different from any he had ever filmed. While some of his previous pictures (for example, Drunken Angel and Kagemusha) had included brief dream sequences, Dreams was to be entirely based upon the director's own dreams. Significantly, for the first time in over forty years, Kurosawa, for this deeply personal project, wrote the screenplay alone. Although its estimated budget was lower than the films immediately preceding it, Japanese studios were still unwilling to back one of his productions, so Kurosawa turned to another famous American fan, Steven Spielberg, who convinced Warner Bros. to buy the international rights to the completed film. This made it easier for Kurosawa's son, Hisao, as co-producer and soon-to-be head of Kurosawa Production, to negotiate a loan in Japan that would cover the film's production costs. Shooting took more than eight months to complete, and Dreams premiered at Cannes in May 1990 to a polite but muted reception, similar to the reaction the picture would generate elsewhere in the world. In 1990, he accepted the Academy Award for Lifetime Achievement. In his acceptance speech, he famously said "I'm a little worried because I don't feel that I understand cinema yet." At the time, Bob Thomas of The Daily Spectrum noted that Kurosawa was "considered by many critics as the greatest living filmmaker."

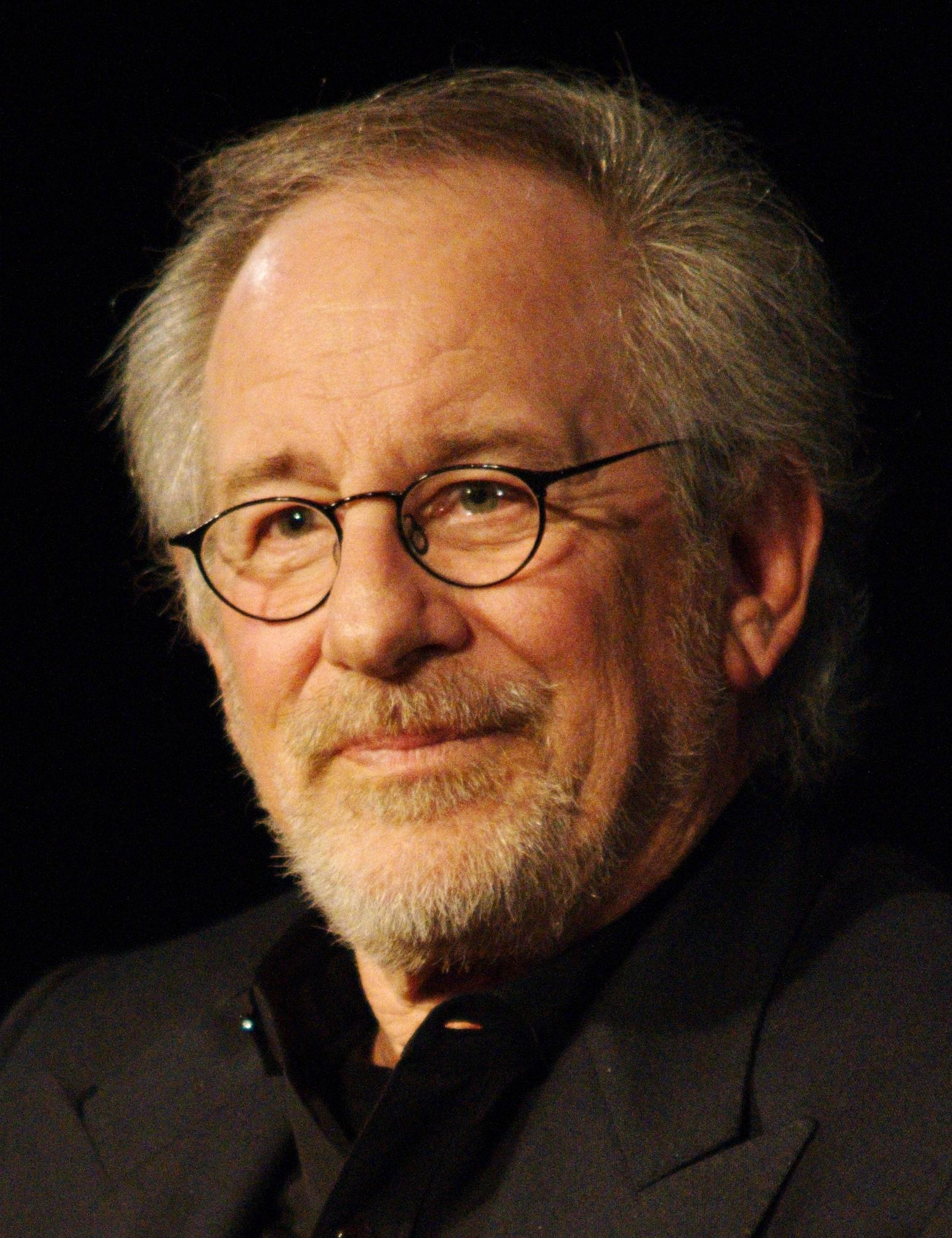
Steven Spielberg, pictured here at the Cinémathèque Française in 2012, helped finance the production of several of Kurosawa's final films.

Kurosawa now turned to a more conventional story with Rhapsody in August—the director's first film fully produced in Japan since Dodeskaden over twenty years before—which explored the scars of the nuclear bombing which destroyed Nagasaki at the very end of World War II. It was adapted from a Kiyoko Murata novel, but the film's references to the Nagasaki bombing came from the director rather than from the book. This was his only movie to include a role for an American movie star: Richard Gere, who plays a small role as the nephew of the elderly heroine. Shooting took place in early 1991, with the film opening on May 25 that year to a largely negative critical reaction, especially in the United States, where the director was accused of promulgating naïvely anti-American sentiments, though Kurosawa rejected these accusations.

Kurosawa wasted no time moving onto his next project: Madadayo, or Not Yet. Based on autobiographical essays by Hyakken Uchida, the film follows the life of a Japanese professor of German through the Second World War and beyond. The narrative centers on yearly birthday celebrations with his former students, during which the protagonist declares his unwillingness to die just yet—a theme that was becoming increasingly relevant for the film's 81-year-old creator. Filming began in February 1992 and wrapped up by the end of September. Its release on April 17, 1993, was greeted by an even more disappointed reaction than had been the case with his two preceding works.

Kurosawa nevertheless continued to work. He wrote the original screenplays The Sea Is Watching in 1993 and After the Rain in 1995. While putting finishing touches on the latter in 1995, he slipped and broke the base of his spine. Following this, he used a wheelchair for the rest of his life, putting an end to any hopes of him directing another film. His longtime wish to die on the set while shooting a film would never be fulfilled. After his accident, his health began to deteriorate. His mind remained sharp and lively but his body was giving up, and he spent the final six months of his life largely confined to bed at home, where he listened to music and watched television. On September 6, 1998, at the age of 88, he died of a stroke in Tokyo's Setagaya ward.

At the time of his death, Kurosawa had two children: a son named Hisao, who became a producer and married singer Hiroko Hayashi, and a daughter named Kazuko, who became a costume designer and married Harayuki Kato. Kurosawa was survived by his children and several grandchildren. One of Kazuko's children, Takayuki Kato, later became an actor and had supporting roles in two films posthumously developed from screenplays written by Kurosawa: Takashi Koizumi's After the Rain (1999) and Kei Kumai's The Sea is Watching (2002).

== Style, themes and techniques ==
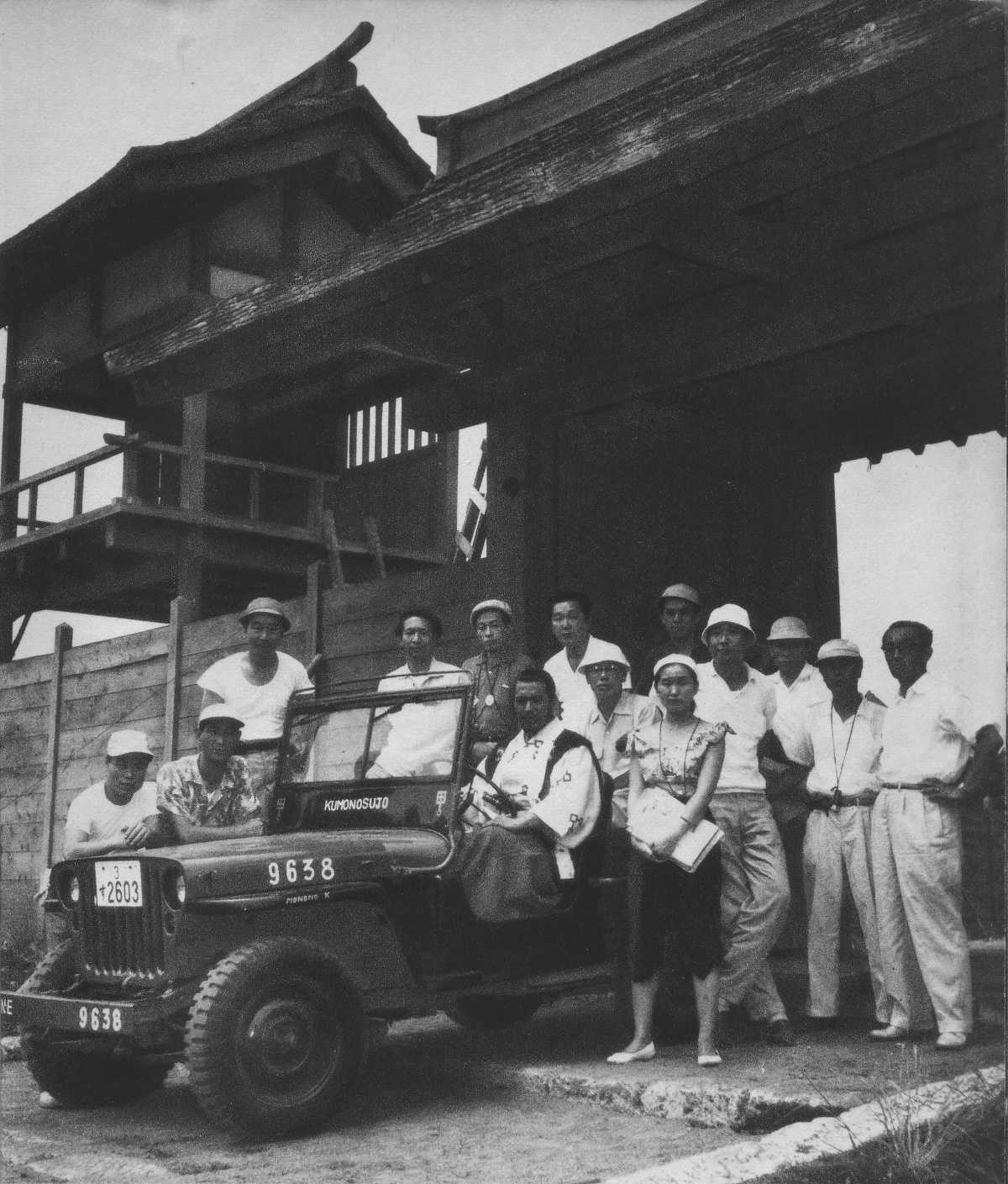
Throne of Blood cast and crew photo taken in 1956, showing (from left to right) Shinjin Akiike, Fumio Yanoguchi, Kuichiro Kishida, Samaji Nonagase, Takao Saito, Toshiro Mifune (in the jeep), Minoru Chiaki, Takashi Shimura, Teruyo Nogami, Yoshirō Muraki, Akira Kurosawa, Hiroshi Nezu, Asakazu Nakai, and Sōjirō Motoki

Kurosawa displayed a bold and dynamic style, strongly influenced by Western cinema yet distinct from it; he was involved with all aspects of production as a writer, director, producer, and editor. He was a gifted screenwriter and worked closely with his co-writers from a film's development onward to ensure a high-quality script, which he considered the firm foundation of a good film. He also frequently edited his own films. His team of frequent collaborators, known as the "Kurosawa-gumi" (黒澤組; Kurosawa group), included actor Takashi Shimura, cinematographer Asakazu Nakai, and production assistant Teruyo Nogami

Kurosawa's style is marked by a number of devices and techniques. In his films of the 1940s and 1950s, he frequently employs the "axial cut", in which the camera moves toward or away from the subject through a series of matched jump cuts rather than tracking shots or dissolves. Another stylistic trait is "cut on motion", which displays the motion on the screen in two or more shots instead of one uninterrupted one. A form of cinematic punctuation strongly identified with Kurosawa is the wipe, an effect created through an optical printer: a line or bar appears to move across the screen, wiping away the end of a scene and revealing the first image of the next. As a transitional device, it is used as a substitute for the straight cut or the dissolve; in his mature work, the wipe became Kurosawa's signature.

In the film's soundtrack, Kurosawa favored the sound-image counterpoint, in which the music or sound effects appeared to comment ironically on the image rather than emphasizing it. Teruyo Nogami's memoir gives several such examples from Drunken Angel and Stray Dog. Kurosawa was also involved with several of Japan's outstanding contemporary composers, including Fumio Hayasaka and Tōru Takemitsu.

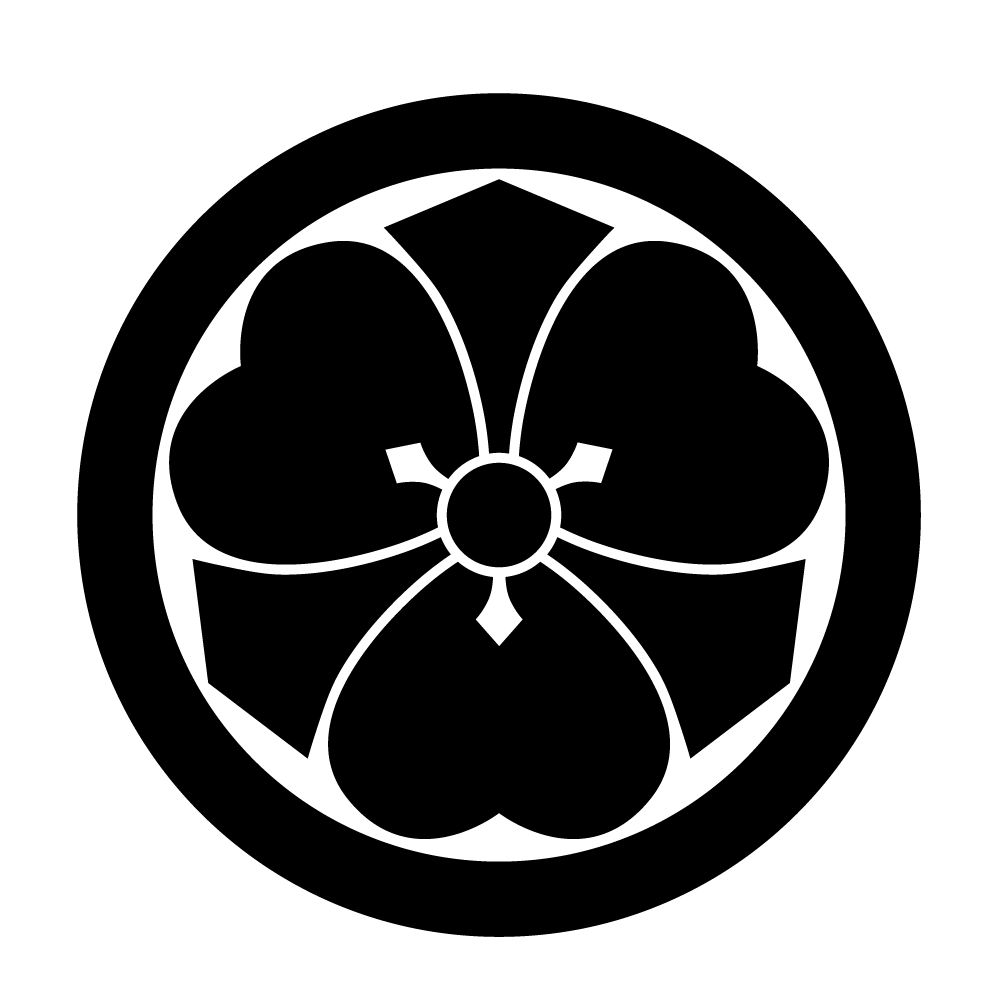
Kurosawa's kamon, used by several of his characters as their mon-tsuki

Kurosawa employed a number of recurring themes in his films: the master-disciple relationship between a usually older mentor and one or more novices, which often involves spiritual as well as technical mastery and self-mastery; the heroic champion, the exceptional individual who emerges from the mass of people to produce something or right some wrong; the depiction of extremes of weather as both dramatic devices and symbols of human passion; and the recurrence of cycles of savage violence within history. According to Stephen Prince, the last theme, which he calls, "the countertradition to the committed, heroic mode of Kurosawa's cinema," began with Throne of Blood (1957) and recurred in the films of the 1980s.

== Legacy and cultural impact ==
Kurosawa is often cited as one of the greatest filmmakers of all time. In 1999, he was named "Asian of the Century" in the "Arts, Literature, and Culture" category by AsianWeek magazine and CNN, cited as "one of the [five] people who contributed most to the betterment of Asia in the past 100 years". Kurosawa was ranked third in the directors' poll and fifth in the critics' poll in Sight & Sound's 2002 list of the greatest directors of all time. In commemoration of the 100th anniversary of Kurosawa's birth in 2010, a project called AK100 was launched in 2008. The AK100 Project aims to "expose young people who are the representatives of the next generation, and all people everywhere, to the light and spirit of Akira Kurosawa and the wonderful world he created".

=== Reputation among filmmakers ===
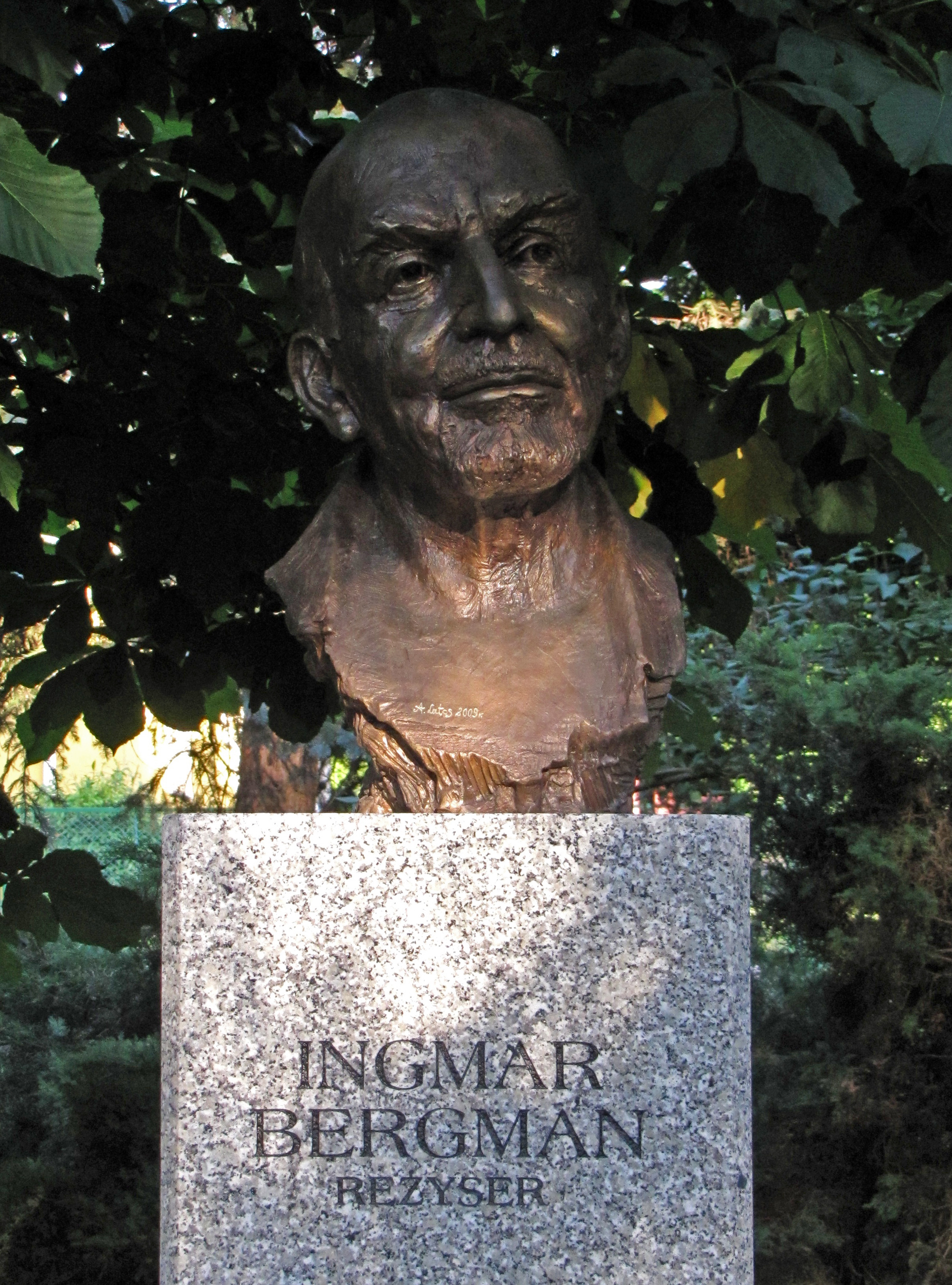
Ingmar Bergman, shown here in a bust located in Kielce, Poland, was an admirer of Kurosawa's work.

Many filmmakers have been influenced by Kurosawa's work. Ingmar Bergman called his own film The Virgin Spring a "touristic... lousy imitation of Kurosawa" and added, "At that time my admiration for the Japanese cinema was at its height. I was almost a samurai myself!" Federico Fellini considered Kurosawa to be "the greatest living example of all that an author of the cinema should be". Steven Spielberg cited Kurosawa's cinematic vision as shaping his own. Satyajit Ray, who was posthumously awarded the Akira Kurosawa Award for Lifetime Achievement in Directing at the San Francisco International Film Festival in 1992, had said earlier of Rashomon:

The effect of the film on me [upon first seeing it in Calcutta in 1952] was electric. I saw it three times on consecutive days and wondered each time if there was another film anywhere which gave such sustained and dazzling proof of a director's command over every aspect of film making.

Roman Polanski considered Kurosawa to be among the three film-makers he favored most, along with Fellini and Orson Welles, and picked Seven Samurai, Throne of Blood, and The Hidden Fortress for praise. Bernardo Bertolucci considered Kurosawa's influence to be seminal: "Kurosawa's movies and La Dolce Vita of Fellini are the things that pushed me, sucked me into being a film director." Andrei Tarkovsky cited Kurosawa as one of his favorites and named Seven Samurai as one of his ten favorite films. Sidney Lumet called Kurosawa the "Beethoven of movie directors". Werner Herzog reflected on film-makers with whom he feels kinship and the movies that he admires:

Griffith – especially his Birth of a Nation and Broken Blossoms – Murnau, Buñuel, Kurosawa and Eisenstein's Ivan the Terrible, ... all come to mind. ... I like Dreyer's The Passion of Joan of Arc, Pudovkin's Storm Over Asia and Dovzhenko's Earth, ... Mizoguchi's Ugetsu Monogatari, Satyajit Ray's The Music Room ... I have always wondered how Kurosawa made something as good as Rashomon; the equilibrium and flow are perfect, and he uses space in such a well-balanced way. It is one of the best films ever made.

According to an assistant, Stanley Kubrick considered Kurosawa to be "one of the great film directors" and spoke of him "consistently and admiringly", to the point that a letter from him "meant more than any Oscar" and caused him to agonize for months over drafting a reply. Robert Altman claimed that, upon first seeing Rashomon, he was so impressed by the sequence of frames of the sun that he began to shoot the same sequences in his work the very next day. George Lucas cited The Hidden Fortress as one of his major inspirations for Star Wars. He also cited other films of Kurosawa as his favorites including Seven Samurai, Yojimbo, and Ikiru. He also said, "I had never seen anything that powerful or cinematographic. The emotions were so strong that it didn't matter that I did not understand the culture or the traditions. From that moment on, Kurosawa's films have served as one of my strongest sources of creative inspiration." Wes Anderson's animated film Isle of Dogs is partially inspired by Kurosawa's filming techniques. At the 64th Sydney Film Festival, there was a retrospective of Akira Kurosawa where films of his were screened to remember the great legacy he has created from his work. Zack Snyder cited him as one of his influences for his Netflix film Rebel Moon.

=== Criticism ===
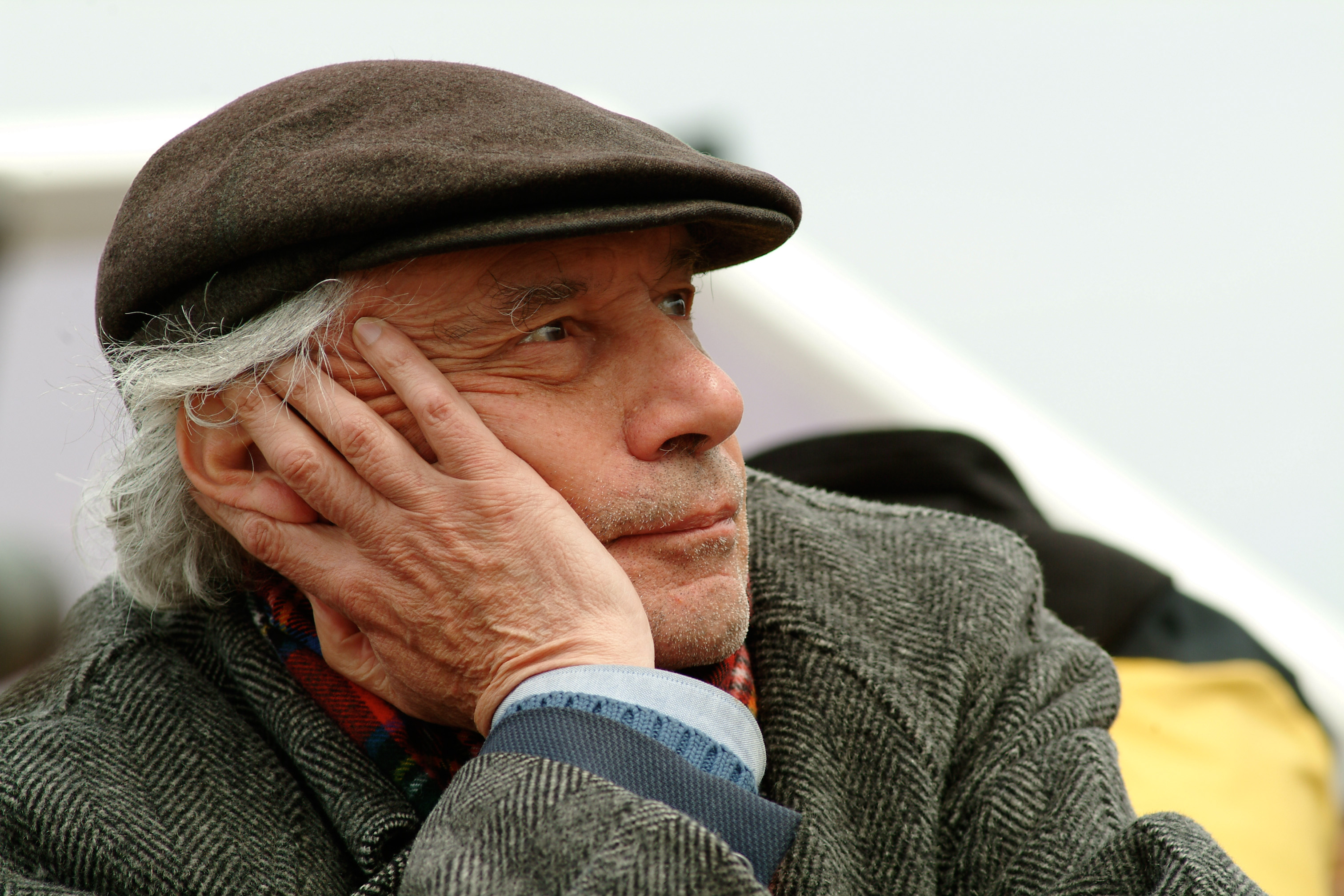
Jacques Rivette, a prominent critic of the French New Wave who assessed Mizoguchi's work to be more wholly Japanese in comparison to Kurosawa's

Kenji Mizoguchi, the acclaimed director of Ugetsu (1953) and Sansho the Bailiff (1954), was eleven years Kurosawa's senior. After the mid-1950s, some critics of the French New Wave began to favor Mizoguchi over Kurosawa. New Wave critic and film-maker Jacques Rivette, in particular, thought Mizoguchi to be the only Japanese director whose work was at once entirely Japanese and truly universal; Kurosawa, by contrast, was thought to be more influenced by Western cinema and culture, a view that has been disputed.

In Japan, some critics and filmmakers considered Kurosawa to be elitist. They viewed him to center his effort and attention on exceptional or heroic characters. In her DVD commentary on Seven Samurai, Joan Mellen argued that certain shots of the samurai characters Kambei and Kyuzo, which show Kurosawa to have accorded higher status or validity to them, constitutes evidence for this point of view. These Japanese critics argued that Kurosawa was not sufficiently progressive because the peasants were unable to find leaders from within their ranks. In an interview with Mellen, Kurosawa defended himself, saying,

I wanted to say that after everything the peasants were the stronger, closely clinging to the earth ... It was the samurai who were weak because they were being blown by the winds of time.

From the early 1950s, Kurosawa was also charged with catering to Western tastes due to his popularity in Europe and America. In the 1970s, the politically engaged, left-wing director Nagisa Ōshima, who was noted for his critical reaction to Kurosawa's work, accused Kurosawa of pandering to Western beliefs and ideologies. Author Audie Bock, however, assessed Kurosawa to have never played up to a non-Japanese viewing public and to have denounced those directors who did.

=== Posthumous screenplays ===
Following Kurosawa's death, several posthumous works based on his unfilmed screenplays have been produced. After the Rain, directed by Takashi Koizumi, was released in 1999, and The Sea Is Watching, directed by Kei Kumai, premiered in 2002. A script created by the Yonki no Kai ("Club of the Four Knights") (Kurosawa, Keisuke Kinoshita, Masaki Kobayashi, and Kon Ichikawa), around the time that Dodeskaden was made, finally was filmed and released (in 2000) as Dora-heita, by the only surviving founding member of the club, Kon Ichikawa. Huayi Brothers Media and CKF Pictures in China announced in 2017 plans to produce a film of Kurosawa's posthumous screenplay of The Masque of the Red Death by Edgar Allan Poe for 2020, to be entitled The Mask of the Black Death. Patrick Frater writing for Variety magazine in May 2017 stated that another two unfinished films by Kurosawa were planned, with Silvering Spear to start filming in 2018.

=== Kurosawa Production Company ===
In September 2011, it was reported that remake rights to most of Kurosawa's movies and unproduced screenplays were assigned by the Akira Kurosawa 100 Project to the L.A.-based company Splendent. Splendent's chief Sakiko Yamada, stated that he aimed to "help contemporary film-makers introduce a new generation of moviegoers to these unforgettable stories".

Kurosawa Production Co., established in 1959, continues to oversee many of the aspects of Kurosawa's legacy. The director's son, Hisao Kurosawa, is the current head of the company. Its American subsidiary, Kurosawa Enterprises, is located in Los Angeles. Rights to Kurosawa's works were then held by Kurosawa Production and the film studios under which he worked, most notably Toho. These rights were then assigned to the Akira Kurosawa 100 Project before being reassigned in 2011 to the L.A. based company Splendent. Kurosawa Production works closely with the Akira Kurosawa Foundation, established in December 2003 and also run by Hisao Kurosawa. The foundation organizes an annual short film competition and spearheads Kurosawa-related projects, including a recently shelved one to build a memorial museum for the director.

=== Film studios ===
In 1981, the Kurosawa Film Studio was opened in Yokohama; two additional locations have since been launched in Japan. A large collection of archive material, including scanned screenplays, photos and news articles, has been made available through the Akira Kurosawa Digital Archive, a Japanese proprietary website maintained by Ryukoku University Digital Archives Research Center in collaboration with Kurosawa Production.

==== Anaheim University Akira Kurosawa School of Film ====
Anaheim University in collaboration with Kurosawa Production and the Kurosawa family established the Anaheim University Akira Kurosawa School of Film in spring 2009. The Anaheim University Akira Kurosawa School of Film offers an Online Master of Fine Arts (MFA) in Digital Filmmaking supported by many of the world's greatest filmmakers.

=== Kurosawa Restaurant Group ===
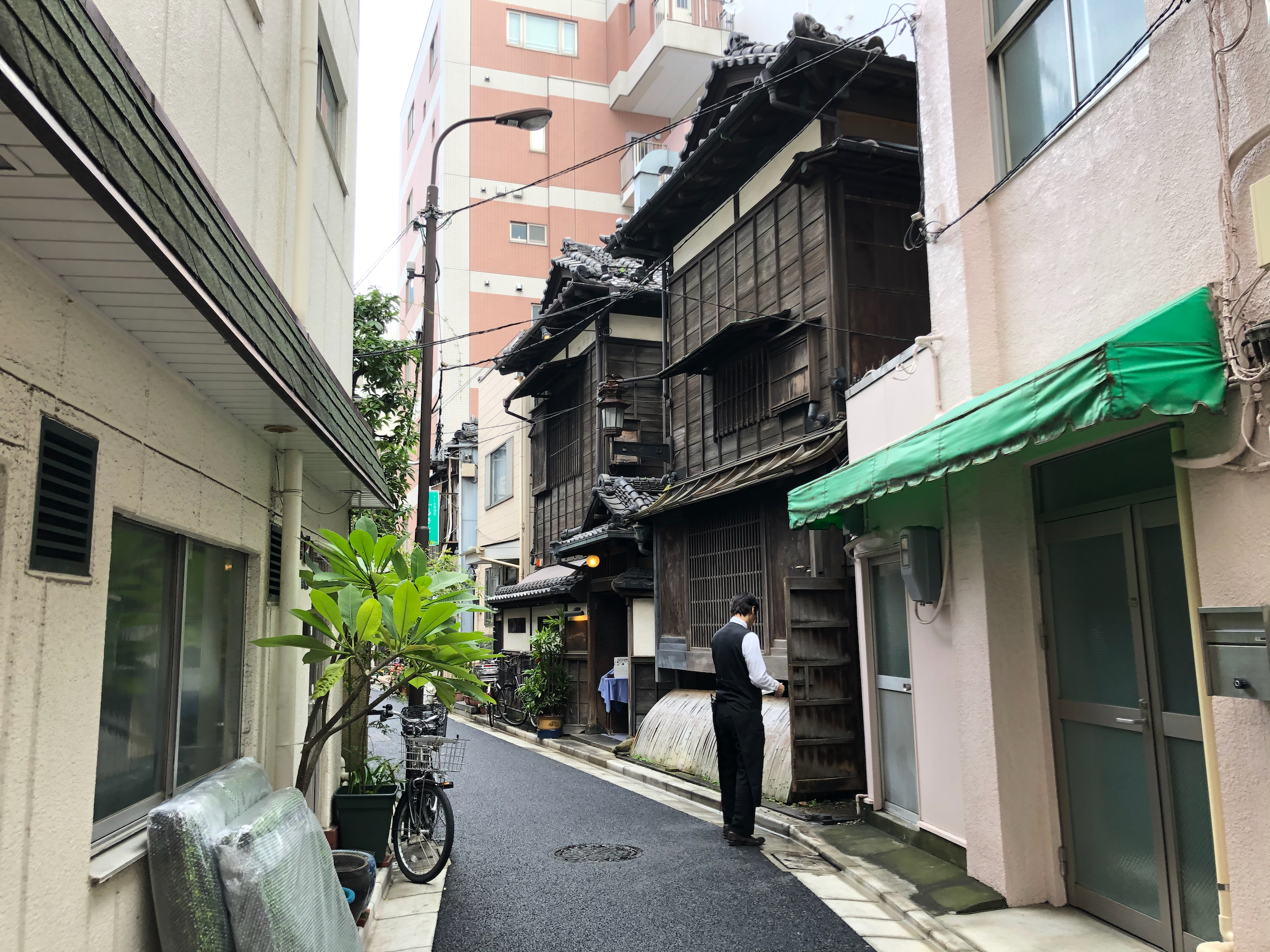
Teppanyaki Kurosawa restaurant is tucked away down a small side street in Tsukiji, Tokyo.

Kurosawa was known to be a connoisseur of Japanese cuisine and as such, the Kurosawa family foundation established the Kurosawa Restaurant Group after his death in 1999, opening four restaurants in the Tokyo area bearing the family name. Nagatacho Kurosawa specializing in Shabu-shabu, Teppanyaki Kurosawa in Tsukiji specializing in Teppanyaki, Keyaki Kurosawa in Nishi-Azabu specializing in soba, and Udon Kurosawa specializing in udon in Roppongi. All four locations were designed to evoke the Meiji era machiya of Kurosawa's youth and feature memorabilia of Kurosawa's career. As of 2023, only the Tsukiji location is currently still operating. A number of entrepreneurs around the world have also opened restaurants and businesses in honor of Kurosawa without any connection to Akira or the estate.

== Filmography ==
The complete list of Kurosawa's works includes his films in addition to his work in television, theater, and literature.

== Documentaries ==
A significant number of short and full-length documentaries concerning the life and work of Kurosawa were made both during his artistic heyday and after his death. AK, by French video essay director Chris Marker, was filmed while Kurosawa was working on Ran; however, the documentary is more concerned about Kurosawa's distant yet polite personality than on the making of the film. Other documentaries concerning Kurosawa's life and works produced posthumously include:

- Kurosawa: The Last Emperor (Alex Cox, 1999)
- A Message from Akira Kurosawa: For Beautiful Movies (Hisao Kurosawa, 2000)
- Kurosawa (Adam Low, 2001)
- Akira Kurosawa: It Is Wonderful to Create (Toho Masterworks, 2002)
- Akira Kurosawa: The Epic and the Intimate (2010)
- Kurosawa's Way (Catherine Cadou, 2011)
- Life Work of Akira Kurosawa (Mitsuhiko Kawamura, 2023)
- Searching For Kurosawa (Richard Rowland, 2025)

== Awards and honours ==
Two film awards have also been named in Kurosawa's honour. The Akira Kurosawa Award for Lifetime Achievement in Film Directing is awarded during the San Francisco International Film Festival, while the Akira Kurosawa Award is given during the Tokyo International Film Festival.

Kurosawa has also been given a number of state honours, including being named as an officer of the French Légion d'honneur in 1984 and a Knight Grand Cross of the Order of Merit of the Italian Republic in 1986, and he was the first filmmaker to receive the Order of Culture from his native Japan in 1985. Posthumously, he was recognized with the Junior Third Court Rank, which would be the modern equivalent of a noble title under the Kazoku aristocracy.

== See also ==
- List of Academy Award winners and nominees of Asian descent
- List of Academy Award winners and nominees from Japan
- List of oldest and youngest Academy Award winners and nominees — Oldest winners for Best Director
