= Asian of the Century =

1999 award declared by AsianWeek and CNN

Asian of the Century was a centurial issue of the 20th century held by the American magazine AsianWeek and CNN in 1999 that features and profiles Asian persons who have topped their respective fields. Those people featured are considered as "The person who contributed most to the betterment of Asia in the past 100 years'". Mahatma Gandhi was declared as the "Asian of the Century".

== The Big Five ==
The Big Five are:

- Politics and Government: Deng Xiaoping (China)
- Business and Economics: Akio Morita (Japan)
- Arts, Literature and Culture: Akira Kurosawa (Japan)
- Science and Technology: Charles K. Kao (China/UK/USA)
- Moral and Spiritual Leadership: Mahatma Gandhi (India)

== Contenders ==
There was a long list of runners-up, such as Rabindranath Tagore (1861–1941), Bruce Lee (1940–1973), Chang Min Chueh (1919–1991), M. S. Swaminathan, Rodolfo Aquino, Goh Keng Swee, Li Kuo-ting, Muhammad Yunus, Mother Teresa (1910–1997), the 14th Dalai Lama, Mohammad Ali Jinnah (1876–1948), Mahathir Mohamad, Mao Zedong (1893–1976), Corazon Aquino, and Lee Kuan Yew.

== See also ==
- Time Person of the Year
- Time 100: The Most Important People of the Century
- Canadian Newsmaker of the Year
