= The Most Beautiful =

1944 Japanese film by Akira Kurosawa

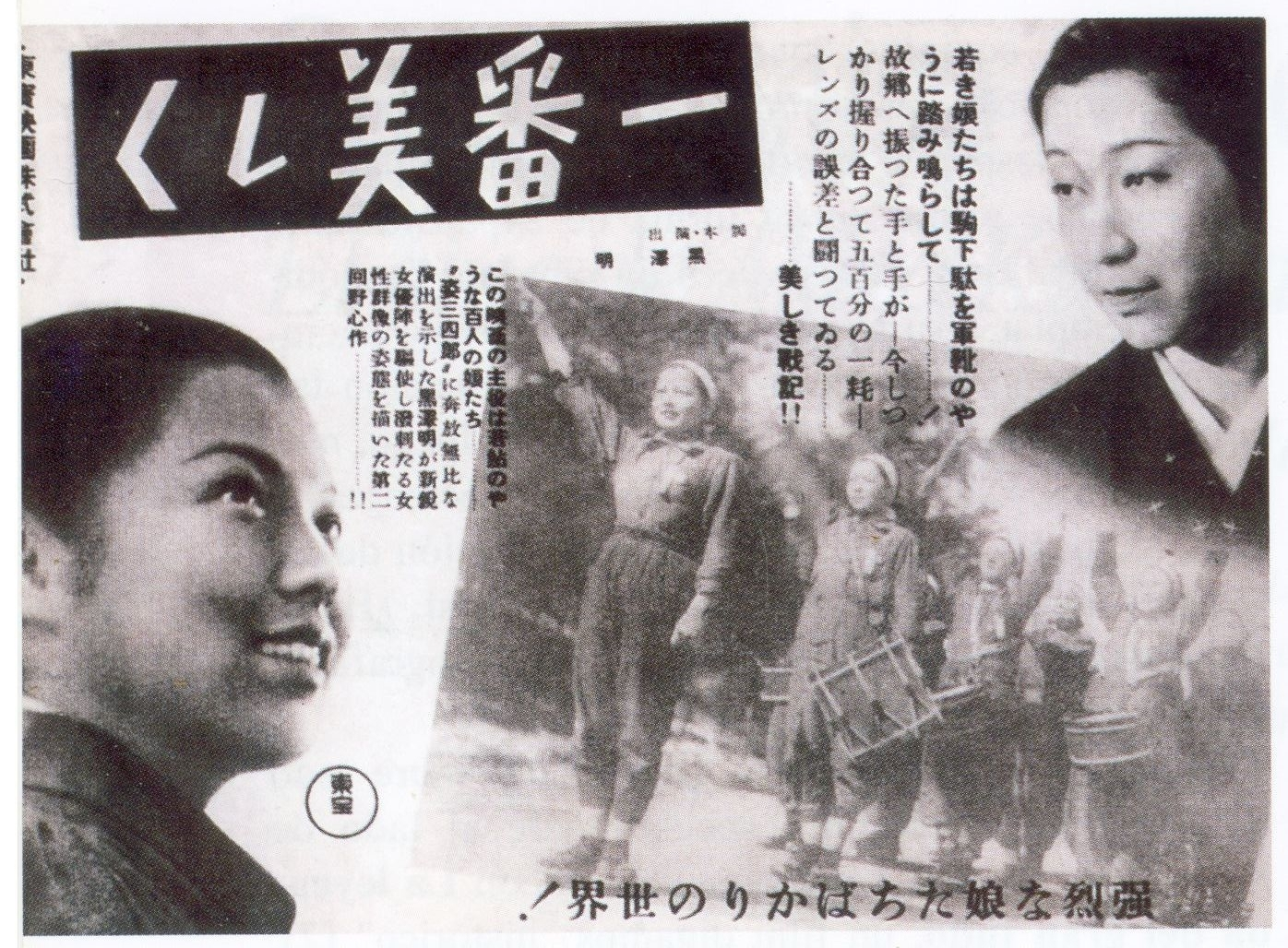
- Theatrical release poster
- Directed by: Akira Kurosawa
- Screenplay by: Akira Kurosawa
- Produced by: Motohiko Ito; Jin Usami
- Starring: Takashi Shimura; Yoko Yaguchi; Ichiro Sugai; Takako Irie
- Cinematography: Joji Ohara
- Edited by: Yoshie Yaguchi
- Music by: Sei'ichi Suzuki
- Production company: Toho Studios
- Distributed by: Toho Company
- Release date: April 13, 1944
- Running time: 85 minutes
- Country: Japan
- Language: Japanese

The Most Beautiful (Japanese: 一番美しく, Hepburn: Ichiban Utsukushiku) is a 1944 Japanese drama and propaganda film written and directed by Akira Kurosawa. The semidocumentary film follows a group of female volunteer workers at an optics factory during the Second World War, during which the film was produced.

== Plot ==
Set during World War II, the film depicts the struggle of female volunteer workers to meet production targets at a precision optics factory in Hiratsuka. They drive themselves, individually and collectively, to exceed the targets set for them by the factory directors. The factory directors push them to be their best for their country.

They live in a dormitory, under the leadership of Watanabe. Every day, they all march and sing songs about Japan's greatness while on the way to their work. They live away from their parents but are happy to do so in order to serve their country. Every morning before work, they pledge that they will be loyal to Japan and will work to destroy the U.S.A. and Britain. Encouraging signs are posted everywhere about working hard for one's country in the factory.

One of the young women becomes ill and has to return home, and is upset about missing work; she cries because of the tremendous guilt she feels. She begs not to be sent home because she wants to keep working. Later on, a girl falls off the roof and gets badly injured, yet she says she is delighted that she did not harm her hands and will come to work on crutches.

The young women become tired and their productivity decreases. They know their reputation is at stake, and they must work harder. One of them says that "one can't improve productivity without improving one's character." Watanabe's mother becomes ill, but her father writes that under no circumstance should she come home, and her mother wants her to keep working, saying that her job is too important to leave. One of the young women gets a high temperature and tries to ignore it because she does not want to get sent home or stop working.

Watanabe accidentally misplaces an uncalibrated lens and spends the entire night looking for it, worried her mistake will cost a soldier their life. The film ends with Watanabe's mother dying and her father telling her to stay at work. The factory directors ask her to go home. She refuses to go and cries while continuing her work.

== Cast ==
- Takashi Shimura as Chief Goro Ishida
- Soji Kiyokawa as Soichi Yoshikawa
- Ichiro Sugai as Ken Sanada
- Takako Irie as Noriko Mizushima
- Sayuri Tanima as Yuriko Tanimura
- Sachiko Ozaki as Sachiko Yamazaki
- Asako Suzuki as Asako Suzumura
- Haruko Toyama as Masako Koyama
- Yoko Yaguchi as Tsuru Watanabe

== Production ==
According to Stephen Prince, Akira Kurosawa had been chosen by the navy to direct an action film about Zero fighter planes, but by 1943 he thought it unlikely that the navy would spare planes for a film as it was becoming clear that Japan would lose the war. Instead Kurosawa made this "patriotic morale booster". The director shot The Most Beautiful with a "semidocumentary approach." It was filmed on-location at the Nippon Kogaku factory in Hiratsuka, where he had the actresses live, work, and form a fife and drum corps.

Actress Yoko Yaguchi clashed over the alleged ways Kurosawa treated the actors. However, the pair found a connection, despite these clashes, and married in 1945. Although Prince writes that Kurosawa later chastised himself for doing so little to resist Japan's descent into militarism, the director also remarked that, of all his films, The Most Beautiful was dearest to him.

== Reissues ==
The Criterion Collection has released The Most Beautiful on DVD in North America as part of two Kurosawa box sets; 2009's AK 100: 25 Films by Akira Kurosawa, and 2010's The First Films of Akira Kurosawa, the 23rd entry in their Eclipse series.

== Critical reception ==
Paul Anderer of Columbia University has commented on the subtext of the film having been released during the war years for Japan. Anderer said, "It is as if Kurosawa himself were in this lineup (of directors under state scrutiny), frozen inside wartime, when any significant movement or resistance to the authority would be stillborn. Surrounded by a censorship apparatus far more resourceful and intimidating, he would later claim, than anything the American Occupation threw his way, he had few thematic or tonal options: historical tributes to Japanese spiritual and martial values (like Sanshiro Sugata and its weaker sequel), or patriotic odes to factory production and sacrificial domesticity (e.g., The Most Beautiful, 1944)".

Critics like Stephen Prince, Kurosawa translator Audie Bock, and historian David Conrad have argued that what is most striking about The Most Beautiful and Kurosawa's other wartime productions is the extent to which they complicate and even undercut the government's desired message. The Most Beautiful "dutifully praises sacrifice but shrouds it in an air of futility" by focusing on "the individual emotional costs of war."
