= Yōko Yaguchi =

Japanese actress (1921–1985)

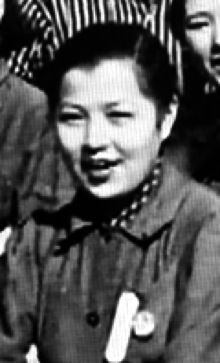
- Yaguchi on the set of The Most Beautiful
- Born: Kiyo Katō; August 27, 1921; British Hong Kong
- Died: February 1, 1985 (aged 63); Fukuoka, Japan
- Spouse: Akira Kurosawa (m. 1945)
- Children: Kazuko Kurosawa; Hisao Kurosawa

Yōko Yaguchi (矢口 陽子, Yaguchi Yōko; born Kiyo Katō, August 27, 1921 in British Hong Kong – February 1, 1985 in Fukuoka) was a Japanese actress, and the wife of Japanese filmmaker Akira Kurosawa for 39 years. She had two children with Kurosawa: a son named Hisao and a daughter named Kazuko.

== Personal life ==
While working on Akira Kurosawa's second film, The Most Beautiful, Yaguchi clashed over the alleged ways the director treated the actors. However, the pair found a connection, despite these clashes, and married in 1945. Their son Hisao was born that same year. Yaguchi never returned to acting after her marriage to Akira Kurosawa, effectively ending her film career.

== Partial filmography ==
- Renga joko (1940)
- Enoken no songokū: songokū zenko-hen (Enoken's Sun Wukong) (1940)
- Jogakusei-ki (1941)
- The Most Beautiful (1944)
