= Tsubasa no gaika =

- Directed by: Satsuo Yamamoto
- Written by: Akira Kurosawa; Bonhei Sotoyama
- Produced by: Sanezumi Fujimoto
- Cinematography: Taiichi Kankura
- Production company: Toho
- Distributed by: Toho
- Release date: 14 October 1942 (Japan)
- Running time: 109 minutes
- Country: Japan
- Language: Japanese

Tsubasa no gaika (翼の凱歌; English titles Winged Victory or A Triumph of Wings) is a 1942 Japanese film directed by Satsuo Yamamoto. It was co-written by Akira Kurosawa.

== Cast ==
- Joji Oka
- Takako Irie
- Ranko Hanai
- Heihachiro Okawa
- Seizaburō Kawazu
- Takuzō Kumagai
- Akio Kusama
