= Takenoko seikatsu (Bamboo-shoot living) =

Japanese term for selling luxuries to buy essentials

Takenoko seikatsu (竹の子生活・筍生活）, translated as "bamboo-shoot life/existence", is a Japanese phrase which refers to the selling or bartering of one's goods such as clothing and other expensive items such as jewellery for food and essentials in order to live. The phrase comes from the image of someone selling layers of clothing being likened to the peeling back the layers of bamboo skin one by one. Some instead referred to the practice as tamanegi seikatsu (onion existence), implying that one would cry when parting with their valuable personal items. Bamboo-shoot life is especially associated with clothing, with some of the more valuable household goods someone could barter for at the time being their precious silk kimonos. This was especially poignant in the postwar as sartorial frugality had been strongly encouraged during the war, especially for women who had turned to wearing monpe as an alternative to kimono. Restrictions on new clothing continued after the war ended, with textile rationing and clothing coupons still in use until 1951.

Takenoko seikatsu became a common occurrence, especially in the immediate aftermath of the Asia-Pacific War in Japan (1937-1945) due to food insecurity caused in part by a large number of evacuees and an increasing population. The economy continued to be strained and inflation sharply rose - for example, wholesale prices increased by 364% in 1946.

== Food insecurity in wartime Japan ==
Historians have argued that the levels of malnourishment and starvation towards the end of the war, both for the military and civilian population, was one of if not the key reason Japan surrendered on August 15, 1945. The level of food insecurity in the immediate postwar period remained high for at least a year after the war ended, with families in Tokyo reportedly only receiving half of their food rations in 1946. This included rice, which the government continued to have a strong control over - see also Food in the Occupation of Japan. Therefore, during this time, black markets or yami-ichi, emerged across urban Japan with some stating they were on every street corner and are credited with supporting the reconstruction of postwar Japan. However, some urban residents instead of depending on trading at black markets and paying extortionate prices for staple foods such as rice, decided to instead travel to the countryside to trade goods directly with farmers. It has also been argued by historians that the phenomenon is linked to bamboo shoots because during the immediate postwar bamboo shoot skins were one of the foods exchanged.

It wasn't until 1955 when the economy recovered and slowly returned Japanese industries to prewar levels again and Japan saw unprecedented economic prosperity, ultimately leading to the Japanese economic miracle from the mid 1950s to 1970s.

Postwar living conditions and the need for resources and living essentials were exacerbated by the large-scale strategic and area bombing operations targeted on densely populated cities across Japan, but particularly Tokyo, by the US airforce during the summer of 1945. The fire-bombing of Tokyo in 1945 for instance resulted in the death of at least 100,000 residents more wounded, and over a million displaced with their homes and belongings destroyed.
