= War and Peace (1947 film) =

1947 Japanese film

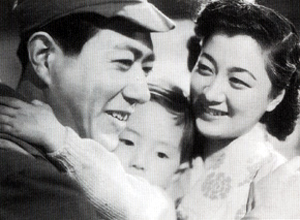
- Directed by: Fumio Kamei; Satsuo Yamamoto
- Written by: Toshio Yasumi
- Produced by: Takero Ito
- Starring: Ryo Ikebe; Hatae Kishi; Hajime Izu
- Cinematography: Yoshio Miyajima
- Music by: Nobuo Iida
- Production company: Toho
- Release date: 22 July 1947 (Japan)
- Running time: 100 minutes
- Country: Japan
- Language: Japanese

War and Peace (Japanese: 戰爭と平和, Hepburn: Sensō to heiwa), also translated as Between War and Peace, is a 1947 drama film co-directed by Fumio Kamei and Satsuo Yamamoto. It was based on the 1911 film Enoch Arden directed by D.W. Griffith.

The film was criticized as a vehicle for "Communist propaganda lines" when submitted to the Civil Censorship Department, and several sequences were cut from the film.

== Plot ==
During the Pacific War, Kenichi is reported dead after his transport ship sinks under enemy attack off China, but he has really drifted away from the wreck and been rescued by fishermen. When he is repatriated and returns to Tokyo after the end of the war, he discovers that his wife Machiko has married his friend Yasukichi.

== Production ==
War and Peace was among several films produced after two labor disputes at Toho, which resulted in the employees' union gaining representation at company production meetings. Fumio Kamei, a strike leader, suggested producing War and Peace to commemorate Constitution Day. Films promoting the ideals of the new Japanese Constitution were officially encouraged by the government at the insistence of the Supreme Commander for the Allied Powers. Kamei had no experience in directing narrative film, and was assigned to co-direct with Satsuo Yamamoto. The final film contains a mix of drama and actuality. As with other productions filmed in Tokyo, the crew had been ordered to avoid any depiction of the American presence in the city, including soldiers, jeeps, and English-language signs.

The film was supported and approved by the Civil Information and Education Section, but came under heavy criticism when submitted to the Civil Censorship Department for promoting "Communist propaganda lines". Censors excised scenes they considered critical of the Occupation government or of Americans, including scenes of demonstrators carrying banners reading "Freedom of speech" and "Let those who work eat," which were considered critical of Occupation policy; and scenes involving violent strikebreakers were cut for linking right-wing strikebreakers to ultranationalists, and their use of "American 'gangster' methods" was considered subtle criticism of America. In addition, a scene of a mentally ill ex-soldier shouting "Banzai for the emperor!" was cut for belittling the emperor system, which had been recognized by the occupation. Although the CCD recanted on some criticisms made by its censors, a total of thirty minutes of footage was excised from the rough cut of the film.

== Reception ==
War and Peace was ranked the second best film of 1947 in Kinema Junpo magazine.
