= City of Violence =

City of Violence may refer to:

- City of Violence, an alternate title for the 1950 Japanese crime drama film Street of Violence
- City of Violence, an alternate title for the 1951 Italian drama film Love and Blood
- The City of Violence, a 2006 Korean martial arts film
