= Rehabilitation Clothing (Kōseifuku) =

Japanese clothing production practice

Kōseifuku, (更生服), translated as remade or rehabilitation clothing, refers to the nationwide practice in Japan during the late Asia-Pacific War and early postwar period of re-using existing textiles, most commonly kimono or monpe, to make new typically Western-influenced clothing. It is a term originating from combining 更生（こうせい）meaning rehabilitation; regeneration; restoration or revival, and 服（ふく）meaning clothing.

Rehabilitation clothing is often associated with the resurgence of Western-style clothing in Japan in the immediate postwar period, and a general fatigue following harsh wartime restrictions and patriotic campaigns against luxury with the catchphrase, “Luxury is the Enemy!” (zeitaku wa teki da). This campaign was championed by the Patriotic Women's Association (Aikoku Fujinkai) and after 1942, by the Greater Japan Women's Association (Dai Nippon fujinkai). Members would stand on street corners and protest, criticising women for wearing lavish kimono, accessories, perms or cosmetics, the latter also becoming banned in the early 1940s.

Many women preferred making rehabilitation clothing because it gave them greater freedom to wear different styles and following fashionable Western trends, something that wasn't possible when monpe was the preferred Standard Dress for women in the later years of the war. Monpe could be similarly made from existing clothing, although were considered "baggy", unflattering and unfeminine, and encouraged by the government because they were practical and a "properly indigenous" Japanese wartime dress. From 1947 it was reported that women were re-cycling their monpe into skirts, continuing the life-cycle of their textiles, and demonstrating access to consumer goods and even basic necessities continued to be a daily struggle for at least a year after the war ended. Japanese women also used second-hand American surplus materials where possible to make rehabilitation clothing.

There are surviving contemporary wartime examples of kōseifuku available to view online on the Tokyo Museum Collection (ToMuCo) website.

== Rehabilitation clothing's impact on Japanese fashion ==
Rehabilitation clothing was one of the first ways Japanese women engaged with Western fashion following the end of the war. It is also connected with the rise in dressmaking culture in Japan, as well as the growing popularity of fashion magazines and illustration. Yet in the context of total war and recovery from it, it is unsurprising that the practice of rehabilitation clothing was considered ‘a period of stagnation for “style pictures or fashion design pictures,”' by some historians, as the postwar fashion scene began trying to establish itself. However, others argue that because of the new dressmaking culture, fashion magazines such as So-en promoted rehabilitation clothing and sewing patterns for Western-style clothing because women could explore the latest fashion trends in America and Europe, and develop the skills to make and wear the clothes herself. There are also examples from famous graphic artist and fashion illustrator, Nakahara Jun'ichi, who became well known during the war for his illustrations for Shojo no Tomo and made illustrations of girls wearing monpe and rehabilitation clothing. Department stores such as Mitsukoshi sold rehabilitation clothing too, "converting kimono silk into skirts and military cloth into coats" for women to buy instead of having to make it themselves.

== Similar Textile Recycling Campaigns during the Second World War ==
There are similar recycling campaigns elsewhere during and after the Second World War due to textile rationing typical of wartime. For example, the Make Do and Mend campaign in Britain and the Reichsspinnstoff-Sammlungen in Germany. There were also increased efforts in the US to implement unofficial textile rationing through voluntary co-operation. This ultimately led to regulation L-85 issued in March 1942, which restricted the amount of material to be used in women’s clothing and encouraged women to be creative in up-cycling their clothing.
