= Charles Louis Kades =

American lawyer

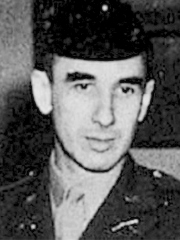
Kades during the Government Section years

Charles Louis Kades (March 12, 1906 – June 18, 1996) was an American soldier and lawyer who served as both chief and deputy chief of GHQ's Government Section in World War II. Kades played a central role in creating GHQ's draft of the Japanese constitution, and profoundly affected the direction of Japan following the war.

== Early life ==
Kades was born to Jewish parents in Newburgh, New York. After graduating from Cornell University in 1927 and Harvard Law School in 1930, Kades worked at the Manhattan law firm of Hawkins, Delafield, and Longfellow as a municipal bond lawyer. From 1933 to 1942, Kades helped implement New Deal policies as the assistant general counsel for the Public Works Administration and then the United States Department of Treasury.

== World War II, the Allied occupation of Japan, and revising the Japanese constitution ==
An Army reservist since 1924, Kades entered active military duty with the US Army in 1942. After service in the Army Civil Affairs Division in Washington, he participated in the U.S. D-Day landing in Southern France in August, 1944. Ten days after being promoted to the rank of colonel, Kades went to Japan as a member of the occupation forces on August 25, 1945. Although originally serving as the chief of GHQ's Government Section, Kades became deputy chief following the arrival of the new chief, Major General Courtney Whitney, in December, 1946. As deputy chief, Kades was ordered by Supreme Commander for the Allied Powers (SCAP) Douglas MacArthur to chair GHQ's Steering Committee on revising Japan's constitution.

=== Order to revise the constitution and committee formation ===
According to Kades, he was first informed of MacArthur's order for the Government Section to revise the Japanese constitution on February 3, 1946. Having concluded that the constitutional "revisions" presented by the Japanese the previous day were unacceptable, MacArthur decided that a "model" constitution was needed. These orders were given to Whitney, who then conveyed them to Kades along with notes in pencil dictating the following three principles that would shape the draft:

1. The Emperor is the head of state, his succession is dynastic, and his duties and powers are subject to the constitution and the people's will.

2. Japan renounces the right to war, and shall maintain no army, navy, or air force.

3. The Japanese feudal system is abolished, and all rights of peerage and nobility will be replaced with a system based on the British Parliament.

Upon receiving these orders, Kades became part of the three-man Steering Committee who would lead the drafting process. Kades, along with Lieutenant Colonel Frank Hays and Commander Alfred Hussey, decided to split the Government Section into seven committees that would each work on different sections of the constitution. Whitney accepted this idea, and announced it to Government Section on February 4, 1946 with orders to keep the project top secret. He gave the Government Section one week to complete the drafting process.

=== The drafting process ===
According to Kades, "the Steering Committee charged each committee with the responsibility of conforming its draft to the general principles set forth in a State-War-Navy Coordinating Committee's statement of policy entitled 'Reform of the Japanese Governmental System' (SWNCC 228)," and also to "...follow the format of the Meiji Constitution as closely as would be consistent with the changes each committee would recommend."

Although the drafting process was completely controlled by Americans, the drafters did not simply import the American constitution, nor did they create a completely new constitution either. According to Kades, "Japanese sources were most useful. Used to good advantage were outlines of draft constitutions that had been published by the [Japanese]Progressive, Liberal, and Socialist Parties. The drafters also referred to constitutions from approximately twelve other countries that were obtained by Beate Sirota and Lieutenant Milton Esman, and Kades encouraged drafters to also consult the Meiji Constitution of 1889. More specifically the drafters drew on the model Constitution presented by the Constitution Research Society headed by Yasuzō Suzuki, which had been translated into English in December 1945. Furthermore, the Article renouncing war was suggested to General Douglas MacArthur by the then Japanese prime minister, Kijūrō Shidehara, who was known for his peace diplomacy in the interwar period when he was foreign minister.

From February 4 to February 7, each committee prepared and submitted their respective draft to the steering committee for advice on revision. After meeting with each committee on February 8 and 9, the steering committee submitted a consolidated draft to General Whitney on February 10 consisting of thirty-three articles. MacArthur received this draft from Whitney the same day and approved it on February 11, making only one change. On February 12, the draft underwent final changes by the steering committee and members of the various Government Section committees, was again submitted to MacArthur via Whitney, and approved that night for submission to Japanese officials.

=== Submitting the GHQ draft and the marathon drafting session ===
On February 13, 1946, Whitney and the steering committee members presented four copies of the completed GHQ draft to Foreign Minister Shigeru Yoshida, minister without portfolio charged with studying the new constitution Jōji Matsumoto, Foreign ministry interpreter Genkichi Hasegawa, and Yoshida's aid Jirō Shirasu. Whitney explained to these Cabinet members that their draft submitted on February 2 was wholly unacceptable and that a draft more acceptable to the supreme commander had been prepared for them. The Americans then moved to the garden of the residence and waited for about one hour as the Japanese officials read the draft. Yoshida explained that he could not comment on this draft before consulting with Prime Minister Kijūrō Shidehara, to which Whitney replied that passing the draft was in the government's best interest and the four Americans left.

After this meeting, the Japanese Cabinet replied with letters explaining that the American draft was too direct and contained ideas that would not work in Japan. Whitney reiterated the drafts benefits and explained that SCAP was prepared to present its draft to the Japanese people directly should the Cabinet refuse it.

At 10:00 AM on March 4, 1946, Japanese Cabinet officials delivered a new draft based on GHQ's to SCAP headquarters. Whitney, the steering committee and translators/interpreters for GHQ immediately met with these Cabinet members to translate and discuss the draft. Japanese officials had removed and/or altered many ideas, such as popular sovereignty, which Kades insisted was unacceptable. The two groups argued about these changes until Matsumoto left the meeting and relinquished responsibility to Tatsuo Satō and the remaining officials. At this point, it was decided that no one else could leave until a draft acceptable to both groups was completed. The two groups continued to argue about both the meaning of words and the inclusion of certain amendments. Negotiations continued until the evening of March 5, completing a thirty-two-hour drafting session. This new draft was submitted to MacArthur immediately, who then approved it later that night. The Japanese published a translated outline the following day, and MacArthur publicly endorsed it.

=== Constitutional debate in the Japanese government and adoption of a new constitution ===
Following the elections of 1946, a special committee was appointed to study SCAP's draft, which had been presented as Japanese product. The draft was debated and amended, both directly by Japanese lawmakers and indirectly through SCAP, until being put up for a vote. The constitution, which had undergone approximately thirty revisions by Japanese lawmakers, was adopted on October 7, 1946 by a vote of 421 to 8 in the House of Representatives and a vote of over 300 to 2 in the House of Peers. Emperor Hirohito announced the promulgation of this new constitution on November 3, 1946 and the constitution became effective on May 3, 1947.

== Controversy involving Kades ==
A famous episode in Kades' life involved an affair with Torio Tsuruyo. Following Kades' participation in purging bureaucrats from the Ministry of Home Affairs, National Rural Police Director Noboru Saitō, along with former ministry bureaucrats, supported G2 (GHQ's intelligence section) in an attempt to oust Kades. However, Kades learned of this plot through Lady Tsuruyo Torio, and had leaders of the police headquarters demoted. In addition, some believe that Kades, in order to disguise his motivations, distorted the truth and forced a special investigations unit of the Tokyo District Public Prosecutors Office to form a case against this group on charges of bureaucratic corruption.

== Military retirement and post-war life ==
On May 3, 1949 Kades resigned as deputy chief of the Government Section, choosing to leave Japan exactly two years from the day the Japanese constitution was adopted. Kades then returned to New York, where he worked as a lawyer until retiring in 1976. He died in 1996 at the age of 90.

In 1948 he married Australian actress (Helen) Patricia Minchin ("Miss Sydney 1931"). It was a second marriage for both of them. They lived at Dobbs Ferry, New York, with two children from her first marriage. She left him in 1959 to return to Sydney with their daughter Caroline (born 1954) and they were divorced. She won custody of Caroline after protracted court proceedings. Kades later married again, as did Patricia. She died in 2002 aged 92.

His personal papers are housed in the Gordon W. Prange Collection, University of Maryland Libraries, University of Maryland. The Charles L. Kades Papers includes the Japanese and English versions of most drafts of Japanese Constitution, memoranda, Committee minutes, letters, check sheets and an imperial message regarding the revision of the Japanese constitution.
