= Fumio Kamei =

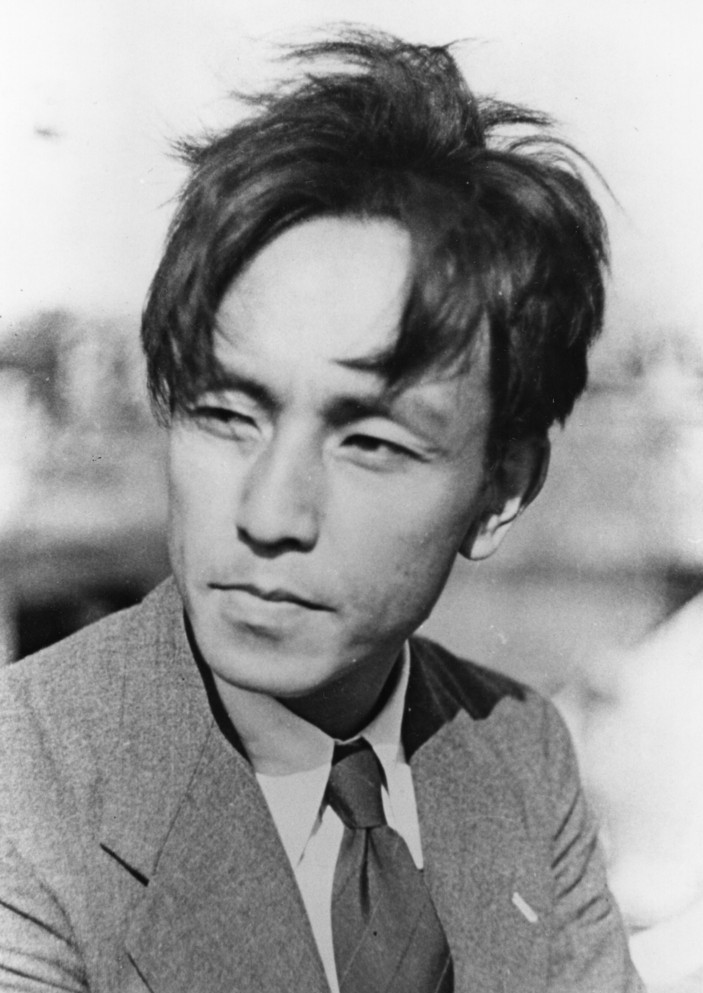
- Born: 1 April 1908
- Died: 27 February 1987 (aged 78)
- Occupation: film director

Fumio Kamei (亀井文夫, Kamei Fumio) (1 April 1908 – 27 February 1987) was a Japanese documentary and fiction film director.

== Biography ==
Kamei went to the Soviet Union in 1928 to study filmmaking, but had to return home because of an illness. He eventually began working at Photo Chemical Laboratories (PCL), one of the precursors to Toho, where he made a name for himself making documentaries - or "culture films" (bunka eiga) as they were called at the time - that were strongly influenced by Soviet montage theory. Many were propaganda films about Japan's war in China, such as Shanghai and Peking, but his Fighting Soldiers (Tatakau heitai) was criticized by authorities as a potentially anti-war film, one police official in fact protesting that "These aren't fighting soldiers, they're tired soldiers!" The release of the film was blocked, but Fighting Soldiers was later celebrated as one of the masterpieces of Japanese documentary. After making a film about the poet Kobayashi Issa, Kamei became the first filmmaker to lose his license to direct under the 1939 Film Law and was the only Japanese film director arrested for violation of the Peace Preservation Law.

After Japan's defeat in World War II, Kamei participated in the re-organization of the newsreel company Nippon Eiga-sha, or Nichiei, which had weathered wartime controls then disbanded after the surrender. Under the Allied Occupation, Kamei directed a documentary titled The Japanese Tragedy. The film, produced by Akira Iwasaki and largely assembled from pre-war and wartime newsreels and still photographs provided by Nichiei, condemned the expansionist nationalist policy of the Empire of Japan, which the film argues was the result of a capitalist system. The film shifts to the present day, reporting on war criminals at Sugamo Prison and stating that there were still more criminals at large, including the Emperor. The Japanese Tragedy was approved by the Occupation's Civil Censorship Detachment after a series of deletions pertaining to the treatment of war criminals, but did not find distribution outside of a few independent local theatres. A second review, reportedly at the private request of Premier Shigeru Yoshida, concluded that the film's depiction of the Emperor could provoke civil disturbances, and all prints of the film were confiscated.

Kamei also made fiction films such as War and Peace (Sensō to heiwa), co-directed with Satsuo Yamamoto, but he primarily continued to produce independent documentaries protesting such issues as American bases in Japan, the nuclear bomb, discrimination against burakumin in Japan, and environmental destruction.

== Selected filmography ==
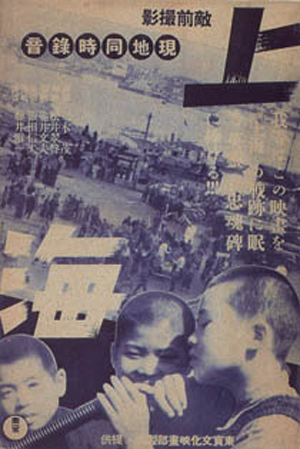
Advertisement for Shanghai

- Shanghai (上海) (1937)
- Peking (北京) (1938)
- Fighting Soldiers (戦ふ兵隊 Tatakau heitai) (1938)
- Kobayashi Issa (小林一茶) (1941)
- Tragedy of Japan (日本の悲劇 Nihon no higeki) (1946)
- War and Peace (戦争と平和 Sensō to heiwa) (1947)
- It's Good to Live (生きていてよかった Ikite ite yokatta) (1956)
- Record of Blood: Sunagawa (流血の記録 砂川 Ryūketsu no kiroku: Sunagawa) (1957)
- Men Are All Brothers (人間みな兄弟 Ningen mina kyodai) (1960)
