= Satsuo Yamamoto =

Japanese film director (1910–1983)

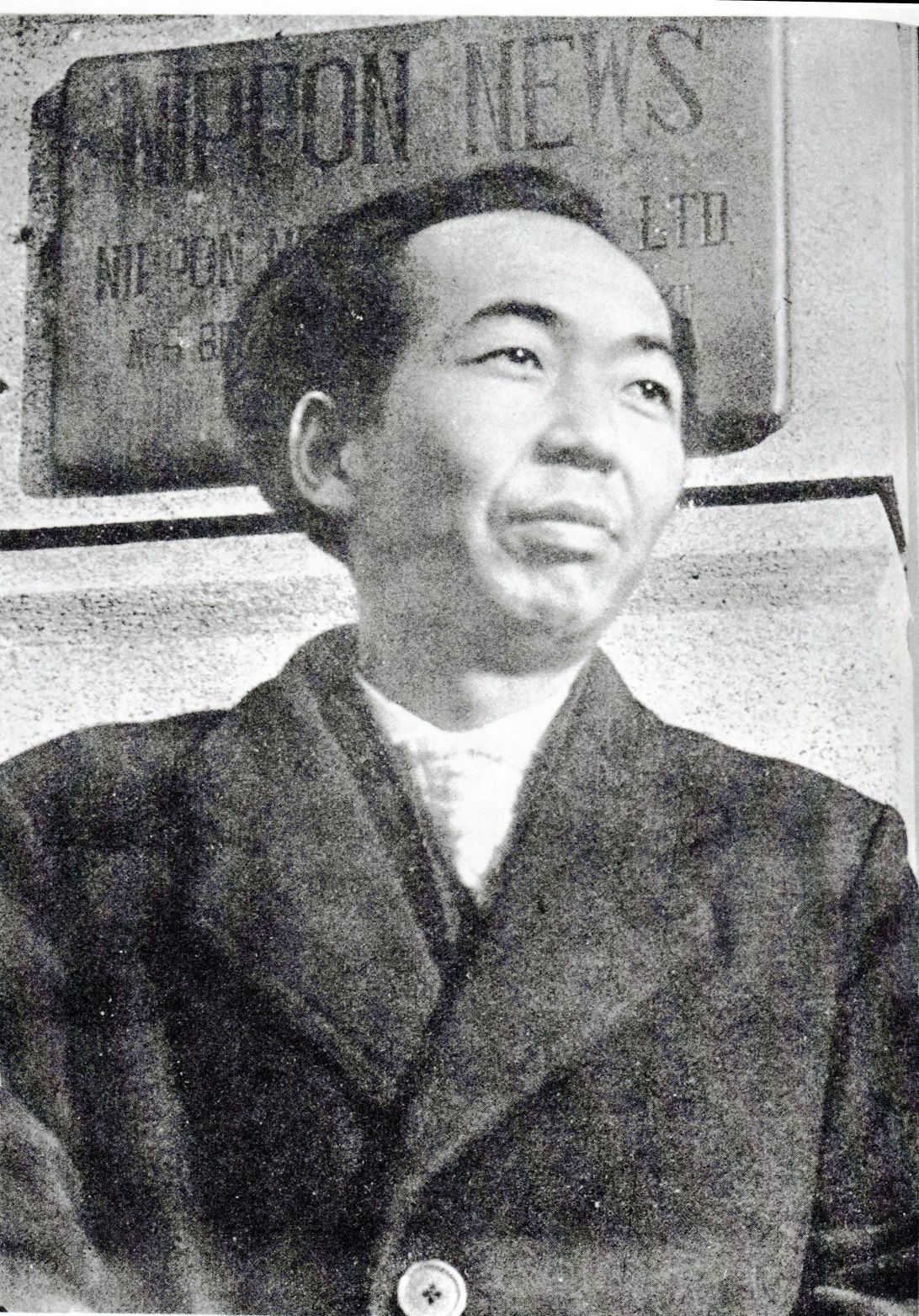
- Satsuo Yamamoto in 1950.
- Born: 15 July 1910; Kagoshima City, Japan
- Died: 11 August 1983 (aged 73); Tokyo
- Occupation: Film director
- Relatives: Kei Yamamoto (nephew)

Satsuo Yamamoto (山本 薩夫, Yamamoto Satsuo; 10 July 1910 – 11 August 1983) was a Japanese film director.

== Career ==
Yamamoto was born in Kagoshima City. After leaving Waseda University, where he had become affiliated with left-wing groups, he joined the Shochiku film studios in 1933, where he worked as an assistant director to Mikio Naruse. He followed Naruse when the latter moved to P.C.L. film studios (later Toho) and debuted as a director in 1937 with Ojōsan. During World War II he directed the propaganda films Winged Victory and Hot Winds before being drafted and sent to China.

After returning to Japan, Yamamoto's first film was War and Peace, co-directed with Fumio Kamei. Being a communist and an active supporter of the union during the Toho strikes, he left the studio in 1948 after the strikes' forced ending and turned to independent filmmaking. The commercially successful Street of Violence (1950) was produced by a committee named after the film's original title Bōryoku no machi, while the left-wing production company Shinsei Eiga-sha ("New star films"), formed by former Toho unionists, produced the anti-war film Vacuum Zone (1953), which film historian Donald Richie called "the strongest anti-military film ever made in Japan" in 1959. The 1959 Ballad of the Cart was produced by the National Rural Film Association and won him the Mainichi Film Award for Best Director.

In the 1960s, Yamamoto again worked for major companies like Daiei and Nikkatsu, directing films like Band of Assassins (1962), The Ivory Tower (1966) and Zatoichi the Outlaw (1967). He died in Tokyo on 11 August 1983, at the age of 73.

== Selected filmography ==
=== Films ===
Title	Studio	Release date
Ojosan お嬢さん	PCL	1937
War and Peace 戦争と平和	Toho	22 July 1947
Konna Onnani Daregashita こんな女に誰がした	Toyoko Film (Distributed by Daiei Film)	4 July 1949
Street of Violence 暴力の街; Boryoku no Machi	Bōryoku no machi production committee (Distributed by Daiei Film)	26 February 1950
Hakone Fūunroku 箱根風雲録	Shinsei Film, Zenshin Za	14 March 1952
Vacuum Zone 真空地帯; Shinkūchitai	Hokuto Film	15 December 1952
Hi no Hate 日の果て	Yagi Pro/Sehai (Distributed by Shochiku Film)	3 February 1954
Taiyō no nai Machi 太陽のない街	Shinsei Film	24 June 1954
Taifu Sodoki 台風騒動記	Yamamoto Production	19 December 1956
Ballad of the Cart 荷車の歌; Niguruma no Uta	Zenkoku Noson Eiga Kyokai	11 February 1959
Ningen no Kabe 人間の壁	Yamamoto Production (Distributed by Shintoho)	27 January 1961
Matsukawa Jiken 松川事件	Matsukawa Jikengeki Eiga Seisakuiinkai	27 January 1961
Shinobi no Mono 忍びの者	Daiei Film	1 December 1962
Zoku Shinobi no Mono 続・忍びの者	Daiei Film	10 August 1963
Nippon Dorobō Monogatari にっぽん泥棒物語	Daiei Film	1 May 1965
Ivory Tower 白い巨塔	Daiei Film	15 October 1966
The Bride From Hades 牡丹燈籠	Daiei Film	15 June 1968
Men and War 戦争と人間; Senso to Ningen	Nikkatsu	14 August 1970 (I); 12 June 1971 (II); 11 August 1973 (III)
Karei-naru Ichizoku 華麗なる一族	Geiensha (Distributed by Toho)	26 January 1974
Kinkanshoku 金環蝕	Daiei (Distributed by Toho)	6 September 1975
Barren Land 不毛地帯	Geiensha (Distributed by Toho)	14 August 1976
Kōtei no Inai Hachigatsu 皇帝のいない八月	Shochiku	23 September 1978
Nomugi Pass あゝ野麦峠; Ah Nomugi Toge	Shin Nihon Eiga (Distributed by Toho)	30 June 1979
Nomugi Pass Shinryokuhen あゝ野麦峠 新緑篇; Ah Nomugi Toge Shinrokuhen	Toho	6 February 1982

== Awards ==
Kinema Junpo Awards

Yamamoto received the Kinema Junpo Award for Best Director for Ivory Tower, which was also awarded Best Film.

Blue Ribbon Awards

Yamamoto won the Blue Ribbon Award for Best Director for Shōnin no isu and Nippon dorobō monogatari (both 1965). Ivory Tower was awarded Best Film the following year.

Mainichi Fim Awards

Yamamoto was awarded Best Director at the Mainichi Film Awards for Ballad of the Cart and Ningen no kane (both 1959), Ivory Tower, Men and War and Barren Land. Ivory Tower, Barren Land and Nomugi Pass were winners in the Best Film category.

Festival prizes

Ivory Tower was entered into the 5th Moscow International Film Festival where it was awarded the Silver Prize.

== Books ==
- Yamamoto Satsuo: My Life as a Filmmaker (私の映画人生, Watakushi no eiga jinsei), published in English in 2017 by University of Michigan Press, translated by Chia-ning Chang. - It is an autobiography that was first published after Yamamoto died.

== Bibliography ==
- Yamamoto, Satsuo (2017). My life as a filmmaker. Chang, Chia-ning. Baltimore, Maryland: Project Muse. ISBN 9780472122493. OCLC 990075123.
