= Zatoichi the Outlaw =

Japanese name
- Kanji: 座頭市牢破り
Transcriptions
- Revised Hepburn: Zatōichi rōyaburi
- Directed by: Satsuo Yamamoto
- Written by: Koji Matsumoto; Takehiro Nakajima; Kiyokata Saruwaka
- Based on: Zatoichi by Kan Shimozawa
- Produced by: Masaichi Nagata
- Starring: Shintaro Katsu; Rentarō Mikuni; Kō Nishimura; Toshiyuki Hosokawa
- Cinematography: Kazuo Miyagawa
- Edited by: Kanji Suganuma
- Music by: Sei Ikeno
- Production companies: Daiei Studios; Katsu Productions
- Release date: 12 August 1967 (Japan)
- Running time: 96 minutes
- Country: Japan
- Language: Japanese

Zatoichi the Outlaw (座頭市牢破り, Zatōichi rōyaburi) is a 1967 Japanese chambara film directed by Satsuo Yamamoto and starring Shintaro Katsu as the blind masseur Zatoichi. It was originally released by the Daiei Motion Picture Company (later acquired by Kadokawa Pictures), and is the first film produced by Katsu Productions (Katsu's own company).

Zatoichi the Outlaw is the sixteenth episode in the 26-part film series devoted to the character of Zatoichi.

== Plot ==
In a rural village, Zatoichi (Katsu) encounters Shushi Ohara (Suzuki; modeled after 18th-century agriculturalist Yagaku Ohara) a sword-less rōnin who defends himself against multiple attackers without killing them. Ohara leads a peasant movement advocating the abstention from gambling, drinking, and whoring.

== Cast ==
- Shintaro Katsu as Zatoichi
- Rentarō Mikuni as Boss Asagoro
- Kō Nishimura as Suga
- Yuko Hamada as Oshino
- Toshiyuki Hosokawa as Nisaburo
- Takuya Fujioka as Zatosanji
- Kenjiro Ishiyama as Tatsugoro
- Tatsuo Endo as Boss Tomizo
- Kayo Mikimoto as Oyuki
- Tatsuo Matsushita as Yamagen
- Mizuho Suzuki as Shushi Ohara

== Reception ==
In a contemporary review, "Chie." of Variety noted that this Zatoichi film was given a big name director Satsuo Yamamoto and a well known actor Rentarō Mikuni which made the film "inflated [...] which, by comparison with the others, not very entertaining."

J. Doyle Wallis, in a review for DVD Talk, wrote that "[t]his film has one of the better plots in the series, the almost hippie ex-samurai's teaching posing as a threat to the gangsters who prefer the villagers to lead debauched lives. Unfortunately some of the storytelling is sloppy, particularly the side-plot characters who Ichi becomes involved with. Their introductions and back story were told so quickly and incidentally, that when their stories began to get a third act wrap up, I had trouble recalling who they were in the first place."
