= Tragedy of Japan =

1946 short film

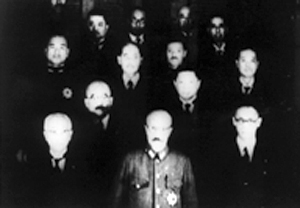
- Still photo from "Tragedy of Japan"
- Japanese: 日本の悲劇
- Directed by: Fumio Kamei
- Release date: 1946

Tragedy of Japan (日本の悲劇, Nihon no higeki) is a 1946 Japanese Documentary by director Fumio Kamei. It offers a leftist, critical analysis of Imperial Japan before, and during WW2.

== Synopsis ==
The film describes Imperial Japan through a critical lens. Political repression in Japan, the Japanese invasion of Manchuria in 1931, the assassination of the Japanese prime minister Inukai Tsuyoshi by fascists in 1933, the Anti-Comintern Pact between Germany, and Japan, the Second Sino-Japanese war, and the Japanese attack on Pearl Harbor are discussed in the film. The film also puts the emperor responsible for the many war-victims. Japan's capitalist class, who sought to acquire foreign markets, is also blamed for the war. The persecution of Communists in Japan is also highlighted. The film contains footage of the funeral of Takiji Kobayashi, the communist writer who was tortured and killed by the Japanese authorities before the outbreak of WW2.

== Banning by the US Occupation Authorities ==
The United States occupied Japan following the end of WW2. Kamei's film, which was released during the occupation, was subject to an exhibition ban by the Occupation's GHQ for pursuing the Emperor's war responsibility. At the time it has been illegal to criticize the Emperor. The film was put away and given the designation 'communist'.
