= Ryō Ikebe =

Japanese actor (1918–2010)

- 池部 良
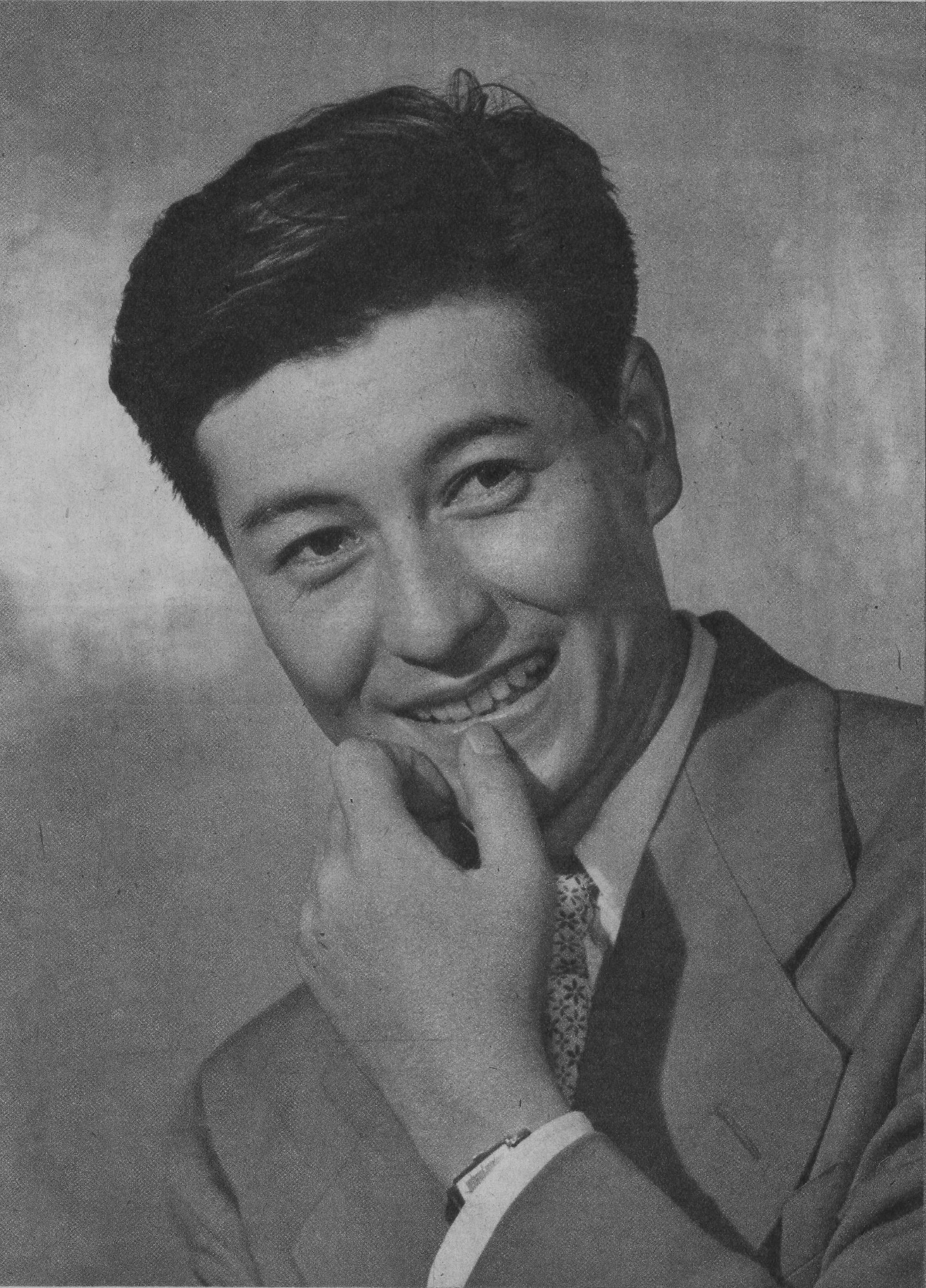
- Ryō Ikebe in 1952
- Born: 11 February 1918; Ōta-ku, Tokyo, Japan
- Died: 8 October 2010 (aged 92); Tokyo, Japan
- Occupation: Actor
- Years active: 1941–2010

Ryō Ikebe (池部 良, Ikebe Ryō; 11 February 1918 – 8 October 2010) was a Japanese actor. He graduated from Rikkyō University and originally wanted to be a director, but ended up debuting as an actor at Tōhō in 1941. He did not achieve popularity until starring in a series of youth films in the late 1940s. He expanded his acting range in the 1950s, while still frequently appearing in genre films, such as Tōhō tokusatsu films and yakuza films at Tōei. One key role of his was in the 1964 film noir Pale Flower. Apparently, he was cast by Masahiro Shinoda despite saying that he was a "ham actor". Shinoda stated that he cast him because of his sleek features present in films such as Early Spring (1956) and wanted to feel the "quality of a man down on his luck." (at the time of production, Ikebe happened to be at home because of a bad experience he had acting in a play where he couldn't remember his lines). He was also known as an essayist. On 8 October 2010, he died of blood poisoning. He was 92 years old.

== Selected filmography ==
=== Film ===
- The Sky of Hope (1942) - Tsutomu
- Midori no daichi (1942) - Kome Yan
- Yottsu no koi no monogatari (1947) - Masao (episode 1)
- War and Peace (1947)
- Haru no kyôen (1947) - Sampei Hayasaka
- Ai yo hoshi to tomo ni (1947)
- Sono yo no boken (1948)
- Hakai (1948) - Segawa
- Niizuma kaigi (1949)
- Koi no jusan yoru (1949)
- Shin'ya no kokuhaku (1949) - Newspaper Reporter Moriguchi Shigeya
- Aoi sanmyaku (青い山脈) (1949) - Rokusuke Kaneya
- Zoku aoi sanmyaku (1949) - Rokusuke Kaneya
- Kikoku (Damoi) (1949)
- Rinchi (1949) - Nobuo Sugawara
- Escape at Dawn (暁の脱走, Akatsuki no dasso) (1950) - Mikami
- Conduct Report on Professor Ishinaka (1950)
- Bōryoku no Machi (ペン偽らず 暴力の街 Pen itsurazu: Bōryoku no machi) (1950)
- Onna no shiki (1950)
- Tsuma to onna kisha: Wakai ai no kiki (1950) - Ryôhei Kajimoto
- Yama no kanata ni - Dai ichi-bu: Ringo no hoo (1950)
- Yama no kanata ni - Dai ni-bu: Sakana no seppun (1950)
- Akatsuki no tsuiseki (1950)
- Yama no kanata ni - Dai ichi-bu: Ringo no hoo: Dai ni-bu: Sakana no seppun - Sôshûhen (1950)
- Ai to nikushimi no kanata e (1951)
- Takarazuka fujin (1951)
- Wakai musumetachi (1951) - Kawasaki
- Nessa no byaku ran (1951)
- Hakamadare Yasusuke (1951)
- Aoi shinju (1951)
- Wakôdo no uta (1951)
- Bungawan soro (1951)
- Onnagokoro dare ka shiru (1951)
- Koi no rantô (1951)
- Koibito (1951)
- Kaze futatabi (1952)
- Asa no hamon (1952) - Niheita Inobe
- Kin no tamago: Golden girl (1952)
- Wakai hito (1952)
- Gendai-jin (現代人 Gendaijin) (1952)
- Ashi ni sawatta onna (1952) - Gohei
- Oka wa hanazakari (1952) - Masaya Nozaki
- Yoru no owari (1953) - Shinji Kizaki
- Tokai no yokogao (1953) - Ueda [sandwich man]
- Ashita wa dotchi da (1953) - Saniwa
- Botchan (1953) - Botchan
- Bochan (1953)
- Chi no hate made (1953)
- Onna gokoro wa hitosuji ni (1953) - Gintarô
- Farewell Rabaul (1954) - Captain Wakabayashi
- Kaze tachinu (1954) - Eyoichi Fukuyama
- Geisha Konatsu (1954) - Kubo
- Watashi no subete o (1954) - Saburo Seki
- Kimi shinitamo koto nakare (1954)
- Ani-san no aijô (1954)
- Koi-gesho (1955) - Rikiya Kizu
- Owarai torimonocho-hatchan hatsutegara (1955)
- Fumetsu no nekkyû (1955)
- Sanjusan go sha otonashi (1955)
- The Lone Journey (旅路, Tabiji) (1955) - Naojiro Mikazuki
- Rangiku monogatari (乱菊物語) (1956)
- Early Spring (早春 Sōshun) (1956) - Shôji Sugiyama
- Vampire Moth (1956) - Kindaichi Kōsuke
- Kon'yaku sanbagarasu (1956)
- Gendai no yokubô (1956) - Hiroshi Tanigawa
- The Legend of the White Serpent (白夫人の妖恋, Byaku fujin no yoren) (1956) - Xu Xian
- Kojinbutu no fufu (1956)
- Ani to sono musume (1956) - Kaisuke Mamiya
- Bôkyaku no hanabira (1957)
- Snow Country (雪国 Yukiguni) (1957) - Shimamura
- Bôkyaku no hanabira: Kanketsuhen (1957)
- Yuunagi (1957) - Kosuke Igawa
- Datsugokushû (1957)
- Shizukanaru otoko (1957)
- Ankoru watto monogatari utsukushiki aishu (1958) - Shun'ichi Kawai
- A Holiday in Tokyo (東京の休日, Tōkyō no kyūjitsu) (1958) - Senpai
- Yajikata dôchû sugoroku (1958) - Ryônosuke Taya
- Daigaku no ninkimono (1958) - Coach Urano
- Jinsei gekijô - Seishun hen (1958)
- Kodama wa yonde iru (1959) - Seizô Nabayama
- Tegami o kakeru (1959)
- Submarine I-57 Will Not Surrender (潜水艦イ-57降伏せず, Sensuikan I-57 kofuku sezu) (1959)
- Anyakôro (1959) - Kensaku Tokito
- Oneechan makari tôru (1959)
- Battle in Outer Space (宇宙大戦争, Uchū daisensō) (1959) - Maj. Ichiro Katsumiya
- Kêisatsû-kan to bôryôku-dan (1959)
- Hawai Middowei daikaikûsen: Taiheiyô no arashi (1960)
- Man Against Man (1960) - Kikumori
- Sararîman Chûshingura (1960) - Takuni Asano
- Jiyûgaoka fujin (1960)
- Toiretto shacho (1961)
- Toilet buchô (1961) - Noboru Kasajima
- Kuroi gashû dainibu: Kanryû (1961)
- Kaei (1961)
- Gorath (妖星ゴラス, Yōsei Gorasu) (1962) - Dr. Tazawa - Astrophysicist
- Ika naru hoshi no moto ni (1962) - Kurahashi
- Chūshingura: Hana no Maki, Yuki no Maki (1962) - Chikara Tsuchiya
- Attack Squadron! (1963)
- Chintao yôsai bakugeki meirei (1963)
- Pale Flower (乾いた花, Kawaita hana) (1964) - Muraki
- Haigo no hito (1965) - Yoshio Shido
- Daikon to ninjin (1965) - Kotaki
- Oshaberi na shinju (1965)
- Kemonomichi (1965) - Shôjirô Kotaki
- Shôwa zankyô-den (1965) - Kazama
- Shôwa zankyô-den: Karajishi botan (1966)
- Showa zankyo-den: Ippiki okami (1966)
- Otoko dokyô de shobû (1966)
- Shôwa zankyô-den: Chizome no karajishi (1967) - Jûkichi Kazama
- Zankyô Abarehada (1967) - Kyohei Shigemasa
- San-nin no bakuto (1967)
- Otoko no shobu: kantô arashî (1967)
- Moeru kumo (1967)
- Ah kaiten tokubetsu kogetikai (1968)
- Rikugun chôhô 33 (1968) - Suharut Danan
- Gokuchu no kaoyaku (1968)
- Ah, yokaren (1968) - Staff Officer Matsumoto
- Shôwa zankyô-den: Karajishi jingi (1969)
- Chôkôsô no akebono (1969)
- Gendai yakuza: Yotamono jingi (1969) - Goro's elder brother
- Tosei-nin Retsuden (1969)
- Shushô jingi: O-inochi chôdai (1969)
- Showa zankyo-den: Hito-kiri karajishi (1969)
- Shôwa zankyô-den: Shinde moraimasu (1970)
- Nihon boryoku-dan: kumicho kuzure (1970)
- Battle of Okinawa (1971)
- Showa zankyo-den: hoero karajishi (1971)
- Showa zankyo-den: Yabure-gasa (1972)
- Hikage-mono (1972)
- Bokyo Komori-uta (1972)
- Chokugeki! Jigoku-ken (1974) - Arashiyama
- Chokugeki jigoku-ken: Dai-gyakuten (1974) - Arashiyama
- Â kessen kôkûtai (1974)
- Saikai (1975)
- Hi no ataru sakamichi (1975)
- Manhunt (1976) - Ito
- The War in Space (惑星大戦争, Wakusei daisensō) (1977) - Professor Takigawa
- Tarao Bannai (1978) - Nobuyuki Kinomata
- Kaichô-on (1980) - Riichiro Ujima
- Station (駅 STATION, Eki Station) (1981) - Chief Nakagawa
- Shōsetsu Yoshida gakkō (小説吉田学校) (1983) - Taketora Ogata
- Izakaya Chôji (1983) - Horie
- The Audition (1984) - Shozo godai
- Mishima: A Life in Four Chapters (1985) - Interrogator (segment "Runaway Horses")
- Hitohira no yuki (1985)
- Lost in the Wilderness (1986) - Sanada
- Umi e, See You (1988) - Nakazawa
- Aoi sanmyaku '88 (1988) - Zenbei Terazawa

=== Television dramas ===
- Karei-naru Ichizoku (1974–75) - Shōichi Mikumo
- Sanga Moyu (1984) - Kenny Matsubara
- Dokuganryū Masamune (1987) - Sen no Rikyū

== Bibliography ==
- Shimura, Miyoko; Yumiketa, Aya, eds. (2007). Eiga haiyū Ikebe Ryō. Waizu Shuppan. ISBN 978-4-89830-207-1.
