= Civil Censorship Detachment =

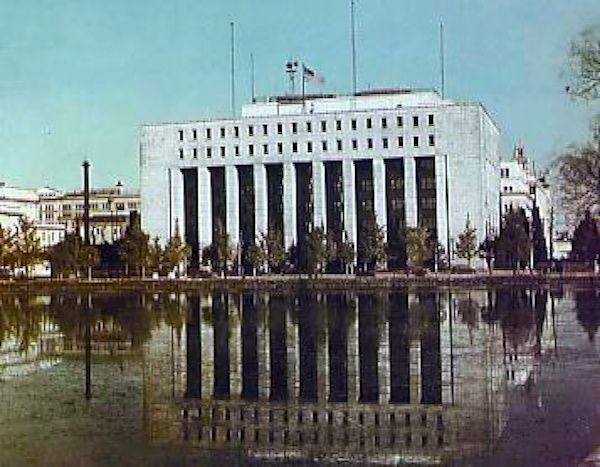
- GHQ-SCAP building c. 1950, where the Civil Censorship Detachment operated.
- Abbreviation: CCD
- Formation: September 10th, 1945
- Dissolved: August 9th, 1951
- Headquarters: DN Tower 21
- Parent organization: Supreme Commander of the Allied Powers

The Civil Censorship Detachment (CCD) (1945–1952) was a department created within the Civil Intelligence Section of the Supreme Commander for the Allied Powers (SCAP). The CCD monitored and censored Japanese entertainment, press, mass media, and various forms of public and private opinion during the Occupation of Japan.

It was founded on September 10, 1945, to promote pro-Western values of democracy, with the aim of ushering Japan into the reconstruction period. By its dissolution, the CCD had worked on a wide range of subjects; from Japanese actions during the war, to abuses and severe crimes committed by the Occupation soldiers. In 1946, the department was subsumed as part of G-2. On August 9, 1951, following many organizational upheavals, the Civil Censorship Detachment (CCD) was formally dissolved.

Much of its records are housed in the Gordon W. Prange Collection in the Hornbake Library at the University of Maryland.

== Structure ==
The CCD had two branches; the Communications Division and the Pictorial and Broadcasting Division. The Communication Division censored mail, telephone, telegraph, and other communications media. The Broadcasting Division was tasked with censoring information and entertainment media, such as news broadcasts, theater, and film.

The first chief of the CCD was Lieutenant Colonel Donald D. Hoover, with a background in journalism and public relations. Hoover was succeeded by Lieutenant Colonel C. W. Wordsworth, and then Colonel Walter B. Putnam, the last chief of the CCD before its dissolution in 1951.

The CCD was primarily composed of highly-educated Japanese nationals, often academics or western-educated graduates, they conducted the direct work of reading and translating. This included public opinion in the press, film, television program, and radio, as well as surveillance and monitoring of postal mail, telephone, telegraphs. These translations would then be reviewed by Nisei checkers, and as needed, subject to a reexamination committee. Decision on censorship were made by supervisors and leadership from the United States. It is estimated that by 1947, more than 8,000 Japanese workers were employed by the CCD.

== Background ==
Headed by General Douglas MacArthur, the United States imposed political restrictions and weakened the policy structures in Japan to implement a reformation consolidating democracy and the rule of law. Seeking American control, the consequent reformation of Japan's social system and ideology, held promise of long-term stable influence in Japan. The CCD worked to facilitate the success of these reconstruction aims by prohibiting negative sentiment in relation to the war, reconstruction, and the new alliance between the two countries. The consequences of this censorship were lasting, and the stories of Japanese victims such as the hibakusha, individuals who experienced physical change due to radiation exposure, and Japanese victims of rape by occupied soldiers remained long silenced.

=== Censorship efforts in post-war Japan ===
The U.S-led General Headquarters, Supreme Commander for the Allied Powers(GHQ-SCAP), following Japanese Occupation in 1945, aimed to prevent the revival of imperialism, militarism, and overcome dynamic tensions in Japanese society.

Through the SCAP, the United States carried out widespread censorship and monitoring of Japan with the creation of special agencies. Among these projects, the Civil Intelligence Section(CIS) in the Deputy Chief of Staff for Intelligence (G-2) undertook the main work. The CIS was divided into two parts, the Civil Censorship Detachment (CCD), and the Public Security Detachment (PSD). The CCD specifically undertook the censorship of public opinion in the press, publication, film, television, and radio, as well as monitoring the postal letters, phone calls, and telegram. In this period, more than 200 million letters, 136 million telegrams and 800,000 telephone calls from Japanese citizens were monitored. To assess telephone calls, 63 Japanese and 12 foreigners monitored calls throughout Japan by using 70 eavesdropping devices; for postal surveillance, 4,000 Japanese and 60 Americans sampled 2% of domestic correspondence; and finally for telegraphs, 100 Japanese and 12 American workers sampled 15% of total telegrams.

== List of censored topics ==
=== General prohibitions: protecting SCAP's reputation ===
In September 1945, the Supreme Commander for the Allied Powers (SCAP) released a Press Code illustrating a list of censored topics for the Japanese Press. The Code's requirements included:

- “...[N]o destructive criticism of the Allied Forces of Occupation and nothing which might invite mistrust or resentment of those troops.”
- No “false or destructive criticism of the Allied Powers,” which included criticisms of General MacArthur and SCAP.
- No “mention of the “fraternization” between Occupation troops and Japanese, and of involvement of soldiers with the black market.”
- No “dissemination of extremely pessimistic views of the food shortage.”

Censorship included not only new publications, but publications from the pre-war and wartime period that were reissued during the Occupation. Notable examples of censorship to protect SCAP reputation included the replacement of the term “hairy foreigner” (ketōjin) with “Westerner” (seiōjin). In addition to banning criticism of Occupation forces, criticism of China, Korea, and other Western allies were also prohibited by the CCD.

Additionally, the mention of fraternization between Japanese locals and Occupation forces constituted a significant portion of censorship, with the mention of even hand-holding enough to result in deletion. Censorship also applied to medical journals, especially targeting venereal diseases, which censors perceived as symbolic of immorality. For example, a 1945 report by the Japan Medical Care Organization was heavily censored for predicting an increase in the threat of venereal disease to public health, linked to the presence of Occupation forces and “fraternization” with locals. Another report on gonorrhea among Yokohama prostitutes (where many Occupation forces lived) was also subject to multiple deletions. Aside from STDs, the CCD also heavily censored any mention of rape, especially in cases with Japanese sex workers.

=== Nuclear bombs ===
One of the most controversial and difficult to censor topics impacting Occupation forces' reputation were the after-effects of the two nuclear bombs dropped on Nagasaki and Hiroshima. U.S. officials both within the United States and in Japan immediately worked to suppress information about the effects of nuclear radiation. While the blast of the bomb was celebrated by President Truman's radio broadcast as a powerful weapon of war, information about the resulting radiation deaths and illnesses caused by the atomic bombs were suppressed by officials. Medical reports, case notes, and other records collected by Japanese medical professionals who treated survivors at Hiroshima were confiscated by American officers and remained classified for years. Occupation officials outright denied radiation effects and censored public criticism of the U.S. bombings. They labeled Japanese and European reports of lingering “radioactive poison gas” as “propaganda”, most likely wishing to avoid international stigma surrounding chemical weapons, which had been banned during the First World War.

== Democratic project in Japan ==
Guidelines provided to publishers during the Occupation banned content that contained wartime propaganda, especially those that glorified the military, ultranationalism, feudalism, and depictions of Japan as “the sacred land of the gods.” The prohibition of such sentiments was aimed at facilitating Japan's transition to a democratic state and away from its pre-war and wartime politics as an empire. The censorship of such themes impacted the cinema, literature, and theater industries profoundly, along with some consequences even in medical journals.

In Japanese cinema, for example, the Civilian Information and Education Division (CIE), was given complete power to censor all films that were produced, with Japanese film producers required to submit proposals and scripts in English prior to beginning filming. The chief of CIE, David Conde, released a list of banned content in Japanese films in November 1945. This included content that praised nationalism, patriotism, feudalism, cruelty and immoral violence. For example, the depiction of katana (traditional Japanese swords wielded by samurais) were banned as Occupation officials saw them as symbols of feudalism. In contrast, other violent weapons like guns in American Westerns were permitted, since they were allegedly used “only to defend justice and restore safety to their communities.” Even foreign films like the American-produced Mark of Zorro were subject to deletion of swordplay scenes.

Similarly in the theater industry, 322 of 518 classic plays such as kabuki reviewed by censors had been banned by December 1945 “because they contained one or more of such objectionable themes as glorification of feudal ideology or militarism, blind loyalty, a cheap valuation of human life, relegation of women to a subservient status in society, and glorification of revenge.” As a result, the Kabuki theater companies (which centered around themes of loyalty and revenge which Occupation censors considered as tied to militarism and therefore inappropriate) were most impacted, with 2,500 prints destroyed by SCAP.

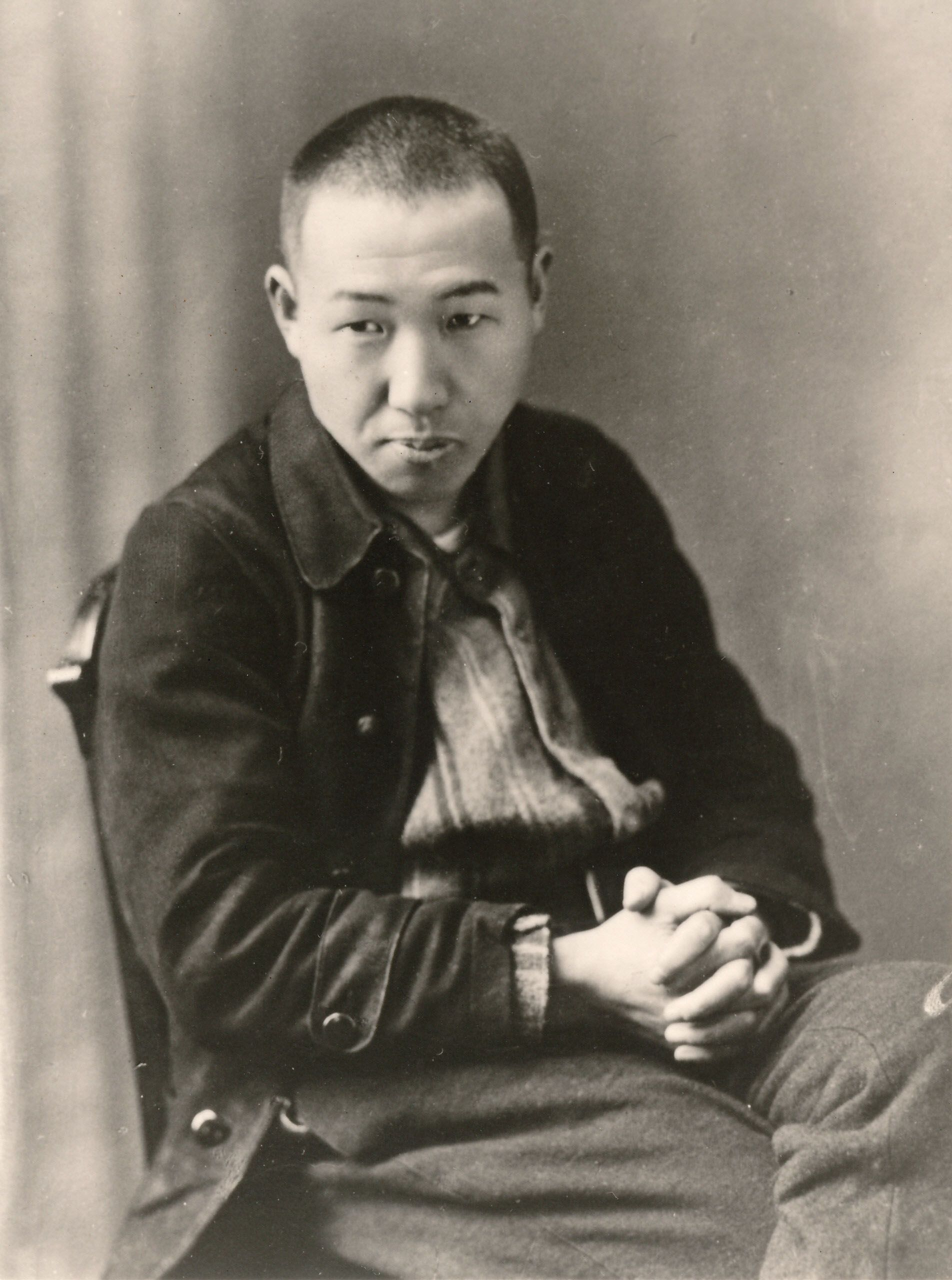
Miyazawa Kenji, a children's novelist and poet who saw his works censored during the CCD's tenure.

Children's literature was also subject to censor. For example, the 1932 children's story “The Ants and the Mushroom” by Miyazawa Kenji, was ordered deleted because of a “militaristic expression” where the ants were soldiers, although there were no fighting scenes in the book. The plot (an ant soldier falling asleep and being surprised by the sudden appearance of a mushroom) actually subtly made fun of the military, rather than promoting Japan's wartime imperialist ambitions in the East.

Beyond the suppression of feudal themes, censoring “leftist propaganda” was also a major aim as part of the American policy of containment. Before mid-1947, criticism of the Soviet Union was banned as they had been a U.S. ally at the end of WWII, although this changed during the beginning stages of the Cold War. In 1950, General Douglas MacArthur pushed for the Red Purge in Japan in the wake of the Korean War. The Red Purge is distinct from the White Purge pursued by SCAP officials, which targeted conservative ultranationalists (e.g.war criminals, former governors of occupied territories, militarists), forbidding them from holding public office.

However, the General Headquarters undertook great efforts to conceal the censorship. This, ironically, was to support America's role as a model of democracy. Mentioning the Occupation forces as a commanding authority constituted a censorship violation since it clashed with the American narrative that “democratization was proceeding independent of the Occupation.” For example, a report on the production of typhus fever vaccines ordered by SCAP was deleted.

== Affected media ==
=== Documenting the nuclear bombs ===
Kurihara Sadako, a hibakusha survivor of the Hiroshima nuclear bomb, had her poetry collection that addressed the aftermath of the bomb heavily censored. According to scholar Edward A. Dougherty, "American Censors deleted stanzas and whole poems from the book before publication and because of an earlier run in with Occupation Officials, she herself cut additional materials out". The collection would later be republished in its uncensored format in 1986. Because of the censorship conducted by the CCD, hibakusha experience was not publicized and faced discrimination. Bomb survivors, such as Ogawa Setsuko, recount being discriminated against by doctors believing their radiation to be contagious, being hidden and isolated in family homes, and ostracized by the public. Simultaneous to the ostracization hibakusha were experiencing, U.S scientists were collecting evidence at institutions studying hibakusha but refusing to treat them. Some poems about the bomb, such as Kurihara's “Let Us Be Midwives”, was able to evade censorship as it was published directly after the bombing, and the criteria the CCD used to censor was largely up to interpretation.

Documentary company Nichi-ei promptly sent cameramen to the site of the two atomic bombings to record footage, the surviving footage that made it to American censors was filmed by Toshio Kashiwada. The film was released, but CCD officials such as C.B. Reese recommended the film be withdrawn from public circulation, but ultimately the CCD allowed it to run due to the difficulty of censoring an already released film and the bad press it would receive.

=== Film ===
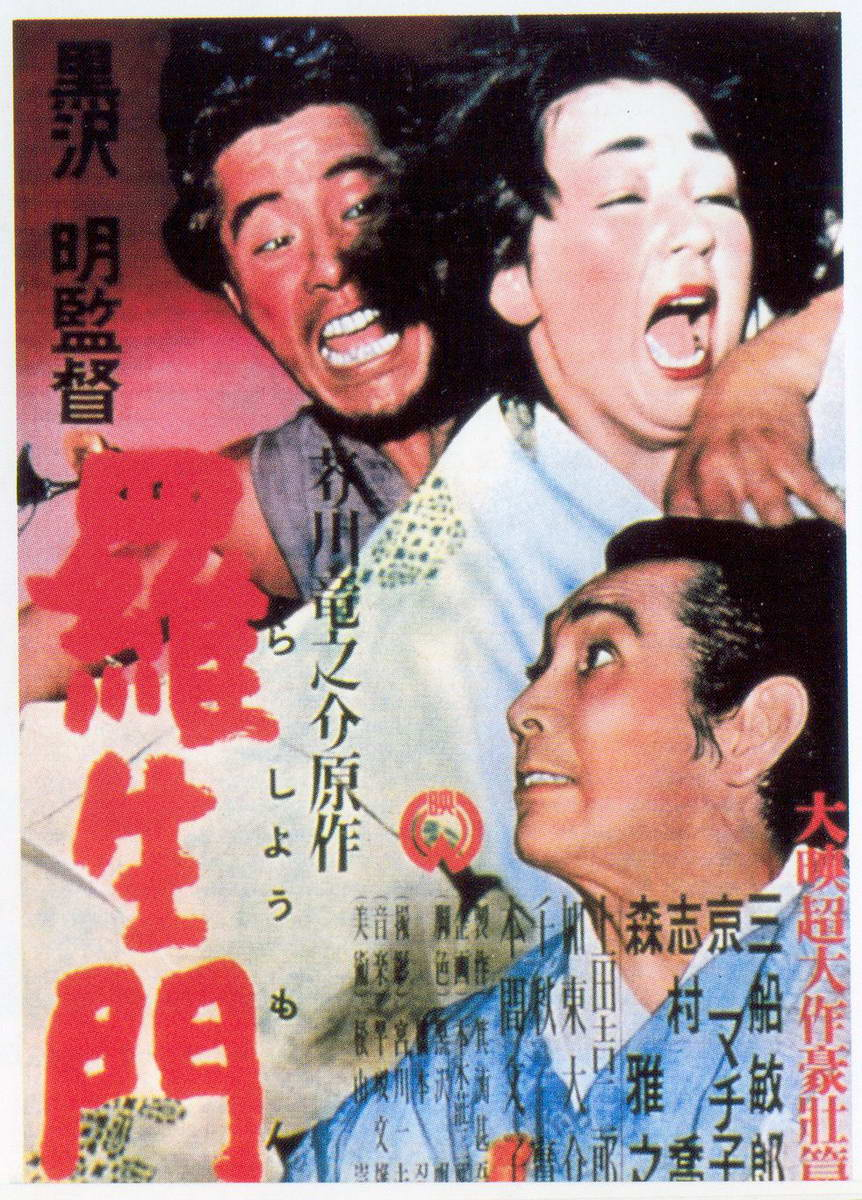
Poster of Akira Kurosawa's Rashomon (1950).

Film in the time of American occupation was under much scrutiny. One of the earliest instances of film censorship was August of 1945, where a Japanese film crew took documentary images of Hiroshima and Nagasaki. A film was later released but with several censors dictated by the CCD. Films were reviewed in all stages of production, from synopsis, screenplay, and completed film. When the film was finished, CCD officials would view it in its first screening sessions, and there military censors would check for violations of its pictorial code. After viewing, the censors would either “pass the film for release, pass it with deletions, or suppress it” all together. The suppressed films were not returned to their owners, but the CCD was careful not to destroy them entirely. The objectionable sections were studied by the CCD to deepen knowledge on Japan's history, culture, strategy, language, and geography, then destroyed all copies of the film save a negative and two prints.

There were films critical of American occupation that were able to be released, avoiding the censors. This was done by creating a jidaigeki film, a film set in Japanese history but with modern day criticisms and themes. Originally, For film director Akira Kurosawa, he made a jidaigeki resulting in Rashomon (1950), during a period where many films were set in a contemporary time period, so by setting a film in the distant past he was able to reassert a Japanese identity to film. Kurosawa recounts in his autobiography a preference for the American censorship he felt over the Japanese censors. Prior, the Japanese film industry experienced a decade of censorship on the requirement of the military government, Kurosawa describing this time as “an age that had no respect for creation”. His description of American censors juxtaposes this, stating “they all behaved toward us in a gentlemanly fashion. Not a single one among them treated us as criminals, the way the Japanese censors had.”

=== Media reports ===
Mentions of crimes committed by Allied soldiers were not allowed to be reported on by media publications. In order to report on these, magazines and papers had to use euphemisms to describe the perpetrators of crimes being occupied soldiers, for example, “the criminals were unusually tall and hairy men”. Documentation of crimes committed by American soldiers are limited due to the stringent restrictions on press accounts of GI criminality placed by the CCD. These crimes however, were uncommon and condemned by the US military.

== Response from Japanese citizenry and lasting effects ==
Due to the extremely secretive nature of US-led censorship in Japan, few people knew that censorship existed. Its existence was kept secret, and the only ones aware of it were those directly in contact with the censors - writers, editors, and journalists. However, its inner workings have influenced the landscape of post-war Japan leaving a lasting impact on its society.

=== Westernization of Japanese society ===
The most influential outcome of censorship concerned the change in Japanese people's perception of Americans at large. Before the US occupation forces arrived in Japan, many Japanese tended to want to avoid any contact with the "American beast" that according to wartime propaganda and rumors would rape, torture, and murder the conquered people. However, as censorship of media and propaganda began to toll, the negative perception of Americans, too, began to change. Articles celebrating the success of occupation forces were published, while negative opinions were deliberately left out. The media covering encounters between Japanese and Americans often portrayed American people as “lightheartedly childish, gullible, naive, yet carefree, down-to-earth, cheerful, amusing, easy”, hence representing a turning point in the representation of Americans in Japan. By early 1946, General MacArthur began to receive various letters from Japanese citizens supporting Japan-US cooperation, with some going as far as to ask for the US annexation of Japan as it is “the only way to save a drowning Japan.”

Additionally, a number of censorship policies have contributed to westernizing Japanese society and expose Japanese people to Western societal ideals, such as beauty standards and fashion trends. In addition to censorship, the occupiers “regularly planted articles, photographs, and other items in the Japanese press,” which included pro-American propaganda highlighting the glamour of American culture. Women's magazines such as Sutairu and Sutairu To Dezain encouraged Japanese women to idolize American beauty standards, arguing that the readers would be able to have a physique similar to that of American women if they followed a Western diet and undergo cosmetic procedures on the eyes. These tactics aided American reconstruction, as they encouraged Japanese women to follow Western fashion trends and increasingly dress in Western attires drawing them closer to the West. A number of critics voiced their concern about this trend, several articles criticized the standards of American beauty as inferior to that of Japanese arguing that kimono will make a comeback to the fashion trend of Japanese women. However, American ideals of beauty continued to have a presence in Japanese society even after the occupiers left Japan, with cosmetic companies popularizing face powders “reminiscent of Caucasian skin.”

=== Information barrier in Japan ===
Amid these grand transformations of Japanese society and its people, the censorship completely isolated Japanese people from the rest of the world. As the censorship policies aimed at “[drawing] a ring around Japan through which no unauthorized information slipped, either to or from Japan,” Japanese people had very limited knowledge of global affairs during the time, nor were they allowed to inform the world of what was happening in their country. The same went for the people of the rest of the world. The majority of foreign correspondents in Japan at the time were Americans and had to be accredited by the Occupation authorities, thereby severely limiting the world's knowledge of Japan under American occupation.

=== Effects on atomic bomb victims ===
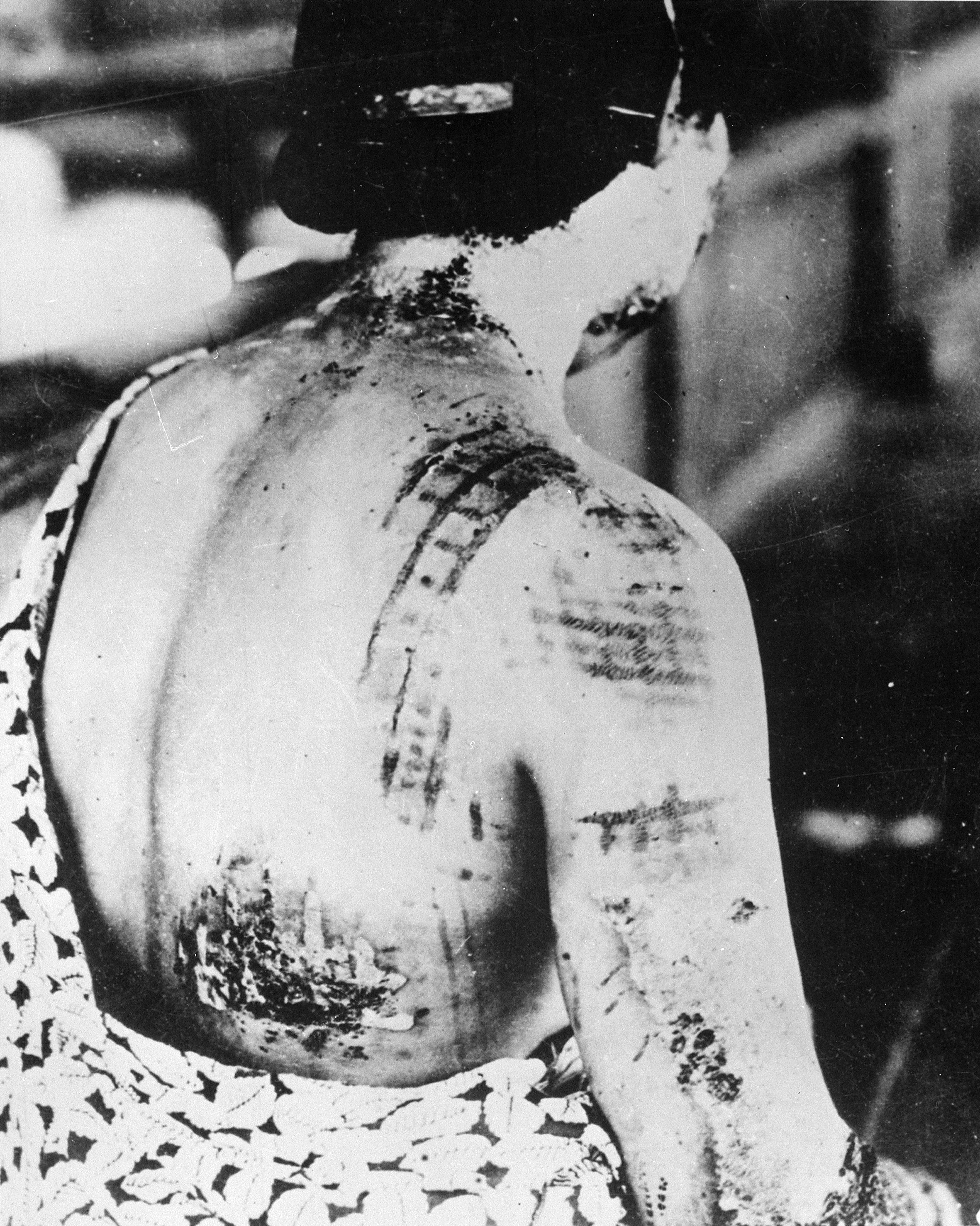
A hibakusha, her kimono pattern burned into her skin.

The censorship regarding the nuclear bombing in Hiroshima and Nagasaki has particularly had a devastating impact on its survivors, such as the hibakusha. As the censorship produced an informative gap in what the Japanese people knew about the atomic bomb, many Hibakusha suffered from severe discrimination, poverty, and loneliness amid ignorance about the incident. Not only were Hibakusha discriminated against in the workplace but also in marriage, as the survivors, especially women, were thought to be prone to have deformed children. The fact that many Hibakusha chose to keep their status secret due to the widespread discrimination made them unable to access the necessary medical care and further isolated them, ultimately leaving the survivors to live in constant fear. The censorship also made it impossible for not only the Japanese but also the world to comprehend the full extent of the dangers of using nuclear weapons. Everyone, including the Japanese, Americans, and the world, were exposed to limited pieces of information, unable to grasp the full picture.

=== Lasting influence on Japanese society ===
While the censorship came to a close with the end of the occupation on April 28, 1952, it continued to have a lasting impact on Japanese society and its press. Even after Japan recovered its independence, the press continued to maintain a cautionary attitude in their coverage of the Establishment, which rendered the role of the press as an ineffective watchdog in post-treaty Japan. The government closely regulates the release of state information through the exclusive press clubs operated by each ministry and can deny access to reporters who stray too far from the official line. The press also remains cautious in its stance toward both the United States and the United Nations, as few mainstream news organizations question Japan's political and diplomatic ties to the United States and its commitment to the United Nations to this day.

Historian John W. Dower argues that the US censorship in occupied Japan has shaped the Japanese political consciousness by enforcing the continued socialization in the acceptance of authority and the sense that ordinary people are unable to influence the course of events: “So well did they succeed in reinforcing this consciousness that after they left, and time passed, many non-Japanese including Americans came to regard such attitudes as peculiarly Japanese.”

== See also ==
- Censorship in Japan
- CIA activities in Japan
