= Gordon W. Prange Collection =

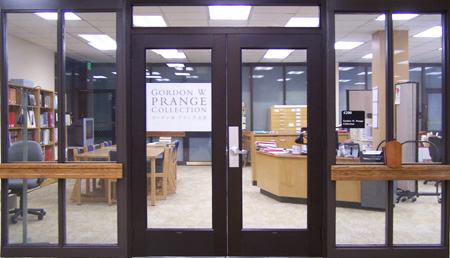
- Gordon W. Prange Collection, Hornbake Library North, University of Maryland
- Location: Hornbake Library North, Room 4200, 4130 Campus Drive, University of Maryland College Park, MD 20742-7011

Other information
- Website: www.lib.umd.edu/prange

The Gordon W. Prange Collection (/præŋ/) is the most comprehensive archive in the world of Japanese print publications issued during the early years of the Occupation of Japan, 1945–1949. The Collection is located in Hornbake Library at the University of Maryland.

== History ==
Dr. Gordon W. Prange, a professor of history at the University of Maryland, worked as Chief of General Douglas MacArthur's historical staff between 1946 and 1951 during the Occupation of Japan. When censorship of the Japanese media by the Civil Censorship Detachment (CCD) was lifted, Dr. Prange arranged for the shipment of the CCD materials to the University of Maryland. The materials arrived at the university in 1950. In 1978, the Board of Regents of the University of Maryland passed a motion to name the collection the "Gordon W. Prange Collection."

== Holdings ==
The holdings of the Prange Collection once constituted the files copies of the Civil Censorship Detachment (CCD). Two copies of print publications were submitted to the CCD for censorship review. One copy was retained by the CCD, and one copy was returned to the publisher or author with instructions for revisions. The Prange Collection also holds several gift collections, including Charles L. Kades' drafts of the Japanese Constitution of 1947.

The holdings are:

- 71,000 book and pamphlet titles
- 13,800 magazines titles
- 18,000 newspaper titles
- 10,000 news agency photos
- 640 maps
- 90 posters
- 140 ephemera items
- Gift collections

== Preservation ==
Between 1992 and 2001, the University of Maryland Libraries partnered with the National Diet Library (NDL) to microfilm the Prange magazines and newspapers. In 2005, the digitization of the Prange books and pamphlets began. Phase One consisted of the scanning of the 8,000 children's books in the Prange Collection, which was completed in 2010. Phase Two began that same year with the scanning of the books in the social sciences, including political science, economics, and history. Currently, education-related books are being scanned.

== See also ==
- Occupation of Japan
- Postwar Japan
- Gordon Prange
- Censorship in Japan
- Supreme Commander for the Allied Powers
