= Street of Violence =

Bōryoku no machi
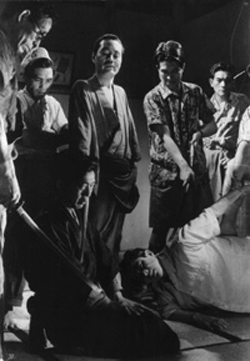
- Directed by: Satsuo Yamamoto
- Written by: Yasutarō Yagi; Yūsaku Yamagata
- Starring: Ryō Ikebe; Akitake Kōno
- Cinematography: Eikichi Uematsu
- Edited by: Akikazu Kono
- Music by: Ichirō Saitō
- Distributed by: Daiei
- Release date: February 26, 1950 (Japan)
- Running time: 111 minutes
- Country: Japan
- Language: Japanese

Street of Violence (暴力の街, Bōryoku no machi), (Note: While mostly credited as Bōryoku no machi (暴力の街), some sources give the original title as Pen itsuwarazu bōryoku no machi (ペン偽らず 暴力の街).) also titled City of Violence and Street of Violence (The Pen Never Lies), is a 1950 Japanese crime and drama film directed by Satsuo Yamamoto. Its story is based on a reportage published in the newspaper The Asahi Shimbun.

== Plot ==
In the city of Tōjō, news reporter Kita is first insulted by local boss Onishi and later threatened by gangsters after an article on corrupt businessmen, officials and authorities. Bureau chief Sagawa withdraws Kita for his and his family's protection and instead sends a group of colleagues to Tōjō to investigate. Aided by a group of organised young people and formerly intimidated citizens, who are weary of the ongoing corruption and violence, the reporters can finally expose the schemings. In the closing voice-over, the narrator cautions the audience to stay attentive to prevent a return of the depicted violence.

== Cast ==
- Ryō Ikebe as Kawasaki
- Akitake Kōno as Enomoto
- Masao Mishima as Onishi
- Hajime Izu
- Miki Sanjō as Tazuko, Kita's sister
- Yasumi Hara as Kita
- Hatae Kishi as Harue
- Masao Shimizu as Okano
- Eitarō Ozawa
- Takashi Shimura as Sagawa
- Jūkichi Uno as Natsume
- Taiji Tonoyama
- Osamu Takizawa as Prosecutor Togami

== Background ==
Street of Violence was produced by a production committee established especially for this film, which included the Japan Film Workers Union. Among the cast were actors under contract with the studios Toho, Shōchiku and Daiei, and independent film and theatre actors. It was shot on location where the actual events, which became known as the "Tōjō incident", had taken place.
