= University of Maryland Libraries =

Academic library in Maryland, United States

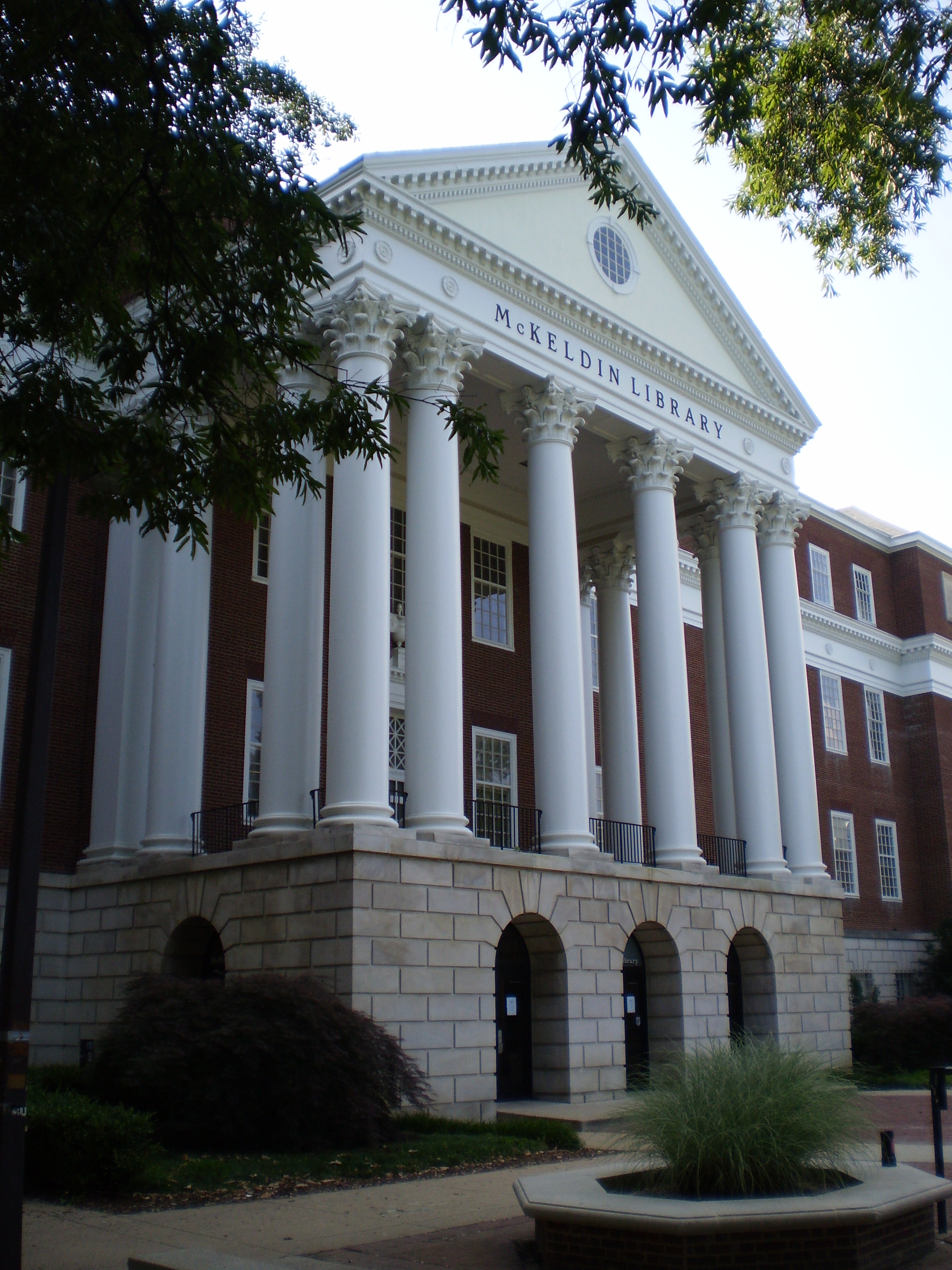
- McKeldin Library, the main branch of the library system
- Location: College Park, Maryland, United States
- Type: Academic library
- Branch of: University of Maryland, College Park
- Branches: 8

Collection
- Size: 4,094,341 volume

Access and use
- Population served: 46,000

Other information
- Director: Adriene Lim, Dean of Libraries
- Website: www.lib.umd.edu

The University of Maryland Libraries is the largest university library system in the Washington D.C.–Baltimore area. The system includes eight libraries: six are located on the College Park campus, while the Severn Library, an off-site storage facility, is located just outside campus, and the Priddy Library is located on the University System of Maryland satellite campus in Shady Grove.

The UMD Libraries are a key academic resource that supports the teaching, learning, and research goals of the university. The various materials collected by the libraries can be accessed by students, scholars, and the general public. The libraries feature 4 million volumes and a substantial number of e-resources (including more than 17,000 e-journal titles), a variety of archives and special collections, and a host of technological resources which enable remote online access to the Libraries' holdings and services. They are members of both the Big Ten Academic Alliance (BTAA) and the University System of Maryland and Affiliate Institutions (USMAI). As of December 2012, the libraries were ranked 10th in electronic resources as a percentage of total library materials by the 115-member Association of Research Libraries.

== History ==
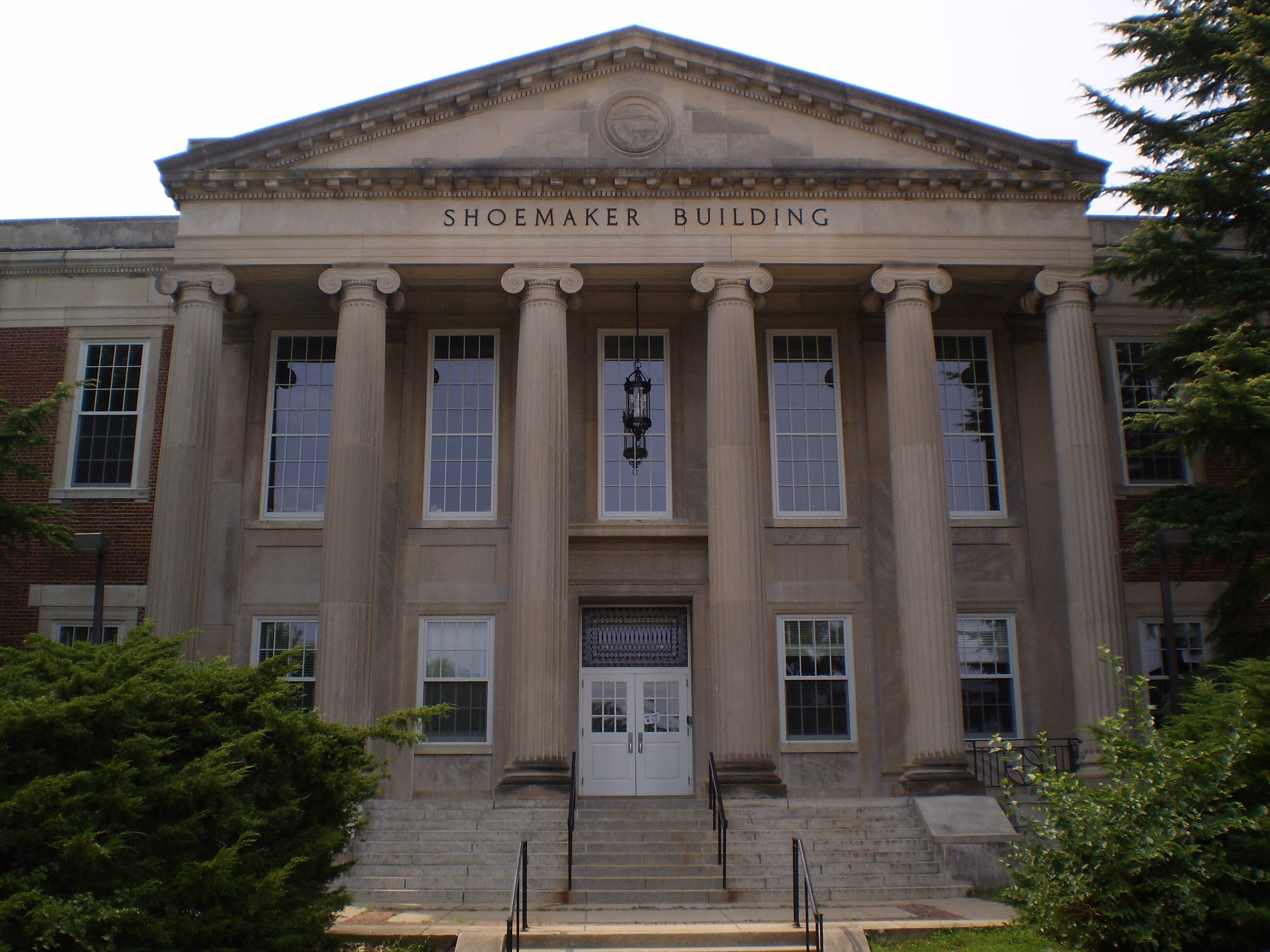
The Shoemaker Building, formerly the campus library

A library/gym building was constructed on campus in 1893, which survived the Great Fire of 1912; the building, which stood where Tydings Hall now stands, was razed in 1958. A new library building, called Shoemaker Library (now known as the Shoemaker Building), was constructed in 1931 (named for Samuel M. Shoemaker, chairman of the Board of Regents from 1916 to 1933), and served as the university's main library until the construction of McKeldin Library in 1958.

The university's library became a Federal depository library in 1925, a status it has held since. In 1965, the library system became the Regional Depository for Maryland, Delaware, and the District of Columbia.

== Administration ==
The Office of the Dean serves as the executive administrative unit of the University of Maryland Library system, headed by the Dean of Libraries. Adriene Lim, PhD, began as Dean of Libraries on August 19, 2019. She succeeds Babak Hamidzadeh who served as Interim Dean of the Libraries starting in July 2015 after the retirement of Patricia Steele. Reporting to the Dean of Libraries are five additional administrative units, each led by an associate dean or director: Administrative Services, the Collection Strategies & Services division (CSS), the Digital Services and Technology division (DST), the Strategic Communication and Outreach Office, and the Research and Academic Services division (RAS).

The Library Assembly (LA) is primarily an advisory council for the Dean of Libraries and LMG (Library Management Group). Faculty, staff, students, and administrators are all free to participate in the Library Assembly meetings. Voting membership of the assembly consists of library faculty, elected staff representatives, and elected graduate assistant representatives.

== McKeldin Library ==
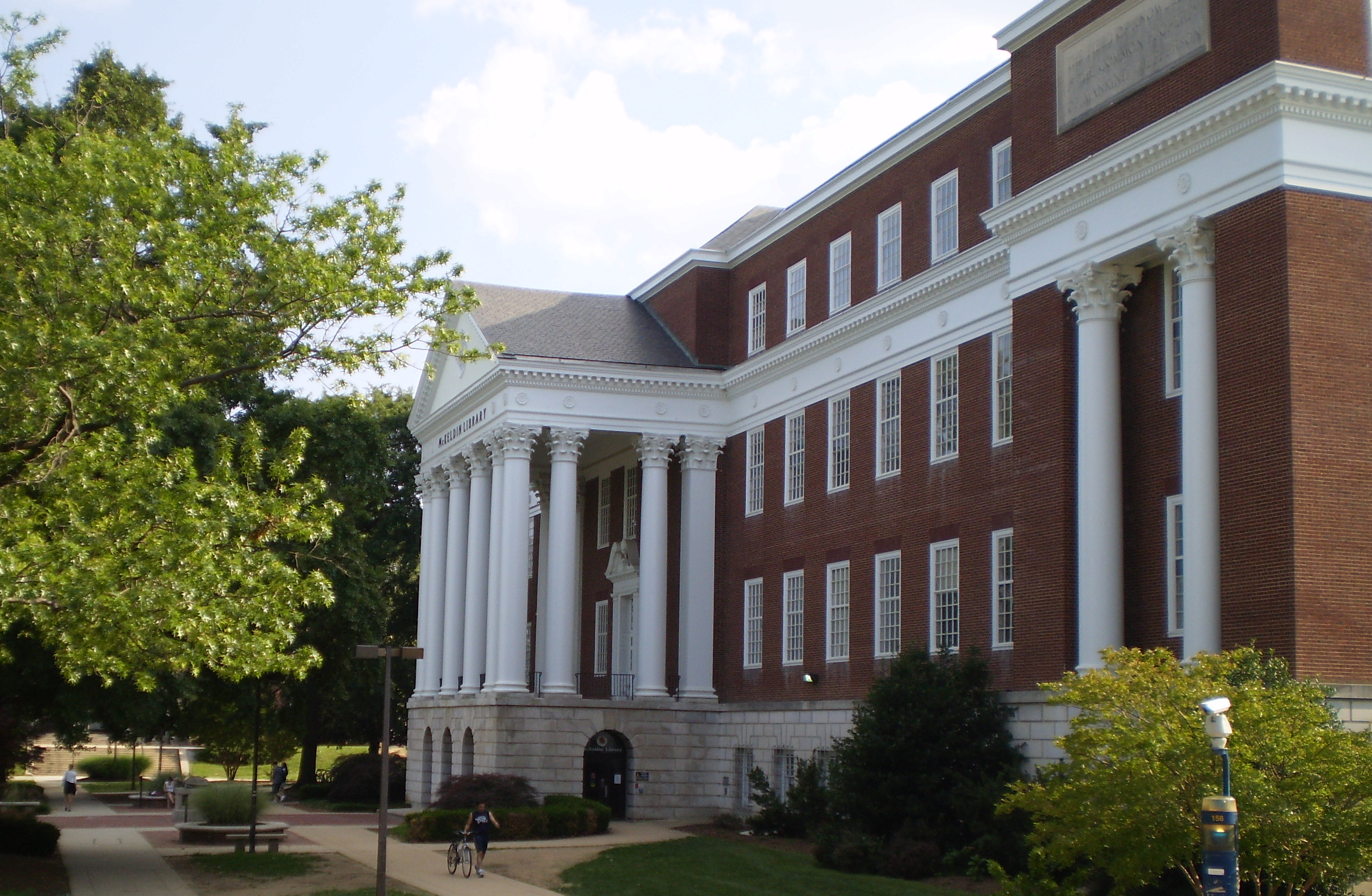
McKeldin Library

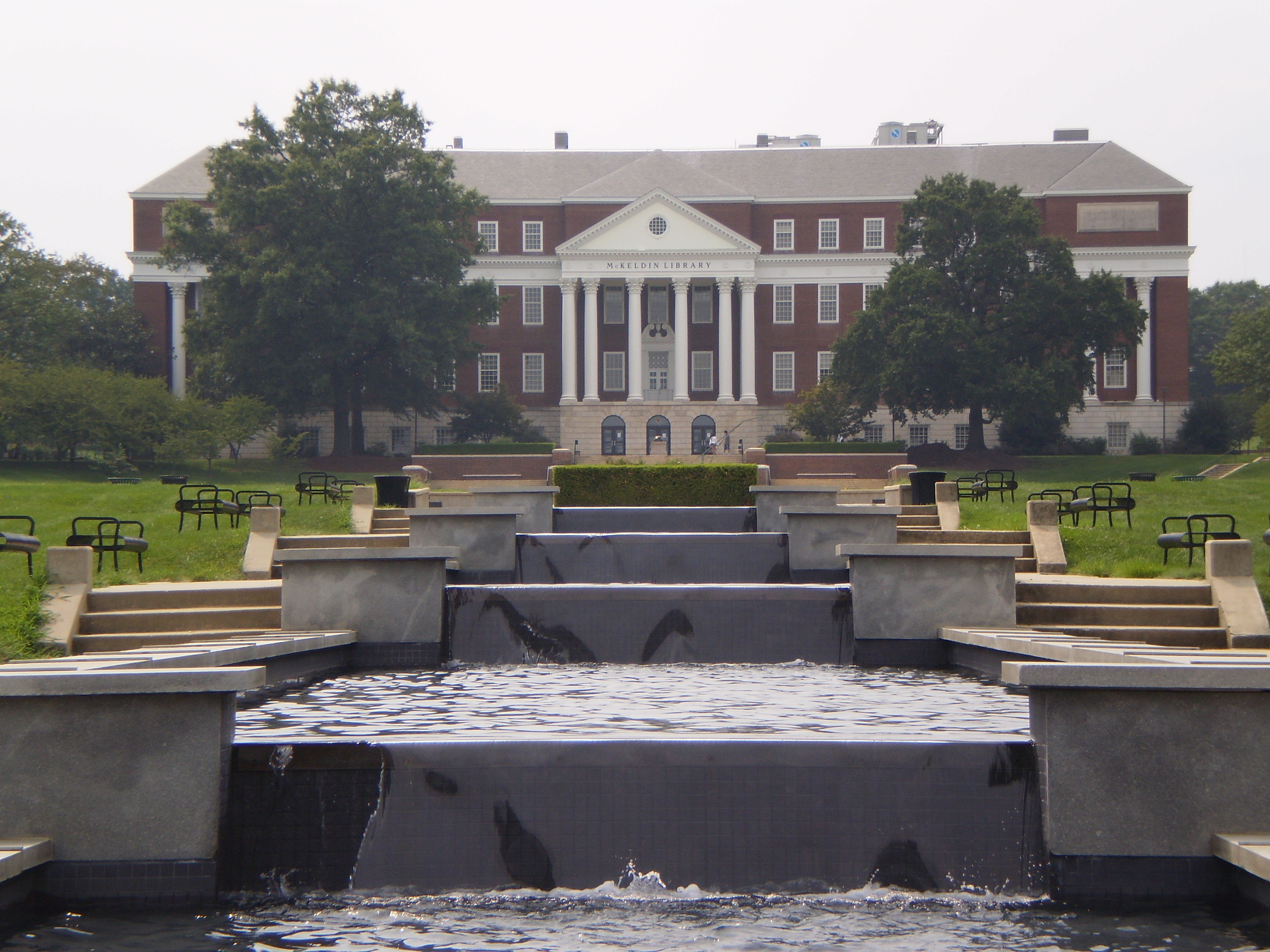
Front view of McKeldin

McKeldin Library is the main branch of the University of Maryland Library system. Constructed in 1958, the building is named for Theodore McKeldin, the former Governor of Maryland. Located at the western end of McKeldin Mall, the Library is one of the largest buildings on campus. It is home to a number of collections, including the university's General Collection and the East Asia Collection. McKeldin Library also serves as a regional Federal depository library, housing a collection of United States government documents, along with GIS and Data Services. Also housed in the library are several computer labs, a Tech Desk, and Footnotes Café.

McKeldin Library remains open to students, faculty, and staff on a 24/5 schedule most of the Fall and Spring semesters (from 11am Sunday morning to 8pm Friday night), in order to provide late night study hours for university students; A UMD (College Park) identification card is necessary to gain access to the building during the late night study hours (after 11pm and before 8am).

=== Terrapin Learning Commons ===
Former Dean of Libraries Patricia Steele announced plans to gut the second floor of McKeldin during the summer of 2010 in order to make room for a new "Terrapin Learning Commons" (commonly referred to as the TLC). Steele hoped to "reevaluate" all seven of the library's floors, with the ultimate goal of (gradually) transforming McKeldin into a study-oriented, laptop-friendly central library for the university, and perhaps creating a floor specifically designed for graduate students. The new laptop-friendly learning commons opened for the Fall 2011 semester, with plans to add multimedia workstations and lockers which can recharge laptops in between classes. A graduate-only study room opened later during the fall semester.

In September 2012, the TLC expanded to include a Tech Desk, which provides a variety of services, including equipment loan and specialized printing support.

== Hornbake Library ==
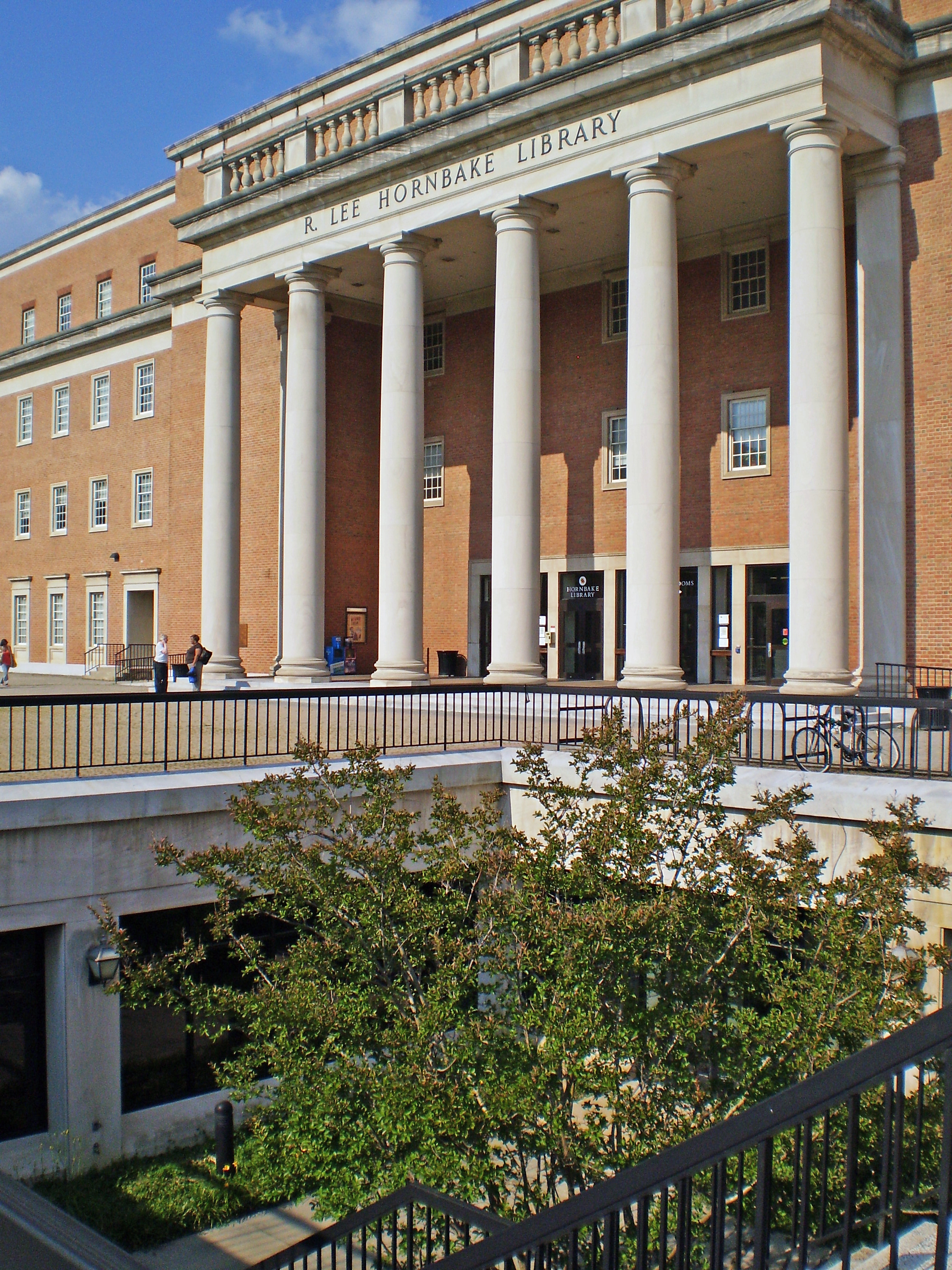
Hornbake Library

Constructed in 1972 as a separate undergraduate library, Hornbake Library was named in 1980 for R. Lee Hornbake, the former Academic Vice President of the University of Maryland. The building was repurposed as repository for special collections, and now Hornbake Library is home to the College of Information Sciences, the Human-Computer Interaction Lab, the Gordon W. Prange Collection (a collection of Japanese print publications issued during the early years of the Occupation of Japan, 1945–1949), the Katherine Anne Porter Room, and the Maryland Room, which houses Special Collections and University Archives. In September 2012, the Maryland Institute for Technology in the Humanities (MITH) moved to a new space in Hornbake Library, having been previously located in the basement of McKeldin Library. Hornbake Library is located in Hornbake Plaza, which sits east of the Adele H. Stamp Student Union. Since 1973, Hornbake Library had been the home of Library Media Services which lent non-print media, including DVDs and production equipment, but in June 2019, the Provost, Mary Ann Rankin, and Dean of the College of Information Studies, Keith Marzullo, announced that the space would be repurposed as a space for the College of Information Studies' faculty and students. While UMD Libraries now only staff the special collections areas, there are a variety of self-serve study spaces available throughout Hornbake Library.

== Architecture Library ==
Located in the School of Architecture, Planning, and Preservation, the library's collection areas include architectural history, design, and theory, as well as historical preservation, landscape architecture, real estate development, and urban studies and planning.

The Architecture Library is currently a "print limited" library, meaning they will continue to retain their current print materials, but their new acquisitions shall primarily be e-resources. This new policy is part of their strategy to become the model 21st century library for Sustainability in the Built Environment.

== Michelle Smith Performing Arts Library ==
Michelle Smith Performing Arts Library opened in 2000 as part of the Clarice Smith Performing Arts Center and is home to the university's music, theatre, and dance materials; the collection includes 56,000 books, 156,000 musical scores, 130,000 audio and video recordings, 4,500 microfilm titles, and 281 active journal subscriptions.

The library's public areas include a large main reading room with individual study carrels, a separate reading room for special collections, a lounge-style study room, a seminar room, and a study room. Connecting the library to the Smith Center's Grand Pavilion is the multi-media exhibitions gallery, with an adjacent lecture/concert room.

=== Special Collections in Performing Arts ===
In addition to the general collections, the Michelle Smith Performing Arts Library is home to the Special Collections in Performing Arts (SCPA). Special collections preserves and provides access to primary source materials on music, dance, and theater, with special interest in local performing groups and movements. Some highlights include Jim Henson Works, the Liz Lerman Dance Exchange Archives, the Viola da Gamba Society of America Archives, and the American Composers Alliance Score Collection. SCPA is the repository for several professional organizations, including the National Association for Music Education, the American Bandmasters Association, and the Music Library Association. It is known as a significant repository of materials on the D.C. punk scene.

=== International Piano Archives at Maryland (IPAM) ===
The Michelle Smith Performing Arts Library also holds the International Piano Archives at Maryland (IPAM); a collection of materials for the study, appreciation, and preservation of the classical piano repertoire and its performance. Founded in 1965 by Albert Petrak and Gregor Benko, the Piano Archives was started in Cleveland, Ohio, but the organization was soon relocated to New York City where William Santaella joined the staff. The archives quickly grew and in 1977 the International Piano Archives was given to the University of Maryland. IPAM collections consist of piano recordings, books, scores, programs and related materials, including the archival papers of many great keyboard artists.

== Other libraries ==
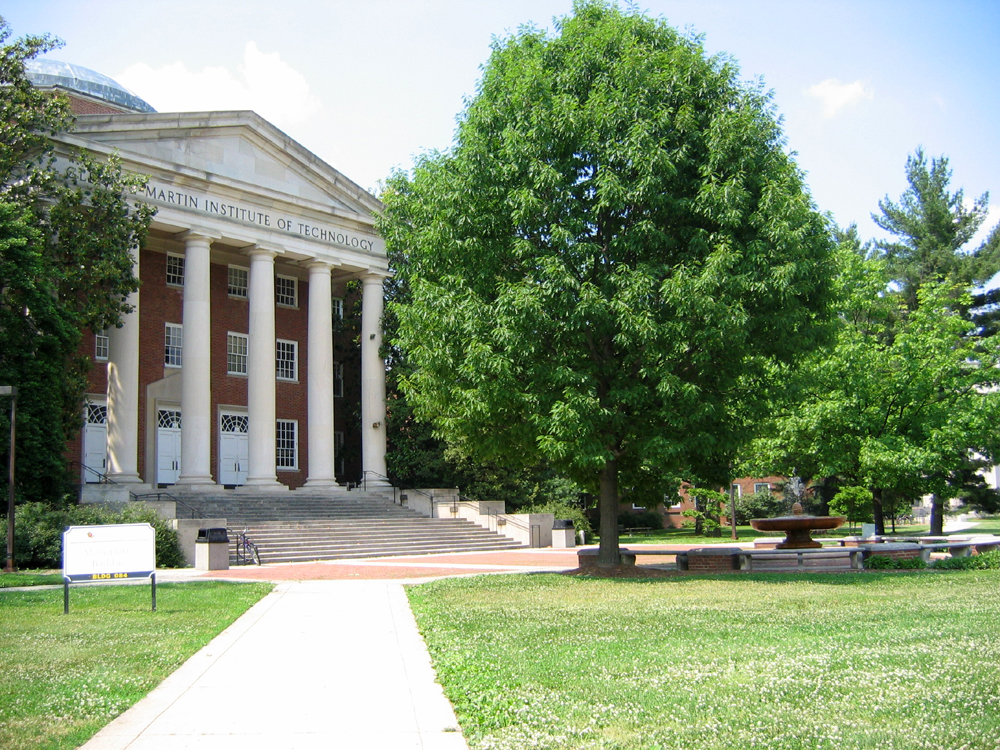
The Mathematics Building, which houses the STEM Library

The other libraries located on the University of Maryland campus include the Art Library, located in the Parren J. Mitchell Art-Sociology Building, which houses over 100,000 volumes in the areas of art history, archaeology, decorative arts and the studio arts (including photography and graphic design); and the STEM Library which was formed in January 2018 from the merging of the former Chemistry Library and the Engineering and Physical Sciences Library (EPSL). The library remains in the same location as EPSL, in the Mathematics Building, and it contains resources supporting work in engineering, computer, mathematical, and physical sciences. There are also two off-campus libraries. The Severn Library completed in 2016 and located in the off-campus Severn Building, holds about 1.25 million volumes and about 40,000 archival boxes. The Priddy Library is located in Rockville, Maryland, as a support library for the Universities at Shady Grove, a collaborative campus effort by nine institutions in the University System of Maryland.

== Criticism ==
In 2006, Maryland's Libraries were considered to be below the standards set by the university's own designated peer institutions - UCLA and University of Michigan are two such schools. Further compounding this problem was a cut in the budget of the libraries at the school. The university's student newspaper, The Diamondback, criticized this decision.

Library websites	Significant collections
University of Maryland Libraries Website; McKeldin Library; Architecture Library; Art Library; STEM Library; Hornbake Library; Michelle Smith Performing Arts Library; Severn Library; Shady Grove Library	Digital Collections; Special Collections and University Archives; University Archives; Mass Media and Culture; Library of American Broadcasting; National Public Broadcasting Archives; Maryland History; Labor History and Workplace Studies; Gordon W. Prange Collection; National Trust for Historic Preservation Library Collection; Special Collections in Performing Arts; International Piano Archives at Maryland; Katherine Ann Porter Room; U.S. Government Information, Maps, & GIS Services; East Asia Collection
