= Food during the occupation of Japan =

The United States occupation of Japan lasted from 1945 to 1952, following Japan's formal surrender on September 2, 1945, which marked the end of World War II. During this period, the Japanese government maintained the wartime rationing system to conserve resources. However, both Japanese civilian authorities and the U.S. military administration struggled to manage food distribution effectively, resulting in a severe hunger crisis. This issue significantly influenced U.S. foreign policy in East Asia, prompting American officials to intervene in efforts to address the food shortage.

== Background ==
Japanese domestic food production declined by approximately 26% during the final two years of the Pacific War, as the government redirected resources - such as fertilizers and agricultural tools - toward the war effort. As a result, farmers had limited access to essential materials for food production. In many cases, these resources were further diminished due to destruction caused by warfare. Shortages in fuel oil, which negatively impacted fishing and other aquaculture activities, along with reduced availability of fertilizers, contributed to a steady decline in the population caloric intake. Average daily caloric consumption per capita decreased from 2,000 calories before the attack on Pearl Harbor to 1,900 calories per day by 1944. This decline was further exacerbated by Allied bombing campaigns and a shrinking working- age male population, with caloric intake falling to approximately 1,680 calories per day by the summer of 1945.

Okumura Ayao, a Japanese food scholar, recalls the food crisis' impact in rural areas. He said:

From 1944 on, even in the countryside, the athletic grounds of local schools were converted into sweet potato fields. And we ate every part of the sweet potato plant, from the leaf to the tip of the root…For protein, we ate beetles, beetle larvae, and other insects that we found at the roots of the plants we picked, which we roasted or mashed. Even in the countryside, food was scarce.

This issue was compounded by the fact that Korea and Taiwan, Japan's former rice-producing colonies, were liberated at the end of the war. As a result, Japan had to depend entirely on its own yields. Poor weather led to mediocre harvests in 1944 and 1945. To make matters worse, the return of eight million expatriates from Japan's recently freed colonies added to the high demand for food.

In 1940, the Japanese government established a food rationing system for items such as vegetables, sugar, seafood, dairy goods, and rice. Rations for adults included only 1.3 to 1.8 ounces of meat and 1.8 ounces of fish a day. By 1945, this amount was reduced to 1,793 calories daily due to further restrictions. These limited rations were especially problematic in cities that relied entirely on government rations, such as Tokyo, Nagoya, Kobe, Osaka, and Yokohama.

People in provincial towns and cities who were not as dependent on the rationing system were relatively less affected, until the Allies bombed Japanese home islands in 1944. Farming families were mostly spared from hunger, since they produced their own food. However, most Japanese citizens bought food from the markets, which were contingent on the rationing system. In response, the Japanese government encouraged families to vacate cities for better conditions in the countryside. Parents sent their children to live with relatives. About 1,303,200 children were evacuated, 857,000 of which went to live with family, while the other 446,200 were taken in by Buddhist temples, inns, and local families.

Nonetheless, relocation was minimally effective, since the children still received inadequate rations in the countryside. Since these rations were continuously reduced, the food shortage persisted. From 1943 to 1945, a child's total daily rations declined from 19.2 ounces to 14.4 ounces.

A girl named Hashimoto Kumiko, who was relocated to a farm during the Pacific War, describes her experience of hunger in the book Food and War in Mid-Twentieth Century East Asia:

Day after day we ate watery gruel in the cottage of the farmhouse to which we had been evacuated. Things got even worse, and our daily chore was to gather field grasses. One day, I came across a book of Western cooking among the few remaining items on the bookshelf. I turned the pages to shiny photographs of roast beef, Spanish omelets, Scotch eggs. It became my secret pastime to stare at the beautifully taken photos and read the book over and over. I didn't care what the outcome of the war might be. I swore in my heart that when the war was over, I would eat all these dishes. Looking back on that time now, I smile ruefully that I was a hungry maiden with a big appetite.

Unlike the case in Germany, the Japanese government continued to function under essentially the same structure as was established under the Meiji constitution, even as the country came under U.S. military occupation. However, under U.S. influence those high-ranking Japanese military officials who had survived the war were quickly removed from power and, in most cases, arrested and transferred to U.S. military custody. While top Japanese political offices such as that of Prime Minister were promptly filled with Japanese civilian politicians, as a general rule for the first few years of the occupation the Emperor did little more than duly appoint the nominees of the U.S. occupation authorities. Many Japanese therefore regarded their civilian administration as little more than a puppet government and perceived a power vacuum subsequent to their defeat in the Pacific War, which was further confounded by the U.S.' occupation.

The U.S. originally sought to democratize Japan and progressively decrease the intervention of American troops over time. However, they instead chose to engage in the Reverse Course, which made the Japanese pliable to American headship in foreign trade and other affairs. The U.S. eventually hoped to convert Japan into a subsidiary, capitalist nation, and one that in particular that would retain its longstanding antipathy to communism. For the Americans, one of the key advantages of leaving a native government in place was that it allowed responsibility for food distribution to be left with Japanese officials operating under established Japanese law. To this end, the U.S. authorities upheld sanctions against outdoor food vending and preserved Japan's wartime food rationing system.

Unfortunately, neither Japanese nor U.S. authorities were able to properly regulate the trade, production, and allocation of food nationwide. A general decrease in global food production in 1945 and 1946 further added to this problem. The rations limited the average adult to 1,042 calories per day, which only constituted about 65% of the minimum caloric intake weighed necessary for basic survival. Rations were rarely delivered regularly, contributing to this problem. In some places, including Tokyo and Yokohama, rations were even cancelled. The average Tokyoite acquired only 70% of their allocated rations, which provided them with about 775 calories per day for a full six months in 1946.

== Responses ==
=== U.S. wheat donations ===
During the Occupation, the Communist Party took advantage of the hunger crisis by blaming the famine on the U.S.' maladministration in Japan.

To subvert this propaganda and prevent the formation of a Communist Asia, the U.S. sent grain and troops to foil pro-communist protests. The Koreans, in the midst of famine themselves, raised similar complaints against their government. To avoid the expansion of Asian communism, the U.S. engaged in the Reverse course by dividing foodstuffs between these two countries, sometimes limiting aid in Japan to provide for a more restive Korea. In 1946, U.S. General Douglas MacArthur (who dictated matters in all other American-occupied areas in East Asia) sent a cable to General Dwight D. Eisenhower discussing this problem. In the cable, MacArthur said:

I am considering authorizing an immediate diversion from allocation of wheat to Japan of a token shipment of twenty-five thousand tons to Korea to alleviate a serious psychological and political crisis wherein adverse leftist elements are capitalizing on the present food shortage. I am convinced that failure to provide this token shipment at once will constitute a serious threat to the United States Army Military Government in Korea.

=== School lunches ===
In 1947, U.S. authorities established school lunch programs in Japan to provide nutrition for children in the larger cities affected by the food crisis. As a result, American charities and religious organizations developed the Licensed Agencies for Relief in Asia (LARA) to dispense food, clothing, and other aid to Japan.

The school lunch programs were extended nationwide in Japan in 1951, with the intention of allotting 600 kilocalories and 25 grams of protein for each student. The lunches included a main course (usually warm) with a bread roll and a glass of milk. The bread was not donated because of its health benefits, but because Americans wanted to divest excess wheat to foreign markets to increase their profits. The milk meanwhile was chosen for its ability to quickly bolster underfed children.

=== Black market system ===
People took advantage of the hunger crisis by selling goods that were limited under the rationing system.

Criminal gang members were especially known for engaging in the black market system. Many bartered ramen, which they made from the U.S.' increased wheat exports. (Ironically, ramen was inspired by the Chinese noodle soup chuka soba.) This food was crucial during the famine, since its noodles were filling and high in calories.

The U.S. authorities tacitly overlooked the black market system by discounting the activity of large suppliers. Instead, George Solt, the author of The Untold History of Ramen, asserts that the government gave the appearance of opposing the black market by cracking down on individual vendors and consumers. Historian John Dower claims that 1.22 million average men and women were jailed for acquiring goods from the black market in 1946. This number escalated to 1.36 million in 1947, and again to 1.5 million in 1948. Solt raises the possibility that the police and government elites received a portion of the profits from the illegal food trade, which explains their motives for quietly accepting the black market. This point supports evidence that corrupt officials contributed goods to this trade.

== Food culture after the Occupation period ==
A food amusement park, the Shin-Yokohama Rāmen Museum, was established in the Shin-Yokohama district of Kōhoku-ku, Yokohama, Japan in 1994 and is largely dedicated to ramen. However, George Solt conveys that this monument has overstated the Japanese returnees' part in commercializing chuka soba, ignoring the Korean and Chinese laborers in Japan that vended chuka soba on the black market. More significantly, the museum disregards chuka soba as a Chinese creation, treating it as a Japanese specialty. For instance Momofuku Ando, the Osaka-based inventor of instant ramen and founder of Nissin noodles for example, was a Taiwanese-born immigrant. This is often overlooked because he has a Japanese name as required for all naturalized Japanese citizens.

Ramen was mentioned widely in films, radio, music, and television shows post-occupation. In the 1954 film Bangiku (which later became known as Late Chrysanthemums) a plot line features a woman who takes her mother to a ramen restaurant to celebrate the former's wedding engagement. While the daughter happily eats the ramen, the mother is horrified, as she thinks back to the days when ramen was eaten exclusively to ward off hunger. The idea of eating it in prosperous times mortifies the mother, a theme that is found in poems and music from this period, which were recited on the radio.

One such poem (translated from Japanese) went:

"Eating nothing but ramen on a date.
With an empty wallet, yesterday and today.
The tryst was most disappointing."
