= Monpe =

Japanese work-trousers

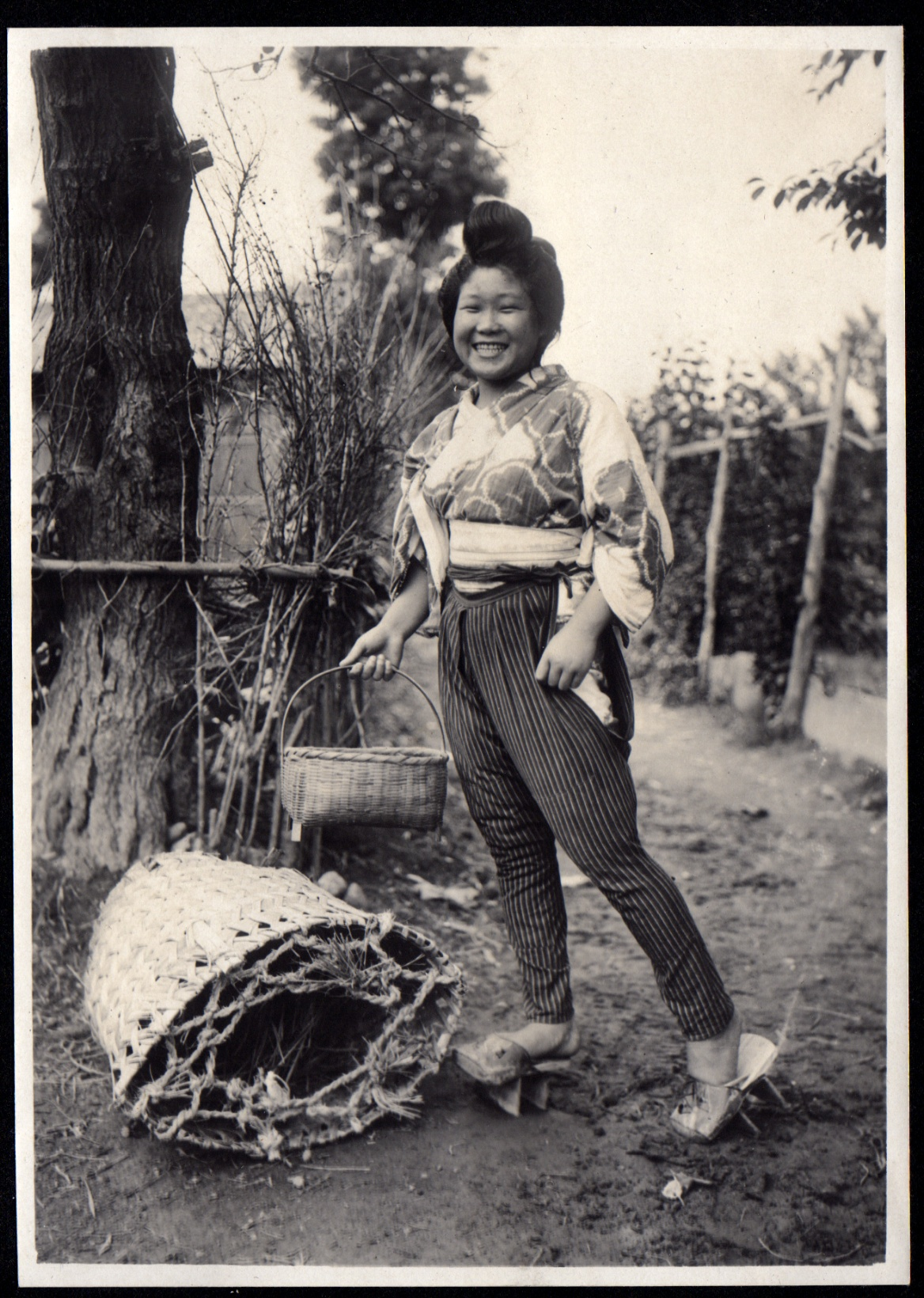
Hilton, Elstner, (1915) Woman in Kimono and Monpe with Basket

Monpe (もんぺ /モンペ) sometimes romanised as moppe or mompei, and referred to in Korean, ilbaji (see Baji), is an umbrella term for a traditional style of loose agricultural work-trouser in Japan, typically characterised by loose ankles and ties at the waist. It is most commonly worn by female labourers, especially farm workers in agricultural and mountain villages. Although traditionally the garment is very loose, it became more common through the twentieth century for women to add elastic at the ankles and waist to make it easier and more comfortable to wear. The origins of monpe is unclear, the garment is historically thought to have descended from the traditional court trousers, umanori hakama because of the loose shape of the trouser leg and how the piece of clothing is designed to also be worn over kimono. There have been historical variations linked to rural Japan referred to as yamabakama (lit. hakama for mountains) or nobakama (lit. hakama for fields).

Geographically, it has been associated with Japanese women living in the Northeastern Japanese farming countryside, such as Yonezawa, although this specificity has been questioned by historians. It is actually thought that women have been wearing variations of monpe across many areas of Japan, particularly in the Tohoku region, for centuries.

From the Shōwa period, monpe began to be popular as more women entered factory work and other physical labour in Japan's urban centres. It also became a style of Standard Dress (hyōjun-fuku) and worn as an informal uniform in Japan during the Second World War. Monpe was considered especially practical and frugal because it could be made using existing materials within the home such as kimono fabric, and could be easily altered and repaired, which was a wartime necessity and supported the government's Luxury is the Enemy! (zeitaku wa teki da) campaign. However, as it came to be worn by the majority of urban working-class women, it also transformed into a symbol of Japan's wartime deprivation. It was criticised for its unfeminine qualities, in comparison to kimono or Western-style clothing (yōfuku) which was deemed "too frivolous" in wartime.

== Design features ==
=== Construction ===
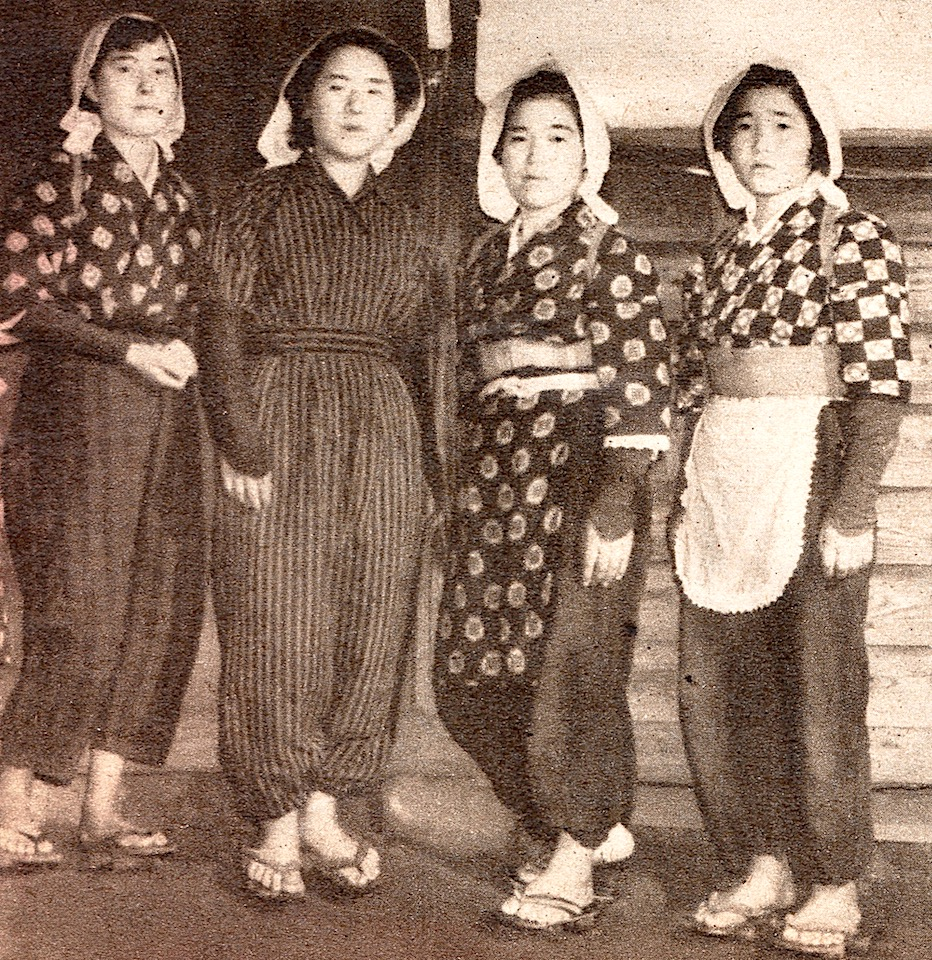
Female farmers in work clothes, Ibaraki, 1952

The main elements of the garment has a simple sewing pattern, sometimes described as a four-panel hakama, again owing to similar origins. It is made up of a front and back panel, and two side panels. There is an open side on each hip, and a total of four straps at the corners of the hips, almost identical to ones used for securing Hakama, himo, which are used to fasten around the waist in a knot. Traditionally, there is no elastic added at the ankle, but today, variations of monpe are sometimes made with elastic on the hip and ankles for added comfort and flexibility. The production of traditional monpe today continues to be labour intensive, but it has become mechanised in some parts of the process, such as weaving the fabric, and making the dye.

=== Textiles ===
As monpe is primarily a work garment, it needs to maximise the wearer's mobility and also be made from durable material. The most common and accessible material to the rural population in Edo and Meiji Japan, was cotton. Due to industrialisation of the textile industry in the Meiji period (1868–1912), Monpe can also been made from other textiles, such as wool and hemp, which are thicker and more protective during the winter. A specific type of cotton is generally used, Kasuri cotton, to create distinctive patterns in the fabric when dyed. This technique is often aligned with the Indonesian dyeing method, ikat. There are also regional variations, such as Kurume kasuri originating in Chikugo, Fukuoka, and Ryukyu kasuri in Okinawa

=== Colour, pattern and style ===
The most common and traditional colours of monpe is blue indigo. In premodern Japan, strict sumptuary laws were enacted by the Shogunate, which forbade farmers from wearing certain textiles such as silk, and colours such as purple, crimson, and plum-coloured dyes. However, one of the colours allowed was dark blue. Subsequently, rural workers began to be associated with blue clothing. While it does differ depending on region, traditionally the blue dye is contrasted with regular white geometric designs. Stripes are also used, although this pattern is considered one of the most complicated to weave. Also, there is slight variation between the stripes men and women would wear; men's stripes were woven in very narrow stripes, whereas women's stripes were wider and not so regular in spacing. Since the Taisho period (1912-1926) monpe have been made using more adventurous and brighter colour palettes, such as orange and purple, although even today indigo blue continues to be the most common.

== Origins and history ==
=== Sixth century to 1940 ===
The origins of monpe are found in hakama, which were introduced to the Japanese court around the sixth century, and primarily used as professional clothing for men. Once conceived, owing to their simple construction, monpe did not change significantly in style for centuries, and continued to be practical garments to wear during outdoor work. There is debate on when modern monpe used in urban areas first developed, with some historians such as Yi Jaeyoon arguing this was not until 1924. In the early 1930s, the ethnologist and folklorist, Kiyoko Segawa (1895–1984), travelled throughout the countryside and remote villages to study traditional rural clothing. The introduction of Western clothing after the Meiji Restoration was perceived by some as a threat to traditional, wafuku clothing, such as kimono and monpe, so efforts were made to preserve indigenous clothing. Segawa wrote 61 volumes in total, with record of three hundred versions of monpe across Japan. Around the same time, in 1930, Kimura Matsukichi, recommended monpe as the ideal work dress for women in factories. The garments discussion in high-brow fashion journals including Hifuku (Clothing) signalled its entrance into mainstream urban clothing.

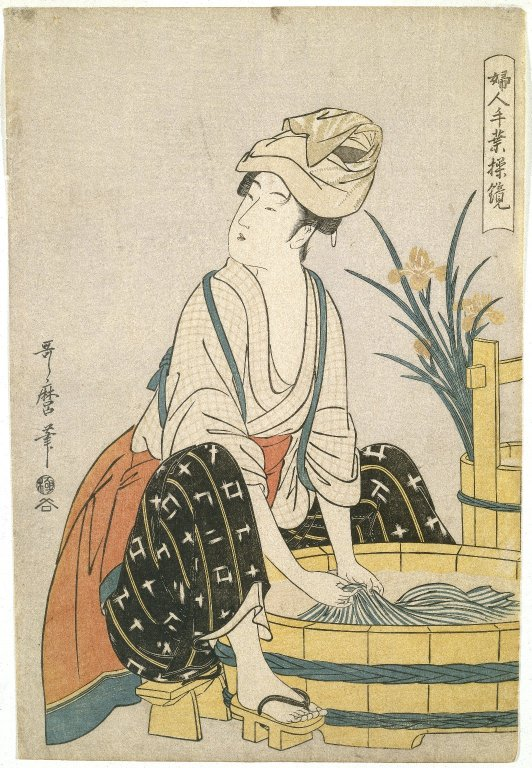
Kitagawa, Utamaro (1795), Washing Clothes (Sentaku) from Women's Handicrafts Models of Dexterity (Fujin Tewaza Ayatsuri Kagami), Brooklyn Museum

=== Pacific war ===
At the outbreak of the Second Sino-Japanese War, monpe were quick to proliferate across work and school environments. In 1942, during the Pacific War, monpe were encouraged as part of government-regulated Standard Dress (hyōjun-fuku) for women, similar to the male kokumin-fuku which had been formally introduced in 1940. In wartime, popular magazines were published which demonstrated how women could make monpe out of their old kimonos, and girls magazines such as Shōjo kurabu used monpe as a symbol of the home front. There were also a monpe workshop held at a school in Tokyo and sponsored by the Home Ministry to encourage female students to sew their own clothes. The garments utility ease of construction quickly made them a default choice for urban women, who wore it in factories, during air-raids, and as their everyday wear with old shirts and kimono. However, not everyone supported the wearing of monpe during the war for various reasons, and historians have clarified that "only monpe (loose trousers) were generally adopted, not because they were patriotic but because they were practical." Government officials, including Saito Keizō, the Minister for Welfare declared in 1939: "recycled national defense dress such as monpe is a disgrace to the nation." Soon after the war, monpe fell out of mainstream use due to its reminder of national struggle and widespread deprivation. This does not mean Japanese fashion returned to pre-war styles, as the position of kimono as a Japanese woman's everyday dress was not repaired either. It has continued to be seen as too extravagant in the postwar period, and is now only worn on formal occasions.

=== Korea ===
The experience of monpe in Korea is significantly different to Japan. In the late 1930s, monpe were distributed and enforced in colonial Korea, Taiwan, Thailand, and other occupied areas, as quick practical pieces of clothing to wear for air-raids or fires. They continue to be worn as work clothing in the postwar period, but in order to "expunge the vestiges of Japanese colonization,” the garment was renamed ilbaji, meaning 'work pants'. Monpe is now used as an "evolving meme", online and on TV in Korea. Monpe has also transformed into a positive meaning in Korean fashion, which advertises monpe as workout trousers, team uniforms, or loungewear.

== Monpe in Popular Culture ==
=== Film, anime, manga and TV shows ===
Monpe has been depicted in anime:

- Setsuko Yokokawa, the four-year old sister of Seita Yokokawa in Studio Ghibli's 1988 film, Grave of the Fireflies (Hotaru no Haka), wears a pair of blue monpe sparsely decorated with a traditional grid pattern named igeta or well-crib pattern.
- Taeko Okajima, the main character in Isao Takahata and Studio Ghibli's 1991 film, Only Yesterday (Omoide Poro Poro) is shown wearing monpe when she works on the farms during the safflower harvest in Yamagata. Taeko wears a pale green pair of monpe, with a pale blue igeta pattern. When she arrives at the farm, one of the other characters exclaims in delight:
  "Wearing work pants, too! (あれえ！モンペなんかはいて張り切ってるでねえの)
- Suzu Urano, the main character of In This Corner of the World, a 2016 film produced by MAPPA, is shown refashioning an old kimono into monpe, in a scene set in the winter of 1943 Hiroshima.
- The 1982–1983 anime series, Tonde Monpe follows the story of a maid and nanny called Monpe Hanamura, whose signature outfit is a red shirt with bright blue monpe.
- Tonde Burin is a magical girl manga series later released as anime by Nippon Animation between 1994–5. Its 15th episode, entitled "Grief of the Young Girl's Monpe" shows the main character, Karin Kokubu, wearing dark blue monpe while cleaning a riverbank.
- The Korean show Invincible Youth, airing 2009-2012, had monpe as the de facto uniform worn by female K-Pop idols, and it is still sometimes in Korean entertainment shows when the participants go to work in the countryside.

=== Video games ===
- In Animal Crossing: New Horizons (2020), the playable character can purchase "Traditional Monpe Pants" in Able Sisters for 1,040 Bells. The clothing comes in four colour variations, all with a regular cross pattern. The item is categorised in the outdoorsy/work theme.
