= Production control (industrial relations) =

Historical Japanese labour dispute tactic (1945–1950)

Production control (生産管理, seisan kanri) refers to a labour dispute tactic used in Japan in the period 1945-1950, wherein workers seized control of production at a company and managed its operations themselves to the exclusion of owners and management. It was a form of workers' self management, used as an alternative to strike action.

Production control emerged in October 1945, at the Yomiuri Shimbun newspaper. Employees at the newspaper sought to engage in industrial action, while newspaper workers were legally prohibited from striking through work stoppage by the American occupation forces. As an alternative, the union instead locked out their employers and occupied the workplace, continuing business operations themselves. As in a work stoppage strike, instances of production control were accompanied by a set of union demands, such as for increased wages. Until a settlement was reached, workers continued to produce, buy and sell as normal while excluding company management entirely. Upon settlement, occupied premises were returned to the owners.

A controversial tactic, debates over its legality were considered alongside post-war social reforms. The Japanese government under prime minister Yoshida declared it illegal in June 1946 with the support of the American occupation forces, although it remained frequently used into 1947. In 1950, the Supreme Court of Japan ruled in the Yamada Steel case that the tactic was unconstitutional, as it infringed upon the owners' right to private property.

Occupation and use of company property during industrial disputes has occurred outside of this period in Japan and elsewhere, including in factory occupations during the 1919-1920 Biennio Rosso in Italy, but the term "production control" or seisan kanri specifically originated surrounding its use in Japan in the immediate post-Second World War period.

== Methods ==
Production control was an industrial dispute tactic in which workers, instead of enacting a work stoppage as in a strike, instead locked out their employers and occupied their workplace, continuing business operations themselves. As in a typical strike, it would be accompanied by a set of union or worker demands. Until a settlement was reached, workers would continue to produce, buy and sell as normal while excluding company management entirely. During production control, workers were usually paid at increased rates out of business receipts, for instance revenue newspaper sales or streetcar fares.

The methods involved in production control are radical, as they involve workers temporarily seizing the means of production (a tenet of communism). However, after a settlement was reached in these disputes, the workplace was reliably turned back to management's control, and legal ownership was not questioned. Historian J. Moore described the tactic as "using revolutionary means for non-revolutionary ends". During these disputes, workers usually self-managed democratically, either under the auspices of a trade union or under a specially organised 'struggle committee' (闘争委員会, tōsō iinkai) which operated on the basis of direct democracy.

Most production control struggles, particularly before June 1946, were undertaken with goals such as increased wages, union recognition, and collective bargaining rights. Frequently, workers sought representation on an equitable management council or keiei kyōgikai, having an equal voice with management on key issues affecting the business. Burkett and Hart-Landsberg wrote that "Workers seized control over their enterprises not because they sought to replace management, but to force it to be more responsive."

The legal status of production control was initially ambiguous due to a lack of legislation. Despite this, historian J. Moore termed the aforementioned goals and methods 'legal' production control due to their more moderate nature. More radical forms of the strategy were applied in some cases, and workers resorted to what Moore termed 'illegal' production control when management and other businesses withheld raw materials or payment for goods produced in an attempt to suppress workers. Two key features of 'illegal' production control were its conscious repudiation of the legal limitations of capitalism, and the participants' resort to external allies and resources, criteria reflected in a contemporary legal analysis by American occupying forces.

For instance, in the 'illegal' Tōyō Gōsei production control struggle, workers sold company property to raise funds, formed a mutually beneficial barter agreement with a farmers' association, and transformed the chemical factory with new equipment and even a new product. Some of these more extravagant strategies like transporting and selling company products in the name of the union rather than of the business directly questioned private property rights. Doing this required solidarity from other workers' unions, and workplaces under workers' production control frequently collaborated with each other to enable 'illegal' production control. Moore interpreted these as the beginning of a proletarian revolution, a view shared by a minority of contemporaries; Dower described this use of the strategy as "discredit[ing] the mystique of capitalist relations of production".

== Instances of use ==
=== General trends ===
Generally, production control was used as an alternative to a strike for two key reasons: to maintain employment when layoffs were threatened, and to continue economic activity, neither of which would be accomplished by striking. The second reason was particularly important given the poor economic conditions of Japan in the immediate aftermath of the Second World War. In addition, the American occupation forces forbade strikes in a number of industries, so workers resorted to production control as an alternative.

Production control was utilised across industries and across the country, but was particularly popular in Tokyo, and in coal mines in Hokkaido and Kyushu. Several hundred industrial disputes involved production control, but the tactic was not universally successful. Prolonged periods of production control or drastic reactions from employers could raise the risk of failure, in particular posing problems in acquiring raw materials or credit, or reaching markets. In one case, a manufacturing company withdrew all materials from a factory under production control, and in the resulting absence of work the workers' action failed.

=== Yomiuri Shimbun case ===
Workers at the Yomiuri Shimbun newspaper were the first to utilise the strategy of production control in postwar Japan, and popularised the tactic throughout the country.

The newspaper was owned by Matsutarō Shōriki, a conservative who had close ties to the wartime Imperial Japanese state. As a result, workers at Yomiuri during the Second World War were responsible for omitting news unfavourable to the government, and eventually printing falsehoods in support of it. Shōriki endorsed this, and also implemented a highly authoritarian style of personnel management at the newspaper.

After the war's end, in October 1945 employees put together demands for better working conditions and for acceptance of responsibility for the war by company officials, both of which Shōriki rejected. In response, a majority of the 1,875 workers at the newspaper protested for further demands including the resignation of all company officials including Shōriki on the grounds of war guilt, which he rejected, insisting that his authority must be absolute within the company.

The Supreme Commander for the Allied Powers, or SCAP, which held ultimate political authority in Japan during the post-war occupation, prohibited newspaper workers from striking due to their important role in promoting Allied policy. In addition, striking risked the closure of the newspaper altogether, which Shōriki preferred to ceding control over it. Unable to strike, and unable to negotiate with Shōriki, the employees sought an alternative, and arrived at the idea of 'production control'. The workers were partly inspired by pre-war examples of French and Italian factory occupations.

On 25 October 1945, workers took over the editing, printing, shipping, and distribution of the Yomiuri Shimbun. They set up a series of democratically elected 'struggle committees' and organised the workplace according to direct participatory democracy. The newspaper under worker control took a progressive editorial stance, becoming the most left-leaning of the major Japanese newspapers. Its daily circulation increased up to nearly 1.7 million copies, and the struggle attracted the support of political parties the Japan Socialist Party and the Japanese Communist Party.

In December, Shōriki was forced into arbitration. On 11 December, the workers and company reached a settlement, whereby Shōriki would resign and sell his controlling stake in the company; a permanent management council would be set up where management and employees were represented equally to consult on key issues; and workers won wage increases, union recognition, and recognition of collective bargaining rights. An editorial in the newspaper the next day declared that "the Yomiuri Shimbun has been freed from this yoke of capital".

Control was handed back from workers to management after this point, but employees continued to dominate the newspaper through the union and the management council. During the struggle and afterwards, the newspaper's articles actively promoted the tactic of production control in their newspaper editorials, and supported other workers in their struggles, leading to the spread of the strategy to numerous other workplaces.

=== Keisei Dentetsu case ===
Following the example of the Yomiuri workers, another major instance of production control took place when workers took over the Keisei Dentetsu railway in December 1945. Around 2,500 workers demanded recognition of collective bargaining, a five-times wage increase, shorter working hours, resignation of some key management officers, and establishment of a joint management council with workers on. Workers initially ran the railway for free for four days when they began occupation on 11 December 1945. Management conceded to all of their demands on 29 December 1945.

=== "People's Court" incident ===
One of the more 'extreme' cases was the "People's Court" (人民裁判, jinmin saiban) incident of February 1946, where workers not only occupied their workplace but constituted themselves a war crimes tribunal for their employers.

In January 1946, the owners of the Mitsubishi coal mines in the city of Bibai in Hokkaido decided to unilaterally reduce pay to a new basic standard recommended by the government. The miners' union made a series of demands which were rejected by the company, and in February the union resorted to production control. Similarly to other instances of production control, the productivity and output of the Mitsubishi Bibai coal mines increased substantially under worker control. (Note: This trend was not universal or necessarily prolonged. In some cases, there was an initial temporary increase in productivity that was followed by a slump.) Another typicality was the fact that, inspired by the aims of the Yomiuri workers, one of the union's key demands had been inclusion in management.

After the company completely stopped negotiations, the workers took a radical step on 17 February 1946. A group of several hundred union members sought out the general manager and his deputy, and forcibly marched them through kilometres of snow to a meeting hall to restart negotiations. Miners and their families attended the 'mass negotiations', which lasted thirty-six consecutive hours. In what became known as the 'People's Court' incident, the frustrated workers and their families also tried their employers as war criminals, verbally abusing company officials until they eventually relented.

Despite the extreme nature of the case, local police did not take action. When company owners requested that SCAP intervene, the local occupation authorities who investigated refused to intervene due to the lack of open violence. The final settlement included pay hikes, recognition of labour rights, and the establishment of a management council with worker representatives.

=== Tōyō Gosei case ===
An example of what Moore described as 'illegal' production control took place at the Tōyō Gosei chemical plant in the city of Niigata from March to August 1946.

Mitsui, the owners of the Tōyō Gosei chemical plant, announced that the factory would be closed in January 1946. Employees at the plant protested this, but production was forcibly suspended in February, when owners withheld the necessary raw materials. Workers formed a union totally opposed to the closure, but the company executives successfully undercut the union by offering severance packages to those who quit the cause. More than a third of the 200-strong union acceded to this. Negotiations with the rest of the union broke down, and on 13 March 1946 company officials announced the closure of the factory regardless.

In response, the remaining employees resolved to institute production control at the site, entirely severing ties with their former employers and running the entire factory themselves. They solved the problems caused by a lack of raw materials and funds by working with a web of other unions. For instance, they raised funds by selling methanol to a Tokyo chemical factory whose workers were in the midst of a production control struggle themselves. They also formed a mutually beneficial barter agreement with a farmers' association and local coal miners whereby the farmers raised money to purchase coal and coke for the factory, and the factory in return gave farmers chemical fertilizer ammonium sulphate.

These funds were raised in the union's name rather than that of the company, preventing the company from interfering with their running of the plant. However, this was a sharp separation from 'legal' production control, normally a temporary tactic, as they had seized control of the factory entirely from the owners. In addition, workers at the Tōyō Gosei plant independently changed from one product to another, choosing to convert the factory to produce chemical fertilizer as they deemed it more necessary due to national food shortages.

Two defining aspects of the Tōyō Gosei case were workers making production decisions guided by the need of the population rather than by profit, and working with other workers and popular associations to do so independently of capitalist businesses. This more radical approach to production control represented a direct challenge to capitalism.

=== Summary data ===
By the end of April 1946, 133 disputes affecting around 100,000 workers had utilised production control as an industrial dispute tactic. It reached its zenith in May 1946 as 56 disputes involving more than 38,000 workers employed production control during the month.

Types of Industrial Dispute Actions in Japan and Workers Involved, September 1945 to February 1947 (adapted from Moore, 1985, p.11)
Month & Year	Total		Strikes		Slowdowns		Production Control		Production Control as % of Total	
Month & Year	Actions	Workers	Actions	Workers	Actions	Workers	Actions	Workers	Actions	Workers
Sep 1945	2	(Note: Data on worker numbers not available for 1945.)	2		-		-		-	
Oct 1945	20		16		3		1		5%	
Nov 1945	27		21		2		4		15%	
Dec 1945	39		33		3		3		9%	
Jan 1946	49	37,720	27	6,142	9	2,549	13	29,029	26%	77%
Feb 1946	53	29,176	23	6,532	10	6,847	20	15,806	38%	54%
Mar 1946	80	79,950	32	48,527	9	10,722	39	20,651	50%	26%
Apr 1946	89	50,417	30	14,726	6	840	53	34,815	60%	69%
May 1946	106	51,295	42	9,047	8	3,401	56	38,847	53%	76%
Jun 1946	80	26,707	29	6,735	7	1,916	44	18,056	55%	70%
Jul 1946	90	27,346	48	14,721	17	10,147	25	2,478	28%	9%
Aug 1946	107	52,282	61	24,054	18	4,983	28	23,245	26%	44%
Sep 1946	124	118,242	59	81,368	28	14,484	37	22,390	30%	19%
Oct 1946	156	200,729 (Note: The surge in strikes in October 1946 was due to the Sanbetsu union's October campaign.)	104	188,958	17	2,633	35	9,138	22%	5%
Nov 1946	127	87,488	89	76,563	14	3,262	24	7,663	19%	9%
Dec 1946	108	93,496	65	61,361	17	23,569	26	8,566	24%	9%
Jan 1947	65	26,050	30	17,491	9	2,316	26	6,243	40%	24%
Feb 1947	90	34,600	52	28,101	14	1,462	24	5,037	27%	14%

== Legality ==
The Supreme Commander for the Allied Powers, which held ultimate political power during the Allied occupation of Japan, had supported the development of independent trade unions, including as part of the wide-reaching SCAPIN-93 civil liberties directive on 4 October 1945. The first postwar Japanese government under Prime Minister Shidehara accordingly brought in the country's first Trade Union Law in December 1945, granting the right to union organisation and collective bargaining. When this Trade Union Law granted the right to strike, it was commonly interpreted that production control was also legalised, as it was seen as less harmful to the devastated postwar Japan. In September 1945, union membership nationally was just 1,147, rising to 902,751 in January 1946, and again to 4,849,329 in December 1946.

=== Four Ministry Declaration ===
As production control became increasingly widespread and disruptive, Shidehara's government sought to ban the tactic. On 1 February 1946, four government departments issued a joint policy statement called the 'Four Ministry Declaration', condemning "illegal and excessive actions" implicitly including production control. However, SCAP did not support this declaration by the Japanese executive, instead remaining neutral on the matter and insisting that the legality of production control should be determined by legislation or by courts.

In response to the Four Ministry Declaration, the influential legal scholar Suehiro Izutarō published two articles in Mainichi Shimbun titled 'The Legality and Limitations of Labor's Exercise of Management Controls' on 7 and 8 February. Suehiro argued that, within certain limitations, production control should be legal, because 'temporary control over management' was less injurious than strikes were. One SCAP official concurred with this opinion, clarifying that production control would certainly be illegal if it stepped into 'permanent management'. This statement specifically rejected the legality of workers completing financial transactions on behalf of the company, or contracting for services of supplies.

The Four Ministry Declaration provoked intense protests from left-wing groups, and a number of unions openly declared that they would defy the order. Without the support of SCAP, the government was forced to back down after a week. On 8 February 1946, the Home Ministry directed police to stop intervening in labour disputes. Shortly after, the Shidehara government clarified that they were seeking to curb "illegal acts associated with production control" rather than production control itself.

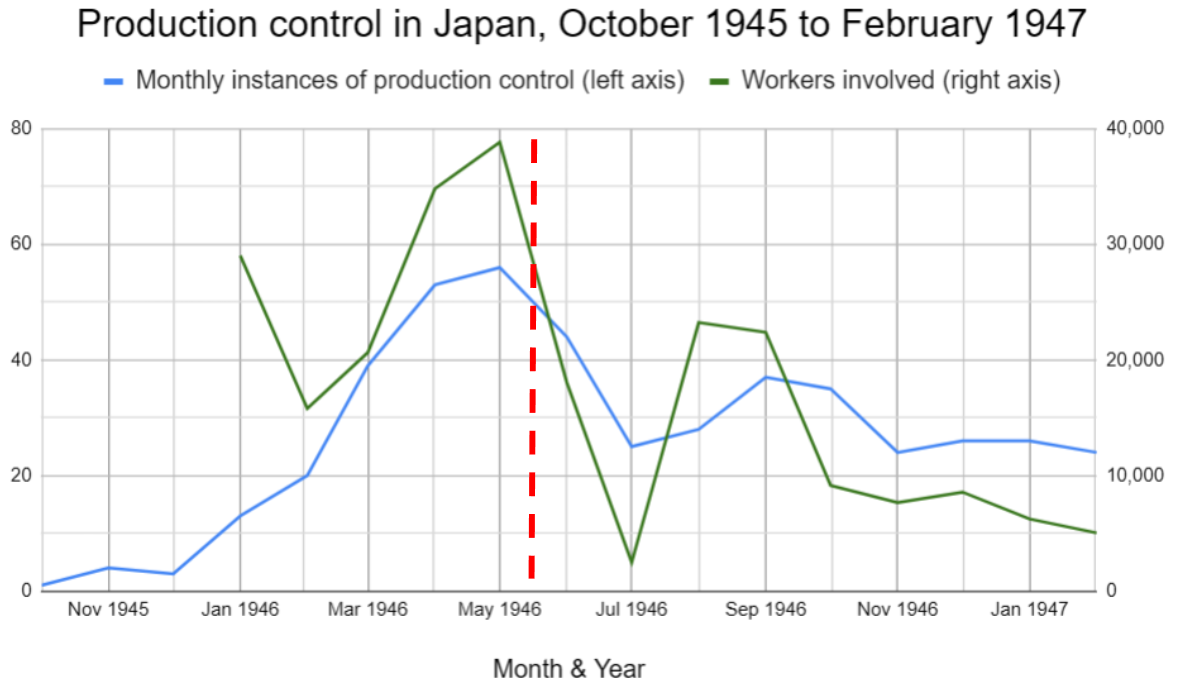
Graph showing instances of production control industrial disputes per month over time (adapted from Moore, 1985, p.11). The dashed red line represents the banning of the tactic by the Yoshida government in Jun 1946. Data not available for workers involved before Jan 1946.

=== Ban under Yoshida government ===
Upon his election, the conservative Prime Minister Yoshida issued a preliminary cabinet statement on 24 May 1946 condemning production control and calling for its elimination. This was followed on 13 June with a "Declaration on the Maintenance of Social Order" in which he denied government recognition of production control as a form of labour dispute. Supported by SCAP in this new declaration, the government started calling out the police to suppress workers in production control disputes. When SCAP released a statement that production control "violates the law of property rights", the legal position of production control was significantly weakened.

SCAP's support for the policy had changed since Shidehara's government attempted the same ban in February. Events taking place over Spring 1946 contributed to this shift, including an emboldened labour movement and Allied failures to adequately resolve food shortages. Emblematic of this period was the protest on 19 May 1946 "Food May Day" protest where over 100,000 protesters rallied in Tokyo. In response, SCAP took a harder line against the labour movement. Another part of the reason for the American policy shift between February and June was the growing tension between the USA and USSR in the nascent Cold War. The Soviet Union had defended production control in the Allied Council for Japan, and the United States broke its neutrality on labour issues to sharply criticise this stance and endorse Yoshida's government.

Despite initial protests, the large Sanbetsu union federation acceded to the ban. Their affiliated political party, the Japanese Communist Party had rejected the use of production control since February 1946, adopting a reformist platform of 'democratic revolution' and pursuing electoral success instead of a Soviet-style union-led revolution.

Despite the ban, between June 1946 and February 1947 an average of thirty cases of production control occurred each month.

The Japanese Supreme Court would eventually decide in the 1950 Yamada Steel case decision that production control was an unconstitutional tactic, as it contravened Article 29 of the Japanese Constitution protecting ownership rights over private property.

== Long-term impact ==
The legal scholar Suehiro Izutarō, who acted as a mediator in the initial Yomiuri dispute, generally endorsed equitable management councils to try and resolve labour disputes. After the failure of the Yoshihida government to ban production control in February 1946, the Japanese government adopted the strategy of promoting these councils as a compromise. One longer-term impact of this was that as late as 1948 around 44% of Japanese unions still had representation on an equitable management council. Rights gained by organised labour on these councils included vetoes on dismissal, hiring, and working conditions, and a general right to intervene in management decision-making.

From June onwards, the American occupation forces endorsed steps to eliminate production control. SCAP raised an objection to the progressive editorial content of the worker-controlled Yomiuri newspaper in June 1946, and pressured its publisher to demand resignations from six key ringleaders of the original production control dispute. When this order was refused, on 19 June the company hired dozens of 'toughs' to block the entrance to the business to these ringleaders. In response, the union formed an 'action squad' of 100 of its own members to physically force their way in. The same violence was repeated the next day.

Also in June, SCAP instructed the Japanese government to use police to crack down on labour disputes. As such, on 21 June, a detachment of armed police forced their way into the building and arrested four of the six union leaders. The Yomiuri workers threatened to reintroduce production control in retaliation. Finally, SCAP directly intervened, when the head of the Civil Information and Education Section of SCAP held a meeting with the newspaper's workers in support of management. As a result, the union was defeated, and Yomiuri returned to a conservative editorial line.

After Yoshida's government banned production control in June 1946, production control began to decline, although it remained relevant until 1947. When the head of SCAP, General MacArthur, suppressed the February 1947 general strike, the Japanese labour movement in general was significantly weakened. Early victories in production control disputes, including the establishment of equitable management councils, lasted until the Japanese government worked with SCAP backing to reduce the power of organised labour. This was seen for instance when the United States Army assisted Japanese police in enforcing a court injunction against the 1948 Toho strikes, including offering tanks and warplanes to help suppress the strike.

The suppression of the production control movement was one part of an American 'Reverse Course' in policy. SCAP refocused away from democratisation towards reconstruction and anti-communism, which played a significant role in weakening the Japanese labour movement in the long-term. Adversarial unionism and class struggle between labour and capital continued after into the 1960s, but this weakness eventually enabled the defeats of the 1960 Anpo protests and the Miike Struggle, which were severe setbacks for organised labour.

== Bibliography ==
- Burkett, Paul; Hart-Landsberg, Martin (2003). "Progressive capitalism, crisis, and class struggle: Lessons from Japan's production control and democracy movements, 1945-47". Capital & Class Struggle. 27 (1): 25–54.
- Dower, John W. (1988). Empire and Aftermath: Yoshida Shigeru and the Japanese Experience. Cambridge, Massachusetts: Harvard University Press.
- Moore, Joe (1983). Japanese Workers and the Struggle for Power, 1945-1947. Madison, Wisconsin: University of Wisconsin Press. ISBN 0-299-09320-4.
- Moore, Joe (1985). "Production control: Workers' control in early postwar Japan". Bulletin of Concerned Asian Scholars. 17 (4): 2–26. doi:10.1080/14672715.1985.10409905.
- Price, John (1997). Japan Works: Power and Paradox in Postwar Industrial Relations. Ithaca: ILR Press.
- Reubens, Beatrice G. (1946). ""Production control" in Japan". Far Eastern Survey. 15 (22): 344–347. JSTOR 3023397.
- Sakai, Yohichi (2009). "Japan, post-World War II protest movements". In Ness, I. (ed.). The International Encyclopedia of Revolution and Protest. John Wiley & Sons, Ltd. doi:10.1002/9781405198073.wbierp0816.
- Yanase, Noboru (2022). "Constitutional Cases of the Supreme Court of Japan: What the Court Stated and How We Can Obtain Each Text". Nihon University Comparative Law. 38: 55–132.
