= Toho strikes =

1946–48 labor strikes in Japan

- Part of Occupation of Japan
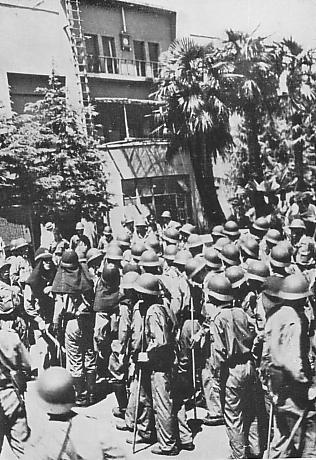
- Japanese police gathered outside Toho Studios during the third labor dispute
- Date: March 20, 1946 – August 19, 1948
- Location: Japan
- Methods: Strike, occupation
- Result: Strikes ended via police and military intervention: Resignation of union leaders; Mass dismissals of union members in 1950 and further dismissals during the Red Purge; Shintoho formed

Parties
Toho employees' union Supported by: Japan Motion Picture and Theatrical Worker's Union; Sanbetsu; Japanese Communist Party	Toho Supported by: Nikkeiren; August 19, 1948: Tokyo Metropolitan Police Department; United States Army

Lead figures
Takeo Ito; Yoshio Miyajima; Satsuo Yamamoto; Fumio Kamei; Akira Iwasaki; Shiro Amikura	

The Toho strikes (東宝争議, Tōhō sōgi), also translated as the Toho labor disputes or Toho labor upheaval, were a series of strike actions in Japan taken by workers in the Toho labor union against Toho management between 1946 and 1948. The third and largest action was notable for the union's months-long occupation of the Toho film studio, and their eventual removal by police backed by the United States Army.

The conflict between the union, backed by Sanbetsu, and management, backed by Nikkeiren (later the Japan Business Federation) became "the focus of a nation-wide confrontation between capital and labor," and the union's defeat marked the beginning of a fundamental shift of power from labor in Japan.

== Background ==
During World War II, Toho complied with government demands to produce militant propaganda films. Despite shortages of film stock and destruction of movie houses, production was never completely halted and the Toho film studio in Kinuta was too remote to be damaged by the bombing of Tokyo.

After the Japanese surrender, the Allied Occupation government enacted a campaign of liberalization in Japan, which included the return of freedom of expression, promotion of labor unions and democratization of the economy. A successful strike by the Shochiku employees' union chaired by screenwriter Kogo Noda encouraged the formation of unions at the other major film studios by the end of 1945. The employees' union at the Toho-Kinuta studio was founded on 5 December 1945 and expanded into the Toho employees' union on 17 Feb 1946. In December, the Japanese Diet passed the Trade Union Law, modelled on the American National Labor Relations Act of 1935. Following the American model, the studio unions organized into an umbrella craft union, the All-Japan Film Employee Union, later expanded and renamed to the Japan Motion Picture and Theatrical Worker's Union, or Nichi-ei-en (日映演), which joined the Congress of Industrial Unions.

== Strike actions ==
After the initial formation of unions in 1945, demands were met for salary increases to keep up with rampant inflation. The Toho union made further demands, including involvement in management and planning, which management found unacceptable. The union grew to 5,600 members including workers at main and branch offices, and called its first strike on March 20, 1946. After a 15-day strike, management agreed to a wage increase and the establishment of a production administration committee consisting of union members.

=== October 1946 strike ===
Nichi-ei-en planned a general strike within the film industry for October 15, 1946, issuing a series of demands including each company's recognition of Nichi-ei-en as their employees' collective bargaining agent. On October 6, a group of fifty workers broke away to form an alternative union, which would not take part in the strike. The first Toho union went on strike alongside the unions of Daiei and Shochiku and the rest of Nichi-ei-en, but by October 25, Nichi-ei-en had abandoned collective negotiation, and each union was left to negotiate individually with their company.

The strike at Toho continued into November; but on November 13 the "Society of the Flag of Ten" — actors Denjiro Okochi, Kazuo Hasegawa, Susumu Fujita, Setsuko Hara, Hideko Takamine, Isuzu Yamada, Takako Irie, Toshiko Yamane, Ranko Hanai, and Yataro Kurokawa — alienated by the militancy of the main Toho union and wanting to return to work, formed another union and were joined by around 450 studio employees, including directors Kunio Watanabe and Yutaka Abe. Takeo Itō, who was elected union chairman, later characterized the split as a conflict between eager, rising directors such as Akira Kurosawa, Hideo Sekigawa, and Satsuo Yamamoto, emboldened by the end of the war, and the established stars who disliked being forced to do things by the union such as parading in the streets, and wanted to produce entertaining films. The original union, reduced to nearly a third of its original size, reopened negotiations with management on November 18.

The contracts offered by both union and management were based on Occupation government samples from the American auto industry and their contents were similar, and the two sides came to terms, ending the strike on December 3. Among the terms were an eight-hour day, shop steward system and union involvement regarding administration, personnel affairs, and the production of films. Due to a closed shop provision with the first union, Toho negotiated separately with the second and third unions, which split off to establish Shintoho in March 1947.

For 1947 Toho management had planned to produce 24 films. However, production was controlled by a committee including union members, which approved only 13 films through 1947, compared to 18 films in 1946. Filmmakers were given unprecented creative control, as well as generous shooting schedules and generous budgets, two or three times higher than the average film budget of ¥5 million. While many of the films were critically acclaimed, Toho lost ¥75 million in 1947. Yoshio Osawa was removed as president by investors in March, and replaced by Tanabe Katamaru who fell ill in December after eighty-three all-night negotiations in his time as president. Tetsuzo Watanabe, a specialist in labor law, was appointed as president in December 1947. Under the leadership of Watanabe, who stated his aim of defeating "the two kinds of reds at Toho: communists and red budgets", Toho management announced a return to producing 24 films per year, with the budget of each film limited to ¥6.5 million. In addition, the union's contract would be revised to reverse the gains made by the second strike, including the abolition of the shop steward system. The union refused to co-operate.

=== Third Toho strike ===
In April Toho management announced the dismissal of 1200 employees, including 287 studio staff, with the publicized aim of both cutting expenses and eliminating Communist members of the union. Watanabe explained that Toho would bankrupt within half a year if these surplus workers were not fired. In response, the union issued a "manifesto of disobedience," and made calls for support throughout the country, attracting a "joint defense group" of around 3,000 sympathisers, including activists from the Japan Communist Party, Communist Youth League and Industry Labor Association, and North Korean Association, that helped to occupy the Kinuta studio on April 15, erecting barricades and closing the main gates.

On May 1 Toho announced a one-month suspension of studio operations, froze funds for all active productions, and demanded the closing and return of facilities to company control, which the union refused. Two to three hundred outsiders entered the studio every day, and were screened films. With the announcement coming on May Day, the unionists and their supporters sang songs, danced, held group discussions and marched around the lot. On May 8, Nichi-ei-en filed a protest against the closure of the studio before the Tokyo District Court, and Toho filed a counter-protest on May 11. On June 1, Toho suspended production indefinitely and stopped paying workers' salaries. Union members found jobs elsewhere, with directors Akira Kurosawa, Mikio Naruse and Senkichi Taniguchi forming touring theatre troupes to raise funds for the union. Actors including Ryo Ikebe, Yuriko Hamada, Takashi Shimura, and Ichiro Ryuzaki contributed their fees from acting in films of other studios.

In July a dissident group of 22 employees formed the Toho Democratization Club, later known as the Toho Employees Union, to oppose the Communist control of the union. Supported by the company, the group reportedly grew to around 100 members, and began wearing blue ribbons to distinguish themselves from the red ribbons of the main union. Both sides argued fiercely and rejected interventions by the Tokyo Municipal Labor Arbitration Committee, and on August 10, the members of the "Red Ribbon Club" used barricades, fire hoses and large fans in an attempt to block "Blue Ribbon Club" members from entering the studio to return to work.

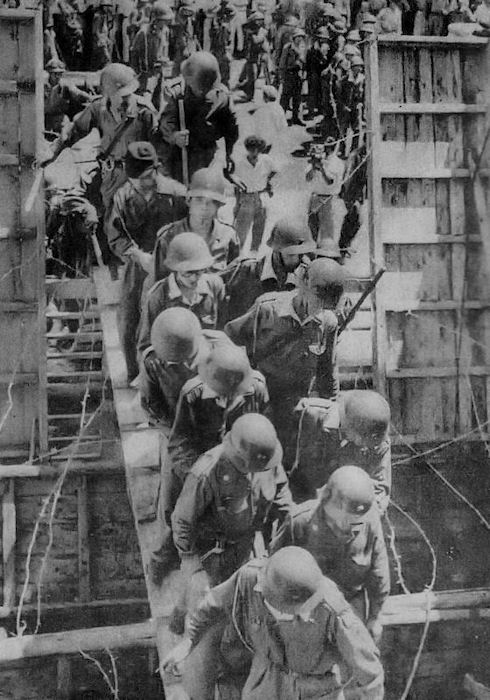
Police crossing the barricades after the end of the strike

On August 13 a group of union directors, screenwriters and producers issued a statement that they would resolve not to work for Toho unless Watanabe and his aide Mabuchi resigned, and it was decided that members would be sent to other studios and the Tokyo District Court to explain the situation at the studio. That same night, the court decided in Toho's favor, issuing an eviction decree, but the company's lawyers and court representatives were prevented from entering the studio the next morning by Nichi-ei-en members. On the morning of August 18, a Blue Ribbon member climbed the chimney of the film laboratory building and remained there for until the next morning when a fire started in the laboratory. While it is unclear who started the fire, according to an Occupation report, it was extinguished by union members who prevented firemen from dismantling the barricades for fear that police would follow.

At 9:30 on the morning of August 19 a district police chief arrived at the front gate to read out the court decision. Two thousand policemen surrounded the studio, reinforced by a platoon of soldiers of the 1st Cavalry Division, three scout planes, and six armored cars and five tanks sent by the U.S. Eighth Army. The New York Times reported that the American soldiers had arrived in response to a "call for a show of force" by Japanese authorities. However, the incident was initiated by the Eighth Army, which claimed Americans living in the vicinity were in danger and pressed for intervention by the Tokyo Military Government Team, which in turn instructed Toho to request police action. After 10:40, the union leaders agreed to end their occupation on the condition the union was not disbanded, and led a procession out of the rear gate, waving red flags and banners, and singing The Internationale.

In October Toho executives agreed with Nichi-ei-en to renounce its plans to dismiss 270 unionists in exchange the return of control over production and the voluntary resignation of 20 leading unionists, including director Satsuo Yamamoto, and Fumio Kamei and Akira Iwasaki, who were unionists but not employed by Toho. In addition, the union cancelled a planned nationwide strike against Toho theatres, and management acknowledged the union's right the organize and released funds for the completion of the production of Fumio Kamei's A Woman's Life.

== Aftermath ==
Resentment still remained towards Watanabe and Mabuchi, and between the employees at Toho and Shintoho, and many filmmakers, such as Akira Kurosawa, quit Toho entirely. When production restarted, all actors, technicians, directors, and writers had been organized into independent subcontracting groups.

Toho was severely weakened after the strikes, and produced only four films in 1948 and five films in 1949. Shintoho, now growing in its own right but still dependent on Toho distribution, demanded that Toho stop producing films. After Toho continued producing films, Shintoho announced it would not allow Toho to distribute its films. Toho sued, claiming ownership of the sixteen films in production at Shintoho. In March 1950, Shintoho agreed to give eight of the sixteen films to Toho and a year's distribution rights to 43 previous Shintoho movies. In exchange, Shintoho became independent from Toho.

In 1950, 1315 Toho employees were dismissed, the majority of them Nichi-ei-en members. Largely separated from the studio unions, Nichi-ei-en reorganized from an industrial federation into a loose association.

== Legacy ==
The military intervention against the Toho strikers presaged the Occupation's large-scale interventions against organized labor during the Red Purge, part of the wider shift in policy known as the Reverse Course, but such a show of force involving American military was never repeated. In addition, American involvement was not reported in Japanese newspapers.

During the peak of the Red Purge after the outbreak of the Korean War, over a hundred employees at Shochiku, Daiei and Toho were fired as communists and blacklisted. Many victims of the purge joined new independent production companies, including those formed by filmmakers who had resigned from Toho. The profits from A Woman's Life were used to fund the production of Street of Violence, directed by Satsuo Yamamoto, and the establishment of Shinsei Eigasha, which would serve as a precursor to an independent film movement in the 1950s. The modern Japanese film industry, consisting of production largely by independent companies and marketing by large corporations, can be considered a result of the Toho disputes.

After directing films for Shochiku, Shintoho and Daiei including the internationally acclaimed Rashomon, Akira Kurosawa returned to Toho in 1953, and went on to produce 11 more films at the studio. However, he considered the firing of young, promising assistant directors during the strikes the beginning of the decline of the Japanese film industry, ill-equipped to deal with the eventual rise of television.

== See also ==
- Those Who Make Tomorrow
- Hollywood Black Friday
