= Purge =

Forceful removal of people considered undesirable

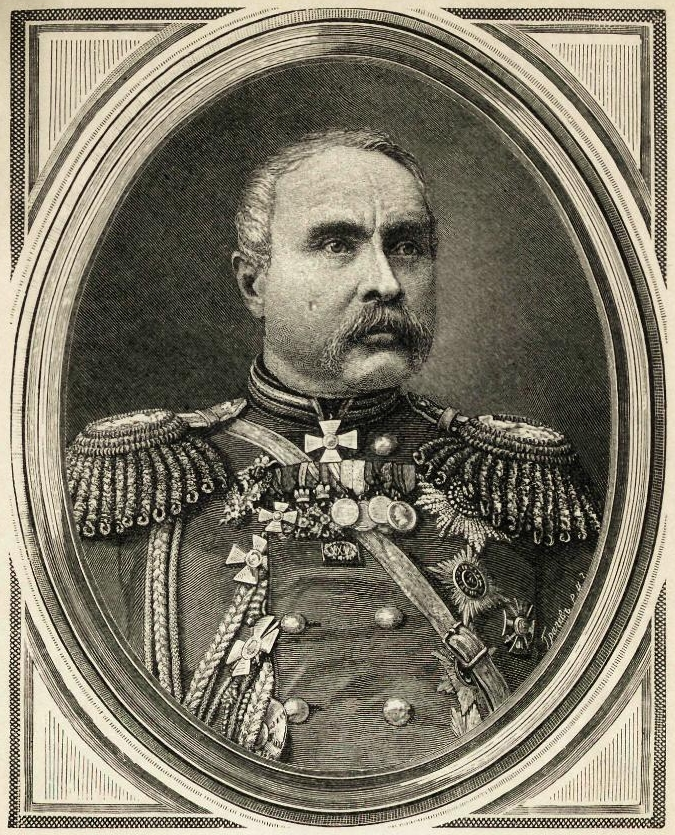
Russian Count Nikolay Yevdokimov, who organized the extermination campaigns of "Tsitsekun", designated Russian military operations targeting Circassian natives by the term ochishchenie ("cleansing").

In history, religion and political science, a purge is a position removal or execution of people who are considered undesirable by those in power from a government, another, their team leaders, or society as a whole. A group undertaking such an effort is labeled as purging itself.

Purges can be either nonviolent or violent, with the former often resolved by the simple removal of those who have been purged from office, and the latter often resolved by the imprisonment, exile, or murder of those who have been purged. Authoritarian regimes that enact purges often do so to consolidate power, punish disloyalty or create scapegoats. Governments who enact purges but want to obscure that they are doing so, may often justify their actions as dealing with security threats or corruption.

== Characteristics ==
The Shanghai massacre of 1927 in China and the Night of the Long Knives of 1934 in Nazi Germany, in which the leader of a political party turns against a particular section or group within the party and kills its members, are commonly called "purges". Mass expulsions of populations on the grounds of racism and xenophobia, such as the deportation of the Crimean Tatars in the Soviet Union, are not. Though sudden and violent purges are notable, most purges do not involve immediate execution or imprisonment, for example the periodic massive purges of the Communist Party of Czechoslovakia on grounds of apathy or dereliction, or the purge of Jews and political dissenters from the German Civil Service in 1933–1934.

Beginning in 1966, Chairman Mao Zedong and his associates purged much of the Chinese Communist Party's leadership, including the head of state, President Liu Shaoqi and the then-Secretary-General, Deng Xiaoping, as part of what the leaders termed the Cultural Revolution. In Maoist states, sentences usually involved hard labor in laogai camps and executions. Deng Xiaoping acquired a reputation for returning to power after he had been purged several times.

Purges are particularly likely when the power of competing elites is temporarily low, such as when a new dictator has taken office, or when a leader has just survived a coup. New dictators often target the military for a purge.

== Historical use of the term ==
=== English Civil War purge, 1648–1650 ===
The earliest use of the term dates back to the English Civil War's Pride's Purge. In 1648–1650, the moderate members of the English Long Parliament were purged by the New Model Army. The Parliament of England would suffer subsequent purges under Oliver Cromwell's Commonwealth of England, including the purge of the entire House of Lords. Counter-revolutionaries such as royalists and more radical revolutionaries such as the Levellers were purged. After the Stuart Restoration, obstinate republicans were purged while some fled to the New England Colonies in British America.

=== Soviet Union ===
Purges were frequent in the Soviet Union. In the Soviet Union, military and internal security elites were more likely to be detained than civilian elites.

The term "purge" is often associated with Stalinism. While leading the USSR, Joseph Stalin carried out repeated purges which resulted in tens of thousands of people sentenced to Gulag labor camps and the outright executions of rival communists, military officers, ethnic minorities, wreckers, and citizens accused of plotting against communism. Stalin together with Nikolai Yezhov initiated the most notorious of the CPSU purges, the Great Purge, during the mid to late 1930s.

=== Nazi Germany ===
In 1934, Chancellor Adolf Hitler ordered the execution of Ernst Röhm, other leaders of the Sturmabteilung militia, and political opponents.

=== France after WWII ===
After France's liberation by the Allies in 1944, the Provisional Government of the French Republic and particularly the French Resistance carried out purges of former collaborationists, the so-called "vichystes". The process became known in legal terms as épuration légale ("legal purging"). Similar processes in other countries and on other occasions included denazification in Allied-occupied Germany and decommunization in post-communist states.

=== Japan after WWII ===
The Red Purge was an anticommunist movement in occupied Japan from the late 1940s to the early 1950s. Carried out by the Japanese government and private corporations with the aid and encouragement of the Supreme Commander for the Allied Powers (SCAP), the Red Purge resulted in tens of thousands of alleged members, supporters, or sympathizers of left-wing groups, especially those said to be affiliated with the Japanese Communist Party, removed from their jobs in government, the private sector, universities, and schools. The Red Purge emerged from rising Cold War tensions and the Red Scare after World War II, and was a significant element within a broader "Reverse Course" in Occupation policies. The Red Purge reached a peak following the outbreak of the Korean War in 1950, when communist China supported North Korea. It began to ease after General Douglas MacArthur was replaced as commander of the Occupation by General Matthew Ridgway in 1951, and came to a conclusion with the end of the Occupation in 1952.

=== Communist Cuba ===
After the Cuban Revolution in 1959, Fidel Castro of Cuba often purged those who had previously been involved with the Batista regime. Purges usually involved the execution of the condemned. Castro periodically carried out purges in the Communist Party of Cuba thereafter. One prominent purge was carried out in 1989 when a high-ranking Cuban Revolutionary Armed Forces general named Arnaldo Ochoa was sentenced to death and executed by firing squad on charges of drug trafficking. Purges became less common in Cuba during the 1990s and 2000s.

=== United States: Red Scares, HUAC and McCarthyism ===
In the period 1938–1975, the House Un-American Activities Committee (HUAC), an investigative committee of the United States House of Representatives, carried out a campaign of purging alleged "communist sympathizers" from positions in public life. While non-violent, HUAC's campaign destroyed the careers of many individuals, particularly in the entertainment industry, where HUAC attempted to purge left-wing voices entirely from the industry through the Hollywood blacklist.

While not part of HUAC, U.S. Senator Joseph McCarthy was a major driver of efforts to purge real and perceived communist sympathizers through the 1940s and 1950s, which ended in his condemnation and censure in 1954.

== In the 21st century ==
=== China ===
Xi Jinping's anti-corruption campaign is widely considered to be a purge. A far-reaching campaign against corruption began in China following the conclusion of the 18th National Congress of the Chinese Communist Party in 2012. The campaign, carried out under the aegis of Xi Jinping, General Secretary of the Chinese Communist Party, was the largest organized purported anti-graft effort in the history of Communist rule in China.

In 2026, Xi Jinping was described as being engaged in a purge of the Chinese military, removing more than 100 senior leaders since 2022.

=== Iran ===
The Supreme Council of the Cultural Revolution of the Iranian government purged universities.

In August 2023, the government reportedly had a program to hire 15,000 replacements for people in universities and to place clerics in schools. It also removed Tehran University of Art’s major curricula for sculpting, music and cinematography/filmmaking. The government added Islamic studies even more so. Many academics were terminated/fired. On 14 December 2023 the Ministry of Education announced that it would hire 7000 clerics instead of teachers.

In 2025 that, after the Iran–Israel conflict, Iranian authorities arrested hundreds of people on security and espionage charges and increased executions, particularly in Kurdish regions. In 2026, Iran increased executions of dissidents and people accused of espionage.

=== Iraq ===
De-Ba'athification was undertaken by the Coalition Provisional Authority (CPA) and subsequent Iraqi governments to remove the Ba'ath Party's influence in the new Iraqi political system after the U.S.-led invasion in 2003. It was first outlined in CPA Order 1 which entered into force on 16 May 2003. The order declared that all public sector employees affiliated with the Ba'ath Party were to be removed from their positions and to be banned from any future employment in the public sector.

It is estimated that, before 2007, 50,000 civil government employees, as well as employees of other organizations listed in Annex A of Order No. 2, were removed from their positions as a result of de-Ba'athification. Another estimate places the number, also before 2007, at "100,000 civil servants, doctors, and teachers", who were forcibly removed from the public sector due to low-level affiliation.

=== North Korea ===
Members of the Kim family have each periodically purged their political rivals or perceived threats since consolidating their control over North Korea, beginning in the 1950s. The most senior Kim purged those who opposed his son's succession to the supreme leadership of North Korea. Kim Il Sung's most prominent purge occurred during the "August Incident" in 1956, when the pro-Soviet and pro-Chinese Yanan factions of the Workers' Party of Korea (WPK) attempted to depose Kim. Most of those involved in the plot were executed while some others fled to the USSR and China. While some purges were carried out under Kim Jong Il, they were not as common as they were under his father/son. Kim Jong Un purged several high-ranking officials and generals installed by his father Kim Jong Il in the former's first years in power, including, most prominently, his uncle Jang Song-thaek and his older half-brother Kim Jong-nam.

=== Turkey ===
After the failed 2016 Turkish coup d'état attempt, the Government of Turkey under Recep Tayyip Erdoğan began a purge against members of its civil service and the Turkish Armed Forces. The purge ostensibly focused mainly on public servants and soldiers alleged to be part of the Gülen movement, the group the government blamed for the coup. As part of the purge, about 200,000 public officials, including thousands of judges, were dismissed and detained. Politicized Kurds in Turkey have also been a major target of the Justice and Development Party-led purge.

=== Saudi Arabia ===
The 2017–2019 Saudi Arabian purge was the mass arrest of a number of prominent Saudi Arabian princes, government ministers, and business people in Saudi Arabia on 4 November 2017. It took place weeks after the creation of an anti-corruption committee led by Crown Prince Mohammed bin Salman.

The purge helped centralize political powers in the hands of bin Salman and undermine the pre-existing structure of consensus-based governance among Saudi elites. The arrests resulted in the final sidelining of the faction of King Abdullah, and Mohammed bin Salman's complete consolidation of control of all three branches of the security forces. It also cemented bin Salman's supremacy over business elites in Saudi Arabia and resulted in a mass seizure of assets by the bin Salman regime.

== Common targets ==
Goldring and Matthews show that dictators are more likely to purge first-generation elites, the very people who helped the dictator to seize power, since they are more powerful and connected. They also show that they tend to imprison purged first-generation elites rather than execute, exile or simply remove them.

== See also ==
- 1979 Ba'ath Party Purge
- Dirty War
- Extrajudicial killing
- Genocide
- Lustration
- Martial law under Ferdinand Marcos
- Political cleansing of population
- Political repression
- Proscription
- Reign of Terror
