= Red Purge =

Anticommunist movement in occupied Japan

- Part of the "Reverse Course" under the Occupation of Japan
- Location: Japan
- Date: 1948–1952
- Target: Communists and leftists
- Attack type: Mass firings; Dismissals from government posts; Bans on political activity
- Victim: 27,000+
- Perpetrators: Supreme Commander for the Allied Powers (SCAP); Government of Japan; Japanese corporations; Japanese universities
- Motive: Cold War tensions; Postwar Red Scare; Communist victory in the Chinese Civil War; Outbreak of the Korean War

The Red Purge (Japanese: レッドパージ, Hepburn: reddo pāji) was an anticommunist movement in occupied Japan from the late 1940s to the early 1950s. Carried out by the Japanese government and private corporations with the aid and encouragement of the Supreme Commander for the Allied Powers (SCAP), the Red Purge saw tens of thousands of alleged members, supporters, or sympathizers of left-wing groups, especially those said to be affiliated with the Japanese Communist Party, removed from their jobs in government, the private sector, universities, and schools.

The Red Purge emerged from rising Cold War tensions and the Red Scare after World War II, and was a significant element within a broader "Reverse Course" in Occupation policies. The Red Purge reached a peak following the outbreak of the Korean War in 1950, began to ease after General Douglas MacArthur was replaced as commander of the Occupation by General Matthew Ridgway in 1951, and came to a final conclusion with the end of the Occupation in 1952.

== Background ==
=== Surrender of Japan and early reforms ===
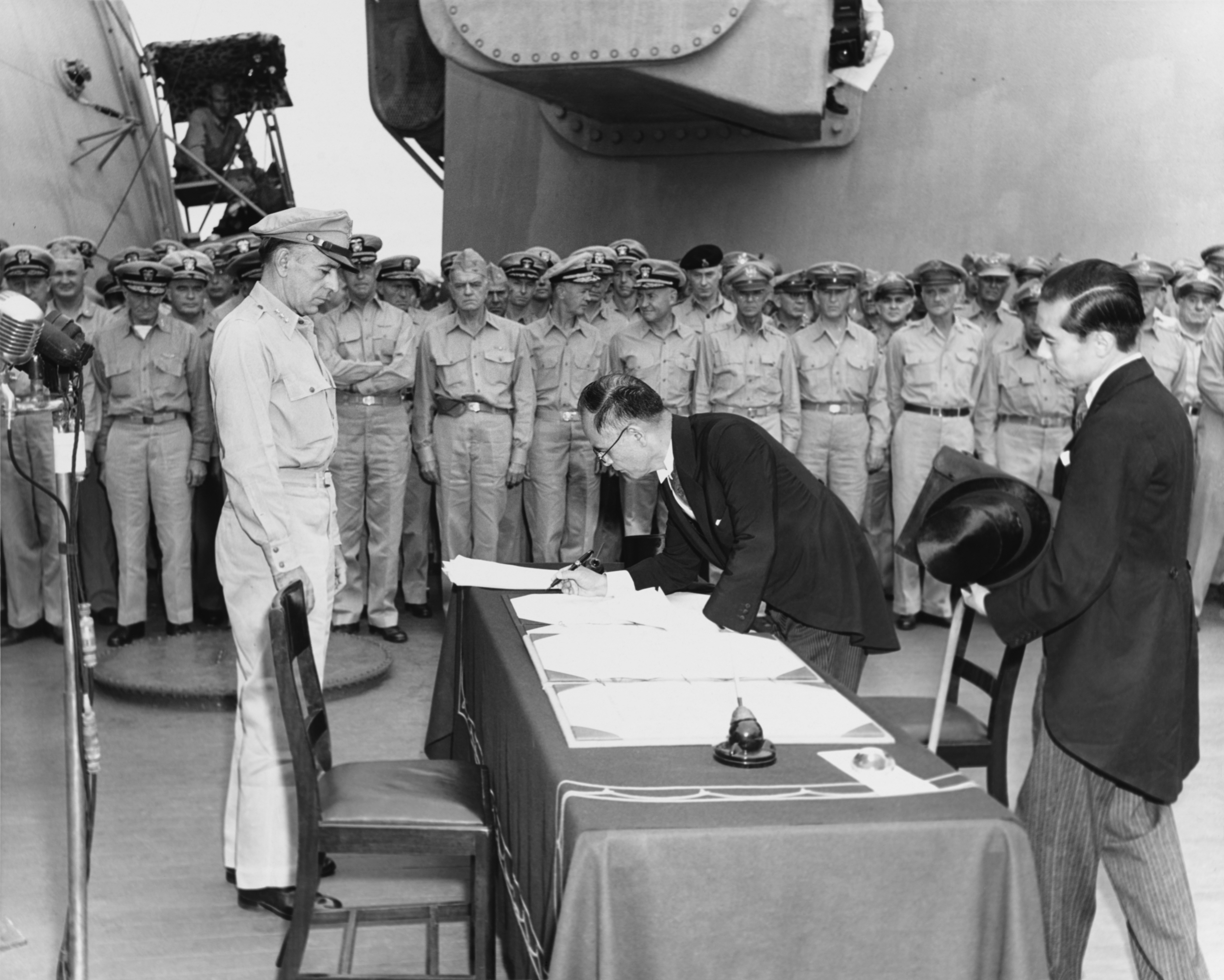
Japanese foreign affairs minister Mamoru Shigemitsu signs the Japanese Instrument of Surrender aboard the USS Missouri as General Richard K. Sutherland watches, September 2, 1945.

In August 1945, Imperial Japan surrendered to the Allied Powers. From September 1945 to April 1952, the United States occupied Japan and attempted to transform Japanese society from an authoritarian regime into a democracy. The Allies endeavored many ways to reform, including disarmament, dissolution of the Zaibatsu, granting of the freedom of speech, release of political prisoners, and enactment of the three labor laws to protect workers' rights: the trade union law, the labor standards law, and the labor relations adjustment law.

To manage Japan under the Allies, MacArthur constituted the Supreme Commander for the Allied Powers, a management organization of about 2,000 U.S. officers, also commonly known as General Headquarters (GHQ). Because MacArthur had a huge influence on the people of Japan, GHQ/SCAP was also often used to refer to MacArthur and his bureaucrats rather than just the organization itself.

==== Political reform ====
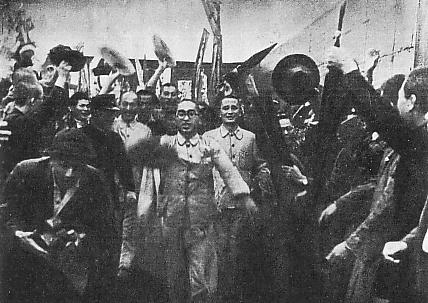
Release of Japanese Communist Party members from prison, 1945

On October 4, 1945, GHQ's Civil Information and Education Section composed the Civil Liberties Directive and ordered the Japanese government to abolish all laws and ordinances that restricted "freedom of thought, of religion, of assembly and of speech, including the unrestricted discussion of the Emperor, the Imperial Institution and the Imperial Japanese Government." Furthermore, SCAP commanded that all persons imprisoned under the designated laws must be released within a week, including many of these prisoners who were socialists or communists, and also specifically noted that the Japanese Communist Party (JCP) should be allowed become a legal political party again. Shortly afterward, many released communists and left-wing activists reorganized the JCP and held its first general assembly since 1926. Its membership grew rapidly, reaching 7,500 in 1946, 70,000 by 1947, and 150,000 in 1950.

Based on the Potsdam Declaration, Douglas MacArthur sent to the Japanese government a document "Removal and Exclusion of Undesirable Personnel from Public Office" on 4 January 1946, which commanded the purge of war criminals and leaders of ultranationalist groups. This purge, which lasted until May 1948, later came to be referred to as the "White Purge" in comparison to the "Red Purge", and led to more than 900,000 people undergoing investigation, with more than 200,000 former career military personnel, politicians, bureaucrats, educators, and opinion leaders ultimately being purged.

==== Educational reform ====
During the occupation period, the United States took many methods to reform Japanese educational system, which was heavily influenced by militarism, imperial ideologies and central government. These methods included expanded years of compulsory education, textbook reform, and issuance of the Fundamental Law of Education in 1947. Marxism, especially Marxian economics, was widely spread within many universities during this period. Many Marxists and leftist scholars, who had been banned from teaching, were encouraged by SCAP to organize social activities and regarded as victims of the previous regime and progressive and democratic by many students.

==== Economic reform and labor movement ====
Japan was seriously devastated in World War II. Nonetheless, with the help of the United States, Japan quickly recovered from the suffering, earning the title of "Japanese Economic Miracle". In Japan, industrial production decreased in 1946 to 27.6% of the pre-war level, but recovered in 1951 and reached 350% in 1960.

By the end of the American occupation of Japan in 1952, the United States successfully reintegrated Japan into the global economy to eliminate the motivation for imperial expansion and rebuilt the economic infrastructure that would later form the launching pad for the Japanese economic miracle.

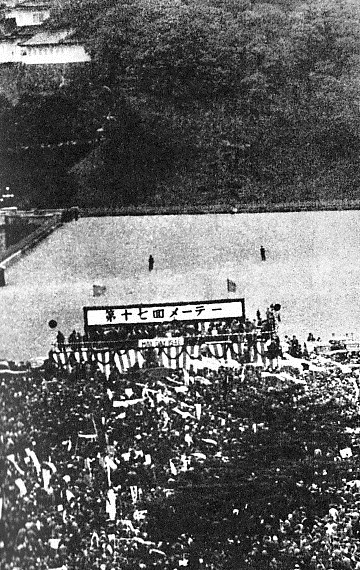
Labor Day demonstration, May 1st 1946

However, rapid economy growth also brought shortcomings and inequalities for poorer and weaker class in the society, especially the workers. The struggle between the working class and the capitalists in Japan became progressively more intense as the reconstruction work progressed. Initially aiming at gaining control over the workplace, seeking better security and respect for the working class, the struggle later evolved into a social movement. The workers not only formed trade unions and developed all kinds of trade unionism and socialism, but also united with the communists, the peasants and the poor city people in their struggle. In addition, Japan's rapid economic development brought serious inflation. From September 1945 to August 1948, prices in Japan increased more than 700%, which later led to crucial unrest in the society.

Under these reformations, activism and with the help of American authorities, nearly five million workers joined the labor movement by December 1946. At first, MacArthur was confident about labor movement because "working classes are the strongest single bulwark of the new democratic regime". The number of organized workers continued to grow, from 5 million in 1946 to 6.7 million by the end of 1948.

=== Cold War and the Reverse Course ===
After World War II, relations between the Soviet Union and the United States became increasingly strained in a series of conflicts and eventually led to the Cold War. In March 1947, shortly after the foreign ministers from the United States, Soviet Union, the United Kingdom, and France met in Moscow, President Truman issued the Truman Doctrine, which called for containing the global expansion of communism. Especially after the victory of the communists in the Chinese Civil War, the United States feared that a communist revolution might develop in Japan and sought to keep Japan stable and under control. In addition, the JCP and its leaders had been under the influence of the Comintern and the Chinese Communist Party (CCP) since the 1920s, and continued to attack the Emperor system and the government during the JCP's rapid growth in membership.

In the late 1940s, U.S. policies toward occupied Japan underwent a gradual transformation, shifting from focusing on demilitarization and democratization toward economic reconstruction and rearmament. In later years, this policy shift would come to be known as the "Reverse Course".

== Progression ==
=== Early conflicts ===
From 1946 onward, the labor movement in Japan began to gradually move beyond the vision of SCAP. Led by the JCP, left-wing socialists, and labor unions, Japanese workers launched a series of strikes. Some of these strikes continued to focus on the improvement of the working conditions and labor rights, but some were dedicated to impacting or even reconstructing the nation's political system. Instead of striking, some Japanese workers used the radical tactic of production control, where workers seized control of production at a company and managed its operations themselves to the exclusion of owners and management. In May 1946, Prime Minister Shigeru Yoshida blamed radical labor movements for their misuse of democracy, reiterating that both capitalists and workers cooperate for the same purpose of increasing production. SCAP retaliation also came very soon, starting with the Cabinet's Imperial Ordinance No. 311, which imposes fines and hard labor of up to 10 years for taking part in "acts prejudicial to Occupation objectives", followed by the usage of police enforcement. Nonetheless, strike action continued in various fronts, and some of the strikes went well, such as the September 1946 strike, which was conducted with MacArthur's acquiescence and achieved some success. The subsequent strike in October, however, was condemned by Yoshida, and the resulting conflict eventually made MacArthur change his position completely. In the same month, MacArthur and the Japanese emperor agreed on the point that the labor movement could be highly vulnerable to manipulation by political opponents.

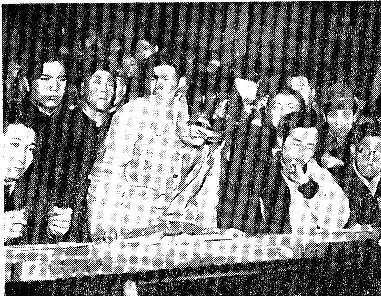
Yashiro Ii explains the background to the cancellation of the February 1 General Strike under preparation.

In solidarity with the All Japan Congress of Industrial Unions (Sanbetsu), left-wing and right-wing socialists united with communists and independents since November to prepare for a general strike on February 1, 1947. The general strike demanded both the solution of labor problems, food shortages, and inflation and the resignation of the Yoshida Cabinet. On January 18, the unions sent an ultimatum to the government demanding that the workers' demands be resolved by 31 January. MacArthur initially remained reluctant to ban the strike outright, merely issuing an informal warning to the unions and sending a document to the strike leaders stating he would not permit "a coordinated action by organized labor to provoke a national calamity by a general work stoppage." The unions ignored MacArthur's warning since they thought that SCAP would not violate its own newly issued labor rights law. On the afternoon of January 31, MacArthur issued a formal directive prohibiting the general strike that was in the process of being prepared. After the ban was issued, Theodore Cohen negotiated with the strike's leaders, and eventually, the strike leaders agreed to cancel the strike. Although the negotiations went well, leftists, especially members of the JCP, subsequently became hostile toward the Occupation authorities.

The Yoshida Cabinet intensified the situation, and instead of solving the inflation, they caused a further decline in the quality of life of the people, suppressed strikes, and confronted the unions, which caused a further spread of labor discontent and a further increase in union membership. In the 1947 general election, the socialists and liberals made significant gains, and the Yoshida Cabinet had no choice but to resign. Meanwhile, SCAP introduced a series of policies and laws to regulate the workers' movement and to provide compassion to the workers, but the policies and laws also called for preventing communists from manipulating the workers' movement to subvert the government. These policies and laws brought benefits to the workers and met many of the demands of the previously outlawed strikes, and also received a great deal of support from the JSP. However, the victory of the socialists and liberals did not mean that the conservative forces were weak; they still held many seats, while Tetsu Katayama's new coalition cabinet itself had internal conflicts between Marxists and others. The JCP was also not fully aligned with the new cabinet.

At the end of the labor reform in 1948, civil-service expert Blaine Hoover suggested in the new revision of the National Public Service Law that workers should not be allowed to overthrow the government by striking and collective actions. He was appointed to a newly created Civil Service Division inside Government Section although his proposal was stymied and not passed, including by GHQ and Prime Minister Katayama. Just as Hoover was revising the law once again in his new role, the Katayama Cabinet collapsed. Centrists in Katayama's cabinet could not continue to maintain their coalition, right-wing socialists lacked sufficient control over the labor movement to implement various austerity measures over the protests of the Sanbetsu and left-wing socialists, and the Democratic Party in the coalition strongly opposed Katayama's proposal for the state management of the coal industry, with conservatives among them ultimately chose to switch to Yoshida's liberals. Although the new Ashida Cabinet was governed by the same three-party coalition as its predecessor, MacArthur did not support the new cabinet as much as he had supported Katayama's. On 22 July 1948, shortly after the formation of the new cabinet, SCAP asked the Ashida Cabinet to pass an order banning strikes by 40% of workers in public industries throughout Japan. The Ashida Cabinet backed down and issued Cabinet Order No. 201 to implement the said actions. The order sparked oppositions and protests from a variety of workers, teachers, and civilians in Japan who considered it a violation of constitutional freedoms and basic labor law, and more than 100 people were arrested during the wave of opposition; the Soviet representative in the Allied Council for Japan and all non-U.S. members of the Far Eastern Commission in Washington also expressed opposition to the order. The order was finally carried out despite heavy opposition that led to the fall of the Ashida Cabinet, anti-American sentiment and the expansion of left-wing forces.

=== Conflicts in 1948 ===
With the introduction of the Truman Doctrine, the United States needed a stronghold in Asia against the expansion of communism, and with this goal in mind, Japan was the natural target of choice. Driven by the Reverse Course and American planners' projects, Japan and its economy were going to be connected with South Korea and the United States. In March 1948, the United States Department of State sent one of the planners, George F. Kennan, to Japan to conduct an investigation of SCAP's policy and the situation in Japan. Believing MacArthur was pursuing a very moderate policy, Kennan organized his own group and plotted to restrict MacArthur's actions. Under Kennan's efforts and Washington's pressure, GHQ began to turn gradually, and first they stopped the further disintegration of the Zaibatsu.

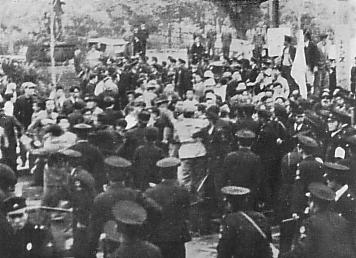
Clashes between police and protesters in Hanshin Education Incident

Kennan's policy and MacArthur's turn were naturally unpopular with many Japanese civilians, and a series of struggles and protests by Korean-Japanese, laborers, students, and teachers took place between the spring and summer of 1948. The Occupation authorities and the Eighth Army, with the support of Washington and a change in policy, suppressed these protests in a very aggressive manner.

With the suppression of left-wing movements by the Occupation authorities and the ongoing internal conflicts within the Ashida Cabinet, it finally collapsed in October 1948. Moreover, in September, a group of Ashida cabinet officials had already been arrested for receiving gratuities and hush money, and Ashida himself was also arrested in December. Under this situation, Yoshida formed a cabinet again on October 15 and remained in power until 1954. He was in power and his long administration allowed Kennan's policies and ideas to be further implemented in Japan. One of the most important of Kennan's policies was NSC-13/2, which included ending the liquidation of war criminals, listing 20 major opposition groups in Japan, and increasing the power of the government and police. After the enactment of NSC-13/2, government officials used the bill as a basis to demand that militant workers not strike, with one official telling them strikes were "unpatriotic". In late 1948, President Truman bypassed the Far Eastern Commission after the implementation of NSC-13/2 and introduced a directive emphasizing economic stability, and in response, Yoshida passed an austerity plan. In addition, GHQ announced that this plan had "a series of objectives designed to achieve fiscal, monetary, price and wage stability in Japan as rapidly as possible ... [this plan] will call for increased austerity in every phase of Japanese life". Austerity and the economic downturn also contributed to the spread of communism in the education sector; in September 1948, student associations throughout Japan formed Zengakuren, an organization that was heavily influenced by the communism then spreading on campus and later became a part of communist movement in Japan.

=== Conflicts in 1949 ===
==== Japanese Communist Party's electoral success ====
As Cold War intensified, JCP began to lean more and more towards anti-imperialism and nationalism, and the anti-imperialist tendency was greatly reinforced by the Cominform's critique of the party line on 6 January 1949, linking it to more revolutionary policies.

In the January 1949 general election, despite the almost complete decline of most left-wing parties in Japan, JCP scored a resounding victory, reaching 9.76% of the vote. After the election victory, JCP leader Sanzō Nosaka declared that JCP had no direct relations with either the Soviet Union or the Chinese Communist Party, and that JCP supported a peaceful revolution. Nonetheless, McCarthyism spread from the United States and the anti-leftist policies of the Yoshida cabinet still turned on JCP.

==== Dodge Line ====
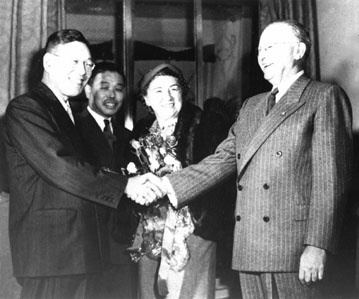
Joseph Dodge (right) meets Hayato Ikeda, 1948.

In February 1949, Joseph Dodge arrived in Japan, and a set of austerity policies ensued: cutting public spending, limiting public consumption, and reorienting industrial production in favor of export-oriented. These policies, known as "Dodge Line", not only tightened and bolstered Japanese economy and created a link between big business owners and Japan's conservative parties; but also caused a sharp drop in productivity and massive job losses for workers and government employees, which is also referred to as "Dodge squeeze". In June, influenced by the Dodge Line, the Yoshida Cabinet decided to revise the Labor Union Law and the Labor Relations Adjustment Law to reshape labor-management relations in Japan; both were simultaneously used to suppress left-wing radicals and strengthen control over labor unions. Specifically, the revised laws prohibited workers from being paid during strikes, increased the employer's advantage in collective bargaining, required a minimum of 30-day cooling-off period between strikes, and provided that unions emphasizing on social or political movements would not be recognized by the government.

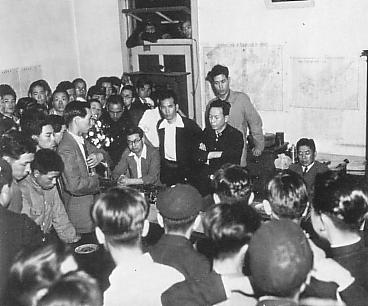
Crowd breaking into the police station in Taira

Japanese workers strongly opposed the austerity policies of Dodge and Yoshida and had been continuously opposing them through strikes, wildcat strikes, and protests since March 1949. In April, at the instigation of MacArthur, Yoshida issued the Ordinance for Controlling Associations and Others to "facilitate [the] healthy development of pacifism and democracy", to prohibit "militaristic, ultra-nationalistic, violent, and antidemocratic" groups, and to require each political organization to register its name, membership, purpose and activities. JCP registered over 100,000 members, which later helped the government locate communists. In June, communist leaders announced that a "September Revolution" would be launched. In the same month, Taira and some other cities were occupied by 500 workers.

Critics focused on similarities between Taft–Hartley Act and the revisions, while Eiji Takemae noted that "the revision ... was not a carbon copy of the ... US law. Its architects ... were social bureaucrats committed to reintegrating labor into a Japanese system..." Ruriko Kumano asserted "Dodge's mission was to bolster Japanese economy so as to prevent Japan from falling to communism."

==== Three unsolved railroad incidents ====
In April, Yoshida wrote to SCAP that he intended to lay off more than 100,000 railroad workers in order to comply with the austerity program. Shortly thereafter, Yoshida began the formal layoffs, while these layoffs were firmly opposed by workers and railroad industry unions, and numerous work stoppages, strikes, and occupations occurred. JCP also took a stand in support of the workers.

Three unsolved incidents occurred during clashes between railroad workers and the government. On July 5, Sadanori Shimoyama, the chairman of Japanese National Railways who had received threatening letters, disappeared mysteriously and was later found dead on the tracks next to Kitasenju Station, became the subject of debate as to whether his death was a suicide or a homicide, and there were even rumors that the incident was the result of operations by U.S. and Soviet agents. Ten days later, shortly after the announcements of the second round dismissals were posted, an unmanned 63 series train in Tokyo that had been parked overnight was suddenly released, and capsized after hitting and breaking a buffer stop, killing six people and injuring 20. Police then believed that the leftists had caused the incident, arresting nine communists and a former National Railroad driver, but ultimately did not reach any satisfactory conclusions. On August 17, a train carrying 630 people derailed, killed three crew members on board, and police subsequently arrested 20 people, most of them communists.

==== Purges ====
With SCAP's support and advance premeditation, left-wing politician Jiichirō Matsumoto became the first to be purged from the Yoshida cabinet after the vote. In April, Yoshida pledged that he would use extra-parliamentary means to combat the left. In June, employers began re-signing labor contracts and firing workers with communist ideological tendencies. In July, along with the investigation of communists in the government, Yoshida began dismissing them. The same month, MacArthur suggested an official ban on JCP.

In July, the Civil Information and Education Division (CIE) under SCAP sent Dr. Walter C. Eells of Stanford University on a six-month round of lectures to denounce the left and to target JCP-controlled Zengakuren in particular. He declared at Niigata University on July 19 that "communism is a dangerous and destructive doctrine ..." and Japanese universities need to dismiss communist professors as soon as possible, which later became a nationwide sentiment and widely quoted by Japanese newspapers. Despite the fact that his lectures were not popular within the universities, Japanese Education Minister Takase Sōtarō secretly began firing pro-Communist teachers under the advice of SCAP. By March 1950, some 1,100 people had been dismissed. SCAP also recommended the government to "decommunize" the civil service without establishing a formal institution.

Most studies of Allied history in East Asia agree that Eells' actions were the first suppression of academic freedom in post-war Japan. However, Hans Martin Kramer in his 2005 study argues that CIE was not directly involved in the purges and that it is doubtful whether Eells himself could be positioned as an instigator. Kramer quotes a CIE memo to demonstrate CIE's limited involvement:

How does one get a clear understanding of the conditions under which the purge is to be administered? The newspaper is a poor source of information on matters of this kind ... What assurance, if any, do we have that the purge will not repeat the mistakes of ten years ago when liberal and progressive professors were liquidated?

Despite that, Kumano states that even if CIE is not directly involved in this matter, their "recommendations" still plays a crucial role to take such actions.

Five days after Eells' speech, the Japanese government announced that teachers and professors would be allowed to participate in political groups, "activities of university professors, such as expressing their opinions ... are thought to be an integral part ... as professors", while the education department and universities used various irrelevant reasons to force them to resign. The U.S. State Department Office of Intelligence Research reported that 20 - 30 professors were urged to resign during late-September. In the same month as Eells' speech, the National Railroad fired 126,000 workers, and in a report three months later, the head of Administrative Management Agency said the firings were based on the law and not on a purge of communists.

At the time, Japanese academics considered the government's persecution of communists to be criminal, and recalling the government's suppression of left-wing ideas before WWII, they believed that academics should remain neutral and that sympathy for communism should not be a reason for dismissal.

=== Conflicts in 1950 ===
==== Shift of the Japanese Communist Party and clashes ====
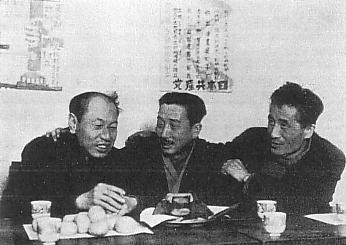
JCP leaders Kyuichi Tokuda, Sanzō Nosaka and Yoshio Shiga (from left to right) immediately following the end of the Second World War. All of them get purged and later go underground.

In December 1949, Soviet representatives in Japan summoned several JCP leaders, including Sanzō Nosaka, who had previously advocated peaceful revolution, to question the success of their peaceful revolutionary strategy and to present a plan for a nationwide revolution in Japan. On January 6, 1950, Cominform published an editorial entitled "Concerning the Situation in Japan" in For a Lasting Peace, for a People's Democracy!, criticizing JCP's peaceful revolutionary strategy. On January 12, Kyuichi Tokuda, chairman of JCP, published an article entitled "Statements on 'Concerning the Situation in Japan'" (“日本の情勢について”に関する所感, "Nihon no jōsei ni tsuite" ni kansuru shokan) to refute the editorial of Cominform, JCP later split into two factions: the "Statement Faction" (所感派, Shokan-ha), which supported Tokuda's path, and the "International Faction" (国際派, Kokusai-ha), which supported Cominform. On January 17, the People's Daily also criticized Nosaka's strategy with the title "The road to liberation of Japanese people" (Chinese: 日本人民解放的道路), arguing that the JCP should change its previous strategy.

On January 25, Nosaka publicly declared in the preparatory session of the House of Representatives that 1950 would be the year that determine Japan's fate, emphasizing the need for a massive movement to reach peace treaties with all belligerent countries. In February, Nosaka made a self-criticism in the party's official newspaper Shimbun Akahata (Akahata), and JCP had since shifted to a more radical and combative strategy.

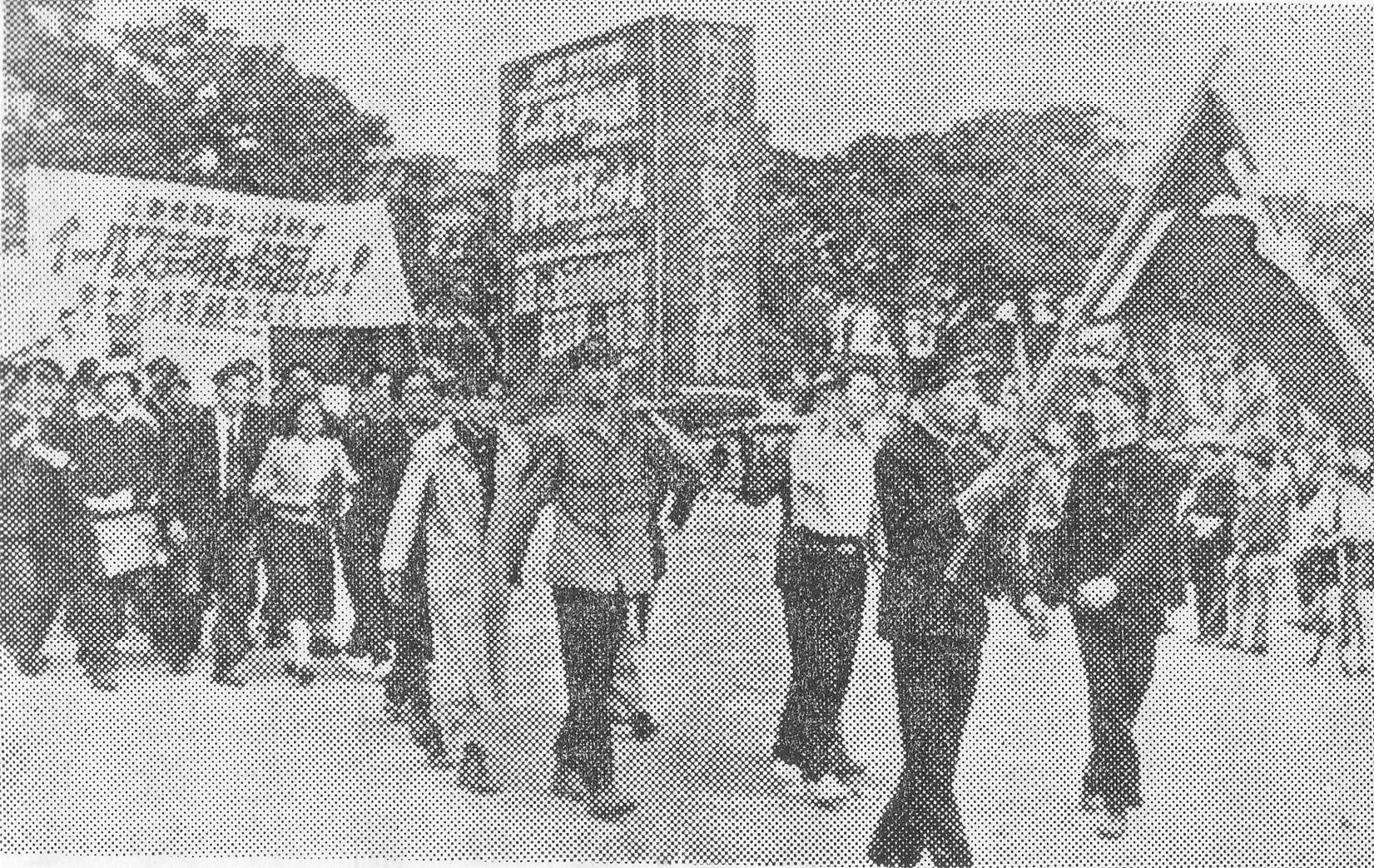
Students of Zengakuren protest against Eells' speech, 1950.

The shift inside the JCP made both SCAP and the Japanese government very cautious and led them to believe that the JCP was being manipulated by the Soviet Union and China. At the end of January, the Ministry of Education officially announced that red professors should be excluded from the education system. On March 6, Yoshida sent a letter to MacArthur suggesting the formal dissolution of JCP. MacArthur replied that he did not have such authority, but he would not oppose the resolution if it was passed by the Diet. In April, Eells was accused by students from Zengakuren during a lecture at Kyushu University of trying to turn Japan into a U.S. colony, and the students demanded that the censorship of the professors be stopped. Immediately thereafter, major industrial and business CEOs announced that they would not hire communist sympathizers and communist students. On May 30, JCP-related groups protested and chanted anti-American slogans in front of the Tokyo Imperial Palace, and during the same period, Akahata published a series of articles criticizing the policies of the Occupation authorities. On June 6, MacArthur ordered Yoshida to formally purge 24 influential members of JCP's Central Committee and forbid them from conducting all political activities or publishing any articles in journals. The next day, the order was extended to the entire Akahata editorial board.

==== Outbreak of the Korean War ====
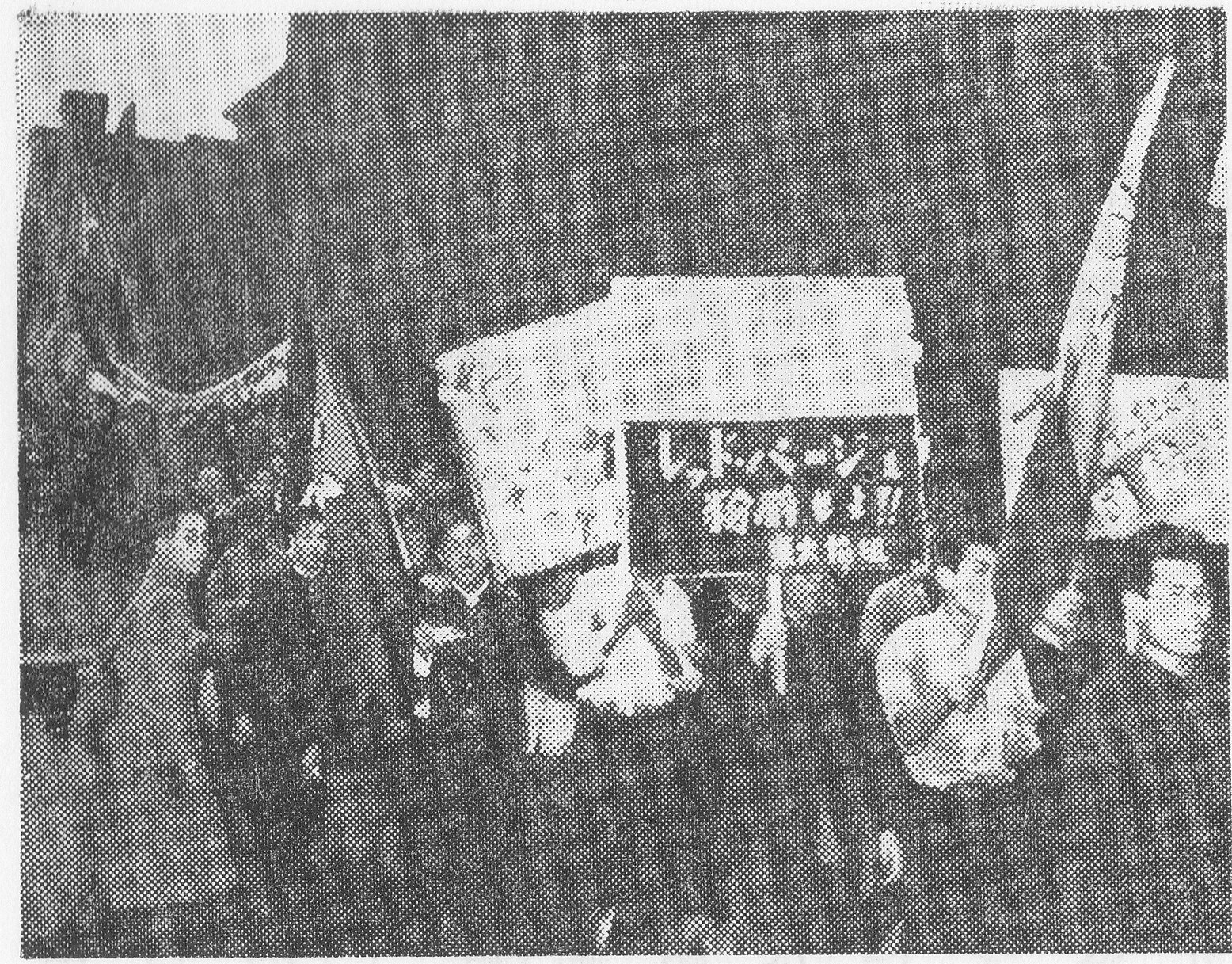
Students of the University of Tokyo march in the streets to protest against the Red Purge, October 1950.

On June 25, the Korean People's Army crossed the 38th Parallel behind artillery fire. The outbreak of the Korean War caused Japan's economy to take off rapidly, leading to Japan's strategic position becoming important. The next day, MacArthur demanded Japanese government to suspend Akahata for thirty days. At the same time, Japanese police were deployed throughout Japan to search JCP cells. A large number of universities openly began firing communist or communist-leaning staffs. An August 1950 Attorney General's Office report pointed out that 10 of the approximately 180 communist-leaning professors had been dismissed, and another 18 were still under investigation. On July 18, Yoshida began to start a campaign to prevent communists from using the media to spread destructive messages. On the same day, Akahata was shut down indefinitely. Ten days later, the purge spread to seven other major national newspapers as well as NHK. According to documents from the Ministry of Labor, NHK fired 119 people, Asahi Shimbun fired 104 people, and Mainichi Shimbun fired 98 people. The purge was extended to private companies since August, which ultimately led to thousands of dismissals for their political beliefs, making a total of around 11,000 workers in public sectors and 11,000 workers in private companies in 1950.

In July, nine communists, including Nosaka and Tokuda, were issued arrest warrants for violating the Ordinance for Controlling Associations and Others. Many Japanese communists, including Tokuda, went underground and tried to organize guerrilla forces against the Japanese government, though the party itself was never banned. In August, Cominform even asked JCP to launch a national uprising.

=== End of the Red Purge ===
In November 1950, the Ministry of Labor stated that it would not tolerate the continuation of the Red Purge. In May 1951, general Matthew Ridgway, MacArthur's successor, allowed the Japanese government to ease the purge. The signing of the Treaty of San Francisco on April 28, 1952, marked the restoration of sovereignty to Japan and the end of a series of official purges, including the Red Purge.

== Legacy and aftermath ==
JCP's mainstream faction organized Mountain Village Operation Units (山村工作隊, Sanson Kōsakutai) and Nucleus Self Defense Units (中核自衛隊, Chukaku Jieitai) to support terrorist attacks. The JCP's membership also declined sharply, from 150,000 in 1949 to about 20,000 in 1955. The violent tactics adopted by the JCP were not abandoned until 1955.

The Supreme Court's judgement in the Chugai case on April 18, 1960, after the restoration of sovereignty, ruled that the Red Purge of key industries was an "extra-constitutional measure at the direction of GHQ, and therefore that dismissals could not be contested", ruling in favour of the defendants and setting a precedent for subsequent cases. In 2011, three people who were dismissed in the Red Purge lost their lawsuit for compensation.

On May 1, 2013, an editorial in the JCP's Akahata stated that the Red Purge was a gross violation of human rights, a trampling of freedom of thought and conscience, and a violation of Article 19 of the Constitution of Japan.

== See also ==
- Bloody May Day
- Relations between Japanese revolutionaries, the Comintern and the Soviet Union
- McCarthyism
