= Jinsei Annai =

Title roughly translates as "A guide for life"

Jinsei Annai (人生案内, Jinsei Annai) is the name of a Japanese advice column featured in the Yomiuri Shimbun. The title roughly translates as "A guide for life". It is also translated and run in The Japan News, the English language edition of the Yomiuri, as Troubleshooter.

== Origins ==
It was originally inspired by a similar column in the French newspaper Le Figaro, and featured in the "Fujin Furoku" (Women's supplement) page of the paper. The column was called "Mi No Ue Sodan", or "Personal Discussions." In 1942 amid war shortages the column was discontinued. It was restarted in 1949.

== Representative mentors ==
- Junko Umihara
- Masami Oh'hinata
- Kazuki Ōmori
- Keiko Ochiai
- Youko Saisyoh
- Machiko Satonaka
- Kiyoshi Shigematsu
- Jakucho Setouchi
- Hidenemi Takahashi
- Wahei Tatematsu
- Tatsurou Dekune
- Sachiyo Toi
- Shouichirou Nomura
- Megumi Hisada
- Masahiko Fujiwara
- Akemi Masuda
- Taku Mayumura
