= All Japan Dockworkers' Union =

Trade union in Japan

The All Japan Dockworkers' Union (JDU; Japanese: 全日本港湾労働組合, Zenkowan) is a trade union representing port workers in Japan.

The union was established in 1946, and was affiliated with Sanbetsu. However, in 1950 it switched to the new General Council of Trade Unions of Japan (Sohyo). Its membership reached 28,214 by 1970, then fell to 22,124 in 1985. In 1989, Sohyo merged with the Japanese Trade Union Confederation, but Zenkowan instead opted to become independent.
