= The Yomiuri Shimbun =

Japanese newspaper

- Front page of the Yomiuri Shimbun from July 17, 2006, following the adoption of UN Security Council Resolution 1695 two days prior
- Type: Daily newspaper
- Format: Blanket (54.6 by 40.65 centimeters (21.50 in × 16.00 in))
- Owner: The Yomiuri Shimbun Holdings
- Founded: November 2, 1874; 152 years ago
- Political alignment: Centre-right to right-wing Conservatism (Japanese); Moderate conservatism
- Language: Japanese
- Headquarters: Otemachi, Chiyoda, Tokyo, Japan
- Country: Japan
- Circulation: ▼5,332,539 (July–December 2025)
- Website: www.yomiuri.co.jp

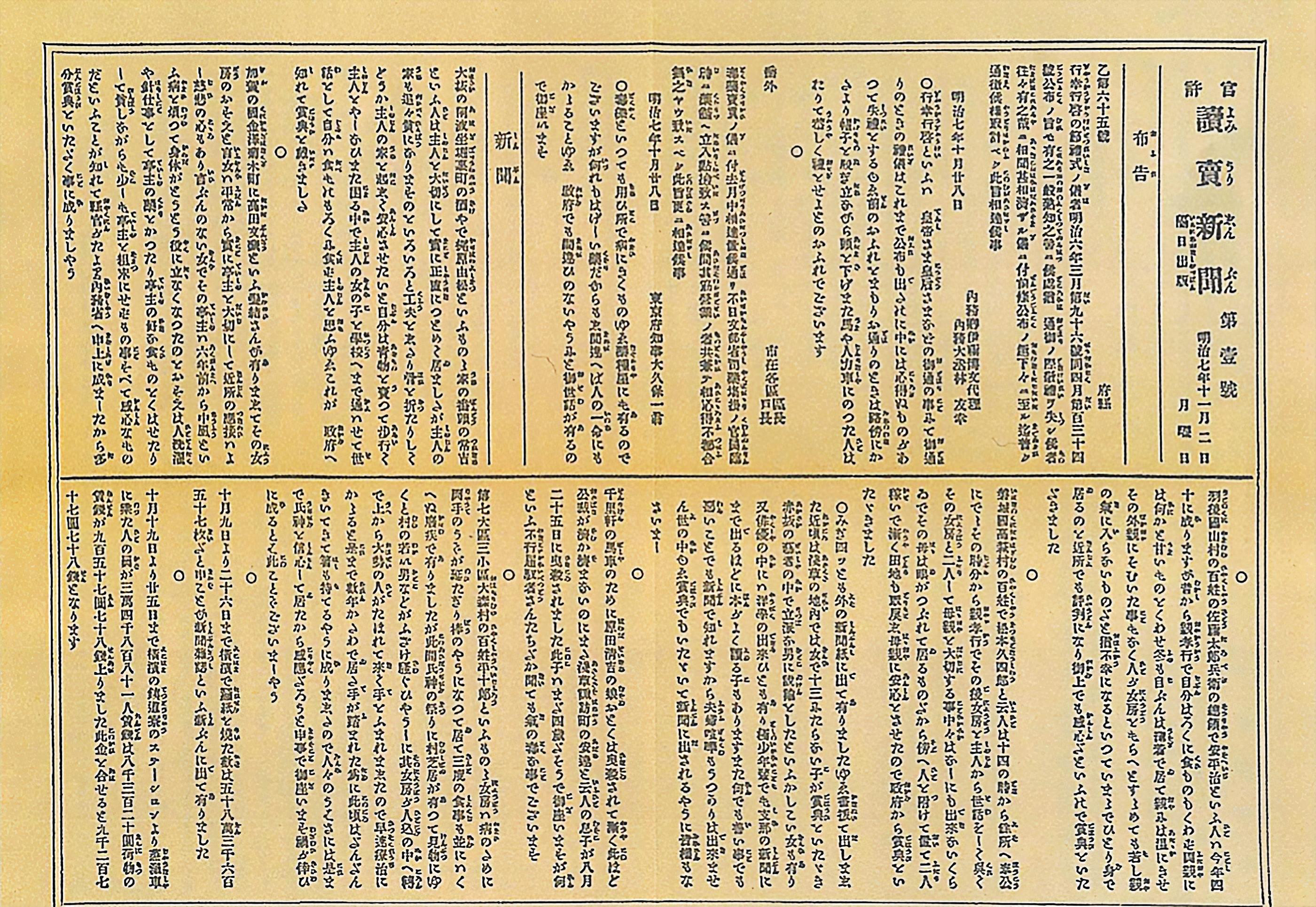
First issue of Yomiuri Shimbun on November 2, 1874

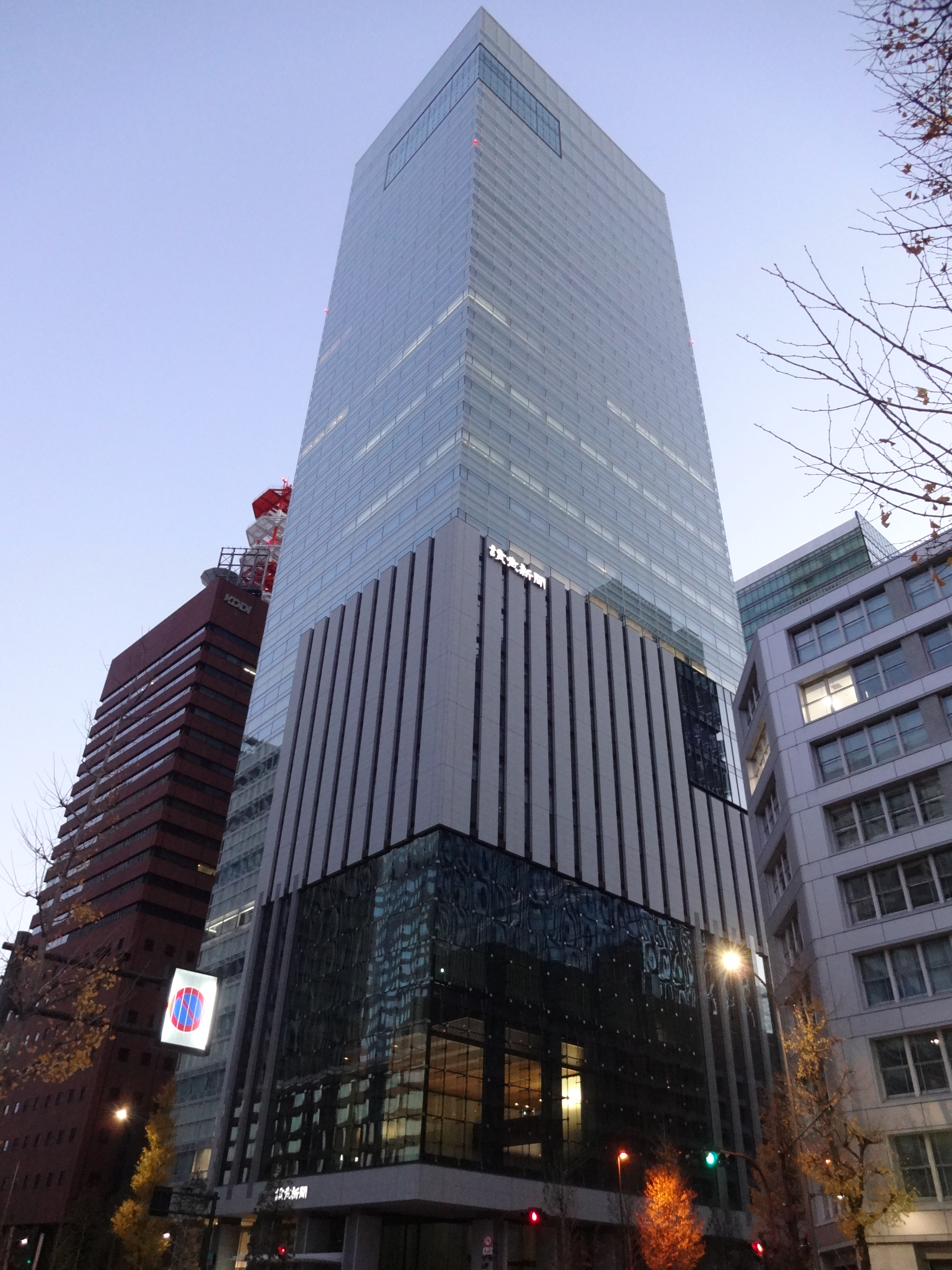
Current headquarters of the Yomiuri Shimbun in Tokyo (読売新聞東京本社)

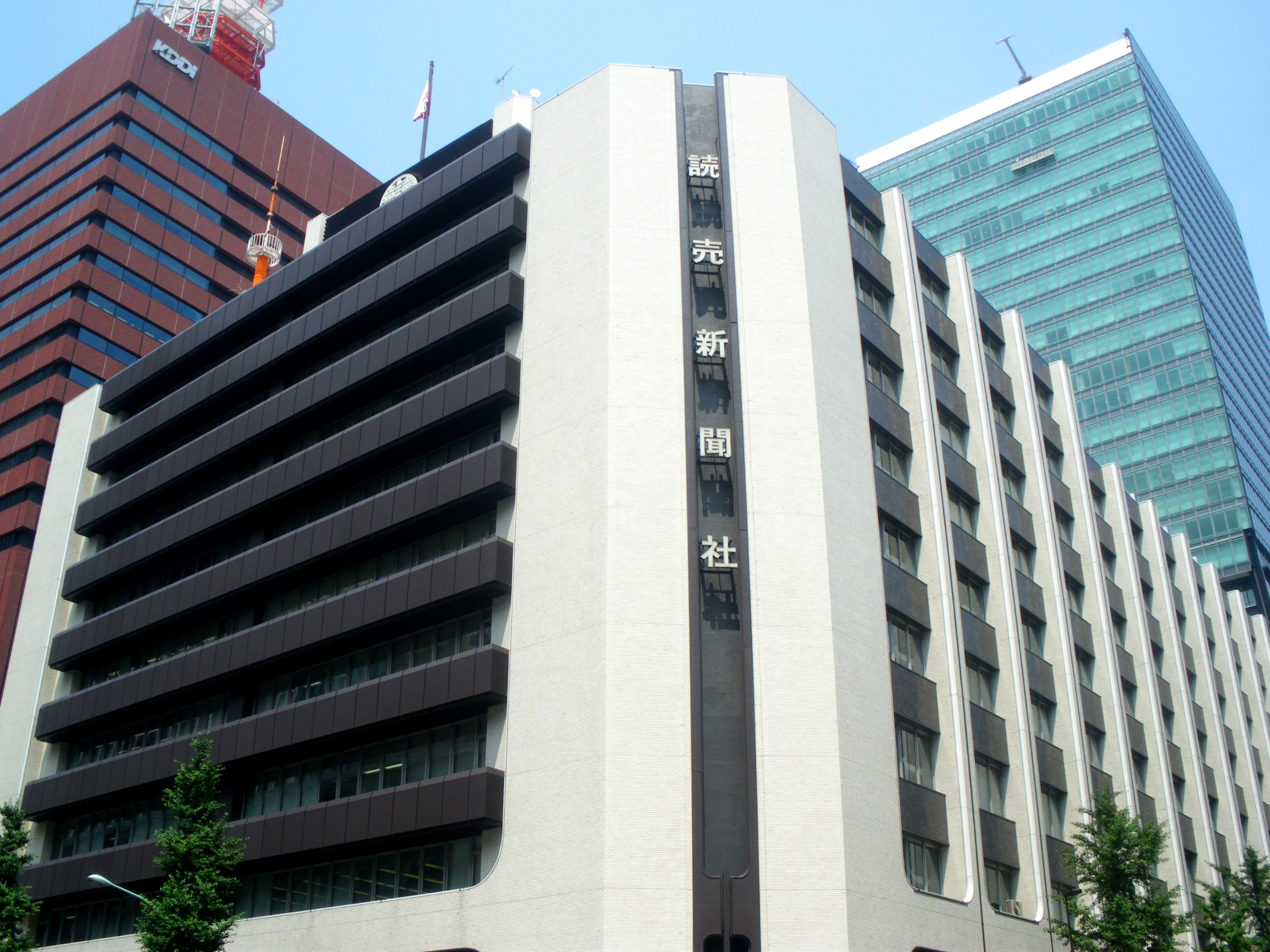
Former headquarters of the Yomiuri Shimbun in Tokyo, now demolished

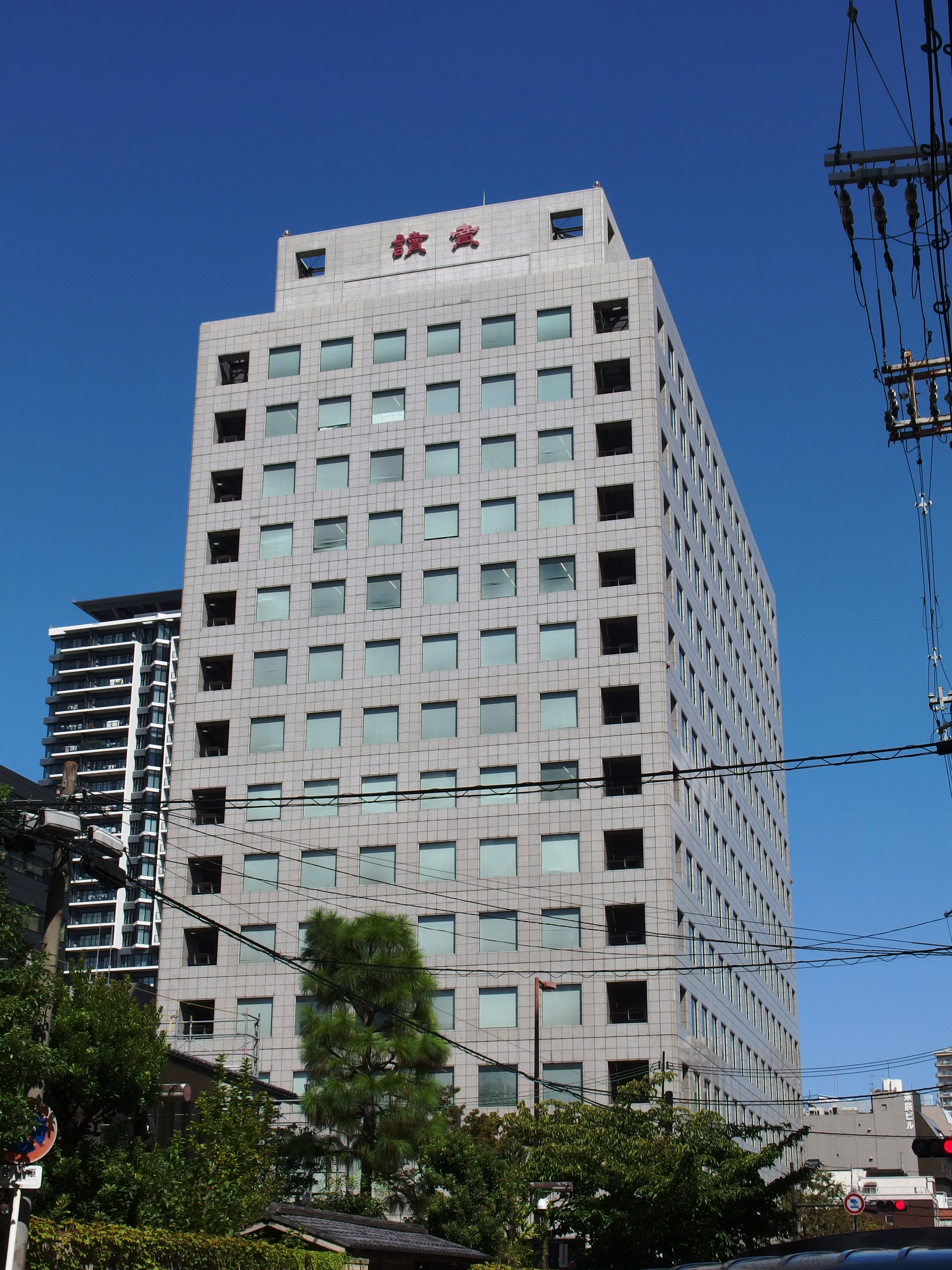
The Yomiuri Shimbun's Osaka office

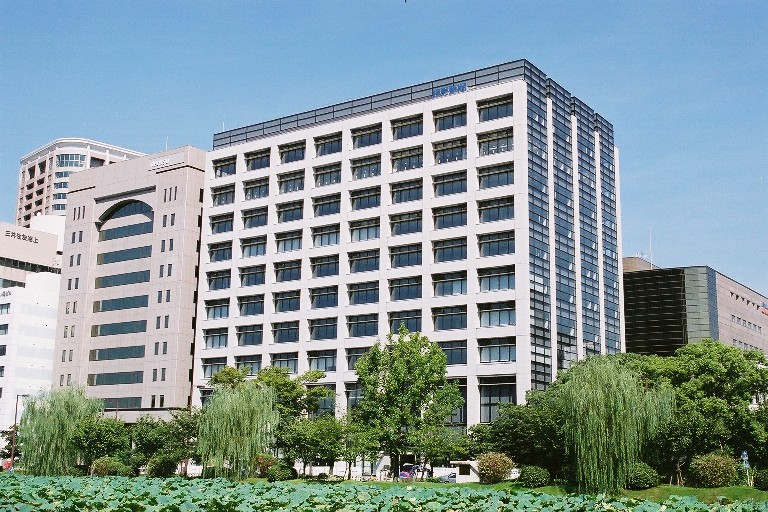
The Yomiuri Shimbun's Fukuoka office

The Yomiuri Shimbun (読売新聞) (Note: This is the name written in shinjitai. In kyūjitai, it is written as 讀賣新聞.) is a Japanese newspaper published in Tokyo, Osaka, Fukuoka, and other major Japanese cities. It is one of the five major newspapers in Japan; the other four are The Asahi Shimbun, the Chunichi Shimbun, the Mainichi Shimbun, and the Nihon Keizai Shimbun. It is headquartered in Otemachi, Chiyoda, Tokyo.

It is a newspaper that represents Tokyo and generally has a conservative orientation. It is one of Japan's leading newspapers, along with the Osaka-based liberal (Third Way) Asahi Shimbun and the Nagoya-based social democratic Chunichi Shimbun. This newspaper is well known for its pro-American stance among major Japanese media.

It is published by regional bureaus, all of them subsidiaries of The Yomiuri Shimbun Holdings, Japan's largest media conglomerate by revenue and the second largest media conglomerate by size behind Sony, which is privately held by law and wholly owned by present and former employees and members of the Matsutarō Shōriki family. The Holdings has been part-owned by the family since Matsutarō Shōriki's purchase of the newspaper in 1924 (currently owning a total of 45.26% stock); despite its control, the family is not involved in its executive operations.

Founded in 1874, the Yomiuri Shimbun is credited with having the largest newspaper circulation in the world as of 2019, having a morning circulation of 5.7 million as of December 2024. The paper is printed twice a day and in several different local editions.

The Yomiuri Shimbun established the Yomiuri Prize in 1949. Its winners have included Yukio Mishima and Haruki Murakami.

== History ==
The Yomiuri was launched in 1874 by the Nisshusha newspaper company as a small daily newspaper. Throughout the 1880s and 1890s the paper came to be known as a literary arts publication with its regular inclusion of work by writers such as Ozaki Kōyō.

In 1924, Matsutarō Shōriki took over management of the company. His innovations included improved news coverage, a full-page radio program guide, and the establishment of Japan's first professional baseball team, now known as the Yomiuri Giants. The emphasis of the paper shifted to broad news coverage aimed at readers in the Tokyo area. By 1941 it had the largest circulation of any daily newspaper in the Tokyo area. In 1942, under wartime conditions, it merged with the Hochi Shimbun and became known as the Yomiuri-Hochi.

The Yomiuri was the center of a labor scandal in 1945 and 1946. In October 1945, a post-war "democratization group" called for Shōriki's removal, as he supported Imperial Japan's policies during World War II. When Shōriki responded by firing five of the leading members of this group, the writers and editors launched the first "production control" strike on 27 October 1945. This method of striking became an important union tactic in the coal, railroad, and other industries during the postwar period. Matsutarō Shōriki was arrested in December 1945 as a Class-A war criminal and sent to Sugamo Prison. The Yomiuri's employees continued to produce the paper without heeding executive orders until a police raid on June 21, 1946. The charges against Shōriki were dropped and he was released in 1948. According to research by Professor Tetsuo Arima of Waseda University on declassified documents stored at NARA, he agreed to work with the CIA as an informant.

Under the leadership of Tsuneo Watanabe, who served as editor-in-chief from 1991 until his death in 2024, Yomiuri would gain considerable international prominence. By 1994, it would have a daily circulation which topped 10 million. In addition, it would also hold considerable influence over Japanese politics, with Watanabe even boasting that was Japan's "last dictator." In 2010, it would be recognized by Guinness World Records for having the highest daily newspaper circulation in the world, and also as the only newspaper with a morning circulation in excess of 10 million copies.

In February 2009, the Yomiuri entered into a tie-up with The Wall Street Journal for editing, printing and distribution. Since March 2009 the major news headlines of the Journal's Asian edition have been summarized in Japanese in the evening edition of the Yomiuri.

The Yomiuri features an advice column, Jinsei Annai.

The Yomiuri has a history of promoting nuclear power in Japan. In May 2011, when Naoto Kan, then Prime Minister of Japan, asked the Chubu Electric Power Company to shut down several of its Hamaoka Nuclear Power Plants due to safety concerns, the Yomiuri called the request "abrupt" and a difficult situation for Chubu Electric's shareholders. It wrote that Kan "should seriously reflect on the way he made his request." It then followed up with an article wondering how dangerous Hamaoka really was and called Kan's request "a political judgment that went beyond technological worthiness." The next day damage to the pipes inside the condenser was discovered at one of the plants following a leak of seawater into the reactor.

In 2012, the paper reported that Nobutaka Tsutsui, the Minister for Agriculture, had divulged secret information to a Chinese enterprise. Tsutsui sued the Yomiuri Shimbun for libel and was awarded 3.3 million yen in damages in 2015, on the basis that the truth of the allegations could not be confirmed.

In November 2014, the newspaper apologized after using the phrase "sex slave" to refer to comfort women, following its criticism of the Asahi Shimbun's coverage of Japan's World War II comfort women system.

The Yomiuri newspaper said in an editorial in 2011 "No written material supporting the claim that government and military authorities were involved in the forcible and systematic recruitment of comfort women has been discovered", and that it regarded the Asian Women's Fund, set up to compensate for wartime abuses, as a failure based on a misunderstanding of history. The New York Times reported on similar statements previously, writing that "The nation's (Japan's) largest newspaper, Yomiuri Shimbun, applauded the revisions" regarding removing the word "forcibly" from referring to laborers brought to Japan in the pre-war period and revising the comfort women controversy. Yomiuri editorials have also opposed the DPJ government and denounced denuclearization as "not a viable option".

On 7 August 2025, Yomiuri filed a lawsuit in Tokyo against the U.S.-based AI firm Perplexity, alleging "free-riding" on 120,000 articles for the publication from February to June 2025. In September, Yomiuri apologized for a false report on an extra on 23 July that Prime Minister Shigeru Ishiba decided to resign on 22 July.

== Other publications and ventures ==
Yomiuri also publishes the daily English-language newspaper The Japan News (formerly called The Daily Yomiuri), established in 1955. Besides its news website, The Japan News also publishes a weekly e-paper.

It publishes the daily Hochi Shimbun, a sport-specific daily newspaper, as well as weekly and monthly magazines and books.

Yomiuri Shimbun Holdings owns the Chūōkōron publishing company, which it acquired in 1999, and the Nippon Television network. It is a member of the Asia News Network. The paper is known as the financial patron of the baseball team Yomiuri Giants. They also sponsor the Japan Fantasy Novel Award annually. It has been a sponsor of the FIFA Club World Cup every time it has been held in Japan since 2006.

From 1949 through 1963, the newspaper sponsored the Yomiuri Indépendant Exhibition, an unjuried annual art exhibition which gave rise to avant-garde and contemporary rising artists.

== Digital resources ==
In November 1999, the Yomiuri Shimbun released a CD-ROM titled "The Yomiuri Shimbun in the Meiji Era," which provided searchable archives of news articles and images from the period that have been digitalized from microfilm. This was the first time a newspaper made it possible to search digitalized images of newspaper pictures and articles as they appeared in print.

Subsequent CD-ROMs, "The Taishō Era", "The pre-war Showa Era I", and "The pre-war Showa era II" were completed eight years after the project was first conceived. "Postwar Recovery", the first part of a postwar Shōwa Era series that includes newspaper stories and images until 1960, is on the way.

The system of indexing each newspaper article and image makes the archives easier to search, and the CD-ROMs have been well received by users as a result. This digital resource is available in most major academic libraries in the United States.

== Locations ==
- Tokyo Head Office

1-7-1, Otemachi, Chiyoda, Tokyo, Japan

- Osaka Head Office

5-9, Nozakicho, Kita-ku, Osaka, Japan

- West Japan Head Office

1-16-5, Akasaka, Chūō-ku, Fukuoka, Japan

== Yomiuri Group ==
The Yomiuri Shimbun Holdings (株式会社読売新聞グループ本社, KK Yomiuri Shimbun Gurūpu Honsha; "Yomiuri Shimbun Group Headquarters") conglomerate comprises many entities, including:

- Yomiuri Giants
- Nippon TV
- Yomiuri Telecasting Corporation
- Chuokoron-Shinsha, Inc.
- Yomiuriland, an amusement park
- Yomiuri Advertising Agency (also known as "Yomiko", later sold to Hakuhodo)

== In popular culture ==
- Jake Adelstein's 2009 memoir Tokyo Vice is based on his time as the first American crime reporter at Yomiuri Shimbun, and was also the basis for a series of the same name airing on HBO Max in 2022.
