= February 1 General Strike (1947) =

1947 labor action

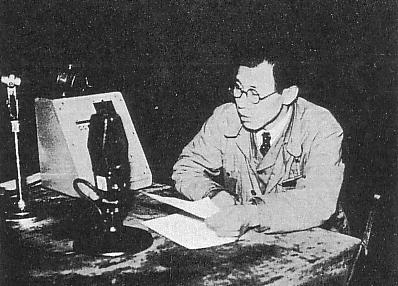
Yashiro Ii explaining the reasons of the cancellation of the February 1 General Strike under preparation

The February 1 Strike (二・一ゼネスト, Ni-ichi zenesuto) was a general strike planned by Japanese labor unions for February 1, 1947, with the goal of fighting for the implementation of the ten demands proposed the previous December, including an increase in wages to match inflation, the resignation of the Shigeru Yoshida cabinet, and the abolition of the income tax. The strike was eventually called off just before it was scheduled to begin by order of General Douglas MacArthur, the Supreme Commander for the Allied Powers.

== Background ==
The Empire of Japan was defeated in World War II and was occupied by Allies of World War II. The occupation authorities, known as SCAP (Supreme Commander for the Allied Powers) or GHQ (General Headquarters), initially introduced a series of reforms in Japan, such as the release of a large number of political prisoners and support for left-wing forces and workers, which led to a resurgence of the workers' movement in Japan. Both left-wing parties and Japanese labor unions, once banned, have been unbanned and are growing rapidly. By the end of November, nearly five million workers joined the labor unions.

Japanese workers began a wave of strikes, led by the Japanese Communist Party, left-wing socialists, and labor organizations. Some of these strikes were intended to improve working conditions and protect workers' rights, but others were aimed at changing or even completely overhauling the political system of the country. Prime Minister Shigeru Yoshida underlined that both capitalists and workers were collaborating for the common goal of boosting output in May 1946, accusing the radical labor movement of exploiting democracy. The Cabinet's Imperial Ordinance No. 311, which mandates fines and hard prison sentences of up to 10 years for participating in "acts prejudicial to Occupation objectives," was the first step in SCAP's response, which was swiftly followed by the employment of police enforcement. Nevertheless, strike activity persisted on several fronts, and some of them were successful, such as the strike in September 1946, which was carried out with MacArthur's consent and had some success. Yoshida, however, denounced the second strike in October, and the ensuing dispute ultimately forced MacArthur to entirely alter his attitude. The Japanese emperor and MacArthur both agreed that the labor movement may be extremely susceptible to manipulation by political rivals in the same month.

On December 3, Japan's labor unions submitted ten demands to the government, including the provision of overtime pay, the establishment of a minimum wage system, the abolition of work income tax, and the raising of the tax exemption point for comprehensive income tax to 30,000 yen. However, except for the overtime pay, the government refused to accept these demands. On December 17, 500,000 people (according to the organizers), organized by the Japanese Federation of Labour, the Sanbetsu, and other national unions, participated in a national convention to secure livelihood rights and overthrow the Yoshida Cabinet at the Imperial Palace Plaza.

On December 6, 1946, the Far Eastern Commission, which was responsible for overseeing Japan during the occupation, set out the principles that Japanese trade unions needed to follow. The rights of Japanese workers were guaranteed in this principle, but at the same time, Japanese workers were forbidden to "directly interfere with the interests of the occupation".

== Detail ==
In the New Year's speech on January 1, 1947, Shigeru Yoshida attacked the labor movement and accused labor groups of being "lawless gangs" (『不逞の輩』, Futei no yakara), an act that made the situation even tenser. On January 15, (Note: Some sources say on January 11.) the National Labor Union Joint Struggle Committee consisting of 30 unions, including the Japanese Federation of Labour and the Sanbetsu, with 4 million members, was organized. Three days later, the National Labor Union Joint Struggle Committee issued an ultimatum demanding that the government must meet the ten demands made in December 1946 by February 1, or else it would launch a national strike. The Japanese Communist Party also tried to mobilize as many unions as possible that were not members of the National Labor Union Joint Struggle Committee to participate in the strike.

On January 15, the government made a partial concession and Shigeru Yoshida publicly apologized for his comments on January 1. Shortly after the ultimatum was issued, Labor division's Cohen sent a letter to Economic and Scientific Section's General Marquet, warning him that the unions were organizing a strike and advising him to ask SCAP to force an end to the strike. SCAP rejected the request and argued that an informal verbal warning would have been sufficient to dissuade union leaders. On January 22, the government again conceded to a 150 yen salary increase for government employees. On the same day, Marquet and Cohen conveyed SCAP's order to "advise" union leaders not to strike. Union leaders, on the other hand, believed that SCAP will not violate the labor laws they have just enacted. About 2,400,000 workers from various industries were ready to join the strike. On the afternoon of January 31, MacArthur officially issued a handwritten strike injunction, which read in part:

Japanese society today operates under the limitations of war, defeat, and allied occupation... A general strike, crippling transportation and communications, would prevent the movement of food to feed the people and of coal to sustain essential utilities, and would stop such industry as is still functioning. The paralysis which inevitably would result might reduce large masses of the Japanese people to the point of actual starvation, and would produce dreadful consequences upon every Japanese home regardless of social strata or direct interest in the basic issue.

At 8:00 p.m. that night, labor leader Yashiro Ii made a speech on NHK, tearfully announcing the official cancellation of the general strike on February 1. He quoted Vladimir Lenin, saying that the cancellation was "one step back, two steps forward".

== Aftermath ==
Some militant labor leaders accused the U.S. of intervening in the Japanese workers' movement after the strike was called off, criticizing MacArthur's strike ban as "oppressive, undemocratic, and discriminatory against labor".

The general strike not only represented MacArthur's violation of the laws he had signed, but also allowed the moderate right-wing Socialist Party to accuse the left of being too radical and to gain more power. Since MacArthur only banned the strike, the unions in the strike gained more and more members afterwards.
