= Removal of Restrictions on Political, Civil, and Religious Liberties =

The Removal of Restrictions on Political, Civil, and Religious Liberties, also known as the (SCAPIN-93) directive, the "Human Rights Directive", or "Civil Liberties Directive", was a directive issued by the Supreme Commander for the Allied Powers on October 4, 1945, during the Occupation of Japan. The purpose of the Removal of Restrictions was to dismantle the oppressive policies that were imposed on the Japanese citizenry before the end of World War II. The directive mandated the abolition of laws preventing criticism of the Japanese Imperial system, the repeal of fifteen existing laws (including the Peace Preservation Law and the Thought Control Law, also known as the Ideological Prisoner Custody and Surveillance Law), and the release of 3,000 political prisoners.

Prime Minister Naruhiko Higashikuni resigned five days after the directive was issued because he was not able to implement the reforms stipulated. His successor, Kijūrō Shidehara, released 3,000 political prisoners, and abolished the "Thought Control Law" and 15 other laws and statutes.
