= Sanbetsu =

Japanese trade union

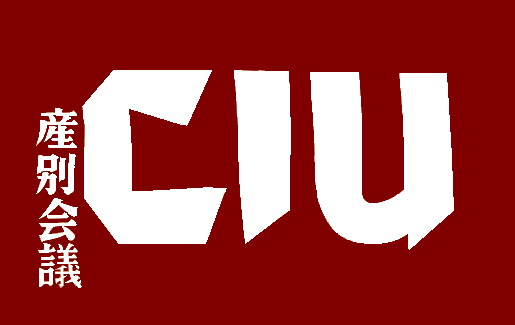
- Founded: August 1946
- Dissolved: 1958
- Location: Japan
- Members: 1,500,000 (1946)
- Affiliations: WFTU

Sanbetsu (産別) (Zen Nippon Sangyo-betsu Rodo Kumiai Kaigi (全日本産業別労働組合会議; "All Japan Congress of Industrial Unions")) was a Japanese trade union centre between 1946 and 1958. When it was founded in 1946 it emerged as the main force in the Japanese post-war labour movement and led a campaign of militant strikes. However, it suffered a major backlash after only a few months in existence when a planned general strike was aborted. Internal divisions followed, and the organization was never able to recover its initial strength.

== Founding ==
Sanbetsu was founded in August 1946. During its early phase it counted with around 1.5 million members. Sanbetsu was organized on initiative of the Japanese Communist Party, and the key leaders of the organization were communists. The organization was able to mobilize a large section of white-collar workers in government and civil service sectors. Salaries in the public sectors were about a half of salaries in the private sector, a fact that enabled the public sector to become a centre of radical trade unionism. Sanbetsu also established a foothold in the transportation sector. Kokurō ('National Railway Workers Union') was an important Sanbetsu union.

== October labour offensive ==
In October 1946 Sanbetsu launched an offensive wave of strikes. Over one hundred strikes, involving around 180,000 workers, were organized. The energy, coal mine and electrical equipment industry sectors were centres of strike activity. The key demands of the "October labour offensive" was establishment of minimum wage based on cost of living, improved retirement-pay system and democratization of the energy industry. In the midst of the October offensive Hosoya Matsuta (deputy general secretary of Sanbetsu) declared that the struggle of the unions was no longer merely economic but also political. He declared that the unions would topple the Yoshida cabinet through a general strike and establish a popular democratic government. Following the October offensive two Sanbetsu unions, Kokurō and Zentei ('Communication Ministry Workers Union'), launched a struggle for higher salaries. During this campaign calls for the overthrow of Yoshida were raised. By the end of the year, Sanbetsu was clearly the dominant force in the Japanese labour movement.

Sanbetsu took part in the Economic Recovery Conference together with other unions and employers' organizations. However, the organization was reluctant to become part of the corporativist system that the Economic Recovery Conference projected.

== Aborted general strike of 1947 ==
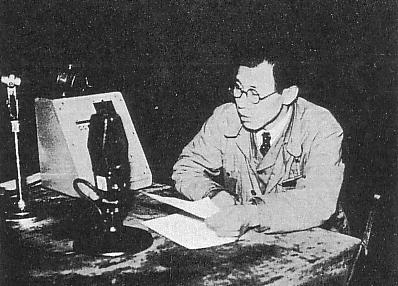
Ii Yashiro

Sanbetsu planned a major general strike for February 1, 1947. Hosoya Matsuta and the Kokurō leader Ii Yashiro founded Zentō ('Joint Strike Action National Committee'), consisting of Sanbetsu, Sodomei, Nichirō Kaigi, the Communist Party and the Japan Socialist Party. The demand of the strike was improvement of conditions for public sector employees. Four million workers were expected to take part in the strike. During the preparations for the strike, the political atmosphere was tense. The Sanbetsu president was severely wounded in an assassination attempt in January 1947.

However, the Supreme Commander of the Allied Powers intervened and blocked the strike, claiming that the strike was contrary to the welfare of the Japanese people. The preparations for the strike had led to divisions between communists and non-communists within Sanbetsu. In its aftermath, the failed strike resulted in a political backlash for Sanbetsu and the Communist Party. Restrictions on union organizing in the public sector was imposed and key communists were fired from their employments. As a result, defections and splits occurred in Sanbetsu.

Sanbetsu opposed Japanese re-entry into the International Labour Organization.

== Mindō split ==
In 1948, dissidents of Sanbetsu founded Sanbetsu Mindō ('League for the Democratization of Sanbetsu'), opposed to the dominance of the Communist Party in Sanbetsu. Hosoya Matsuta led the rebellion. The Mindō movement began in Kokurō. The development of the Mindō movement was actively encouraged by the American occupation authorities. In 1949 the Mindō movement was expelled from Sanbetsu, but the strength of Sanbetsu had been severely curtailed by the divisions and expulsions.

== Decline ==
By 1950, in the aftermath of the feud with Mindō, Sanbetsu had around 290,000 members. The All Japan Harbour Workers' Union left Sanbetsu in February 1950. By 1951, Sanbetsu membership stood at around 47,000. In 1953 the combined membership of Sanbetsu unions was merely 13,000.

Sanbetsu dissolved itself in 1958.

== Organizational profile ==
The organization worked on the basis of the principle "one factory plant, one union", which was the line of the World Federation of Trade Unions. Sanbetsu joined the WFTU in 1950.

Sanbetsu issued the publication Rengo Sensen.

== Presidents ==
1946: Katsumi Kikunami
1947: Sugado
1949: Sukeharu Yoshida
1956: Fukuhei Ichikawa
