= CIA activities in Japan =

Activities by the U.S. Central Intelligence Agency in occupied and post-occupation Japan

Seal of the Central Intelligence Agency

The activities of the Central Intelligence Agency (CIA) in Japan date back to the Allied occupation of Japan. In the context of the Cold War against the Soviet Union, Douglas MacArthur's Chief of Intelligence, Charles Willoughby, authorized the creation of a number of Japanese subordinate intelligence-gathering organizations known as kikan. Many of these kikan contained individuals purged because of their classification as war criminals. The CIA organized and financed Operation "Takematsu", utilizing the kikan as part of an intel gathering operation against North Korea, and the Soviet possessions of the Kuril Islands, and Sakhalin. One of the kikan created, the "Hattori group", led by Takushiro Hattori, allegedly plotted to stage a coup d'état and assassinate Prime Minister Shigeru Yoshida on account of his opposition to Japanese nationalism.

Under the direction of the American Far East Command, Willoughby amassed an on-paper force of over 2,500 intelligence personnel. The CIA and military intelligence established numerous extrajudicial agencies including the "Canon Organ" which allegedly engaged in illegal abductions and torture of left-wing political activists, including novelist Kaji Wataru.

The CIA was instrumental in laying the groundwork for the formation of the present Japanese political system. The agency was financially involved in the creation of the Liberal Party by abetting the requisitioning of assets seized from China. The agency also participated in an influence campaign in order to sway the Liberals' successor, the Liberal Democratic Party (LDP), towards accepting Nobusuke Kishi as prime minister. The CIA was active in advising the LDP on policy in regards to military installations in Japan and security interests. This process of aiding the Liberal Democratic Party also involved the agency establishing what has come to be described as an "iron triangle" dealing in the trade of tungsten, for the purpose of covertly financing the LDP. In addition to supporting the LDP financially, multiple authors have alleged that the CIA actively subverted and interfered with the Japan Socialist Party and anti-American protests in Okinawa. (Note: "The CIA advises manipulating Okinawans' pacifist spirit by propagating messages about how the military can help in regional humanitarian and disaster relief efforts. The manual urges U.S. policy makers to mimic the Japanese Self Defense Forces' Public Relations model of emphasizing "peace, family and community."- Mitchell 2018)

Prior to the signing of the Treaty of San Francisco, CIA operatives arrived in Japan as part of Project BLUEBIRD to test "behavioral techniques" on suspected double agents. US intelligence helped allegedly establish and administer several clandestine funds collectively known as the M-fund. The M-fund was allegedly used to enrich CIA contact Yoshio Kodama, who ostensibly used the fund to bankroll Yakuza protection for US President Dwight Eisenhower during his canceled 1960 visit to Japan.

== Background ==
The CIA's predecessor, the Office of Strategic Services (OSS), maintained extensive intelligence networks in the Japanese colonial territories during the Pacific War. After the signing of the Japanese Instrument of Surrender, a significant wealth of documents and materials were confiscated from Kenpeitai installations and Japanese diplomatic installations. However, many documents could not be recovered as the Japanese ordered many of the documents pertaining to human rights abuses, such as Unit 731 activities, to be destroyed. The Imperial Japanese Navy ordered the destruction of all wartime documents following the Hirohito surrender broadcast. The Japanese Foreign Ministry similarly ordered the destruction of all papers on August 7. War crimes investigators required translators and interpreters to translate Japanese documents and question Japanese suspects on their involvement in the Pacific War. This resulted in widespread utilization of Nisei linguists in translation duties pertaining to war crimes. The Military Intelligence Service and Counter Intelligence Corps, using Nisei translators, were able to translate a significant portion of the remaining documents, much of which would be later used as evidence in prosecution for the International Military Tribunal for the Far East.

Worried about the spread of Communism, US policy regarding containment necessitated actively combating communist elements across East Asia. US policy regarding Japan in this time period was fractured into two components with one side arguing that Maoist China served as a better security partner (with Kuomintang leader Chiang Kai-shek being perceived as unreliable and corrupt), and the other side arguing for the rearmament and revitalization of Japan into a security partner. MacArthur's policies initially sided with the pro-China camp, with the first few months of MacArthur's tenure revolving around a purge of the Japanese right and the demobilization of the Imperial Japanese Army as well as economic reorganization involving the dissolution of the vertically integrated zaibatsu monopolies. During this reform period, over 200,000 officials associated with militaristic policies were purged from holding office or arrested as war crime suspects. By 1947 MacArthur's occupation government, under the pressure of policy-makers in the US government now focusing on the Cold War, began releasing purgees from their civil-service blacklist and initiated the Red Purge. As a result of the loss of China to the Chinese Communist Party and the subsequent Sino-Soviet Treaty, the pro-China crowd lost much of its influence, giving the CIA and US military intelligence the rationale necessary to collaborate and support the Japanese right and the Yakuza.

Douglas MacArthur held a dislike of the Office of Strategic Services (OSS) and prevented the OSS, and its successor organization the CIA, from operating in Japan until 1950. As a result, many of the intelligence operations undertaken during the early phase of the occupation were delegated to military intelligence, particularly the G-2.

== During the occupation period ==
=== Formation of the Kikan ===
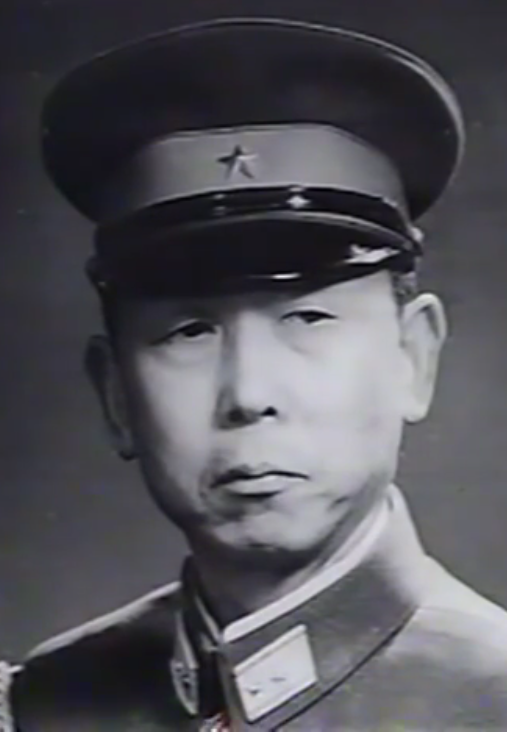
IJA photo of Arisue, who was heavily involved with US military intelligence during the Occupation

Prior to the US occupation period, the Kenpeitai and Tokkeitai maintained military intelligence units known as kikan (Japanese: 機関). These included the Fujiwara Kikan, the Iwakuro Kikan, the Hikari Kikan and the Kodama Kikan, headed by Yoshio Kodama. During the dismantling of the Imperial Japanese Army and IJN during the demobilization of Japan, the Kempeitai was dissolved and the IJA intelligence command was charged during the White Purge. This was reversed during the Reverse Course policy change during the late 1940s and early 1950s, subsequently, the majority of the Kempeitai officers which were arrested or under investigation were either released or evaded criminal charges for their conduct in the Pacific War.

The SCAP occupation apparatus established by MacArthur assigned each official organization its own Japanese experts, lacking the manpower necessary to carry out day-to-day operations without the existing bureaucracy. The lack of oversight in intelligence operations gave significant operational flexibility to many of the Japanese recruits, allowing them to defy orders and distort information in the process of intelligence-gathering. Willoughby's organization recruited former lieutenant general Seizō Arisue as an intelligence asset. Arisue would become instrumental in the formation of the kikan, and an organizer and planner, along with Kawabe Torashirō, of Operation Takematsu. In September 1945, Willoughby asked Arisue to establish a clandestine intelligence gathering group within the G-2 to combat communist elements in Japan as a means to prevent a socialist revolution. By 1947 the G-2, requiring an increasing number of operatives to carry out operations, began actively using former Japanese military and intelligence personnel for use against the Soviet Union and Japanese Communist Party. Militarist networks were able to avoid prosecution via their association with the G-2, giving them legal standing to engage in illicit activity meant to strengthen the Japanese right.

In 1948, emboldened by the Reverse Course, the G-2 and the various kikan created during the occupation period formulated two programs to establish espionage networks internally and externally. The proposed operation "Take", which consisted of intelligence concerning foreign targets, and "Matsu", domestic intelligence gathering, allowed for substantial operational freedom and flexibility for intelligence assets. Willoughby and the G-2 would only supervise the upper echelons of the operation, giving on the ground personnel the ability to act without much purview. The operation itself involved the establishment of clandestine networks on North Korea, Sakhalin, and the Kuril Islands. Using smuggling networks and shell corporations, the operations would ship operatives to their assigned destinations, where they would monitor radio traffic and other intelligence sources. Formulated by Kawabe Torashirō, who fell under suspicion for war crimes but was never charged, the operation had an estimated cost of 10 million yen.

Despite substantial investments by the G-2 and by the CIA, the operations yielded mixed results by 1951. Operations in the north of Japan stagnated by 1949 and a lack of Japanese agents compounded issues like a shortage of intelligence officers, causing a lack of coordination in many operational areas. By 1948 operations in North Korea were wholly canceled, with the focus of the groups shifting to Taiwan. In Taiwan, the kikan established a volunteer network for the defense of Taiwan against communist incursions and formulated a plan to retake the mainland. The main issue with Takematsu was the ambition of the operatives, who often cabled false and misleading information to improve their standing with US officials. By 1952 the operation was canceled, with many of the networks being compromised.

==== Hattori Kikan ====
The Hattori Group was one of the kikan formed during the Reverse Course. It worked in conjunction with the Tsuji kikan, led by Masanobu Tsuji, in clandestine operations. Before his contact with US military intelligence and subsequent formation of the group, Colonel Hattori Takushirō, who had served as the chief of staff to Prime Minister Hideki Tojo, ordered his subordinates to deliberately conceal official documents and their own personal writings during the occupation period. Hattori's activities with the CIA began because of his own personal belief that Japan could not be rearmed through "democratic methods", arguing for the reconstruction of the Imperial Japanese Army and his appointment as the chief of staff of the institution. Hattori supported a revival of conscription with voluntary enlistments as a precursor. It is believed that Willoughby himself was heavily involved in the construction of the agency, as Agency documents have referred to the group as "Willoughby's Stable". Tsuji, whom Hattori was close friends with, used the group in planning an operation for Chiang Kai-Shek's invasion of mainland China. Tsuji himself owed the agency for the fact that he had war crimes charges, caused by his instigation of the Bataan Death March, dropped against him. However, the plan was abandoned because the operational details of the plan were leaked to the Chinese communists.

The Hattori kikan was implicated in an assassination plot targeting prime minister Shigeru Yoshida in July 1952. Hattori disliked Yoshida for his supposed opposition towards former purgees and Japanese nationalists, also disliking the Yoshida doctrine, stating that it over-relied on US military protection against external threats. The plot allegedly had the backing of 500,000 people and support from various factions in the National Safety Agency. (Note: "Two CIA documents said the plot reportedly had the support of 500,000 people in Japan, and that the group planned to use a contact who controlled a faction inside the National Safety Agency – a precursor to the Defense Ministry – to help launch the coup." – Coleman 2007) In the coup attempt, Hattori would first stage an assassination of Yoshida, whereupon Ichiro Hatoyama, Yoshida's rival, would become prime minister in his place. Tsuji managed to convince Hattori out of the plot, arguing that the Japanese Socialist Party served a greater danger.

=== Project BLUEBIRD ===
Project BLUEBIRD, a division of Project ARTICHOKE, was a mind control operation involving the testing of human subjects with drugs meant to induce hypnosis for the purpose of "enhanced interrogation". At the start of BLUEBIRD, a team traveled to Japan in July 1950 to test out the techniques on human subjects. The subjects used were suspected double agents. During the operation, the security office of the agency ordered the operatives to conceal and not disclose the reason for their residence and employment in Japan, using a cover explaining they were part of polygraph work. In October 1950, the program was expanded to include North Korean prisoners of war, with 25 subjects being selected and chosen for the role. The safehouse used to perform the operation was located in Atsugi, Kanagawa. The experiments were intended to induce amnesia by the injection of drugs such as sodium amytal and other barbiturates. The team judged the experiments in 1950 as a success, causing the agency to expand and continue the program across Europe and Southeast Asia.

=== Canon Organ ===
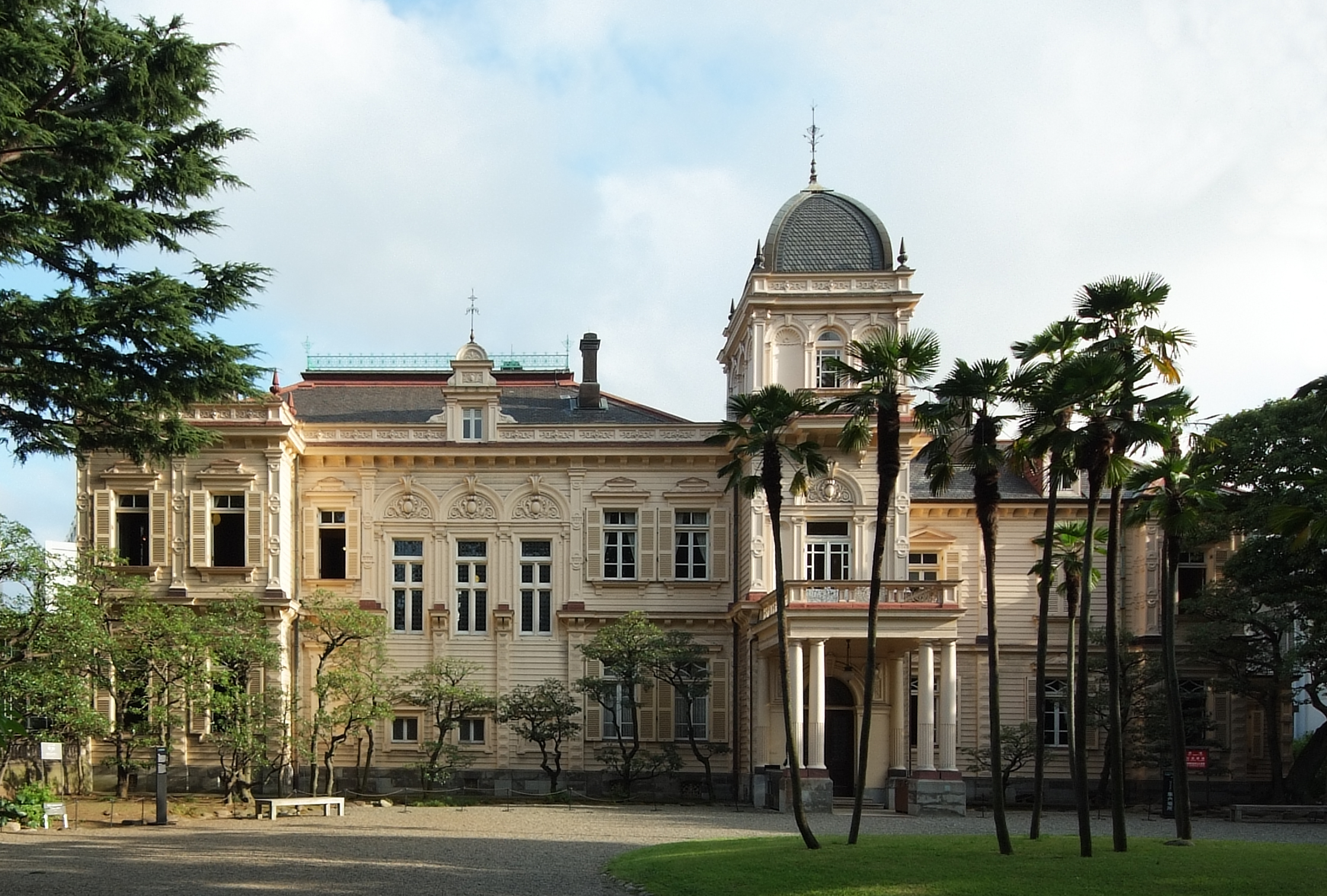
The Hongo House, with Canon's office having been on the second floor

News reports and declassified CIA documents have repeatedly mentioned the existence of a "Canon Organ" staffed by 30 persons. The organization is also known as the Canon Agency or the Z Unit. The agency was formed, according to former member Han To-pong, by the Counterintelligence Corps and was under the purview of the G-2. To-pong stated that the intelligence gathering portion of the organ answered to Allen Dulles. Lieutenant Colonel Jack Canon lead the agency. The organization's headquarters was located at the "Hongo House" in Tokyo. It worked in conjunction with the Katoh Agency, a clique consisting of five former Imperial Japanese Army officers. The Canon Organ's primary focus was the gathering of intelligence from Communist China. Each agent was paid with 100,000 to 150,000 yen for each overseas operation. The unit's second in command, Yeon Jeon, described an espionage mission spanning Japan, the Korean Peninsula and China where the agency recruited 13 operatives and parachuted them into Korea. The agency also maintained a large commercial fleet of commercial vessels and held various subsidiary corporations to help facilitate espionage operations. The agency had many links with prominent government officials including Prime Minister Yoshida, whom Canon and Jeon met in 1952. Yoshida directed them to meet his ally, Ogata Takatora, in a bid to establish a Japanese counterpart to the Central Intelligence Agency.

The agency was involved in the disappearance and subsequent torture of many left-wing individuals. The Counter Intelligence Corps and the Canon Agency allegedly detained Itagaki Kōzō, a former houseboy to Maxim Tarkin, an individual with suspected ties to the GRU. Itagaki had earlier worked on the Kōhoku Maru, a ship used by smugglers to smuggle illicit goods and persons between Mainland Asia and Japan. When Itagaki was handed a package by the smugglers, which he later opened due to curiosity, he was assaulted and abandoned by an unknown assailant. Because of his unusual rout and status as a refugee from Sakhalin, US intelligence began interrogating Itagaki because of his suspected position as a Soviet intelligence operative. He was later handed over to the Canon Agency and moved to the Iwasaki residence, an agency safehouse. Itagaki was then repeatedly deprived of food and sleep, was forced to strip, and was threatened with knives and a pistol by Jack Canon and other unit operatives. Itagaki, in his testimony, then stated that he was forced to enlist in the agency to monitor Nihon University and was later ordered to become a deckhand to one of the smuggling vessels owned by the agency. He also described Z unit smuggling Korean refugees from Busan to be interrogated in Japan and an unknown Korean man who had suffered a mental breakdown while in custody. Other interrogation methods for captives held by the agency included mock executions and other forms of torture.

The organ was closed in 1952 when the Allied occupation of Japan ended and all intelligence organizations were re-designated as CIA assets. Canon resigned that year, followed by most of the agency's staff.

==== Kaji Wataru Incident ====
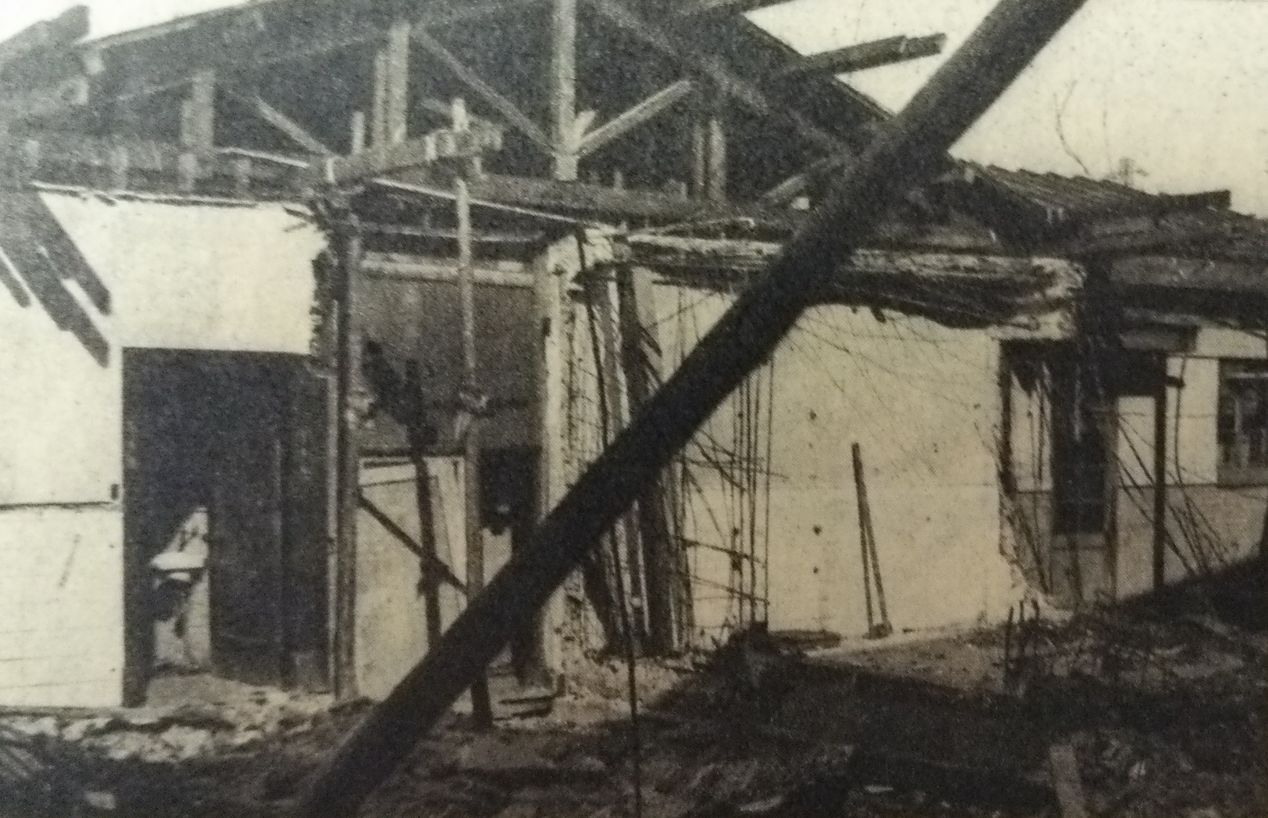
The building where Kaji Wataru was initially confined in

The agency was implicated in the abduction of Kaji Wataru, a left-wing novelist. The abduction has been referred to in Japan as the "Kaji Wataru Incident" (鹿地亘事件, Kaji Wataru jiken). Wataru had worked as re-educator concerning Japanese prisoners of war in Chongqing due to his persecution under Showa Statism. Kaji alleged that he was abducted by US military intelligence officers in the Kanagawa neighborhood of Kuganuma and then confined in a facility in Yokohama on the night of November 25, 1951. He was then extensively interrogated, accused of being a spy for the Soviet Union and was pressured to become a double agent for US intelligence. Kaji was physically tortured and interrogated over the next few days. After Kaji was repeatedly physically abused by the Canon agency, he attempted suicide by drinking a bottle of household cleaner. Before his suicide attempt, he wrote a testament to his friend Uchiyama Kanzō, a bookstore owner in Shanghai. At the time, Kaji was suffering from chronic tuberculosis and was given medical treatment to assist in his recovery from the suicide attempt. Kaji was then moved to a second safehouse in the Shibuya ward, where he was moved to Chigasaki and then to Okinawa.

In September 1952, a letter was mailed to various Tokyo-area news agencies suggesting that Kaji was being held against his will by US intelligence agencies. Uchiyama visited leftist Diet member Kōzō Inomata, giving him information on Kaji's disappearance. Yamada Zenjiro also made a public statement, with Inomata subsequently bringing up the allegations with the police. Due to the public pressure, US authorities released Kaji and drove him to a railway station near his home in Tokyo. Due to the weight of the allegations, a government inquiry was started into the circumstances of his disappearance. Kaji testified before a special committee of the National Diet. If the allegations that Kaji had been held against his will for more than a year by a foreign power were true, it would have constituted a violation of Japan's national sovereignty.

The US Embassy subsequently countered the allegations, arguing that Kaji admitted he was a Soviet intelligence asset and that Kaji had willingly taken refuge with US authorities. Han to-pong, a coordinator and member of the agency, stated in an interview with Shukan Shincho that Kaji had been bribed by the Japanese Communist Party, and that Kaji voluntarily became a US intelligence asset. To-pong also said that Kaji had been given treatment for his tuberculosis, an allegation confirmed by Kaji. However, Kaji stated that he had never heard of an "agent To-Pong" in response to his interview.

=== Role in the cover-up of Unit-731 ===
During the International Military Tribunal for the Far East, US occupation authorities deliberately omitted witnesses to obfuscate evidence in relation to the conviction of several Japanese right-wing officials. This process of covering up crimes against humanity committed by Japanese officials extended to Japanese biological warfare programs in Manchukuo. In 1946 and 1947, the State Department and US military intelligence officials began a pressure campaign to convince Shirō Ishii, director of Unit 731, to take a deal with the US in regard to the transfer of information researched during Unit 731's activities in the region. This caused Ishii to take a deal where to avoid prosecution, he would give US intelligence officials information on human experimentation procured during his time as director. To the great consternation of the SCAP and US officials, the Soviet Union began its own campaign to gain information in relation to biological weapons. Soviet officials blackmailed former Unit 731 members to reveal their research, lest they be prosecuted at the Khabarovsk war crimes trials. The US intervened, forcing interrogations to be performed only in the presence of US military officials, obscuring the true extent of Japanese human experimentation to preserve their own research edge over the Soviet Union in the field.

== Interference in Japanese politics ==
Logo of the Liberal Democratic Party

=== Role in the Reverse Course ===
The CIA and US military intelligence played a pivotal role in the 1947 "Reverse Course" policy shift and the subsequent end of the purge policy concerning classified war criminals. In conjunction with the Japan lobby and American corporate interests, US military intelligence engaged in a pressure campaign to reverse Douglas MacArthur's policies around the Zaibatsu and civil service officials purged during the US occupation. The KGB, in several documents, accused the CIA and SCAP of staging attacks on Japanese infrastructure, including the Matsukawa derailment, in order to justify the change in policy. Domestically, the agency pressured the State Department and military by authoring a report, titled the "Strategic Importance of Japan", arguing that control over Japan was invaluable as a "stabilizing force" in Asia. The report warned that a hypothetical Soviet alignment of Japan, which it warned was likely with the loss of Southeast Asia, would "tip the balance of the Cold War" in favor of the USSR. The report urged the State Department to make a shift from "monopoly-breaking" policy towards an approach incentivizing the development of "large financial and trading concerns".

=== Creation of the LDP ===
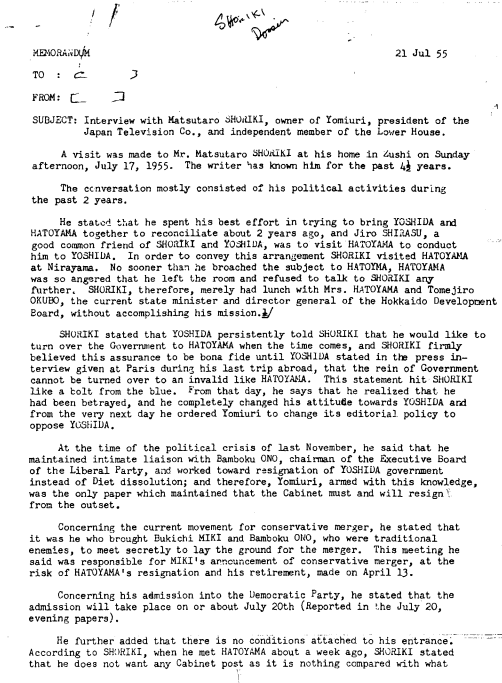
Memorandum describing Shoriki's involvement in the LDP's merger in 1955

CIA associates were extensively involved in the formation of the Liberal Democratic Party in 1955. In an interview with Matsutaro Shoriki, a TV mogul who was a crucial agency asset in regards to their propaganda campaign in Japan, Shoriki described his attempts to reconcile Shigeru Yoshida and Ichiro Hatoyama. During this process, Shoriki and Hatoyama had a falling out after Shoriki attempted to bring the subject up, with Hatoyama exiting Shoriki's residence in anger. Also Shoriki and Yoshida repeatedly met, with Yoshida promising to exchange power with Hatoyama once his retirement was concluded. However, when Yoshida refused to step down and turn over the office to Hatoyama in a defiant trip to Paris, Shoriki told his newspaper Yomiuri Shimbun to engage in a negative pressure campaign to force Yoshida out. (Note: "Shoriki had used his media empire to support the prime minister's political rival, Hatoyama" – Williams 2021)

Being unable to influence the merger directly through Yoshida and Hatoyama, Shoriki then arranged a meeting between Bukichi Miki and Banboku Ōno, who were enemies, to lay the groundwork for the Liberal Party's merger with the Democratic Party. This meeting was successful, with Miki announcing the conservative merger on April 13 at the expense of Hatoyama's political influence.

Nick Kapur, author of the book Japan at the Crossroads: Conflict and Compromise after Anpo, argues that Nobusuke Kishi, at the advice and encouragement of the Central Intelligence Agency, orchestrated the formation of the party in 1955.

=== Rise of Nobusuke Kishi ===
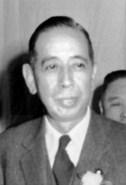
Kishi in 1956

In the aftermath of the Daigo Fukuryū Maru Incident in the Castle Bravo test, numerous members of Yoshida's government described the US as "war-loving" and voiced their opposition against US foreign policy, including Minister of International Trade and Industry Aichii Kiichi. As the CIA and US military authorities tired of Yoshida's inaction concerning the development of Japan's self defense forces and hesitance to revise and expand the 1951 US-Japan Security Treaty, they launched a pressure campaign to oust Yoshida and replace him with a more aggressive candidate. This culminated in Yoshida's resignation. Despite the efforts of US intelligence to replace Yoshida with Kishi, going so far to train him and launch a public relations campaign to make him more appealing, the office ultimately ended up in the hands of Ichiro Hatoyama, Yoshida's rival. To the frustration of the CIA, Hatoyama decided to continue the Yoshida Doctrine. Hatoyama was disinclined to revise the security treaty and also engaged in a policy of reconciliation with the Soviet Union over the Kuril Islands. This angered Allen Dulles, who threatened to permanently sever Okinawa from Japanese suzerainty.

After the resignation of Hatoyama, US intelligence services continued pressuring the LDP to accept Kishi as leader of the Japanese premiership. To the further exasperation of the US intelligence officials, the LDP nominated Tanzan Ishibashi, who was widely regarded as the least pro-American figures out of all of the available candidates that year. Ishibashi would declare that the "era of automatic compliance with American wishes on China was over," further straining relations with the Eisenhower administration. However, Ishibashi was forced into resignation due to his declining health after only two months in office, averting a diplomatic crisis. With support from American officials and the Kuromaku (political "fixer") Yoshio Kodama, Kishi won the premiership in early 1957. US ambassador to Tokyo, Douglas MacArthur II, described Kishi as the only individual capable of preventing a JSP rise in influence. MacArthur warned that the Japanese political climate, without Kishi, would grow increasingly anti-American.

Kishi's role in the attempt to revise the 1951 Japanese Security Treaty was motivated by the CIA and the Eisenhower administration's advice. Ambassador MacArthur worked with Kishi on a proposed revision to the security treaty, allowing the US to retain its military installations in the country. After the signature of the treaty and the subsequent Anpo protests, with the State Department and CIA seeing Kishi as a public relations liability, the US withdrew its support for Kishi's administration.

=== Promotion of Okinori Kaya ===
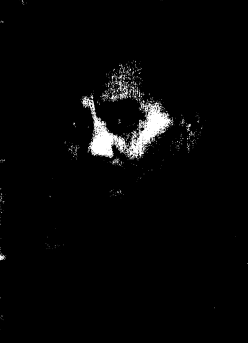
CIA picture of Okinori Kaya, who was a major figure in the Anpo protests

In 1958, Okinori Kaya, a war crimes suspect who was finance minister under Fumimaro Konoe and Hideki Tojo's government, was elected to the National Diet. Kaya had served an 11-year prison sentence from 1945 to his release from Sugamo in 1955. Anxious about Japan's security situation in East Asia, Kaya visited the US in 1959 in order to discuss security policy with representatives from several government agencies, including the State Department and the Naval Policy Planning Board. During his visit to the United States, Kaya met CIA director Allen Dulles. Dulles, eager to push forward the revision to the Japanese-US Security Treaty amid massive public backlash to Prime Minister Kishi's handling of the treaty, authorized the CIA to begin intelligence sharing with the LDP's Internal Security Committee. Dulles and the CIA contacted Kaya and recruited him as an agency source. By 1956, due to the perceived infrequency of Kaya's reporting, the agency downgraded him from a C tier source to an F tier source.

=== Financial aid to the LDP ===
Prior to Yoshio Kodama's imprisonment at Sugamo Prison, the Kodama Kikan transferred a substantial fund of diamonds and platinum, seized by the agency during the Second Sino-Japanese War and the Pacific War, to Kono Ichiro. These minerals were then sold on the black market using middleman Tsuji Karoku, selling for some 175 million dollars. The money was then used to finance the creation of the Liberal Party.

After the occupation, US intelligence agencies feared a takeover of Japan by the JCP, and engaged in a decade long campaign of providing financial aid to senior members of the LDP. From the formation of the LDP in 1955, the CIA constructed an informant network within the party using payments to both surveil and financially support the LDP. Eisaku Sato, brother to Nobusuke Kishi, requested in a meeting with the CIA substantial financial contributions from the agency. At the same time, Kishi himself visited Washington DC to accept agency campaign contributions in order to prop up the LDP in preparation for the 1958 general election.

Outside of financial aid to the LDP, the CIA also sent contributions to moderate members of the Japanese Socialist Party. This was done in order for the moderate factions of the JSP to foment a moderate breakaway faction and further divide the Japanese left along partisan lines.

==== Tungsten smuggling ====
Yoshio Kodama, in a bid with the CIA to enrich himself, participated in a scheme to smuggle tungsten to US defense companies in exchange for agency money. The activities of his "Kodama Agency" had been built up during the Second Sino Japanese War by the Kenpeitai, being heavily involved in the opiate trade. Kodama himself was involved in an IJA tungsten smuggling ring as early as 1932. Eugene Dooman, who was part of the Japan lobby and who quit the agency in 1945 to support the Reverse Course, engineered a plan to smuggle 10 million dollars' worth of military-grade tungsten from the stores of the Japanese military and Chinese sources to Pentagon defense contractors. Due to the unavailability of supply caused by the Cold War and communist control over half of the world's tungsten production, prices had tripled for higher grade varieties. Kodama's network was involved with the physical process of actively moving the materials, with the CIA underwriting the plot by supplying some 2.8 million dollars to facilitate the operation. The plot ultimately failed due to the low grade of the obtained Tungsten, causing Dooman to blackmail the agency over repayment by threatening to reveal that the agency had abducted two Japanese communists and was actively involved in the East Asian narcotics trade.

=== Propaganda activities ===
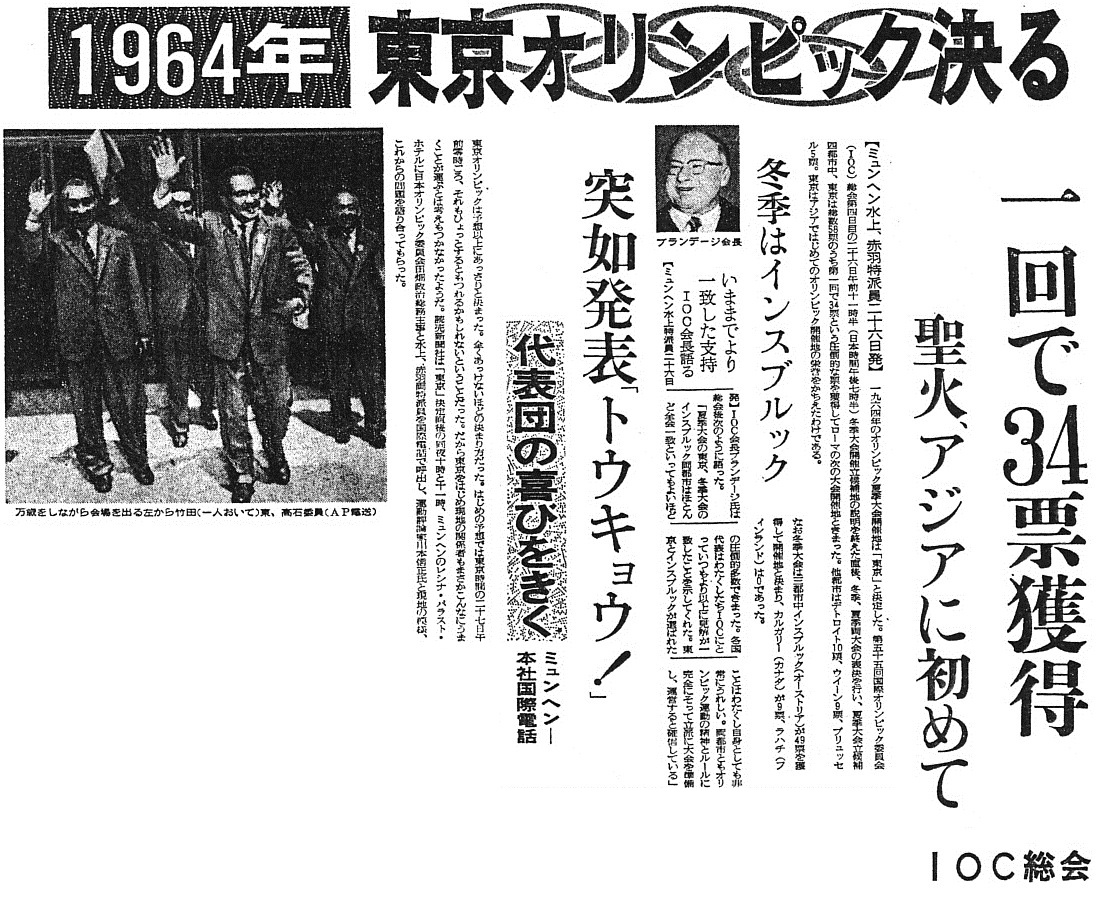
A Yomiuri Shimbun clipping from 1959, when Matsutaro owned the newspaper

The agency was involved in a Multi-decade campaign to strengthen the image of the United States in Japan and promote the Japanese right. In 1954, the CIA sponsored the creation of a "Central Investigation Agency" meant to sway news reporting from Jiji Press and Kyodo News. (Note: "The Agency operated from the offices of Japan's Jiji Press Agency, and its board of directors included leading figures from the two main postwar news agencies, Jiji and Kyodo." – Morris-Suzuki 2015) The CIA established a program called the "Psychological Strategy Plan for Japan". The goal of the plan was the manipulation of Japanese media into supporting a pro-US, anti-communist, and pro-rearmament position to sway Japanese public opinion. The United States Information Service also confidentially financed the production of Japanese media, pouring 184 million dollars into a program code-named PANEL-D-JAPAN. The CIA and USIS also targeted the Japanese intelligentsia, establishing magazines like Jiyū.

One of the CIA's greatest media assets was Japanese media Moghul Matsutarō Shōriki. Matsutaro owned the influential publication Yomiuri Shimbun. Matsutaro established Japan's first private television network Nippon Television. NTV would become a centerpiece of US psychological operations in Japan. Matsutaro operated under the CIA code-name PODAM and POJACKPOT-1. Operations by POJACKPOT-1 included a program to acquire 10 color TV receivers, which were shipped to Japan. The objective of this operation was to broadcast propaganda for the LDP ahead of the 1958 general election and demonstrate US advancements in consumer electronics. However, the sets arrived too late to be used in the 1958 election and the program fizzled. Shoriki also participated in a media campaign to promote nuclear power in Japan. His media organization established an exhibition to promote the benefits of nuclear power, termed "Atoms for Peace" after Eisenhower's speech to the UN General Assembly in 1953. The operation was endorsed and supported by the CIA.

=== Activities in Okinawa ===
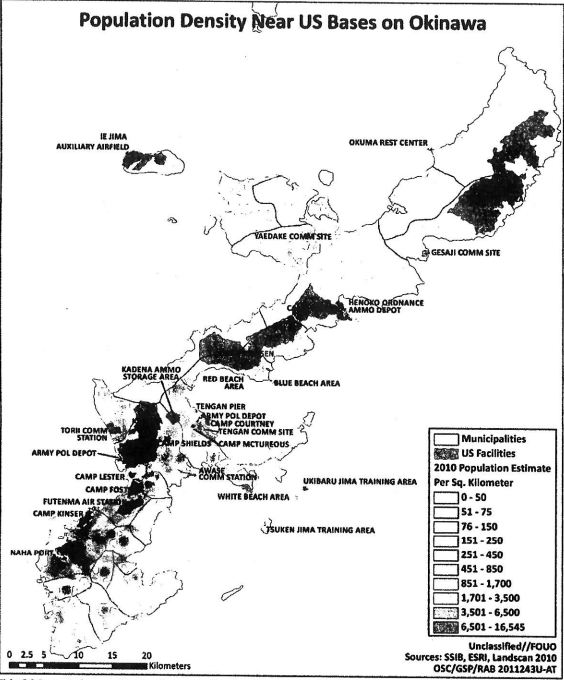
OSC Map of US Military Installations in Okinawa Prefecture

Okinawa was a territory described by the NSA as a "virtual aircraft carrier for American SIGNT collection". Despite opposition to intelligence and military deployments to the country from the Okinawa People's Party, recon flights of SR-71 and U-2 aircraft continued out of Kadena Air Base. US military installations in Okinawa, especially Kadena, were illustrated during the Vietnam War as air, naval, repair, and logistical facilities played a crucial part in US military operations in South Vietnam.

The CIA's influence in Okinawa became relevant as it repeatedly attempted to influence the course of elections on the island. The American Friends Service Committee accused the US of financing the LDP on the island to the tune of 1.8 million dollars. This was corroborated by a "secret action plan", declassified in 1997, detailing covert agency plans to influence elections in the Ryukyus via the secret funding of the LDP in response to an escalation of protests over reversion.

More recently, after the end of US military operations in Okinawa prefecture, the CIA continued attempts to sway Okinawan public opinion. In a document obtained via a Freedom of Information Act request, the CIA laid out a manual advising US officials on how to shape Okinawan public opinion. The CIA advised US officials to manipulate Okinawan pacifist opinion by stating the military's role in humanitarian and disaster relief. The agency also advised that US officials not mention military deterrence as a reason for the continued military presence on the island and deny any role of US servicemen in discrimination against Okinawans.

== Cooperation with organized crime ==
=== Contacts with the Yakuza ===
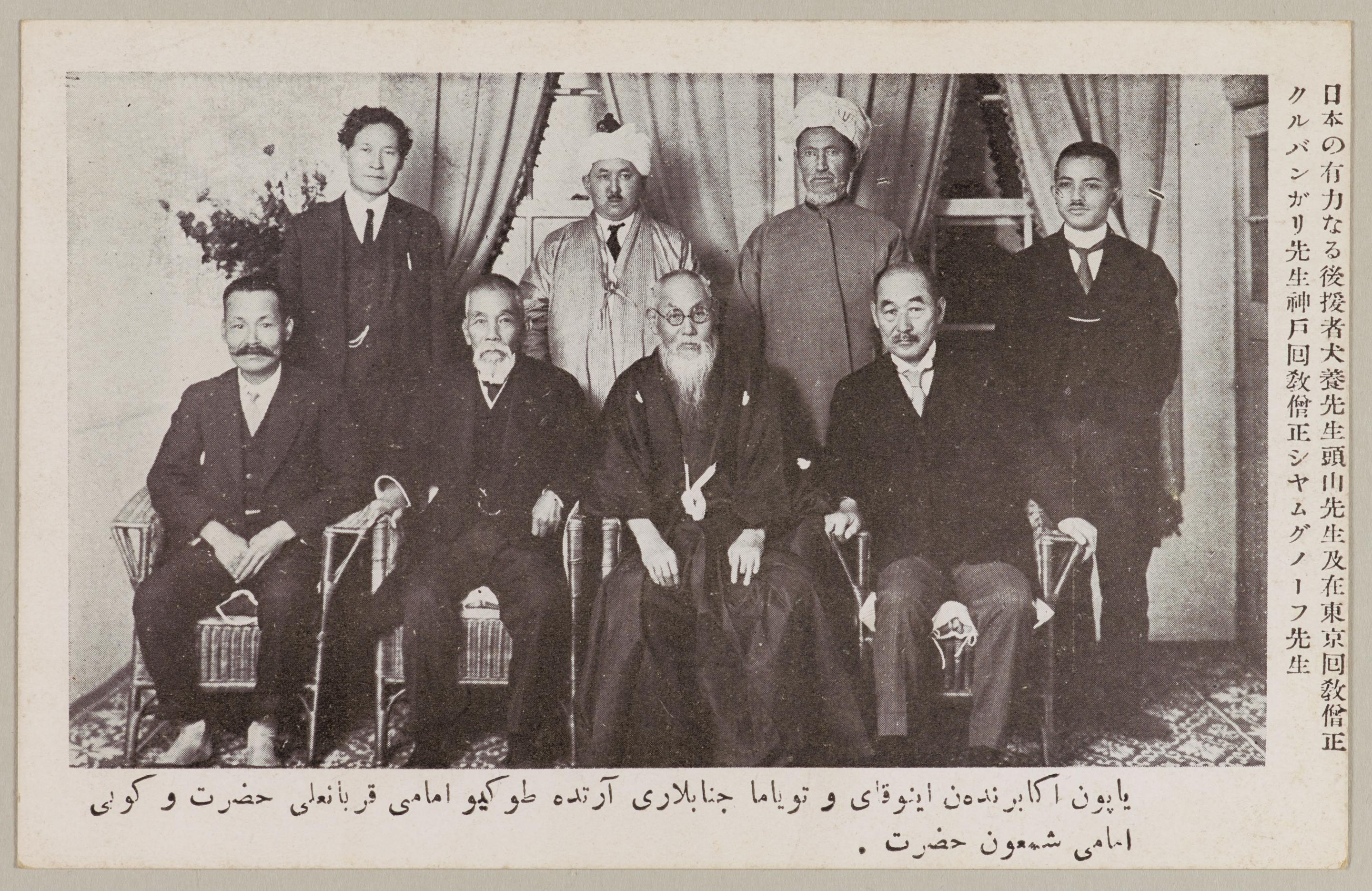
Tōyama with his associates Ryōzō Ioki, future prime minister Inukai Tsuyoshi, and Kazuo Kojima.

The Japanese right has had a longstanding relationship with the Yakuza. At the formation of the Dai Nihon Kokusuikai, a Yakuza ultranationalist umbrella organization, in 1919, Yakuza-rightist involvement had cultivated a total membership of over 200,000 persons. The Kokusuikai organization developed ties with an established right-wing political party, the Rikken Seiyūkai. The Seiyūkai party would often employ the Yakuza on strikebreaking operations including the Yawata Iron and Steel Works strike of 1920, the Singer Sewing Machine Company Strike of 1925 and the Noda Shoyu (forerunner to Kikkoman) strike of 1928. The Kokusuikai also utilized violence against various leftist groups during the Taishō period, with Yakuza members fighting with the Suiheisha, a group advocating for the Burakumin caste. This association of the Yakuza with strikebreaking and riot suppression extended to the Shōwa statist period, as the Dark Ocean Society utilized Yakuza gangs as strikebreakers against organized labor and socialist demonstrators during the statist transition period. The Kokuryu-kai, a successor to the Dark Ocean Society, actively participated in advancing the interests of Japanese ultranationalists. Tōyama Mitsuru, the founder of the Black Dragon Society, believed in the idea of hakkō ichiu and supported a war with the Soviet Union. Toyama's relevance, and the Yakuza right in general, continued increasing during the "Government by assassination" phase of the transition, as electoral democracy continued to weaken. Toyama was invited to dinner at the Tokyo Imperial Palace and managed to get his follower and ally, Fumimaro Konoe, appointed prime minister in 1937. With the rise of the Japanese right, the stated interests of the Kokusuikai yakuza became enmeshed with the army and the state as a whole. The Yakuza gangs exploited the government opium monopoly in China, collaborating with the military in the drug trade and resource exploitation in Manchukuo. After the Attack on Pearl Harbor however, many of the Yakuza whom the army had depended upon for support were imprisoned, being seen as a security risk. Another issue for the Yakuza during the war was the drafting of young men for service in the army, something which severely weakened the Yakuza. Due to these negative factors, the relationship between the government and the Yakuza was severed until the conclusion of the Pacific War.

The relationship between the Yakuza and Japanese right was reestablished following the occupation of Japan. Many of the American occupation officials became embroiled with Japanese organized crime during the early occupation period, with some officials paying the salaries of the leaders of the criminals. The disarmament of the civil police also created a power vacuum which allowed for conditions favoring the resurgence of the Yakuza. A difference in opinion in policy between Courtney Whitney, who supported continuing the White purge to the detriment of the Japanese right, and G-2 leader Charles A. Willoughby, who proposed adopting the Reverse Course policy shift, ultimately caused the US military intelligence services in Japan to begin financially aiding the Yakuza. The SCAP also adopted, initially, a more aggressive policy towards depurgees and organized crime than the CIA. It is speculated that Akira Ando, a proto-Yakuza leader who owned 18 brothels, managed to shift SCAP head Douglas MacArthur into a pro-monarchist stance. Many of the Yakuza gangs were heavily involved in the construction industry, further linking them with government officials. During the Reverse Course, MacArthur and the SCAP decided to turn a blind eye to the outgrowing criminal organizations, many of whom had links with illegal ultranationalist organizational bodies, for the reason of their anti-Communism. Many of the rehabilitated politicians had links with these ultranationalists organizations. Instead, the SCAP and MacArthur adopted the Red Purge, purging and dispossessing members of Labor unions, the Japanese Communist Party, and leftist academia. During the Red Purge Willoughby and his associates began paying right-wing criminals and Yakuza to repress the left. The Yakuza were used in strikebreaking operations as well as attacks on leaders of the Japanese left. Willoughby and his subordinates became described as "obsessed" and "paranoid" with finding plots concerning Communist infiltration. Willoughby and his Yakuza operatives allegedly staged a derailment of a Japanese National Railways locomotive in August 1949, in a rumored false flag operation meant to discredit the Communist Party. The G-2 and US military intelligence used the Yakuza in extrajudicial abductions of left wing figures, including novelist Kaji Wataru. Externally, the Yakuza were deployed in Korea as Yoshio Kodama, in negotiations with Douglas MacArthur, supplied thousands of Yakuza and IJA veterans as volunteers in Korea, where they posed as Korean soldiers.

Multiple Yakuza groups were formed by right wing political figures associated with the government or by intel initiative. Prior to the occupation period, many crime syndicates including the future Yamaguchi-gumi formed under explicitly endorsed military purview to facilitate the aforementioned opium trade. A subordinate member of the Canon Agency allegedly contacted Hisayuki Machii to form the Toa-kai to combat abusive Chinese dockyard workers in Yokohama.

=== Links with Yoshio Kodama ===
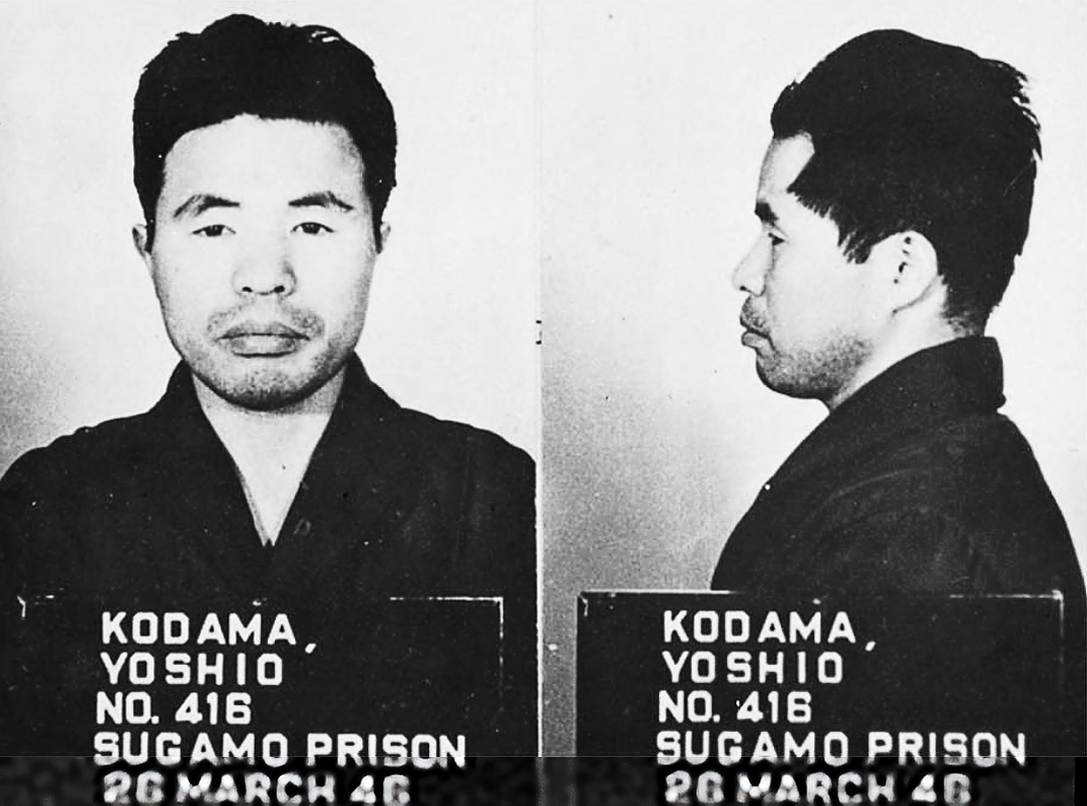
Kodama's mugshot during his imprisonment at Sugamo (1946)

Yoshio Kodama maintained a long running and extensive relationship with the Central Intelligence Agency and the Japanese right. Kodama first became relevant in an administrative role due to his established connections with the Imperial Japanese Navy High Command. His past, prior to his position as head of the Kodama kikan, consisted of multiple arrests and imprisonments and his founding of the Tengyo Society. The society was ostensibly an ultranationalist body which reportedly plotted to assassinate politicians whom Kodama viewed as too moderate. Kodama traveled to Shanghai, where he established the Kodama kikan, a body designed to supply resources to the Imperial Japanese Navy Air Service. As head of the Kodama kikan, Kodama's forces engaged in a campaign of extrajudicial requisitioning and extortion, forcing Chinese and Manchurian peasants to sell metals at gunpoint. The Kodama kikan grew to own multiple salt, iron and molybdenum mines, with Kodama establishing multiple factories and other industries to sustain his operations. Kodama also ran an opium ring out of his organizational center in Shanghai. Kodama's efforts earned him a fortune of over 175 million dollars' worth of diamonds, platinum and banknotes, and earned him a position as a financier for the Kempeitai in Shanghai and operations director of the intelligence office in the city. (Note: There is dispute over the total loot haul Kodama amassed in his Agency's operations in China. Seagrave 2003 (pp 108) states that Kodama amassed roughly 13 billion dollars in war loot, whereas other contemporary sources put his haul at under 200 million.) The Japanese government condoned Kodama's activities, turning a blind eye to the manner of his procurement. When Japan was on the brink of surrender in the middle of 1945, Kodama transferred more than a thousand gold bars and other requisitioned assets to Japan. After Japan's surrender, he was arrested and imprisoned in Sugamo for one year as a Class A war crimes suspect. (Note: It is disputed whether Kodama spent 3 years in Sugamo Prison or if he was held in Sugamo for one year. Page 209 of Drea 2006 states that he was "arrested and held in Sugamo for one year", whereas Baerwald 1976 states that he was held in Sugamo for three years.)

When Kodama was imprisoned in Sugamo prison, he cultivated a friendship with his cellmate and future prime minister Nobusuke Kishi. Willoughby was in contact with Kodama during his imprisonment, persuading him to write his memoir I Was Defeated, published through a CIA proprietary. After serving a year in prison, US authorities decided to end legal proceedings against him, and subsequently released him in late 1948. His early release is attributed to the G-2's interest in him. It is speculated that Kodama struck a deal with intelligence officials in the G-2, who secured his release. US officials were allegedly interested in Kodama's immense wealth and his expansive intelligence network in China, which the G-2 viewed as a valuable asset, particularly for the upcoming Operation Takematsu. Seizo Arisue in particular, head of the Katoh agency, enlisted him in building an intelligence network in North Korea and Manchuria.

30,000 young men of various athletic organizations
and strongly opposed to the Zengakuren are
being issued arm bands for identification
and will, if required, assist police.

— Douglas MacArthur II, Cable to the State Department, June 1960

During the 1960 Anpo protests, caused by the attempted renegotiation of the 1951 US-Japan Security Treaty, Nobusuke Kishi ordered his friend Yoshio Kodama to put together a force of Yakuza to protect US president Dwight Eisenhower during his visit to Japan. Kodama, who managed the secretive M-fund, utilized its capital in the "mass mobilization" to pay for the required manpower. The State Department and US ambassador Douglas MacArthur II were actively involved in planning the "mass mobilization", as evidenced by MacArthur's cable to the Harry S Truman Building which detailed Kodama's plan to deploy tens of thousands of Yakuza on the street to "greet Eisenhower" during his planned visit. The LDP sent multiple emissaries to support the plan, meeting with the heads of the Kensei-kai, the Sumiyoshi-kai, and tekiya organizations. These were grouped under the All Japan Council of Patriotic Organizations (Zenai Kaigi), which was composed primarily of right wing veterans and gangsters. Despite the pressure and encouragement of MacArthur and the State Department to let the visit go ahead, Kishi ultimately decided to cancel the visit in order to avoid a repeat of the Hagerty Incident.

Though agency memos painted an unsavory picture of Kodama, lamenting his greed and lack of value as an intelligence asset, it is disputed whether Kodama continued operations with the CIA after 1953. (Note: Though Drea 2006 argues that Agency memos painted Kodama as an unsavory figure, causing the CIA to sever ties with the "greedy and unreliable" Kodama, multiple authors implicate Kodama in future CIA activities and maintain that he remained an agency asset up until the Lockheed Bribery Scandals in the Mid-1970s) Tad Szulc wrote in The New Republic in relation to the Lockheed scandal, that "Intelligence sources say that Kodama had a working relationship with the CIA from the time he was released from a Japanese prison in 1948", implying that he continued communication with the CIA and remained an agency asset. Nevertheless, Kodama continued using his political position and vast sums of capital as leverage in his role as fixer. His agency's stolen assets from China were liquified into funds, supporting the formation of the Liberal Party. Kodama's role as kuromaku (black curtain puller) gave him substantial influence in the LDP, which he used repeatedly to the agency's benefit by promoting figures who would be supportive of more extensive re-armament. This included Nobusuke Kishi, who he helped become the prime minister in 1957, and Bambuko Ono, who he helped become the secretary general of the LDP in 1963. By the 1970s, before the Lockheed Bribery Scandals, Kodama commanded the allegiance of a large swath of the Japanese political establishment, being the LDP's link to organized crime. According to historian Sterling Seagrave, Kodama remained on the CIA payroll until the presidency of Ronald Reagan and Kodama's death in 1984.

==== Role in the Lockheed bribery affair ====
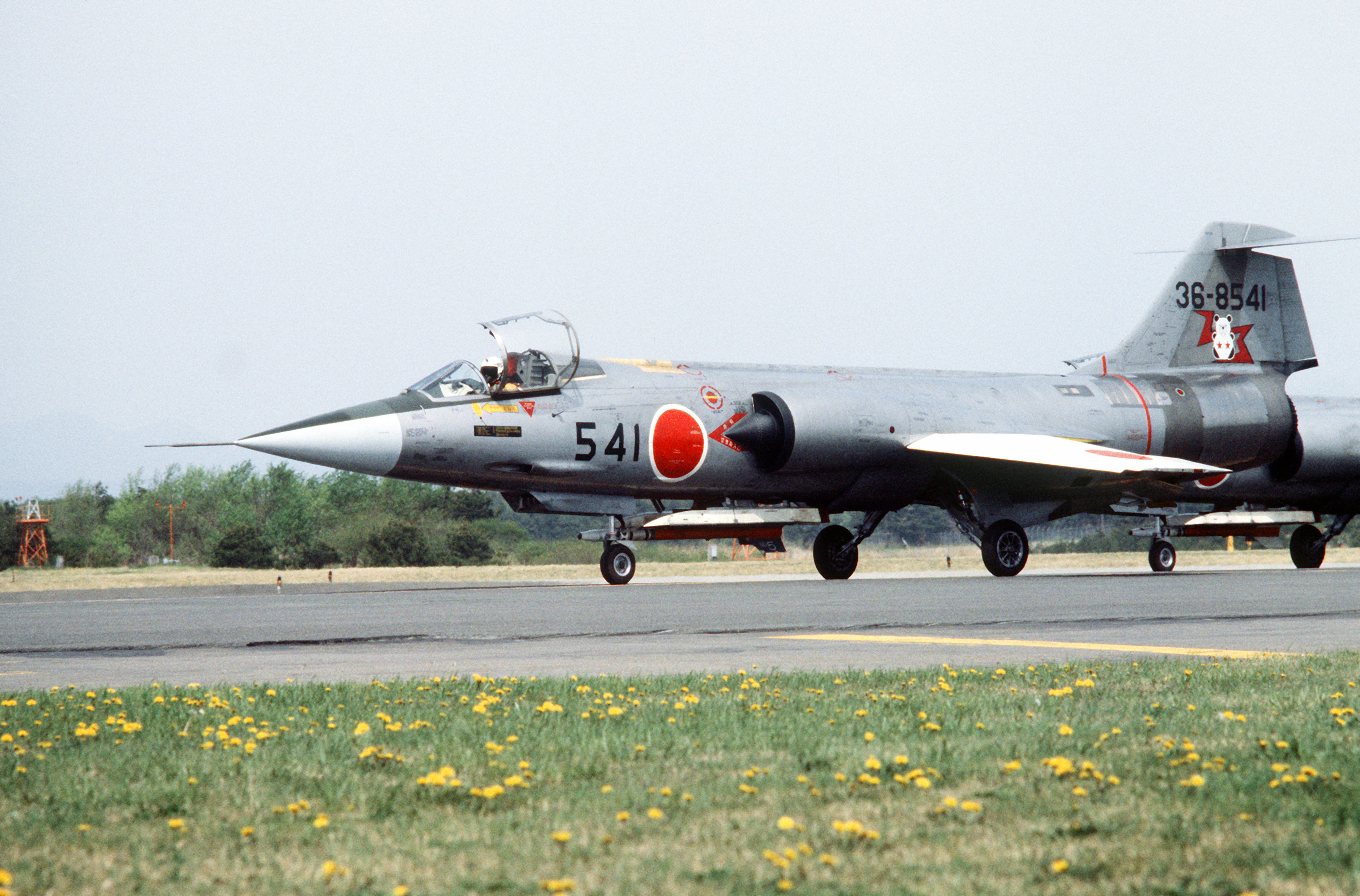
A Japanese Air Self-Defense Force F-104J

During the Lockheed Martin bribery scandal in the 1950s, the CIA is alleged to have actively participated in a cover-up operation by hiding the names of foreign officials and agency employees who had involvement with the bribes from the public. The CIA cited national security as a reason to not disclose the names of individuals involved, stating that disclosing the names of the persons involved would negatively impact foreign relations. The CIA also published a memorandum for press officials, instructing press officials to deny links between the CIA and Deak and Company, the conduit used by Lockheed Martin to launder the bribe money. Nevertheless, the individual who is suspected to have been both the orchestrator and principal recipient of the bribe money, Yoshio Kodama, was described to be the "CIA's chief intelligence asset in Japan".

Multiple authors have alleged that the CIA knew of the payoffs as they maintained an active intelligence profile and links with Kodama during the scandal. The New Republic stated that 4.3 million dollars of the payment, which went unfacilitated through Deak & Co, was transferred via Kodama. Furthermore, it alleged that Kodama, who was a known agency contact, had a working relationship with the CIA during the time period of the scandal. Jerome Alan Cohen wrote that Lockheed had chosen to use Kodama as an intermediary because he had prominent contacts with leaders of the Liberal Democratic Party. Yoshio Kodama was a paid consultant for Lockheed Martin for 15 years prior to the scandal, receiving 7 million dollars from Lockheed for his consulting services. For his activities promoting Lockheed, he was paid 6 million dollars from Lockheed as part of a commission for selling 6 Lockheed L-1011 TriStar aircraft to All Nippon Airways.

Kodama's political contacts included Yasuhiro Nakasone, the secretary general of the government. Kodama also had connections with former prime minister Kakuei Tanaka, whom he assisted electorally in 1972. Kodama also had long documented ties with Nobusuke Kishi, with Kishi and Kodama being prison mates at Sugamo and Kishi repeatedly asking favors from Kodama. In addition with his political contacts, Kodama maintained a close association with Kichitaro Hagiwara, operator of a subsidiary of the Mitsui corporation. He also had an extensive relationship with the Japanese securities market, with a documented relationship with Minoru Segawa, chairman of the Nomura Securities Company and former chairman of the Tokyo Stock Exchange.

Kodama's activities were in conjunction with the shell corporation Deak & Company, which was also a primary launderer. Nicholas Deak, the owner of Deak & Co and an OSS operative, was known to have conducted CIA financial aid during Operation Ajax to the instigators of the 28 Mordad coup via Deak's Hong Kong office. Deak also reportedly committed wire fraud by promising investors that he had significant silver claim accounts in his institution, which supposedly did not exist. Other allegations involving Deak included laundering money, with the CIA's knowledge, to Richard Nixon's 1972 reelection campaign. In total, Deak & Co funnelled an estimated 8.3 million dollars' worth of bribes from Lockheed to Japanese officials during the affair.

== See also ==
- CIA activities by country

== Notes and references ==
=== Bibliography ===
==== Journals ====
- Finnegan, John (2011). "The Evolution of US Army HUMINT: Intelligence. Operations in the Korean War" (PDF). Nova Scotia Archives.
- Esselstrom, Erik (2015). "From Wartime Friend to Cold War Fiend: The Abduction of Kaji Wataru and U.S -Japan Relations at Occupation's End". Journal of Cold War Studies. 17 (3): 159–183. doi:10.1162/JCWS_a_00564. JSTOR 26926210. S2CID 57564015.
- Johnson, Chalmers (1995). "The 1955 System and the American Connection: A Bibliographic Introduction" (PDF). Japan Policy Research Institute.
- Johnson, Chalmers; Schlei, Nobert; Schaller, Michael (2000). "The CIA And Japanese Politics". Asian Perspective. 24 (4). Johns Hopkins University Press: 79–103. doi:10.1353/apr.2000.0005. JSTOR 42705308.
- Walsh, Brian (2008). "Japanese Foreign Ministry's Document Destruction Order of 7 August 1945". Journal of American-East Asian Relations.
- Morris-Suzuki, Tessa (October 12, 2014). "Democracy's Porous Borders: Espionage, Smuggling and the Making of Japan's Transwar Regime" (PDF). The Asian-Pacific Journal, Japan Focus.
- Williams, Brad (2019). "US Covert Action in Cold War Japan: The Politics of Cultivating Conservative Elites and its Consequences". Journal of Contemporary Asia. 48.
- Saunavaara, Juha (2011). "Triangle of Power, Relations between the Occupation Authorities, Conservative Politicians and Behind-the-Scenes Financiers in Postwar Japan". Electronic Journal of Contemporary Japanese Studies.
- Siniawer, Eiko (2012). "Befitting Bedfellows: Yakuza and the State in Modern Japan". Journal of Social History. 45 (3): 623–641. doi:10.1093/jsh/shr120. JSTOR 41678902.
- Gragert, Bruce (1997). "Yakuza: The Warlords of Japanese Organized Crime". Annual Survey of International & Comparative Law.
- Baerwald, Hans (1976). "Lockheed and Japanese Politics". Asian Survey. 16 (9): 817–829. doi:10.2307/2643243. JSTOR 2643243.
- Marshall, Jonathan (2011). "Opium, Tungsten, and the Search for National Security, 1940–52". Journal of Policy History. 3 (4): 89–116. doi:10.1017/S0898030600007442. S2CID 153986860.
- Guillain, Robert (1952). "The Resurgence of Military Elements in Japan". Pacific Affairs. 25 (3): 211–225. doi:10.2307/2752799. JSTOR 2752799.
- Morris-Suzuki, Tessa (2015). "The CIA and the Japanese Media: A Cautionary Tale". Pearls and Irritations.
- Williams, Brad (2013). "Explaining the Absence of a Japanese Central Intelligence Agency: Alliance Politics, Sectionalism, and Antimilitarism". Journal of East Asian Studies. 13 (1): 137–164. doi:10.1017/S1598240800008559. JSTOR 23419012. S2CID 143334474.
- Wampler, Robert (1997). "State Department Document Reveals 'secret Action Plan' to Influence 1965 Okinawan Elections". National Security Archive.
- AFSC, Organization (2016). "Ten Reasons to Oppose Henoko and Deepening Okinawan Militarization" (PDF). American Friends Service Committee.
- Mitchell, Jon (2018), CIA: How to shape Okinawan public opinion on the U.S. military presence, The Asia-Pacific Journal
- Schaller, Michael (1982). "Securing the Great Crescent: Occupied Japan and the Origins of Containment in Southeast Asia". The Journal of American History. 69 (2): 392–414. doi:10.2307/1893825. JSTOR 1893825.

==== Books ====
- Weiner, Tim (2007). Legacy of Ashes. Doubleday. ISBN 978-0-385-51445-3.
- Drea, Edward (2006). Researching Japanese War Crimes Records Introductory Essays. Nazi War Crimes and Japanese Imperial Government Records Interagency Working Group. ISBN 1-880875-28-4.
- Marks, John (1978). The Search for the "Manchurian Candidate", the CIA and Mind Control (PDF). Penguin Books. ISBN 07139-12790.
- Kaplan, David; Dubro, Alex (1986). Yakuza: Japan's Criminal Underworld. University of California Press. ISBN 9780520274907. JSTOR 10.1525/j.ctt1ppxb2.
- McNaughton, James (2006). "Nisei Linguistics, Japanese Americans in the Military Intelligence Service during World War II" (PDF). Department of the Army. Archived from the original (PDF) on October 11, 2010.
- Fukui, Haruhiro (1970). Party in Power: The Japanese Liberal-Democrats and Policy-Making. ANU Press. ISBN 0520329414.
- Glenn, Davis; Roberts, John (1996). Occupation Without Troops Wall Street's Half-Century Domination of Japanese Politics. Periplus Editions (HK) Limited. ISBN 4900737453.
- Dower, John (1988). Yoshida Shigeru and the Japanese Experience, 1878-1954. Harvard University Asia Center. ISBN 9781684172153.
- Matsumura, Takao; Benson, John (2001). Japan 1868-1945: From Isolation to Occupation. Taylor & Francis. ISBN 9781138176713.
- Seagrave, Sterling (2003). Gold Warriors: America's Secret Recovery of Yamashita's Gold. Verso Books. ISBN 9781859845424.
- Williams, Brad (2021). Japanese Foreign Intelligence and Grand Strategy: From the Cold War to the Abe Era. Georgetown University Press. ISBN 9781647120658.
- Ball, Desmond; Tanter, Richard (2015). US signals intelligence (SIGINT) activities in Japan 1945 – 2015: A Visual Guide (PDF). Nautilus Institute for Security and Sustainability.
- Kapur, Nick (2018). Japan at the Crossroads: Conflict and Compromise after Anpo. Harvard University Press. ISBN 9780674988484.

==== Documents ====
- CIA, FOIA (1953), Hattori, Takushiro Vol. 1 (PDF)
- CIA, FOIA (July 21, 1955), CIA Memorandum – Shoriki, Matsutaro Vol. 2 (PDF)
- CIA, FOIA (2005), Possible Questions and Proposed Answers to Allegations of the CIA Involvement in the Lockheed Affair (PDF)
- CIA, FOIA (2002), Description of Newly Discovered Project ARTICHOKE/BLUEBIRD Materials (PDF)
- CIA, FOIA (1956), Kaya Okinori Vol. 15
- CIA, FOIA (1958), Shoriki, Matsutaro Vol. 3_0051 (PDF)

==== News articles ====
- "Navy orders to destroy papers found", The Japan Times, Kyodo News, April 5, 2008
- Editorial Board (July 11, 1960), "My Recollection As an Agent of the Canon Organ by Han To-Pong" (PDF), Shukan Shincho
- Whiting, Robert (August 18, 2020), "Inside story of US black ops in post-war Japan", Asia Times (published August 19, 2020)
- Editorial Board (December 12, 1952), "U. S. Investigating Detention in Japan", The New York Times
- Anderson, Jack (June 11, 1986), "US Blamed in Rise of Japanese Gangs", The Washington Post
- Cohen, Jerome (March 29, 1976), "Lockheed Cover Up?", The New York Times
- Szulc, Tad (April 10, 1976), Curious Customers of Deak & Co. – The Money Changer (PDF), The New Republic
- Anderson, Jack; Whitten, Les (1976), "CIA Knew of Multinational Payoffs", The Washington Post
- Horvat, Andrew (June 3, 1977), "Tokyo Agent Says Lockheed Paid Him", The Washington Post
- Halloran, Richard (May 11, 1976), "Lockheed Agent had Contacts Among Top Japanese", The New York Times
- Editorial Board (2005), Clever Nick (PDF), Central Intelligence Agency Freedom of Information Act Reading Room
- Weiner, Tim (October 9, 1994), "C.I.A. Spent Millions to Support Japanese Right in 50's and 60's", The New York Times
- NPS, Catocin Mountain Park (2007), OSS in Action The Pacific and the Far East, National Park Service
- Saxon, Wolfgang (1984), "Yoshio Kodama; Was Rightist", The New York Times
- Editorial Board (1995), "World News Briefs; C.I.A. Blocks Release Of Documents on Japan", The New York Times
- Halloran, Richard (July 2, 1974), "Little-Known Japanese Wield Vast Power", The New York Times
- Coleman, Joseph (2007), Records reveal U.S.-linked coup plan in '50s Japan, Associated Press
- Kyodo, News Board (2006), "U.S. admits CIA gave LDP money in 1950s, 1960s", The Japan Times, archived from the original on April 6, 2020

== Further reading and research ==
- Schonberger, Howard (1988). "A Rejoinder". Pacific Historical Review. 57 (2): 209–218. doi:10.2307/4492267. JSTOR 4492267. Journal about the Japan lobby's influence in shaping the Reverse Course
- Hofmann, Reto (2019). "The conservative imaginary: moral re-armament and the internationalism of the Japanese right, 1945–1962". Japan Forum. About the LDP's participation in the Moral Re-Armament organization.
- Adelstein, Jake (2009). Tokyo Vice: An American Reporter on the Police Beat in Japan. Pantheon Books. ISBN 978-0-307-37879-8. Contains information on CIA links with the Yakuza
- Whiting, Robert (2000). Tokyo Underworld: The Fast Times and Hard Life of an American Gangster in Japan. Vintage Books. ISBN 0375724893. Contains information on CIA links with the Yakuza
- CIA, FOIA (September 18, 1951), Kodama, Yoshio Vol. 1 (PDF) CIA Profile on Kodama
- CIA, FOIA (October 18, 1963), Kodama, Yoshio Vol. 1_0002 (PDF) CIA document describing Kodama's activities in Pre War and Post War Japan
- Kodama, Yoshio, Showa Trading Co. (Sponsored by the Japanese Army) and Banwa Kikan (Sponsored by the Japanese Navy), University of Virginia Law Library, 1947 Documents describing the organization of the Kodama kikan
