= Hugh Heclo =

Hugh Heclo (10 March 1943 – 6 August 2017) was born in Marion, Ohio. After receiving a Bachelor of Art's degree from George Washington University in 1965, he went on to receive an M.A. from Manchester University in 1967, and a Ph.D. from Yale University in 1970. Heclo was a Clarence J. Robinson Professor of Public Affairs at George Mason University, in the United States from 1987 until retirement in 2014. He was previously a professor of government at Harvard University and George Washington University in the 1980s. He operated Ashcroft Farms, a Christmas tree farm outside Winchester, Virginia.

Heclo is perhaps best known as an expert on American democratic institutions and the development of modern welfare states. In 1978, he invented the concept of an issue network, used to describe loose alliances between interest groups, organizations, and economic actors that attempt to influence policy development. Issue Crawler, a server-side software that locates public debate on the Web, is based on the issue network concept.

In addition to his many academic accomplishments, Heclo received many awards and accolades, including the American Political Science Association's John Gaus Award, recognizing and honoring exemplary scholarship in the joint tradition of political science and public administration. Heclo was also the recipient of the Guggenheim Fellowship and served the Library of Congress' Kluge Center from 1985-1986 and served the White House as Senior Fellow at the Brookings Institution.

A collection of Heclo’s donated materials is housed at the George Mason University Special Collections Research Center.

== List of works ==
- 1974 Modern Social Politics in Britain and Sweden
- 1975 Comparative Public Policy
- 1977 A Government of Strangers: Executive Politics in Washington
- 1998 The Government We Deserve
- 2003 Religion Returns to the Public Square (contributor and editor)
- 2003 Chapter in The Reagan Presidency
- 2003 Chapter in The George W. Bush Presidency: An Early Assessment
- 2008 On Thinking Institutionally
