= David Judge =

David Judge may refer to:

- David Judge (actor) (born 1983), English actor
- David Judge (field hockey) (1936–2015), Irish field hockey international
- David Judge (political scientist) (1950–2026), British political scientist and writer
