= Asia First =

US foreign policy strategy

The Asia First strategy was pushed for in the early 1950s by the powerful China Lobby of the Republican Party in the United States.

The Asia First strategy called for the future concentration of American resources in the Far East, in a similar way to the Marshall Plan and the Truman Doctrine in Europe, to fight against the encroaching spread of Soviet communism.

The policy was suggested in a period of great anxiety in the US as Cold War tensions were heightened following the Korean War (1950–53) and the 1949 communist takeover in the Republic of China after the Chinese Civil War. These tensions put great pressure on President Truman to adopt this policy, but ultimately he rejected it fearing that it would pin the US down in the Far East dealing with a secondary enemy, the People's Republic of China, while his real concern, the Soviet Union, would have a free hand in Europe.

Truman, however, made some attempts to strengthen the American position in the Far East but not at the expense of Europe. In 1950, the US promised military assistance to the French in the struggle against the Viet Minh in the First Indochina War. Pressured by the Japan lobby, the US ended its purge policy against suspected war criminals and terminated its program to break up Japanese industrial conglomerates, in a policy shift known as the reverse course. In addition, in 1951, the United States signed a Security Treaty with Japan allowing US troops to remain stationed at Okinawa and tying Japan to the US. Also in the period 1950–51, US reinforcements were sent to South Korea to strengthen the US military position there. In this period the US navy was also steamed into the Taiwan Strait as a deterrent to prevent conflict between the Republic of China who had retreated to the island of Taiwan and the Chinese communists in mainland China.

== See also ==
- China lobby
- Europe first
- Island Chain Strategy
