= Policy network analysis =

Research method in political science

Policy network analysis is a field of research in political science focusing on the links and interdependence between government's sections and other societal actors, aiming to understand the policy-making process and public policy outcomes.

== Definition of policy networks ==
Although the number of definitions is almost as large as the number of approaches of analysis, Rhodes aims to offer a minimally exclusive starting point: "Policy networks are sets of formal institutional and informal linkages between governmental and other actors structured around shared if endlessly negotiated beliefs and interests in public policy making and implementation."

== Possible typologies of policy networks ==
As Thatcher notes, policy network approaches initially aimed to model specific forms of state-interest group relations, without giving exhaustive typologies.

=== Policy communities vs. Issue networks ===
The most widely used paradigm of the 1970s and 1980s only analyzed two specific types of policy networks: policy communities and issue networks. Justifications of the usage of these concepts were deduced from empirical case studies.

Policy Communities in which you refer to relatively slowly changing networks defining the context of policy-making in specific policy segments. The network links are generally perceived as the relational ties between bureaucrats, politicians and interest groups. The main characteristic of policy communities – compared to issue networks – is that the boundaries of the networks are more stable and more clearly defined. This concept was studied in the context of policy-making in the United Kingdom.

In contrast, issue networks – a concept established in literature about United States government – refer to a looser system, where a relatively large number of stakeholders are involved. Non-government actors in these networks usually include not only interest group representatives but also professional or academic experts. An important characteristic of issue networks is that membership is constantly changing, interdependence is often asymmetric and – compared to policy communities – it is harder to identify dominant actors.

=== Other possible typologies ===
New typological approaches appeared in the early 1990s and late 1980s with the aim of grouping policy networks into a system of mutually exclusive and commonly exhaustive categories. One possible logic of typology is based on the degree of integration, membership size and distribution of resources in the network. This categorization – perhaps most importantly represented by R. A. W. Rhodes – allows the combination of policy communities and issue networks with categories like professional network, intragovernmental network and producer network. Other approaches identify categories based on distinct patterns of state-interest group relations. Patterns include corporatism and pluralism, iron triangles, subgovernment and clientelism while the differentiation is based on membership, stability and sectorality.

== Roles of policy network analysis ==
As the field of policy network analysis grew since the late 20th century, scholars developed competing descriptive, theoretical and prescriptive accounts. Each type gives different specific content for the term policy network and uses different research methodologies.

=== Descriptive usage ===
For several authors, policy networks describe specific forms of government policy-making. The three most important forms are interest intermediation, interorganizational analysis, and governance.

==== Interest intermediation ====
An approach developed from the literature on US pluralism, policy networks are often analyzed in order to identify the most important actors influencing governmental decision-making. From this perspective, a network-based assessment is useful to describe power positions, the structure of oligopoly in political markets, and the institutions of interest negotiation.

==== Interorganizational analysis ====
Another branch of descriptive literature, which emerged from the study of European politics, aims to understand the interdependency in decision-making between formal political institutions and the corresponding organizational structures. This viewpoint emphasizes the importance of overlapping organizational responsibilities and the distribution of power in shaping specific policy outcomes.

==== Governance ====
A third direction of descriptive scholarship is to describe general patterns of policy-making – the formal institutions of power-sharing between government, independent state bodies and the representatives of employer and labor interests.

=== Theoretical usage ===
The two most important theoretical approaches aiming to understand and explain actor's behavior in policy networks are the following: power dependence and rational choice.

==== Power dependence ====
In power dependence models, policy networks are understood as mechanism of exchanging resources between organizations in the networks. The dynamic of exchange is determined by the comparative value of resources (f.e. legal, political or financial in nature) and individual capacities to deploy them in order create better bargaining positions and achieve higher degrees of autonomy.

==== Rational choice ====
In policy network analysis, theorists complement standard rational choice arguments with the insights of new institutionalism. This "actor-centered institutionalism" is used to describe policy networks as structural arrangements between relatively stable sets of public and private players. Rational choice theorists identify links between network actors as channels to exchange multiple goods (f.e. knowledge, resources and information).

=== Prescriptive usage ===
The prescriptive literature on policy networks focuses on the phenomenon's role in constraining or enabling certain governmental action. From this viewpoint, networks are seen as central elements of the realm of policy-making at least partially defining the desirability of status quo – thus a possible target of reform initiatives. The three most common network management approaches are the following: instrumental (a focus on altering dependency relation), institutional (a focus on rules, incentives and culture) and interactive (a focus on communication and negotiation).

== New directions and debates ==
As Rhodes points out, there is a long-lasting debate in the field about general theories predicting the emergence of specific networks and corresponding policy outcomes depending on specific conditions. No theories have succeeded in achieving this level of generality yet and some scholars doubt they ever will. Other debates are focusing on describing and theorizing change in policy networks. While some political scientists state that this might not be possible, other scholars have made efforts towards the understanding of policy network dynamics. One example is the advocacy coalition framework, which aims to analyze the effect of commonly represented beliefs (in coalitions) on policy outcomes.

== See also ==
- Advocacy group
- Issue networks
- Network science
- Political science
- Political economy
- Rational choice model
