= Local service delivery =

Local service delivery is the delivery of public services at the local level and is a distinct domain of public policy. Local governments can be more reflective of local needs and interests and a prime driver of innovation in government practices; at the same time, local service delivery deals with some challenges, such as expertise concerns, steering problems, and the presence of economies of scale. Local service delivery was a key topic of discussion for academics and practitioners after the decentralization and corporatization that occurred under New Public Management and austerity after the 2008 financial crisis.

== Types ==
Local service delivery can take place in many ways. Local services can be delivered directly by the municipality’s bureaucracy, by municipal corporations, by public-private partnerships, by inter-municipal cooperation, and by private organizations through contracting or privatization. Since switching between the multiple options of service delivery often incurs costs, there is often high path dependency in local service delivery that makes it difficult to easily adjust policy choices to changed political and economic environments.

== Benefits ==
=== Democracy and localized government ===
While local government is not a necessary part of modern government, it is often an integral part. Local government is closer to the citizens than higher layers of government and can be more reflective of local needs and interests.

=== Innovative government ===
Local government can be a driver of innovative government. Due to the frequent presence of competition between local governments and their sheer numbers, there is much diversity in local service delivery. The presence of networks allows limited policy learning between local governments, and so innovative ideas can spread and eventually make their way into other levels of government.

== Concerns ==
=== Expertise concerns and steering problems ===
Local service delivery involves expertise concerns. Since it is (due to geographic size) less likely that local governments possess certain types of expertise than higher layers of government, they are more dependent on outside actors for service delivery, and yet less capable of monitoring them. Such steering issues are a source of inefficiency for local service delivery.

=== Scale economies and collective action ===
It is often the case that service delivery gets costlier as the population gets smaller, since there are high fixed costs of public policy. Thus, cooperation is a central theme in local government for many services.

== Examples of local services ==
Examples of local services include:

- Recreation and sports facilities
- Economic development initiatives
- Culture and science facilities
- Parks, landscaping, and building maintenance
- Environment, water supply, and solid waste management
- Parking, transportation, and communications services
- Social housing
- Urban policy and land use management
- Energy services
- Municipal police
