= Global public policy networks =

Global public policy networks (GPPNs) are non-state entities that bring together actors from various sectors including governments, international organizations, civil society and business to address global issues. They may be legally incorporated or may operate more informally however they aim to take on an international role, even without the formal status of an international or multilateral organization/institution. These networks are comprised by actors in many sectors and levels including civil society, government and government agencies, industry and business, research and education and multilateral organizations and institutions. Global public policy network activities cover the range of steps in the policy process, beyond policy proposals or lobbying, including agenda setting, policy formulation, negotiation, rule making, coordination, implementation and evaluation. Their expertise can often play an important role in global debates and norm establishment.

GPPN emerged as a term in the early 2000s and there are many similar concepts . The basis for scholarship on GPPNs can be seen to be set by Robert Keohane and Joseph Nye, as well as Anne-Marie Slaughter in the United States. While their status and role in the development of norms in the transnational sphere can be understood through work on "hard" and "soft" law including Kenneth W. Abbott, and Jon Birger Skjærseth. Further scholarship on their role in global governance includes work by Diane Stone who also refers to policy transfer, global knowledge networks and transnational advocacy networks.

== Example ==
Examples of GPPNs include: The World Commission on Dams, the International Competition Network, the Global Water Partnership, the Medicines for Malaria Venture (which has since become a foundation), the Internet & Jurisdiction Policy Network, and REN21.

== See also ==
- Issue network
- Policy network (in German)
- Policy transfer
- Think tank
