= David Marsh (political scientist) =

British political scientist

- Born: 27 June 1946 (age 80)

Philosophical work
- Institutions: the Australian National University's (ANU) College of Arts and Social Sciences Professor of Political Sociology and Head of the Department of Sociology, University of Birmingham
- Main interests: Political science

David Marsh (born 27 June 1946), is a British political scientist. He is currently Professor of Political Sociology and the Head of the Department of Sociology at the University of Birmingham and Fellow at the Institute of Governance and Policy Analysis (IGPA).

== Early career ==
He was previously Director of the Research School of Social Sciences at ANU. Prior to this he was Professor of Political Sociology at the University of Birmingham, and also worked at the University of Strathclyde and the University of Essex.

== Research interests ==
Marsh's research focuses on issues of political participation, governance and policy transfer.

== Publications ==
His publications include Theory and Methods in Political Science (co-edited with Gerry Stoker, Palgrave Macmillan, 1995/2002/2010), Demystifying Globalization (co-edited with Colin Hay, Macmillan/St Martin's Press, 2000) and The New Politics of British Trade Unionism: Union Power and the Thatcher Legacy (Macmillan, 1992). He is co-editor of the journal British Politics and has published over 90 articles and book chapters during his career.
