= Gerry Stoker =

British political scientist

- Born: 4 February 1955 (age 71)

Philosophical work
- Institutions: University of Southampton
- Main interests: Political science

Gerry Stoker (born 4 February 1955), is a British political scientist noted for his works on local government and his textbooks. He is also a lecturer at the University of Southampton.

== Biography ==
Stoker has provided advice to various parts of UK government, and is also an expert advisor to the Council of Europe on local government and participation issues. Over the previous 5 years, he has received invitations to speak at conferences on governance issues aimed at practitioners and policymakers as well as academics from the US, Japan, China, Italy, Korea Norway, Ireland, Germany, Spain, Portugal, Denmark and Australia. In particular, he was a keynote speaker at the United Nations' 6th Reinventing Government Global Forum, Korea in 2005. In 2004, he won the Political Studies Association Award for 'making a difference' in recognition of the impact of his work on governance issues.

Gerry Stoker is Professor of Politics and Governance at the University of Southampton, UK. He has authored or edited over 20 books and published over 70 refereed articles or chapters in books. His work has been translated into French, Spanish, Italian, Polish, Hebrew, Portuguese and Chinese. His most recent book Why Politics Matters won the 2006 political book of the year award from the Political Studies Association of the UK.

His current research deals with issues of governance in complex settings, political disenchantment in western democracies, citizen empowerment and strategies for encouraging civic behaviour among citizens. In his research work Professor Stoker is committed to the use of pioneering methods and in particular to approaches that enable evidenced-based policy and practice. In recent work he has promoted the use of randomized control trials, design experiments and Boolean techniques to draw out lessons from multiple case studies. Professor Stoker was the founding Chair of the New Local Government Network (www.nlgn.org.uk) that was the think tank of the year in the UK in 2004.

He has acted as an advisor to the UK government and the Council of Europe on local government issues over the last decade and more.

== Selected bibliography ==
=== Books ===
- Stoker, Gerry (1988). The politics of local government. Basingstoke, England: Macmillan Education. ISBN 9780333442692.
- Stoker, Gerry; Batley, Richard (1991). Local government in Europe: trends and developments. Basingstoke, England: Macmillan Education. ISBN 9780333554807.
- Stoker, Gerry; Lorrain, Dominique (1995). La privatisation des services urbains en Europe. Paris: La Découverte. ISBN 9782707124319.
- Stoker, Gerry; Judge, David; Wolman, Harold (1995). Theories of urban politics. London Thousand Oaks, California: Sage Publications. ISBN 9780803988651.
- Stoker, Gerry; King, Desmond (1996). Rethinking local democracy. Basingstoke, England: Macmillan In association with the Economic & Social Research Council Local Programme. ISBN 9780333638538.
- Stoker, Gerry (2000). The new politics of British local governance. New York: St. Martin's Press. ISBN 9780333728185.
- Stoker, Gerry (2006). Why politics matters: making democracy work. Houndmills England New York: Palgrave Macmillan. ISBN 9781403997401.
- Stoker, Gerry; Chhotray, Vasudha (2009). Governance theory and practice a cross-disciplinary approach. Basingstoke, England New York: Palgrave Macmillan. ISBN 9780230250390.
- Stoker, Gerry; Marsh, David (2010). Theory and methods in political science (3rd ed.). Basingstoke, England: Palgrave Macmillan. ISBN 9780230576278.
- Stoker, Gerry; et al. (2011). Prospects for citizenship. London: Bloomsbury Academic. ISBN 9781283195058.
- Stoker, Gerry; Pierre, Jon; Peters, B. Guy (2013). Debating institutionalism. Manchester, England: Manchester University Press. ISBN 9780719090004.
- Stoker, Gerry; John, Peter; et al. (2013). Nudge, nudge, think, think: experimenting with ways to change civic behaviour. London: Bloomsbury Academic. ISBN 9781780935553.

==== Forthcoming ====
- Stoker, Gerry; Kippin, Henry; Griffiths, Simon (2015). Public services: a new reform agenda. London New York: Bloomsbury. ISBN 9781474218054.
- Stoker, Gerry; Pierre, Jon; Peters, B. Guy (2015). The relevance of political science. Political Analysis. Basingstoke, England: Palgrave Macmillan. ISBN 9780230201095.
