= China lobby in the United States =

Unofficial lobby of the Republic of China in the United States

In American politics, the China lobby (Chinese: 中國遊說團; pinyin: Zhōngguó yóushuì tuán; Wade–Giles: Chung^{1}-kuo^{2} yu^{2}-shui^{4} t'uan^{2}) consisted of an informal network of advocacy groups, politicians, journalists, Protestant missions in China, Chinese diplomats, and Chinese Americans that advocated for the United States to support the Republic of China, governed by the Kuomintang. During the Cold War, the support also included opposition to the People's Republic of China, ruled by the Chinese Communist Party.

== History ==
=== The Cold War ===
The Committee of One Million Against the Admission of Red China to the United Nations, later changed its name to The Committee of One Million Against the Admission of Communist China to the United Nations. The committee was established by Marvin Liebman, a political activist. Congressman Walter Judd (1898–1994) was an important spokesman for the Lobby.

It was the dominant lobby on China issues until the 1970s. During the 1970s, the China Lobby strongly opposed American recognition of the People's Republic of China (PRC). However in the 1970s, China–United States relations improved as US President Richard Nixon pursued normalized relations and the United States recognized the PRC as "China" in 1979.

== See also ==
- Asia first
- China Hands
- Committee of 100 (United States)
- Blue Team (U.S. politics)
- National Committee on United States–China Relations
