= Policy learning =

Learning from policy problems and solutions often across different contexts

Policy learning is the increased understanding that occurs when policymakers compare one set of policy problems to others within their own or in other jurisdictions. It can aid in understanding why a policy was implemented, the policy's effects, and how the policy could apply to the policymakers' jurisdiction. Before a policy is adopted it goes through a process that involves various combinations of elected official(s), political parties, civil servants, advocacy groups, policy experts or consultants, corporations, think tanks, and multiple levels of government. Policy can be challenged in various ways, including questioning its legality. Ideally, policymakers develop complete knowledge about the policy; the policy should achieve its intent and efficiently use resources.

Policy learning through globalization has helped government organizations become more competitive. Policymakers have easy access to global policy knowledge through the internet, access to think tanks, international institutions such as the United Nations, International Monetary Fund (IMF) or the World Bank and individual experts.

== How policymakers learn ==
In the 1960s academics started to study how policymakers learn about policies. During that time countries were experiencing social, political, economic and technological change. Researchers discovered that governments in different countries faced similar problems in policies and programs amidst uncertainty on how to handle problems in financing its welfare programs. Policymakers start to learn about policy through facts, first-hand experiences or from the experiences of others.

Policy instruments and policy implementation are the steps to policy learning. Policymakers review policy objectives, tools and implementation strategies. When implementations fail, reviews look for the cause(s). Adjustments in objectives, tools and implementation are considered.

== Instrumental policy learning ==
Instrumental policy learning is the acquisition of knowledge about the effectiveness of various policy instruments and implementations. Policymakers must make choices about the appropriate policy intervention tool(s) to use. The intent is to discover the most effective tool(s) that consume the least resources.

Policymakers can employ seven major policy instrument types.

- Direct provision–services that governments provide directly, such as publicly operated schools
- Subsidies–cash infusions given by government to reduce the cost for the producer or consumer, such as dairy farmers who receive subsidies to keep consumer costs low.
- Taxation–collection of money from individuals and/or businesses, such as a value-added tax.
- Contract–an agreement between a government and a private entity to provide goods or services.
- Authority–government action implementing legislation with accompanying enforcement.
- Regulation–government action driven by administrative action rather than legislation, governing domains such as the environment and public health. (Some private groups regulate themselves independent of the government.)
- Exhortation–encouragement without coercion, such as campaigns against littering or encouraging fire prevention.

After choosing a policy instrument, the details for employing the instrument must be arranged. Implementation carries risks of failing in various ways, such as ineffectiveness, unacceptable delays and excessive costs. Practices that improve success rates include setting reasonable expectations, allowing adequate time and sufficient resources, having clear communication and understanding policy objectives, minimizing the number of approvals, simplifying management structures and aligning all relevant groups around the implementation, along with mechanisms to adapt the implementation in accord with subsequent experience to correct problems and take advantage of new opportunities.

=== Top-down approach ===
The top-down approach involves allowing high-level policymakers set objectives and define implementation strategies. Lower level implementers carry out the policy. Objectives must be clearly defined and the implementation tools must be selected based on the implementation strategy. Policy designers need to assess the commitment of policy implementers who could be teachers, police officers, social workers or private sector workers.

One example of the top-down approach was in 1973 when the US Congress passed a policy limiting the driving speed to 55 mph on America’s freeways under the National Maximum Speed Law. The policy objective was to reduce gasoline consumption. In addition to increased travel times, a side effect was the reduction of freeway fatalities.

=== Bottom-up approach ===
The bottom-up approach helps policymakers to evaluate whether policy goals are open to more than one interpretation. Does the policy implement a statute, or reflect rules, practices and/or norms such as energy policy or criminal procedure? Are the policy goals internally consistent? How will the policy affect the activities of workers who directly provide services? Bottom-up approaches require policymakers to involve both service providers and service recipients in refining goals, strategies and activities. This bottom-up approach starts from consumer-facing bureaucrats and moves up to the top policymakers. Should the policy face pushback, policymakers must be open to negotiations for a compromise approach. The bottom-up approach emphasizes low level policy implementers, but policy learners must not attempt to frustrate the goals of top policymakers.

In America, the No Child Left Behind Act (NCLB) adopted policies that would have benefited from bottom-up perspectives. When NCLB was passed, many states struggled to figure out what was required. All states had to get their education plans approved by U.S. Department of Education. Once the education plan was approved, each state had to incorporate NCLB into the state's framework of educational governance and to use the legislation to achieve the state's own goals. If the U.S. federal government had consulted with each state about its education policies, performances, and future goals, teachers and the government would have had a better understanding on what policy objectives were achievable.

== Challenges ==
Policy learning has not been embraced in some countries. Some countries that were once colonized fear that embracing policies recommended by outsiders will allow other countries to exploit their resources. Rockefeller (1966) claimed that in Latin America in the early 1960s free-market policies were in competition with communist propaganda in Latin American countries. At the time American business were claimed to be exploiting the people and their resources. However, companies such as Chase Manhattan Bank launched a program in Panama to improve cattle raising by training ranchers to follow the scientific advances of seeding, feeding and breeding cattle more effectively. This process improved the quality of beef, which encouraged higher meat consumption, improved dietary standards and made Panama a beef exporter.

European countries created the Euro to simplify trading between European Union countries. Adopting the Euro would remove currency risk and the cost of currency conversion, and provide a common monetary policy among members. Policy learning took places as more European countries learned that joining the Eurozone would give them access to other markets. Citizens of EU member countries could travel to other EU countries within the Schengen area without transiting a border checkpoint. The learning did not reach all policy sectors. Some EU countries kept their budgets in near balance amid strong growth and employment, while others' budgets were so far out of balance that their overall debt created fears about their ability to make their payments.

== See also ==
- Policy transfer
