= Issue network =

Alliances of interest groups and individuals promoting a common cause

Issue networks are an alliance of various interest groups and individuals who unite in order to promote a common cause or agenda in a way that influences government policy. Issue networks can be either domestic or international in scope depending on their collective goal. With the rise of the internet, many interest groups have turned to online resources, such as blogs and social media, to promote and spread their cause because of its low cost and high efficiency in outreach. An issue network's tactics vary depending on their goals and purpose. In developed countries, issue networks often push for a change in policy within the government bureaucracy. An example includes the wide-ranging network of environmental groups and individuals who push for more environmental regulation in government policy. Other issue networks may revolve around such controversial issues as abortion, gun ownership rights, and drug laws. In the most extreme circumstances, issue networks may seek to achieve their means through violence, such as terrorist organizations looking to overthrow existing governments altogether. In the U.S., the most common tactic of effective issue networks is the role they play in what is called Iron Triangles. This is the three-way back-and-forth communication process between Congress, Bureaucracies, and the interest groups that make up an issue network where they discuss policy and agendas in order to compromise on solutions to satisfy each other's agendas.

== Types of issue networks ==
In this table, subjects are categorized from high to low complexity and salience. Salience, meaning how high something affects a large number of people, and complexity meaning how much training and knowledge is needed for someone to answer the questions that can be asked about the subject. The typography below is by William T. Gormley

Salience	Complexity		
Salience	High	Low	High
Salience	High	Zoning Regulation	Nuclear Licensing
Salience	High	Affirmative Action Regulation	Electric Utility Regulation
Salience	High	Minimum Wage Regulation	Gas Utility Regulation
Salience	High	Gun Control	Hazardous Waste Regulation
Salience	High	Sale of Pornography	Water Quality Regulation
Salience	High	Nude Dancing	Occupational Safety
Salience	High	Video Arcade	Health Regulation
Salience	High	Hiring of Illegals	Drug Licensing
Salience	High	Truth-in-Labeling	Power Plant Siting
Salience	High	Fair Advertising	Strip Mining Regulation
Salience	High	Fair Advertising	Generic Research
Salience	Low	Building Inspections	Cable Television Regulations
Salience	Low	Housing Inspections	Antitrust Regulation
Salience	Low	Nursing Home Inspections	Securities Regulations
Salience	Low	Liquor Licensing	Insurance Regulation
Salience	Low	Blue Laws	Banking Regulation
Salience	Low	Billboard Regulations	Telephone Regulation
Salience	Low	Restaurant Inspections	Transportation Regulation
Salience	Low	Election Regulation	Hospital Rate Regulation
Salience	Low	Motor Vehicle Inspections	Patent Regulation
Salience	Low	Broadcast Regulation	Patent Regulation

== Iron triangles versus issue networks ==
Issue networks may be confused with the related concept of Iron triangles, but have several key differences. One of these is that issue networks are generally free-forming groups of people in the public sector who form a coalition together, not through a congressional committee, or a federal agency but are bound together to work on a current issue. Therefore, issue networks are often temporary, breaking up when their goals are accomplished, unlike iron triangles. Another difference between iron triangles and issue networks is that issue networks can oppose each other. For instance, an issue network based around supporting the construction of a pipeline can cause another issue network to form that opposes it. The members of an issue network may support or oppose it for various reasons, but what brings them together is their shared opinions.

== Other countries ==
From a stable policy community, through a period of substantial change under firm government control, to a densely populated and competitive environment composed of issue networks. In countries such as Australia and the United Kingdom, government is returning to a more interactive strategy regarding issue networks. In other countries, group input is a vital component of the policy-making process, through that process bureaucratic expertise is built-up and maintained. The existence of knowledgeable government agencies is necessary to balance the demands of competing groups and thereby ensure greater stability of policy outcomes. For example, in Australia, higher education is a good example of how the government is listening to clientele groups (issue networks) less than they were in the past due to the complexity of universities and the higher education system.

== See also ==
- Interest group
- Iron triangle (US politics)#Cultivation of a constituency
- Global public policy networks
- Policy network analysis
- Policy network (in German)
- Multistakeholder governance model

== Notes ==
- Marc Landy and Sidney M. Milkis. American Government: Balancing Democracy and Rights. New York: McGraw-Hill, 2004.
- Milton C. Cummings Jr. and David Wise. Democracy Under Pressure: An Introduction to the American Political System, Tenth Edition. Thompson- Wadsworth, 2005
- Christine Barbour and Gerald C Wright. the Republic, Power and Citizenship in American Politics., Indiana University, 2009.
