= David Judge (political scientist) =

British political scientist and writer (1950–2026)

- Born: 22 May 1950; Sheffield, England
- Died: February 2026 (aged 75)

Philosophical work
- Institutions: University of Strathclyde
- Main interests: Political science

David Judge (22 May 1950 – February 2026) was a British political scientist and writer based at the University of Strathclyde, where he was Emeritus Professor in the School of Government and Public Policy. His main research interests included legislative studies, United Kingdom political institutions, the European Parliament and representative democracy.

== Life and career ==
Judge was born in Sheffield, England on 22 May 1950. He was a visiting professor, College of Europe, Bruges (2004–2007), and University of Houston (1993–1994). He died from oesophageal cancer in February 2026, at the age of 75.

== Selected bibliography ==
=== Books ===
- Judge, David (1993). The parliamentary state. London Newbury Park, California: Sage Publications. ISBN 9780803988729.
- Judge, David; Stoker, Gerry; Wolman, Harold (1995). Theories of urban politics. London Thousand Oaks, California: Sage Publications. ISBN 9780803988651.
- Judge, David (1999). Representation: theory and practice in Britain. London New York: Routledge. ISBN 9780415081979.
- Judge, David and Earnshaw, David. The European Parliament, Palgrave Macmillan, May 2003. Second edition published 2008. ISBN 9780333598740
- Judge, David (2005). Political institutions in the United Kingdom. Oxford New York: Oxford University Press. ISBN 9780199244263.
- Judge, David (2014) Democratic Incongruities: Representative Democracy in Britain:Democratic Incongruities: Palgrave Macmillan. ISBN 9780230314467
- Judge, David; Leston-Bandeira, Cristina (2024) Reimagining Parliament. Bristol, Bristol University Press. ISBN 9781529226997

=== Articles ===
- Judge, David; Earnshaw, David (2002). "The European Parliament and the Commission crisis: a new assertiveness?". Governance. 15 (3): 345–374. doi:10.1111/0952-1895.00192.
- Judge, David; Earnshaw, David (2002). "No simple dichotomies: lobbyists and the European Parliament" (PDF). Journal of Legislative Studies. 8 (4): 61–79. doi:10.1080/13572330200870005. S2CID 144577535.
- Judge, David (2003). "Legislative institutionalization: a bent analytical arrow". Government and Opposition. 38 (4): 497–516. doi:10.1111/1477-7053.t01-1-00026. S2CID 210816134.
- Judge, David (2004). "Whatever happened to parliamentary democracy in the UK?". Parliamentary Affairs. 57 (3): 682–701. doi:10.1093/pa/gsh052.
- Judge, David (2006). ""This is what democracy looks like": New Labour's blind spot and peripheral vision" (PDF). British Politics. 1 (3): 367–396. doi:10.1057/palgrave.bp.4200028. S2CID 154858727.
- Judge, David; Earnshaw, David (2011). "Relais actors and co-decision agreements in the European Parliament" (PDF). Journal of European Public Policy. 18 (1): 53–71. doi:10.1080/13501763.2011.520877. S2CID 153541324.
- Judge, David (2013). "Word from the street: when nonelectoral representative claims meet electoral democracy in Britain" (PDF). British Politics. 8 (4): 388–409. doi:10.1057/bp.2013.8. S2CID 153658506.
- Judge, David (2013). "Recall of MPs in the UK" (PDF). Parliamentary Affairs. 66 (4): 732–751. doi:10.1093/pa/gss013.
- Judge, David; Flinders, Matthew (2017). "Fifty years of representative and responsible government" (PDF). Representation. 53 (2): 97–116. doi:10.1080/00344893.2017.1341078. S2CID 115132085.
- Judge, David; Leston-Bandeira, Cristina (2018). "The institutional representation of parliament". Political Studies. 66 (1): 154–172. doi:10.1177/0032321717706901. Archived from the original on 9 September 2022.
