= Policy transfer =

Diffusion of policies between political systems

Policy transfer is a process in which information relating to the operation of one political system is utilised by another political system. Policies in one jurisdiction, polity or context therein inform and shape similar policies in other such scopes, such as by adapting policies, administrative structures, institutions, or foundational ideas in one place to inform policy in e.g. another nation, city, or governmental unit. Since problems that are specific to one country are rare, policy-makers in cities, regional governments, and states can often learn from how counterparts elsewhere have responded. Policy transfer is closely related to policy learning but moves beyond learning to action. Policy transfer is also related to the concept of 'policy diffusion'.

While policies have always moved between political systems policy transfer has emerged as a study in and of itself since the mid 1990s with the publication of Who Learns What From Whom: A Review of the Policy Transfer Literature. Since then the concept has been developed and applied by urban geographers under the label of mobilities by Jamie Peck and Nikolas Theodore as Fast Policy and those interested in global networks as policy translations. Out of these literatures policy transfer has been applied to a range of policies running from zero tolerance policing, welfare-to-work and even Business Improvement Districts and the emergence of bike sharing programs.

== Academic research on policy transfer ==
Policy transfer has been the subject of considerable academic research, led primarily by political scientists since the late 1990s. Since the mid-2000s geographers have also played an important role in these debates (often use the term policy mobilities instead of policy transfer).

Since David Dolowitz and David Marsh's (2000) paper 'Learning from abroad: the role of policy transfer in contemporary policy-making', academic research has focused on the issues of who is involved in policy transfer, what is transferred, from and to where policy is transferred, the degrees of and constraints on transfer, and its success once transferred. More recently there have been attempts to explicate the role of two way communication, and particularly feedback from policy stakeholders for successful policy transfer, along with efforts to acknowledge the "indigenization" of policies as they are modified and adapted to context. The debates in geography have focused on the technologies and methods through which policies and ideas circulate – such as study tours, conferences and best practice guides – as well as looking at how and why the policies change form as they circulate.
