= Japan lobby in the United States =

Group of advocacy organizations influencing American policy towards Japan

The Japan lobby are a group of advocacy organizations influencing American policy towards Japan. The lobby has persisted since the Allied Occupation of Japan following the Pacific War. The Post-occupation lobby has been organized and headed since the occupation by Ministry of International Trade and Industry and the Foreign Ministry. The purpose and political influence of the lobby has shifted over time from journalists and American interest groups advocating for land reform and corporate restructuring in the occupation period to multinational groups employing over 1,000 lobbyists.

== History ==
=== Origins ===
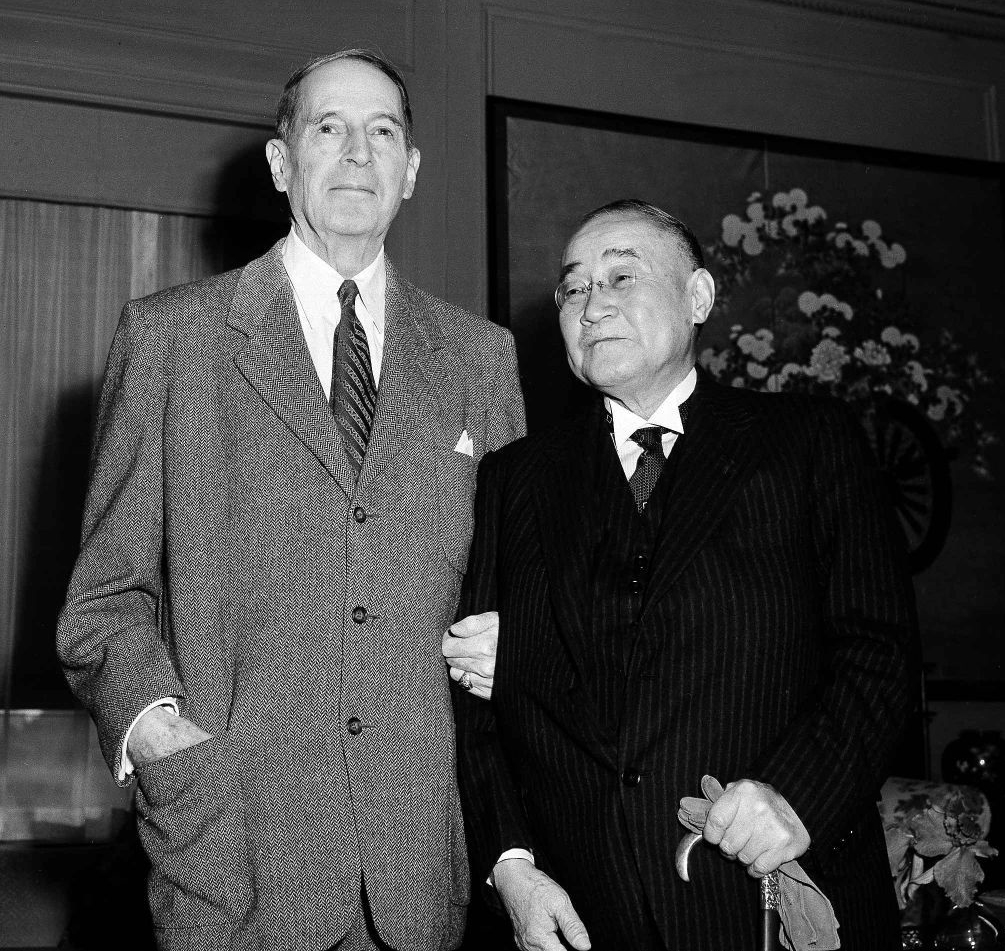
Prime Minister Shigeru Yoshida visits MacArthur (1954)

The formation of the Japan lobby dates back to the purge of officials involved in Japanese expansionism during Shōwa statism. Many business monopolies known as Zaibatsu were dissolved during this reform period, their assets being seized by the occupation authorities. A group of journalists and policymakers, subordinated to the Supreme Commander for the Allied Powers, advocated for a policy shift known as Reverse Course. The Dodge Plan composed the economic portion of this restructuring, reorganizing the familial Zaibatsu into the shareholder based keiretsu. The most prominent group formed from this advocacy was the American Council on Japan (ACJ). The ACJ was led by Harry Francis Kern, a journalist for the magazine Newsweek. Whereas Kern advocated for a reorientation of Japanese policy towards a more conciliatory pro status-quo position, SCAP head Douglas MacArthur disagreed, and thus was the target of much of Kern's attacks. Kern had the backing of former president Herbert Hoover, John Foster Dulles and several American financiers. The Japanese lobby was headed in the State Department by Joseph Grew, US ambassador to Japan between 1932 and 1941. Grew had substantial ties with the Zaibatsu families and the militarist administration, cultivated during his time as ambassador. Other members of the lobby included Eugene Dooman, who would later become embroiled in a CIA scheme involving the smuggling of tungsten. In addition to American support, much of the Japanese political elite were indebted to the ACJ for their success, most notably including future Prime Minister Nobusuke Kishi, who was allegedly released from Sugamo Prison due to ACJ lobbying. Shigeru Yoshida also maintained a relationship with the ACJ, often going on associate meetings with Kern and other members of the organization.

The ACJ during this time period lobbied for 3 major policies. First, the council supported the rollback of the White purge, which had imprisoned or unemployed an estimated 200,000 persons at its height in 1948. Secondly, it was strongly against organized labor and the Japan Socialist Party, supporting the Red Purge succeeding the Reverse Course and thirdly, it supported greater Japanese-American security ties and rearmament, possibly involving the revision of Article 9 of the Japanese Constitution.

During the reform period, Kern and the ACJ launched a sustained pressure campaign against the business purge and Zaibatsu dissolution program. When MacArthur announced the purging of 30,000 Japanese businessmen, Kern wrote in Newsweek that "the most active cultured, and cosmopolitan group in Japan and most predisposed to collaborate with the Americans on internal and external communism had been unjustly purged from their employment." Kern charged that the US had inadvertently undermined "American capitalist principles" by enacting the purge. Newsweek's pressure campaign continued through 1947, blaming the purge for the high level of Japanese inflation and the rise of the Japanese labor movement. Kern then formed an alliance with James Lee Kaufmann, prompting Kaufmann to write that the reformist program, in regards to the purge, was "socialistic" and would lead to an economic collapse in Japan. MacArthur described the activities of Kern and Kaufmann as a campaign to discredit and smear him and the policies of the SCAP. MacArthur sent a cable to the State Department counter-arguing that the Zaibatsu constituted "socialism in private hands".

The Japan lobby was largely successful at both shifting US occupation policy towards an anti-leftist focus and reconstructing the Zaibatsu into shareholder institutions. The Korean War and the loss of China scare fueled a wave of anti-communist policies which led to the outlawing of the Central Committee of the Japanese Communist Party and its media organ Akahata, as well as purges of the civil service and labor unions. The compounding wave of leftist regime change and instability in East Asia convinced Defense Secretary James Forrestal to advocate for a Reverse Course in the same policy line of the ACJ. The proposed policies of the ACJ were also enacted into Japanese law via the 1960 revision to the Security Treaty draft by Kishi and implemented under his brother, Eisaku Satō.
