= Eugene Dooman =

American diplomat (1890–1969)

Eugene Hoffman Dooman (March 25, 1890 – February 2, 1969) was an American diplomat who served as counselor at the United States Embassy in Tokyo during the critical negotiations between the two countries before World War II.

== Background ==
Born in Osaka to Grace and Isaac Dooman, the latter of whom was an Anglican missionary, Dooman knew Japanese as a native language. His parents were from Urmia, Iran, where the predominant Christians were ethnic Assyrians, and came to Japan following the completion of Isaac's training at the General Theological Union in New York in 1888 because Isaac found himself unable to return to his native Persia. Dooman came to the United States in 1903 and attended Trinity School in New York. He attended Columbia School of Mines and graduated from Trinity College in 1911.

== Career ==
Dooman joined the State Department in 1912 as a Student Interpreter after a competitive examination and spent more than thirty years in US government service. He survived the Honda Point disaster.

Dooman spent much of his diplomatic career in Japan with a two-year stint in London (1931–33) and five years in Washington (1933–37). He left Japan in 1941. Earlier that year (February 14) as US embassy counselor, he delivered Franklin D. Roosevelt’s ultimatum to the Japanese Foreign Ministry in Tokyo, which warned that, if Japan attacked Singapore, it would mean war with the United States. By the time of the crucial negotiations with Japan in the late 1930s, Dooman was Counselor of the Embassy, the number two to Ambassador Joseph C. Grew. He frequently served as charge d'affaires ad interim during Grew's absences, including Grew's home leave in 1939. Dooman was interned on the embassy compound after Pearl Harbor, and returned to the US on the Swedish exchange vessel Gripsholm. Later, in 1945, Dooman was involved with his old chief, now Acting Secretary of State Joseph Grew as Special Assistant to Assistant Secretary of State James Dunn in the decision over calling for Japanese surrender. Dooman was one of the drafters of the Potsdam Proclamation, a warning to Japan in 1945 prior to the dropping of atomic bombs. Dooman was opposed to the use of atomic weapons against Japan and a strong advocate for retaining the Emperor. Dooman was strongly anti-communist in his retirement years after the war, and participated in the Senator William Jenner "witchhunt" of 1957 focusing wild accusations on the alleged communist sympathies of Canadian diplomat and scholar Herbert Norman and the distinguished American diplomat (later himself Minister-Counselor in the Tokyo embassy) John Emmerson.

== Later life ==
In 1960, the Government of Japan awarded him the Order of the Rising Sun, Second Class, in recognition of his "long and meritorious service in the advancement of Japanese-American relations and in the building of a new Japan."

Interviewed in 1962 as part of Columbia University’s oral history project, his reminiscences about the Occupation of Japan have provided useful material for historians. The "Eugene Dooman archives" are held at the Hoover Institution at Stanford University.

Dooman died on February 2, 1969, in Litchfield, Connecticut.
