= Iron triangle (US politics) =

Aspect of politics

Diagram of the dynamics of the Iron Triangle of United States politics

In United States politics, the "iron triangle" comprises the policy-making relationship between Congressional committees, the Federal bureaucracy, and special interest groups, in particular, the military–industrial complex. This use of the term derives from the book The Iron Triangle: The Politics of Defense Contracting by national security policy analyst Gordon Adams, published in 1981.

== Central assumption ==
Central to the concept of an iron triangle is the assumption that bureaucratic agencies, as political entities, seek to create and consolidate their own power base.

In this view, the power of an agency (such as State-owned enterprises of the United States, Independent agencies of the United States government or Regulatory agency) is determined by its constituency, not by its consumers. (For these purposes, "constituents" are politically active members sharing a common interest or goal; consumers are the expected recipients of goods or services provided by a governmental bureaucracy and often are identified in an agency's written goals or mission statement.)

Apparent bureaucratic dysfunction may be attributable to the alliances formed between the agency and its constituency. The official goals of an agency may appear to be thwarted or ignored altogether, at the expense of the citizenry it is designed to serve.

== Cultivation of constituency ==
The necessity for a bureaucratic institution to establish a strong support base often results in the institution fostering ties with a specific group within its policy jurisdiction. This is accomplished by identifying potential allies that could significantly enhance its power in the political sphere, utilizing their civic intelligence to leverage collective social capital.

Notably, within the more junior tiers of the bureaucracy, the intended recipients of an agency's services may not possess significant influence, resulting in their perception as ineffective supporters. Large portions of the general public, whose interests are widespread, may lack political engagement, demonstrate inconsistent voting behaviors, suffer from disorganization or inertia, and frequently lack financial strength or resources.

In contrast, private entities or advocacy groups, including 501(c) and 527 organizations, often wield substantial power. These groups typically have robust organization, considerable resources, high mobilization capacity, and are highly active in political endeavors, evidenced by their voting patterns, campaign contributions, lobbying activities, and even initiating legislation.

Therefore, an agency might find it advantageous to shift its attention away from its designated service recipients towards a strategically chosen group of supporters. This enables the agency to pursue its objective of increasing its political clout.

== Dynamics ==
In the United States, power is exercised in the Congress, and, particularly, in congressional committees and subcommittees. By aligning itself with selected constituencies, an agency may be able to affect policy outcomes directly in these committees and subcommittees. This is where an iron triangle may manifest itself.

The image above displays the concept.

- At one corner of the triangle are interest groups (constituencies) and non-state actors. These are the powerful interest groups that influence Congressional votes in their favor and can sufficiently influence the re-election of a member of Congress in return for support of their programs.
- At another corner sit members of Congress who also seek to align themselves with a constituency for political and electoral support. These congressional members support legislation that advances an interest group's agenda.
- Occupying the third corner of the triangle are bureaucrats, who often are pressured by the same powerful interest groups their agency is designated to regulate, and in some cases have close ties to the regulated industry.

The result is a three-way, stable alliance that sometimes is called a "sub-government" because of its durability, impregnability, and power to determine policy.

An iron triangle relationship can result in regulatory capture, the passing of very narrow, pork-barrel policies that benefit a small segment of the population. The interests of the agency's constituency (the interest groups) are met, while the needs of consumers (which may be the general public) are passed over.

That public administration may result in benefiting a small segment of the public in this way, may be viewed as problematic for the popular concept of democracy if the general welfare of all citizens is sacrificed for very specific interests. This is especially so if the passed legislation neglects or reverses the original purpose for which the agency was established. The Regulatory Capture Prevention Act of 2011 - Establishes the Office of Regulatory Integrity in the Office of Management and Budget (OMB), requires investigation when it involves:

1. Agency action or inaction that fails to advance the mission of the agency or is otherwise inimical to the public interest
2. Regulation, licensing, adjudication, grants, or other agency action that favors a limited number of economic interests or is otherwise inimical to the public interest
3. Enforcement priorities that are not reasonably calculated to accomplish regulatory goals; and
4. A loss of confidence in the integrity of the regulatory process.

Some maintain to the contrary, that such arrangements are natural outgrowths of, and not discordant with, the democratic process, since they frequently involve a majority block of voters implementing their will—through their elected representatives in government.

On January 27, 2011, FBI Director Robert Mueller used "iron triangles" to refer to "organized criminals, corrupt government officials, and business leaders" which he said "pose a significant national security threat".

== See also ==
- Iron law of oligarchy
- Issue Network
- Policy
- Polity
- Policy analysis
- Public choice theory
- Regulatory capture
- Revolving door (politics)
- Military–industrial–congressional complex
- Project management triangle also called Iron Triangle
- Advocacy group
- Administrative Procedure Act (United States)

== Bibliography ==
- Gordon Adams. The Iron Triangle: The Politics of Defense Contracting, Council on Economic Priorities, New York, 1981. ISBN 0-87871-012-4
- Graham T. Allison, Philip Zelikow; Essence of Decision: Explaining the Cuban Missile Crisis, Pearson Longman; ISBN 0-321-01349-2 (2nd edition, 1999)
- Dan Briody. The Iron Triangle: Inside the Secret World of the Carlyle Group, Wiley, New York, Chichester, 2004,. ISBN 0-471-66062-0
- Peter Gemma, Op/Ed: "Iron Triangle" Rules Washington, USA Today, December 1988, Retrieved May 23, 2016
- Hugh Heclo; Issue Networks and the Executive Establishment
- Jack H. Knott, Gary J. Miller; Reforming Bureaucracy; Prentice-Hall; ISBN 0-13-770090-3 (1st edition, 1987)
- Francis E. Rourke; Bureaucracy, Politics, and Public Policy Harpercollins; ISBN 0-673-39475-1 (3rd edition, 1984)
- Hedrick Smith; The Power Game: How Washington Really Works
- Ralph Pulitzer, Charles H. Grasty
